= National Register of Historic Places listings in Mobile, Alabama =

Mobile and its surrounding area

This is a list of the National Register of Historic Places listings in Mobile, Alabama.

This is intended to be a complete list of the properties and districts on the National Register of Historic Places in Mobile, Alabama, United States. Latitude and longitude coordinates are provided for many National Register properties and districts; these locations may be seen together in an online map.

There are 138 properties and districts listed on the National Register in Mobile County, including four National Historic Landmarks. 114 of these sites, including all of the National Historic Landmarks, are located within the city limits of Mobile, and are listed here; the remaining 24 sites are listed separately.

This National Park Service list is complete through NPS recent listings posted October 16, 2026.

== History ==
Map of historic districts in Mobile

Located at the junction of the Mobile River and Mobile Bay on the northern Gulf of Mexico, Mobile began as the first capital of colonial French Louisiana in 1702 and remained a part of New France for over 60 years. The city was ceded to Great Britain in 1763, and under British rule the colony continued as part of West Florida. Spain captured Mobile during the American Revolutionary War in 1780, with the Battle of Fort Charlotte.

The city first became a part of the United States in 1813, following the U.S. seizure of Spanish West Florida during the War of 1812. The city and surrounding territory was first added to the Mississippi Territory. It was included in the Alabama Territory in 1817, after Mississippi gained statehood. A fire in October 1827 destroyed most of the old colonial buildings in the city, but from the 1830s onward Mobile expanded with a primary focus on the cotton trade. The city experienced another major fire in 1839 that burned a large central portion of the city and destroyed many of its finest new buildings. On May 25, 1865, an ammunition depot explosion, termed the great Mobile magazine explosion, killed some 300 people and destroyed the northern portion of the city.

Mobile's population had increased from around 40,000 people in 1900 to 60,000 by 1920. Between 1940 and 1943, over 89,000 people moved into Mobile to work for war effort industries. By 1956 the city limits had tripled to accommodate growth. The city lost many of its historic buildings during urban renewal in the 1960s and 1970s. This led to the establishment of the Mobile Historic Development Commission, charged with protecting and enhancing the city's historic resources. Beginning in the late 1980s, the city began an effort termed the "String of Pearls Initiative" to make Mobile into a competitive, urban city. This effort would see numerous projects around the city, including the restoration of hundreds of historic buildings and homes.

== Architecture ==
Mobile has antebellum architectural examples of the Federal, Greek Revival, Gothic Revival, and Italianate styles. Additionally, the Creole cottage and Gulf Coast cottage are building types that are indigenous to the area, and are among the earliest surviving house types. Mobile's downtown townhouses, primarily built between the 1840s and 1860s, typically combine Late Federal style architecture with Greek Revival or Italianate elements and cast iron galleries.

Mobile has antebellum architectural examples of Greek Revival, Gothic Revival, Italianate, and Creole cottage. Later architectural styles found in the city include the various Victorian types, shotgun types, Colonial Revival, Tudor Revival, Spanish Colonial Revival, Beaux-Arts and many others. The city currently has nine major historic districts: Old Dauphin Way, Oakleigh Garden, Lower Dauphin Street, Leinkauf, De Tonti Square, Church Street East, Ashland Place, Campground, and Midtown.

Mobile has a number of historic structures in the city, including numerous churches and private homes. Mobile's historic churches include Christ Church Cathedral, the Cathedral Basilica of the Immaculate Conception, Emanuel AME Church, Government Street Presbyterian Church, St. Louis Street Missionary Baptist Church, State Street AME Zion Church, Stone Street Baptist Church, Trinity Episcopal Church, St. Francis Street Methodist Church, Saint Joseph's Roman Catholic Church, Saint Francis Xavier Catholic Church, Saint Matthew's Catholic Church, Saint Paul's Episcopal Chapel, and Saint Vincent de Paul. The Sodality Chapel and St. Joseph's Chapel at Spring Hill College are two historic churches on that campus. Two historic Roman Catholic convents survive, the Convent and Academy of the Visitation and the Convent of Mercy.

Barton Academy is a historic Greek Revival school building and local landmark on Government Street. The Bishop Portier House and the Carlen House are two of the many surviving examples of Creole cottages in the city. The Mobile City Hospital and the United States Marine Hospital are both restored Greek Revival hospital buildings that predate the Civil War. The Washington Firehouse No. 5 is a Greek Revival fire station, built in 1851. The Hunter House is an example of the Italianate style and was built by a successful 19th-century African American businesswoman. The Shepard House is a good example of the Queen Anne style. The Scottish Rite Temple is the only surviving example of Egyptian Revival architecture in the city. The Gulf, Mobile and Ohio Passenger Terminal is an example of the Mission Revival style.

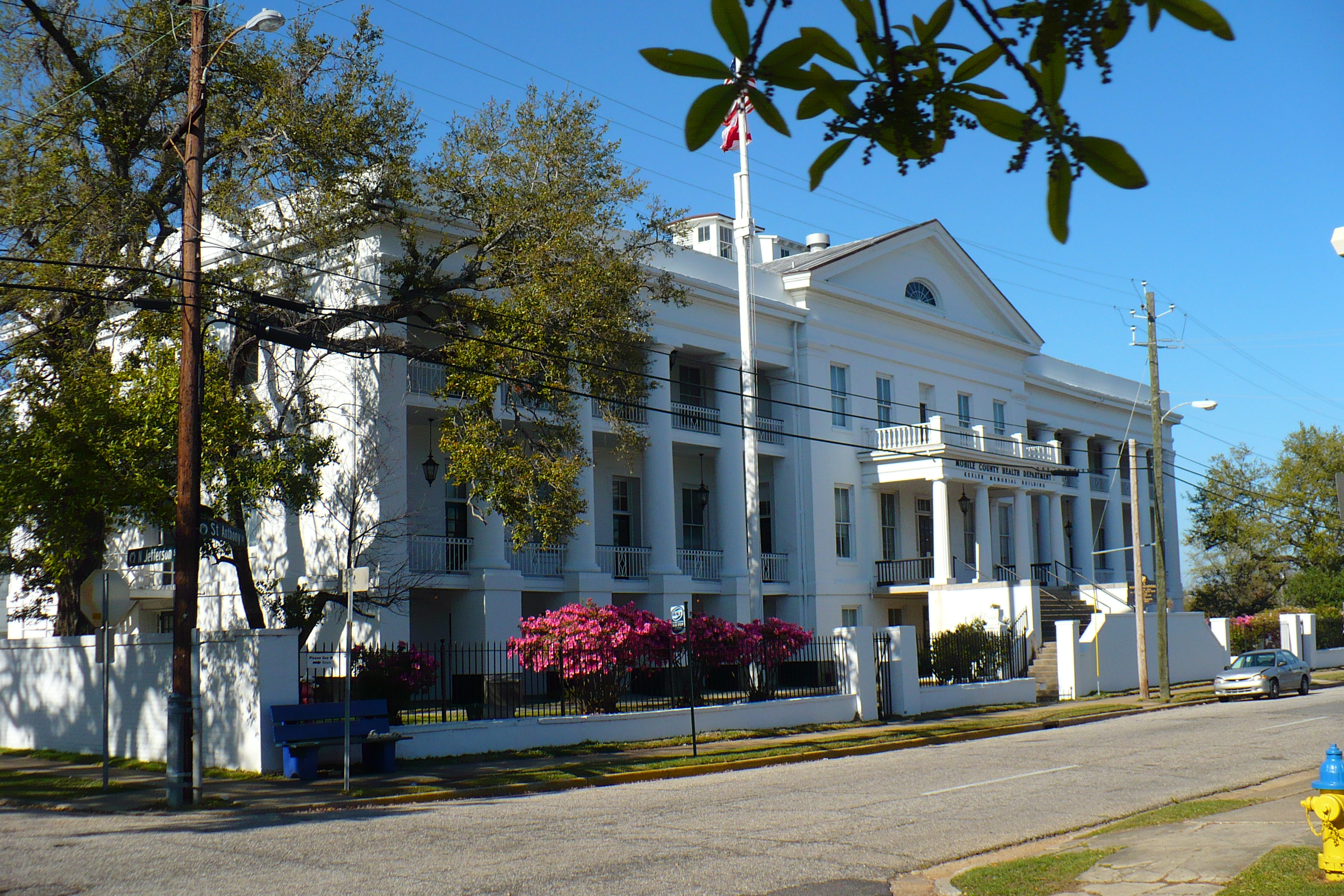
The old United States Marine Hospital, restored and adapted for reuse by the Mobile County Health Department.

The city has several historic cemeteries that were established shortly after the colonial era. They replaced the colonial Campo Santo, of which no trace remains. The Church Street Graveyard contains above-ground tombs and monuments spread over 4 acres (2 ha) and was founded in 1819, during the height of yellow fever epidemics. The nearby 120-acre (49 ha) Magnolia Cemetery was established in 1836 and served as Mobile's primary burial site during the 19th and early 20th centuries, with approximately 80,000 burials. It features tombs and many intricately carved monuments and statues.

The Catholic Cemetery was established in 1848 by the Archdiocese of Mobile and covers more than 150 acres (61 ha). It contains plots for the Brothers of the Sacred Heart, Little Sisters of the Poor, Sisters of Charity, and Sisters of Mercy, in addition to many other historically significant burials. Mobile's Jewish community dates back to the 1820s and the city has two historic Jewish cemeteries, Sha'arai Shomayim Cemetery and Ahavas Chesed Cemetery. Sha'arai Shomayim is the older of the two.

== Current listings ==
	Name on the Register	Image	Date listed	Location	Description
1	Africatown Historic District	Africatown Historic District	December 4, 2012 (#12000990)	Bounded by Jakes Ln., Paper Mill, & Warren Rds., Chin, & Railroad Sts. 30°44′07″N 88°03′31″W	Community established after the Civil War by African Americans who arrived in the United States aboard the slave ship Clotilda in 1860. It is on the African American Heritage Trail of Mobile.
2	Aimwell Baptist Church	Aimwell Baptist Church	May 29, 2008 (#08000458)	500 Earle St. 30°41′58″N 88°03′10″W	The congregation of this historically African American Baptist church was established in 1890. The current church building dates to 1946.
3	Ashland Place Historic District	Ashland Place Historic District	June 23, 1987 (#87000935)	Roughly bounded by Springhill and Ryan Aves., Old Shell Rd., and Levert Ave. 30°41′26″N 88°05′40″W	This historic district is an early 20th-century neighborhood consisting of over 90 homes. Architectural styles range from late Victorian to the Craftsman and Tudor Revival.
4	Wade Askew House	Wade Askew House	July 12, 1991 (#91000858)	103 Florence Pl. 30°41′17″N 88°05′22″W	This bungalow in Midtown was built in 1927. It is one of the many Spanish Colonial Revival style houses in the Florence Place subdivision, established on what was the outskirts of Mobile in the 1920s. The subdivision was planned to have Spanish Revival houses only, reflecting the popularity of the style in the city during the early 20th century.
5	Automobile Alley Historic District	Automobile Alley Historic District	June 22, 2016 (#16000400)	156-157 N. Cedar, 108 N. Dearborn, 100-101 N. Franklin, 156 N. Hamilton, 163 N. Lawrence, 453-701 St. Anthony Sts.; also 752-54, 756, 762 St. Louis St. 30°41′34″N 88°03′01″W	Second set of addresses represent a boundary increase approved June 27, 2023.
6	Azalea Court Apartments	Azalea Court Apartments	February 11, 1988 (#88000108)	1820 Old Government St. 30°40′41″N 88°04′59″W	This three-story Spanish Colonial Revival style apartment building in Midtown was built in 1928.
7	Barton Academy	Barton Academy	February 16, 1970 (#70000107)	504 Government St. 30°41′18″N 88°02′52″W	This Greek Revival school building, designed by architects James Gallier, James H. Dakin and Charles B. Dakin, was completed in 1836. It was the first public school in the state of Alabama.
8	Battle House Royale	Battle House Royale	August 19, 1975 (#75000322)	26 N. Royal St. 30°41′35″N 88°02′27″W	This downtown hotel was established in 1852. Guests have included Stephen A. Douglas, Henry Clay, Jefferson Davis, Millard Fillmore, Winfield Scott, and Woodrow Wilson. The first building burned in 1905. The current structure was completed in 1908 and is one of the earliest steel frame structures remaining in Alabama.
9	Beal-Gaillard House	Beal-Gaillard House	October 18, 1984 (#84000078)	111 Myrtlewood Ln. 30°41′57″N 88°07′59″W	This Creole cottage style house was built in 1836 in what was then the village of Spring Hill. Spring Hill was primarily settled by Mobilians attempting to escape the heat and disease that plagued the city during the warm summer months.
10	Blue Bird Hardware and Seed	Blue Bird Hardware and Seed	August 13, 2018 (#100002768)	2724 Old Shell Rd. 30°41′38″N 88°06′22″W	
11	Bragg-Mitchell House	Bragg-Mitchell House	September 27, 1972 (#72000168)	1906 Springhill Ave. 30°41′33″N 88°05′10″W	This two-story mansion was built by John Bragg in 1855. It uses Greek Revival and Italianate stylistic elements in a combination referred to as "bracketed Greek Revival".
12	Brisk & Jacobson Store	Brisk & Jacobson Store	March 14, 1973 (#73000361)	2 Dauphin St. 30°41′32″N 88°02′23″W	This Italianate-style commercial building was completed in 1866 by local merchants Isaac Goldsmith and William Frohlichstein. The four-story structure features an early cast iron facade by Daniel D. Badger's Architectural Iron Works.
13	Caldwell School	Caldwell School	December 20, 2011 (#11000898)	351 N. Broad St. 30°41′35″N 88°03′27″W	The school was built in 1947 to replace the first high school for African Americans in Mobile. It opened as an elementary school, and is today used by Bishop State Community College.
14	The Campground	The Campground	July 7, 2005 (#05000648)	Martin Luther King Jr. Ave., Rylands St., St. Stephens Rd., and Ann St. 30°41′46″N 88°03′59″W	This historic district encompasses a historically African American neighborhood consisting of over 166 contributing buildings. The houses date from the late 19th century to the middle 20th century. It is on the African American Heritage Trail of Mobile.
15	Carlen House	Carlen House	June 12, 1981 (#81000131)	54 S. Carlen St. 30°41′03″N 88°05′10″W	This Gulf Coast cottage style house in Midtown was built in 1843 by Irish immigrants to Mobile, Michael and Mary Carlen.
16	Carolina Hall	Carolina Hall	January 18, 1973 (#73000362)	70 S. McGregor St. 30°41′29″N 88°08′37″W	This mansion in the Spring Hill neighborhood began as a Federal style house in 1832. It was later expanded and remodeled in the Greek Revival style.
17	Cavallero House	Cavallero House	October 7, 1982 (#82001610)	7 N. Jackson St. 30°41′27″N 88°02′42″W	This two-and-a-half-story brick townhouse was built in 1835. Cast iron galleries were added to the front in the mid-19th century.
18	Center-Gaillard House	Center-Gaillard House	October 18, 1984 (#84000081)	3500 The Cedars; 30°42′05″N 88°08′06″W	This two-story house in the Spring Hill neighborhood began as a retreat in 1827 and was expanded several times in the 19th century.
19	Church Street East Historic District	Church Street East Historic District	December 16, 1971 (#71000102)	Roughly bounded by Conti, Water, Claiborne, Eslava, Warren, and Bayou Sts.; also roughly bounded by Broad, Conti, Water, Claiborne, and Canal Sts.; also 66 and 68 S. Royal St. 30°41′16″N 88°02′44″W	This downtown historic district features government, museum, commercial, and residential structures in a variety of 19th century styles. It contains 83 contributing buildings and one object. The second and third sets of boundaries represent boundary increases of January 13, 1984 and April 25, 2005 respectively.
20	U. J. Cleveland House	U. J. Cleveland House	May 21, 1993 (#93000420)	551 Charles St. 30°40′35″N 88°03′24″W	This Gulf Coast cottage style house was built in 1853.
21	Coley Building	Coley Building	October 22, 1982 (#82001611)	56 St. Francis St. 30°41′37″N 88°02′25″W	This two-and-a-half-story commercial building was built in 1836. It was demolished to make way for an RSA Battle House Tower parking deck in 2003. The original facade was restored, reconstructed and incorporated into the parking deck.
22	Collins-Marston House	Collins-Marston House	October 18, 1984 (#84000083)	4703 Old Shell Rd. 30°41′35″N 88°09′05″W	This 1 1/2-story wood-frame house in the Spring Hill neighborhood was built in the Gulf Coast cottage style in 1832.
23	Collins-Robinson House	Collins-Robinson House	October 18, 1984 (#84000087)	56 Oakland Ave. 30°41′42″N 88°09′07″W	This Creole cottage style house in the Spring Hill neighborhood was built in 1843.
24	Common Street District	Common Street District	February 4, 1982 (#82002058)	959-1002 Dauphin St. and 7-19 Common St. 30°41′14″N 88°03′27″W	This historic district, centered on Common Street, has now been absorbed by the Old Dauphin Way Historic District. It remains individually listed on the National Register and contains examples of Greek Revival, Italianate, and Queen Anne style architecture.
25	Convent and Academy of the Visitation	Convent and Academy of the Visitation	April 24, 1992 (#91000844)	2300 Springhill Ave. 30°41′38″N 88°05′38″W	This historic district encompasses the convent for the Order of the Visitation of Holy Mary, now known as the Visitation Monastery. The earliest structures date from 1855 with the latest dating to the 1890s. Architectural styles include the Renaissance Revival and Romanesque Revival styles.
26	Convent of Mercy	Convent of Mercy	April 24, 1992 (#91000845)	753 St. Francis St. 30°41′20″N 88°03′10″W	This 3 1/2-story Baroque Revival style building was completed in 1908. It once served as the convent for the Sisters of Mercy, but has now been converted into condominiums.
27	D'Iberville Apartments	D'Iberville Apartments	September 3, 2004 (#04000925)	2000 Spring Hill Ave. 30°41′37″N 88°05′22″W	This complex of apartment buildings in Midtown was built in the Minimal Traditionalist style in 1943, coinciding with Mobile's rapid growth during World War II.
28	Dahm House	Dahm House	January 5, 1984 (#84000665)	7 N. Claiborne St. 30°41′28″N 88°02′46″W	This two-story brick townhouse was built for John Dahm in 1873.
29	Davis Avenue Branch, Mobile Public Library	Davis Avenue Branch, Mobile Public Library	December 22, 1983 (#83003459)	564 Dr. Martin Luther King Jr. Ave. 30°41′43″N 88°03′04″W	The Davis Avenue Branch of the Mobile Public Library was built in 1931 to serve Mobile's African American community during the era of racial segregation. The building is a smaller version of the main library on Government Street. It now serves as the National African American Archives and Museum. It is on the African American Heritage Trail of Mobile.
30	Davis Avenue Recreation Center	Davis Avenue Recreation Center	June 27, 2011 (#11000407)	1361 Dr. Martin Luther King Jr. Ave. 30°42′00″N 88°03′58″W	Founded in 1921 as the Davis Avenue Community House, this was the first public recreation center for African Americans in Mobile. The current building dates to 1936 and was built using Works Progress Administration funds.
31	De Tonti Square Historic District	De Tonti Square Historic District	February 7, 1972 (#72000169)	Roughly bounded by Adams, St. Anthony, Claiborne, and Conception Sts. 30°41′45″N 88°02′50″W	This historic district is primarily an antebellum neighborhood with over 60 contributing buildings. Many of the houses are two-story brick townhouses built in the Late Federal style with Greek Revival influences.
32	Denby House	Denby House	January 5, 1984 (#84000668)	558 Conti St. 30°41′20″N 88°02′57″W	This one-story brick raised cottage was built by Charles Denby in 1873.
33	Emanuel AME Church	Emanuel AME Church	May 29, 1987 (#87000853)	656 Saint Michael St. 30°41′26″N 88°03′05″W	This historically African American church was established in 1869. James F. Hutchisson, a prominent local architect, remodeled the existing building in a Gothic Revival style in 1881. It is on the African American Heritage Trail of Mobile.
34	Emanuel Building	Emanuel Building	March 21, 1978 (#78000503)	100 N. Royal St. 30°41′38″N 88°02′28″W	This three-story commercial building was built in 1850.
35	George Fearn House	George Fearn House	July 12, 1991 (#91000855)	1806 Airport Blvd. 30°40′42″N 88°04′56″W	This house in Midtown, built in 1904, is the earliest example of the Spanish Colonial Revival style in Mobile. It was designed by George Bigelow Rogers.
36	Fire Station No. 5	Fire Station No. 5	December 22, 1983 (#83003462)	7 N. Lawrence St. 30°41′25″N 88°02′54″W	This unusual Greek Revival style building is the earliest surviving fire station in the city, built in 1851.
37	First National Bank	First National Bank	November 17, 1978 (#78000504)	68 St. Francis St. 30°41′37″N 88°02′27″W	This two-story bank building was built in the Classical Revival style in 1905. The architectural features are rendered in glazed terracotta.
38	Fort Conde-Charlotte	Fort Conde-Charlotte	May 21, 1969 (#69000033)	150 S. Royal St. 30°41′20″N 88°02′24″W	This partial reconstruction of Fort Charlotte, Mobile (French: Fort Condé de la Mobille and Spanish: Fuerte Carlota de Mobila) was completed in 1976. The original 18th century fort foundations were discovered during the construction of the George Wallace Tunnel in the downtown Mobile commercial district. The current fort was reconstructed on the site after the tunnel was completed.
39	Gates-Daves House	Gates-Daves House	June 20, 1974 (#74000427)	1570-1572 Dauphin St. 30°41′15″N 88°04′31″W	This house, built in 1841, is the best example of a Creole plantation house remaining in Mobile.
40	Georgia Cottage	Georgia Cottage	September 14, 1972 (#72000170)	2564 Springhill Ave. 30°41′47″N 88°06′00″W	This Gulf Coast cottage with Greek Revival influences was the early home of author Augusta Jane Evans. It was completed in 1840.
41	Government Street Presbyterian Church	Government Street Presbyterian Church	October 5, 1992 (#92001885)	300 Government St. 30°41′22″N 88°02′40″W	This church, designed by James Gallier, James Dakin, and Charles Dakin, was completed in 1836. Designated a National Historic Landmark, it is one of the oldest and least-altered Greek Revival church buildings remaining in the United States.
42	Greene-Marston House	Greene-Marston House	January 11, 1983 (#83002966)	2000 Dauphin St. 30°41′12″N 88°05′19″W	This house, commonly known as Termite Hall, began as 1 1/2-story cottage in 1851. It is closely associated with Mobile's literary history.
43	Gulf, Mobile and Ohio Passenger Terminal	Gulf, Mobile and Ohio Passenger Terminal	August 15, 1975 (#75000323)	Beauregard and St. Joseph Sts. 30°42′01″N 88°02′44″W	This Mission Revival style train station was completed in 1907. It served as Mobile's terminal on the Mobile and Ohio Railroad, later to become the Gulf, Mobile and Ohio Railroad.
44	Hawthorn House	Hawthorn House	May 21, 1984 (#84000671)	352 Stanton Rd. 30°41′59″N 88°05′18″W	This Gulf Coast cottage was built by Joshua K. Hawthorn in 1853.
45	Martin Horst House	Martin Horst House	June 21, 1971 (#71000103)	407 Conti St. 30°41′22″N 88°02′48″W	This brick Italianate style house, one of the best examples remaining in the city, was completed in 1867.
46	Hunter House	Hunter House	March 7, 1985 (#85000446)	504 St. Francis St. 30°41′27″N 88°02′56″W	This wood-frame Italianate style house was built by Bettie Hunter, a successful African American businesswoman and former slave, in 1878. She died less than a year after completing it. It is on the African American Heritage Trail of Mobile.
47	International Longshoreman's Association Hall	International Longshoreman's Association Hall	June 27, 2011 (#11000408)	505 Dr. Martin Luther King, Jr. Ave. 30°41′39″N 88°02′58″W	The International Longshoreman’s Association (ILA) Hall dates to 1949. The Mobile chapter of the ILA was established in 1936 to represent African Americans working on the city's docks. Dr. Martin Luther King, Jr. spoke here on January 1, 1959.
48	Joseph Jossen House	Joseph Jossen House	May 29, 1992 (#92000628)	109 N. Conception St. 30°41′36″N 88°02′38″W	This brick Queen Anne style house was completed in 1906. It has been converted to commercial use.
49	Kirkbride House	Kirkbride House	December 12, 1973 (#73000363)	104 Theater St. 30°41′18″N 88°02′24″W	The earliest section of this house, situated between the southern bastions of Fort Conde, dates to 1822 and incorporates portions of a former courthouse and jail that were converted into a kitchen wing.
50	Lafayette Heights Historic District		December 10, 2014 (#14001004)	Bounded by Dr. Martin Luther King Jr. & Spring Hill Aves., Rylands & Basil Sts. 30°41′59″N 88°04′08″W	
51	Leinkauf Historic District	Leinkauf Historic District	June 24, 1987 (#87000936)	Roughly bounded by Government, S. Monterey, Eslava, Lamar, and S. Monterey Sts. 30°40′38″N 88°04′22″W	This historic district is a late 19th and early 20th century neighborhood consisting of over 300 buildings. Architectural styles range from Queen Anne to Craftsman.
52	George Levy House	George Levy House	July 12, 1991 (#91000861)	107 Florence Pl. 30°41′18″N 88°05′22″W	This Spanish Colonial Revival style house in the Florence Place subdivision was completed in 1927.
53	Martin Lindsey House	Martin Lindsey House	January 24, 1991 (#90002176)	3112 Bay Front Rd. 30°36′24″N 88°03′34″W	This house, built in 1915, features a local vernacular style. It sits on Mobile Bay, along a remnant of the old Bay Shell Road.
54	Lower Dauphin Street Commercial Historic District	Lower Dauphin Street Commercial Historic District	February 9, 1979 (#79000392)	171-614 Dauphin St.; also Dauphin St. from Water to Dearborn Ave.; also roughly Dauphin St. from Jefferson St. to Dearborn St., and the southern side of St. Francis St. from Bayou St. to Lawrence St.; also 310 St. Francis St.; also Water, Conti, Broad, St. Francis & St. Louis Sts. 30°41′24″N 88°02′47″W	This historic district encompasses much of Mobile's oldest intact business district. Second, third, fourth, and fifth sets of boundaries represent boundary increases of February 19, 1982, June 30, 1995, August 14, 1998, and September 3, 2019, respectively
55	Magnolia Cemetery	Magnolia Cemetery	June 13, 1986 (#86003757)	Ann and Virginia Sts. 30°40′28″N 88°03′45″W	This city cemetery was established in 1836 and served as Mobile's primary burial site during the remainder of the 19th century. It contains more than 80,000 burials and features many elaborate monuments.
56	Maysville Historic District	Maysville Historic District	December 25, 2013 (#13000959)	Bounded by Virginia, Ann, Duval & Houston Sts. 30°39′56″N 88°04′28″W	
57	Meaher-Zoghby House	Meaher-Zoghby House	January 5, 1984 (#84000672)	5 N. Claiborne St. 30°41′27″N 88°02′46″W	This two-story brick townhouse was built in 1901 for Augustine Meaher.
58	Ernest Megginson House	Ernest Megginson House	July 12, 1991 (#91000860)	143 Florence Pl. 30°41′26″N 88°05′22″W	This Spanish Colonial Revival style house in the Florence Place subdivision was completed in 1927.
59	Metzger House	Metzger House	January 5, 1984 (#84000675)	7 N. Hamilton St. 30°41′25″N 88°02′51″W	This one-story Italianate house was completed in 1875.
60	Midtown Historic District	Midtown Historic District	November 29, 2001 (#01001293)	Roughly bounded by Taylor Ave., U.S. Route 90, Houston St., Kenneth St., U.S. Route 98, and Florida St.; also 2401-2403 and 2407 Old Shell Rd. 30°41′00″N 88°04′44″W	This historic district is made up of 20th century neighborhoods and contains 1270 contributing buildings. The second set of addresses represent a boundary increase approved November 18, 2020.
61	Miller-O'Donnell House	Miller-O'Donnell House	February 19, 1982 (#82002060)	1102 Broad St. 30°39′52″N 88°03′25″W	This was the site of a raised Gulf Coast cottage, built in 1837. It has been destroyed.
62	Mobile City Hall	Mobile City Hall	December 3, 1969 (#69000034)	111 S. Royal St. 30°41′23″N 88°02′23″W	This National Historic Landmark was built to serve the combined functions of a market and city administration. It was completed in an Italianate style in 1857.
63	Mobile City Hospital	Mobile City Hospital	February 26, 1970 (#70000108)	900-950 St. Anthony St. 30°41′28″N 88°03′20″W	This three-story brick hospital was completed in 1830. The Greek Revival style building served as the city-run hospital from 1831 until 1966. It served as a Confederate hospital during the American Civil War.
64	Mobile Seamen's Club Building	Mobile Seamen's Club Building	October 16, 2020 (#100004131)	350 St. Joseph St. 30°41′55″N 88°02′42″W	
65	Monterey Place	Monterey Place	January 5, 1984 (#84000680)	1552 Monterey Pl. 30°41′04″N 88°04′26″W	Best known as the Shepard House, this Queen Anne style residence was completed in 1897.
66	James Arthur Morrison House	James Arthur Morrison House	July 12, 1991 (#91000863)	159 Hillwood Rd. 30°41′38″N 88°09′00″W	This Spanish Colonial Revival style house in the Spring Hill neighborhood was completed in 1926.
67	Mt. Olive Missionary Baptist Church No.1	Mt. Olive Missionary Baptist Church No.1	May 29, 2008 (#08000459)	409 Lexington Ave. 30°42′00″N 88°04′08″W	This historically African American Baptist church was built in a vernacular style in 1916.
68	Murphy High School	Murphy High School	November 4, 1982 (#82001612)	100 S. Carlen St. 30°40′55″N 88°05′10″W	This Spanish Colonial Revival style school opened as Mobile High School in 1926.
69	Neville House	Neville House	January 5, 1984 (#84000682)	255 St. Francis St. 30°41′31″N 88°02′41″W	This two-story brick townhouse was completed in 1896.
70	Oakdale Historic District		December 10, 2014 (#14001005)	Bounded by I-10, Preston Ave., Virginia & Ann Sts. 30°39′58″N 88°03′47″W	
71	Oakleigh	Oakleigh	May 27, 1971 (#71000104)	350 Oakleigh St. 30°40′51″N 88°03′37″W	This raised Greek Revival mansion was completed in 1833 by James W. Roper, owner of a local brickyard. The property originally included 35 acres (140,000 m^{2}) of grounds, but the majority of it was converted to city lots in the mid-to-late 19th century.
72	Oakleigh Garden Historic District	Oakleigh Garden Historic District	April 13, 1972 (#72000171)	Roughly bounded by Government, Marine, Texas, and Ann Sts.; also roughly bounded by Selma St., Broad St., Texas St., and Rapier Ave. 30°40′55″N 88°03′43″W	Centered on the Oakleigh Mansion, this historic district contains over 280 contributing buildings. Architectural styles range from Greek Revival and Italianate to Queen Anne. Second set of boundaries represent a boundary increase of January 30, 1991; a boundary decrease was listed December 20, 2016.
73	Old Dauphin Way Historic District	Old Dauphin Way Historic District	August 30, 1984 (#84000686)	Roughly bounded by Springhill Ave. and Broad, Government, and Houston Sts. 30°41′14″N 88°04′07″W	The largest of Mobile's historic districts contains neighborhoods ranging from the mid-19th to early 20th centuries. It contains over 1466 contributing buildings in styles ranging from Greek Revival and Gothic Revival to Queen Anne and Craftsman. A boundary increase was approved June 17, 2022.
74	Paterson House	Paterson House	May 15, 1986 (#86001065)	1673 Government St. 30°40′40″N 88°04′44″W	This Mediterranean Revival style mansion in Midtown was completed in 1927.
75	J. E. Paterson House	J. E. Paterson House	July 12, 1991 (#91000859)	118 Florence Pl. 30°41′21″N 88°05′20″W	This Spanish Colonial Revival style house in the Florence Place subdivision was completed in 1929.
76	Dave Patton House	Dave Patton House	June 12, 1987 (#87000937)	1252 Martin Luther King, Jr. Ave. 30°41′59″N 88°03′48″W	This mansion was built by Dave Patton, a successful African American businessman, in 1915. It is on the African American Heritage Trail of Mobile.
77	Pfau-Crichton Cottage	Pfau-Crichton Cottage	October 18, 1984 (#84000120)	3703 Old Shell Rd. 30°41′55″N 88°07′40″W	This Gulf Coast cottage, best known as Chinaberry, was completed in 1862. Situated at the base of Spring Hill, it was once the home of Anne Randolph Crichton. She was the last direct descendant of Hugh Randolph Crichton, founder of the Mobile County town of Crichton.
78	Phillipi House	Phillipi House	January 5, 1984 (#84000689)	53 N. Jackson St. 30°41′32″N 88°02′44″W	This two-story brick townhouse was built in 1850. The architecture features a simple Federal style with a Greek Revival door surround. A cast iron gallery was added after the initial construction.
79	Pincus Building	Pincus Building	December 12, 1976 (#76000345)	1 S. Royal St. 30°41′32″N 88°02′27″W	This four-story brick commercial building was completed in 1891 in the Queen Anne style.
80	Bishop Portier House	Bishop Portier House	February 26, 1970 (#70000109)	307 Conti St. 30°41′24″N 88°02′42″W	This Creole cottage was completed in 1833. It served as the residence of Michael Portier, Mobile's first Roman Catholic bishop.
81	Protestant Children's Home	Protestant Children's Home	June 18, 1973 (#73000364)	911 Dauphin St. 30°41′14″N 88°03′20″W	This Late Federal style building was completed in 1845. It served as a Protestant orphanage.
82	Roberts House	Roberts House	July 29, 1994 (#94000789)	3 Wimbledon Dr. 30°41′10″N 88°09′02″W	This Tudor Revival mansion was completed in 1929.
83	Ross Knox House	Ross Knox House	December 30, 2008 (#08001252)	102 Hillwood Rd. 30°41′17″N 88°09′00″W	This Tudor Revival house was completed in 1929.
84	St. Francis Street Methodist Church	St. Francis Street Methodist Church	January 5, 1984 (#84000690)	15 N. Joachim St. 30°41′31″N 88°02′40″W	This Methodist church building was completed in 1896.
85	Saint Francis Xavier Roman Catholic Church	Saint Francis Xavier Roman Catholic Church	July 3, 1991 (#91000842)	2034 St. Stephens Rd. 30°42′34″N 88°04′49″W	This Roman Catholic church building in the Toulminville neighborhood was built in 1916, after the previous building was destroyed in a hurricane.
86	Saint Joseph's Roman Catholic Church	Saint Joseph's Roman Catholic Church	July 3, 1991 (#91000841)	808 Springhill Ave. 30°41′23″N 88°03′14″W	This Gothic Revival church building was completed in 1909. It serves as the parish church for St. Joseph's Parish, established in 1857.
87	St. Louis Street Missionary Baptist Church	St. Louis Street Missionary Baptist Church	October 8, 1976 (#76000347)	108 N. Dearborn St. 30°41′29″N 88°03′04″W	This Missionary Baptist church began with a rift in Mobile's African Baptist Church, later to become the Stone Street Baptist Church. The new congregation that split from the original formed this church. They purchased this property in 1859 and constructed a church. This Classical Revival building was built in 1872. In 1874 they hosted the seventh Colored Baptist Convention of Alabama here, which led to the formation of Selma University. It is on the African American Heritage Trail of Mobile.
88	Saint Matthew's Catholic Church	Saint Matthew's Catholic Church	July 3, 1991 (#91000840)	1200 S. Marine St. 30°39′46″N 88°03′28″W	This Roman Catholic parish church was built in the Mediterranean Revival style in 1913, shortly after the formation of its parish.
89	Saint Paul's Episcopal Chapel	Saint Paul's Episcopal Chapel	October 18, 1984 (#84000123)	4051 Old Shell Rd. 30°41′53″N 88°08′21″W	This wood-frame Episcopal chapel in the Spring Hill neighborhood was completed in 1859. It is an example of Carpenter Gothic architecture.
90	Saint Vincent de Paul	Saint Vincent de Paul	April 24, 1992 (#91000839)	351 S. Lawrence St. 30°40′57″N 88°02′42″W	This Roman Catholic church, now known as Prince of Peace Church, began with an earlier frame structure, completed in 1847, that served as parish church for Saint Vincent de Paul Parish. This brick Gothic Revival building was built in 1872. Saint Vincent de Paul Parish was enlarged and renamed Prince of Peace Parish in 1970.
91	Scottish Rite Temple	Scottish Rite Temple	January 5, 1984 (#84000694)	351 St. Francis St. 30°41′29″N 88°02′47″W	This Egyptian Revival building was completed in 1921 for the Scottish Rite of Freemasonry. It was designed by George B. Rogers.
92	Raphael Semmes House	Raphael Semmes House	February 26, 1970 (#70000110)	804 Government St. 30°41′12″N 88°03′08″W	This two-story brick townhouse was completed in 1858. It is famous as the post-war home of Admiral Raphael Semmes, captain of the Confederate sloop-of-war CSS Alabama.
93	Sodality Chapel	Sodality Chapel	October 18, 1984 (#84000122)	4307 Old Shell Rd. 30°41′32″N 88°08′07″W	This small Roman Catholic chapel building on the campus of Spring Hill College was completed in 1850.
94	South Lafayette Street Creole Cottages	South Lafayette Street Creole Cottages	November 7, 1976 (#76000346)	20, 22, and 23 S. Lafayette St. 30°41′08″N 88°04′17″W	These three Creole cottages on South Lafayette Street were all completed in 1852.
95	Robert L. Spotswood House	Robert L. Spotswood House	July 12, 1991 (#91000854)	1 Country Club Rd. 30°41′33″N 88°09′00″W	The Spanish Colonial Revival house in the Spring Hill neighborhood was completed in 1926.
96	Spring Hill College Quadrangle	Spring Hill College Quadrangle	August 17, 1973 (#73000365)	4307 Old Shell Rd. 30°41′36″N 88°08′13″W	This grouping of structures on the campus of Spring Hill College includes the Renaissance Revival style Administration Building, completed in 1869, and the Gothic Revival style St. Joseph's Chapel, completed in 1910.
97	State Street AME Zion Church	State Street AME Zion Church	September 6, 1978 (#78000505)	502 State St. 30°41′38″N 88°03′01″W	This is Mobile's oldest African American congregation, established in 1829 as the African Church of the City of Mobile. The current Romanesque Revival building was completed in 1854; it is the oldest remaining Methodist church building in Alabama. It is on the African American Heritage Trail of Mobile.
98	Amelia Stewart House	Amelia Stewart House	May 29, 1992 (#92000629)	50 Common St. 30°41′10″N 88°03′28″W	This Greek Revival cottage in Midtown was completed in 1835. Moved from 137 Tuscaloosa St. in 2018.
99	Stewartfield	Stewartfield	October 18, 1984 (#84000124)	4307 Old Shell Rd. 30°41′39″N 88°08′32″W	This raised Greek Revival mansion in the Spring Hill neighborhood was completed in 1849.
100	Stone Street Baptist Church	Stone Street Baptist Church	August 8, 1985 (#85001749)	311 Tunstall St. 30°41′46″N 88°03′06″W	This African American congregation, the second oldest in Mobile, was established by 1836. They moved to their present location in 1870. The current building dates to 1909. It is on the African American Heritage Trail of Mobile.
101	Stone Street Cemetery	Stone Street Cemetery	July 3, 1991 (#91000843)	1700 Martin Luther King, Jr., Boulevard; 30°42′35″N 88°04′27″W	Now known as Catholic Cemetery, this cemetery was established in 1848 for the city's Roman Catholic community and religious orders by Michael Portier, the first Roman Catholic Bishop of Mobile.
102	Trinity Episcopal Church	Trinity Episcopal Church	August 20, 1990 (#90001240)	1900 Dauphin St. 30°41′12″N 88°05′09″W	This church was designed by Frank Wills and Henry Dudley. It was completed in 1857 for the city's second Episcopal congregation, established in 1845. Christ Church Cathedral was the first. The roof of Trinity Episcopal, as well as the east wall, were badly damaged by the Christmas Day tornado of 2012.
103	Tschiener House	Tschiener House	January 18, 1982 (#82002061)	1120 Old Shell Rd. 30°41′22″N 88°03′43″W	This was the site of a Carpenter Gothic house, built in 1866, that has been destroyed since being listed on the National Register.
104	Turner-Todd Motor Company	Turner-Todd Motor Company	May 29, 2008 (#08000460)	455 St. Louis St. 30°41′32″N 88°02′55″W	This brick commercial building was built in 1926 to house an early automobile company.
105	U.S. Marine Hospital	U.S. Marine Hospital	June 27, 1974 (#74000428)	800 St. Anthony St. 30°41′29″N 88°03′17″W	This Greek Revival hospital building was completed in 1842 for the Marine Hospital Service. It now serves the Mobile County Health Department. It served as a Confederate hospital during the American Civil War.
106	United States Court House and Custom House	United States Court House and Custom House	October 8, 2008 (#08000964)	113 St. Joseph St. 30°41′38″N 88°02′35″W	Federal courthouse that was completed in 1934 in a blending of the Renaissance Revival and Art Deco styles.
107	USS Alabama (BB-60)	USS Alabama (BB-60)	January 14, 1986 (#86000083)	Battleship Parkway; 30°40′54″N 88°00′52″W	This World War II era South Dakota-class battleship now serves as a museum ship and the centerpiece of Battleship Memorial Park. She is one of two National Historic Landmarks housed within the park.
108	USS Drum (SS-228)	USS Drum (SS-228)	January 14, 1986 (#86000086)	Battleship Parkway; 30°40′52″N 88°01′00″W	Housed at Battleship Memorial Park, this World War II era Gato-class submarine is also a National Historic Landmark.
109	Arthur VanderSys House	Arthur VanderSys House	July 12, 1991 (#91000857)	119 Florence Pl. 30°41′21″N 88°05′23″W	This Spanish Colonial Revival style house in the Florence Place subdivision was completed in 1926.
110	Jacob VanderSys House	Jacob VanderSys House	July 12, 1991 (#91000862)	129 Florence Pl. 30°41′24″N 88°05′22″W	This Spanish Colonial Revival style house in the Florence Place subdivision was completed in 1927.
111	Vickers and Schumacher Buildings	Vickers and Schumacher Buildings	December 22, 1983 (#83003474)	707-709 and 711 Dauphin St. 30°41′18″N 88°03′05″W	Completed in 1866, these two commercial buildings once served the Schumacher Carriage Works.
112	Joseph M. Walker House	Joseph M. Walker House	July 12, 1991 (#91000856)	104 Florence Pl. 30°41′17″N 88°05′21″W	This Spanish Colonial Revival style house in the Florence Place subdivision was completed in 1927.
113	Weems House	Weems House	October 7, 1982 (#82001613)	1155 Springhill Ave. 30°41′30″N 88°03′46″W	This late example of Greek Revival residential architecture was completed in 1870.
114	Wilmer Hall		August 1, 2025 (#100012074)	3811 Old Shell Road; 30°41′52″N 88°07′53″W	

== See also ==
- List of National Historic Landmarks in Alabama
- National Register of Historic Places listings in Alabama
