= Neville House =

Neville House may refer to:

- Neville House (Mobile, Alabama), listed on the National Register of Historic Places in Mobile County, Alabama
- Neville-Patterson-Lamkin House Arlington, Kentucky, listed on the National Register of Historic Places in Carlisle County, Kentucky
- Neville House (Staten Island)
- Neville House, formally known as Woodville, listed on the National Register of Historic Places in Allegheny County, Pennsylvania
