= Oakdale Historic District =

Oakdale Historic District may refer to:

- Oakdale Historic District (Mobile, Alabama)
- Oakdale Historic District (Fort Wayne, Indiana)
