= Carolina Hall =

Historic house in Alabama, United States

- U.S. National Register of Historic Places
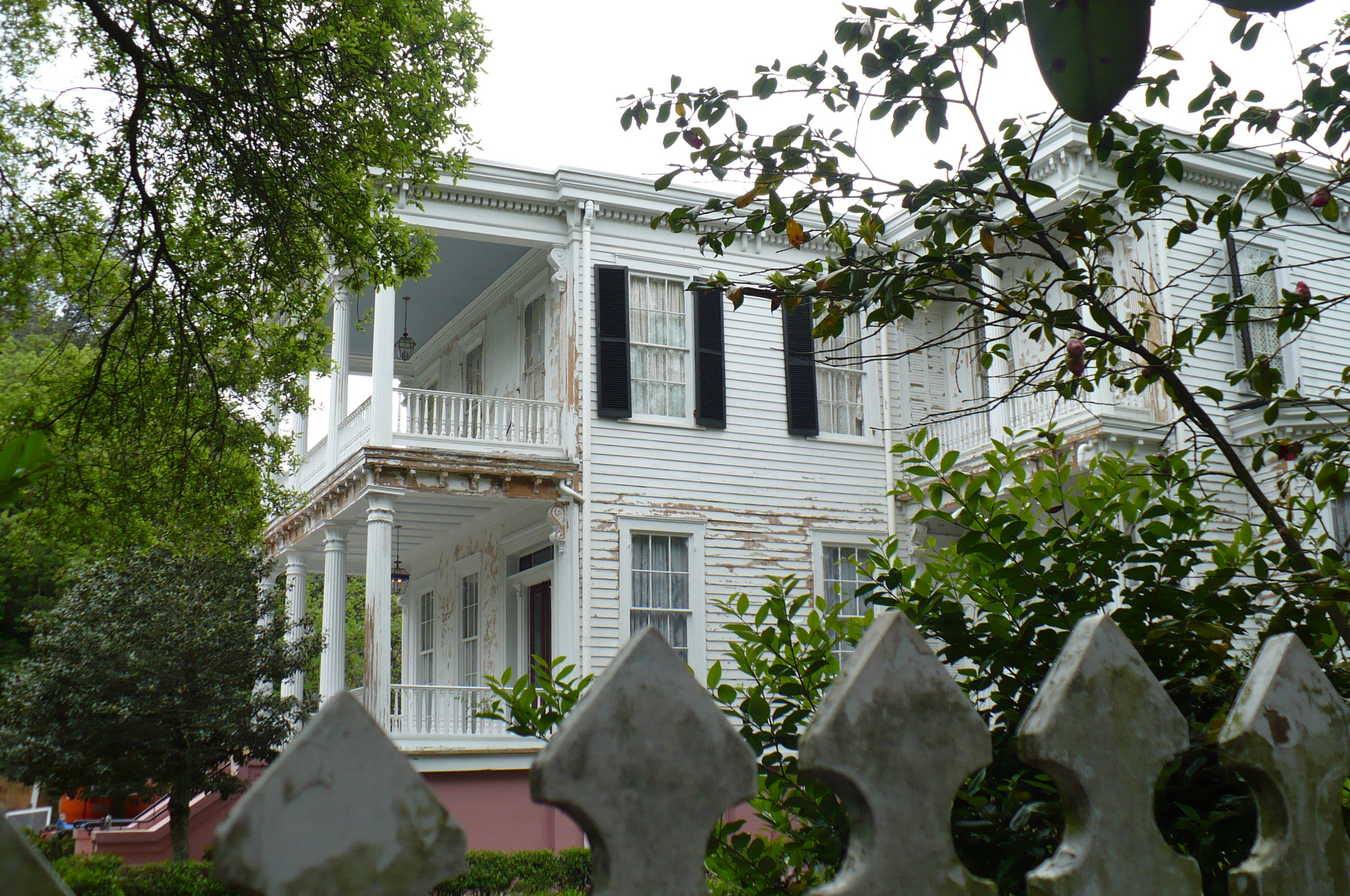
- Carolina Hall in 2008, while undergoing restoration work

- Location within Mobile, Alabama Location within Alabama Location within the United States
- Location: Mobile, Alabama
- Coordinates: 30°41′29″N 88°8′37″W
- Built: 1832
- Architectural style: Early Republic
- NRHP reference No.: 73000362
- Added to NRHP: January 18, 1973

Carolina Hall is a historic residence in Mobile, Alabama, United States. It was built in 1832 in a Federal style and later altered to a Greek Revival style. It was placed on the National Register of Historic Places on January 18, 1973.
