= Joseph Jossen House =

Historic house in Alabama, United States

- U.S. National Register of Historic Places
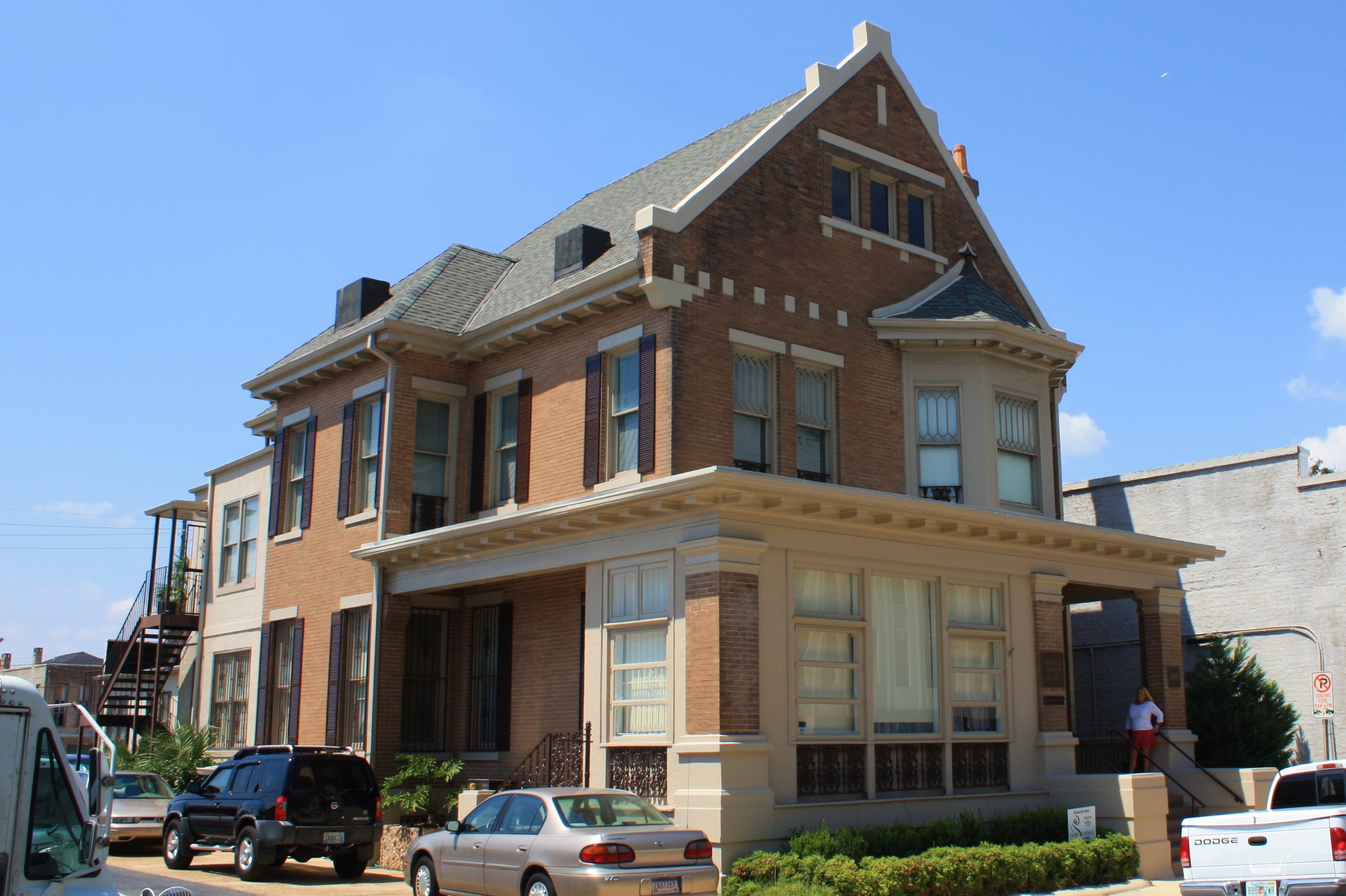

- Location within Mobile, Alabama Location within Alabama Location within the United States
- Location: 109 N. Conception Street; Mobile, Alabama
- Coordinates: 30°41′36″N 88°2′38″W
- Area: less than one acre
- Built: 1906
- Architectural style: Queen Anne
- NRHP reference No.: 92000628
- Added to NRHP: May 29, 1992

The Joseph Jossen House, also known as the World Trade Building, is a historic house in Mobile, Alabama, United States. The 2 1/2-story, brick, Queen Anne–style structure was built in 1906 for Joseph Jossen. Jossen was the local agent for the F.W. Cook Brewing Company, a beer brewing company based out of Evansville, Indiana. The Mobile distribution branch was established by him at 19 South Commerce Street in 1884. Additionally, Jossen was involved in the general liquor trade. In later years the house was adapted for reuse as the local international trade center. During this period the front porch was infilled and a two-story stuccoed addition was added to the rear elevation. As of 2009, the building was occupied by a title insurance company. It was added to the National Register of Historic Places on May 29, 1992.
