= Davis Avenue Recreation Center =

- U.S. National Register of Historic Places
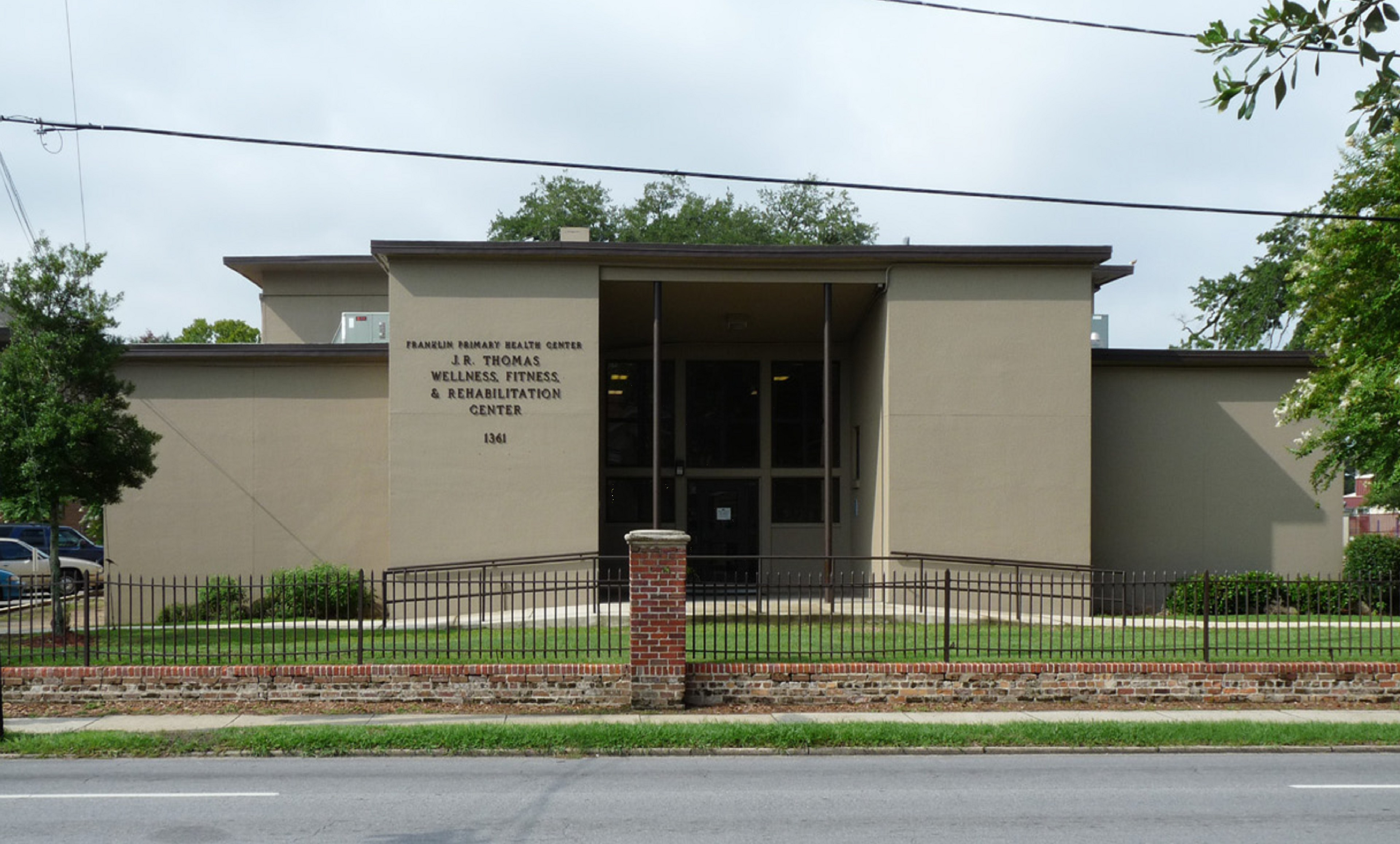
- Davis Avenue Recreation Center in 2011

- Location within Mobile, Alabama Location within Alabama Location within the United States
- Location: 1361 Martin Luther King Jr. Drive; Mobile, Alabama, United States
- Coordinates: 30°42′0″N 88°3′58″W
- Area: Mobile County
- Built: 1936
- Architectural style: Modernist
- NRHP reference No.: 11000407
- Added to NRHP: June 27, 2011

The Davis Avenue Recreation Center is a historic recreation facility in Mobile, Alabama. The facility was established in 1921 as the first public leisure center for African Americans in segregated Mobile. Initially known as the Davis Avenue Community House, it also featured tennis courts, a swimming pool, and a small park. The need for a larger facility was soon realized, and in 1936 the current structure was completed. It was the only public recreation facility in Mobile built using Works Progress Administration funds. It was added to the National Register of Historic Places on June 27, 2011, due to its significance to the African American history in the city.
