= Emanuel African Methodist Episcopal Church (Mobile, Alabama) =

Historic church in Alabama, United States

- Emanuel AME Church
- U.S. National Register of Historic Places
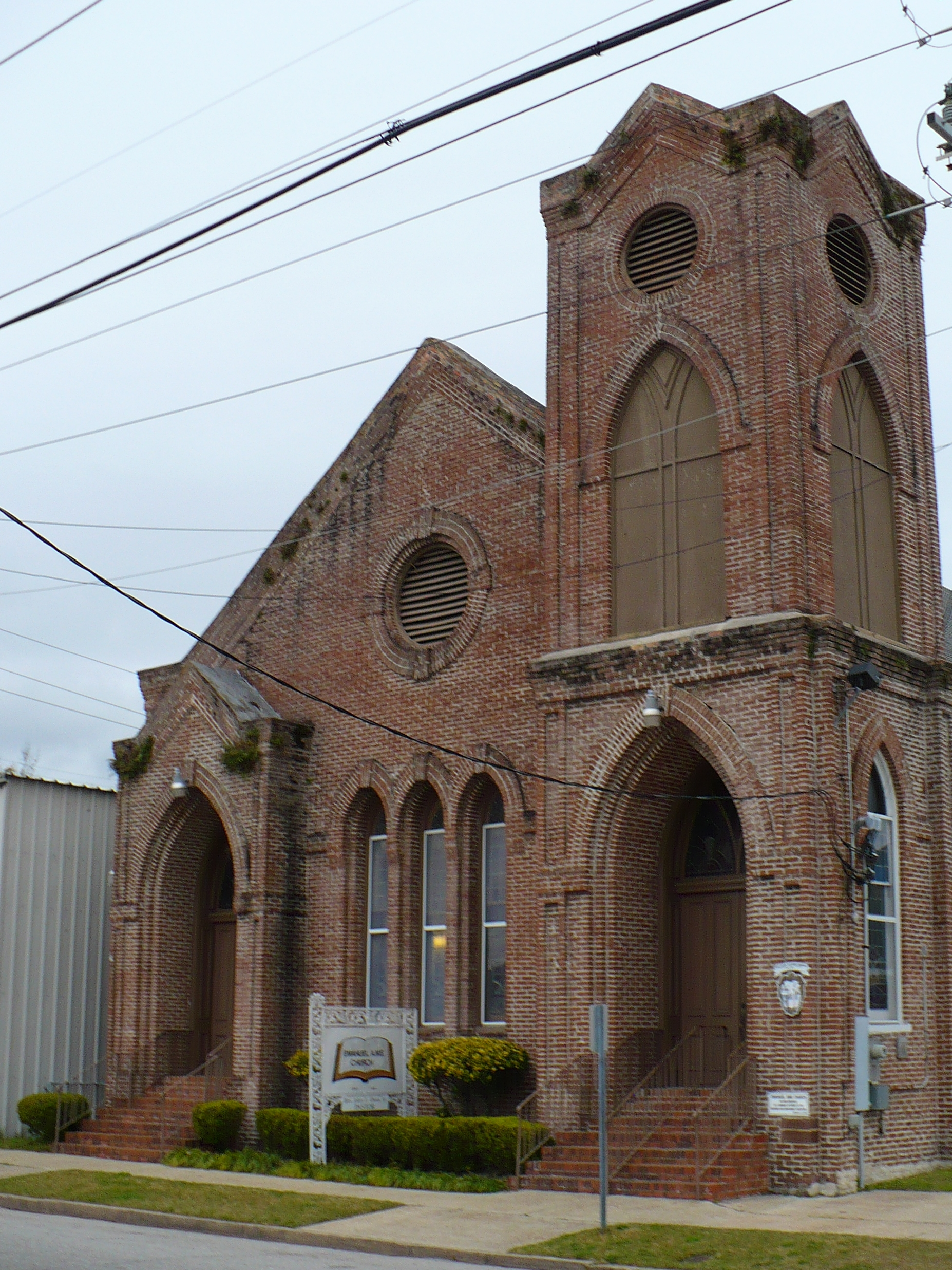
- Emanuel AME Church in 2009

- Location within Mobile, Alabama Location within Alabama Location within the United States
- Location: 656 Saint Michael Street; Mobile, Alabama, United States
- Coordinates: 30°41′26″N 88°3′5″W
- Built: 1869
- Architect: James F. Hutchisson
- Architectural style: Late Gothic Revival
- NRHP reference No.: 87000853
- Added to NRHP: May 29, 1987

Emanuel African Methodist Episcopal Church is a historic African Methodist Episcopal Church congregation in Mobile, Alabama, United States. Emanuel AME began when church trustees purchased a vacant lot for their church in 1869, as African Americans in Mobile established their own congregations following the American Civil War. The trustees completed a frame building in that same year. The frame building was altered in 1881 when James F. Hutchisson, a locally prominent white architect, was hired to design a new facade. The existing building was faced in brick and the facade was redesigned in the Gothic Revival style. This made Emanuel AME Church comparable to white churches in the city and superior to both African American and white rural churches of the period. The building was added to the National Register of Historic Places on May 29, 1987, due to its architectural and historic significance.
