= Vickers and Schumacher Buildings =

- U.S. National Register of Historic Places
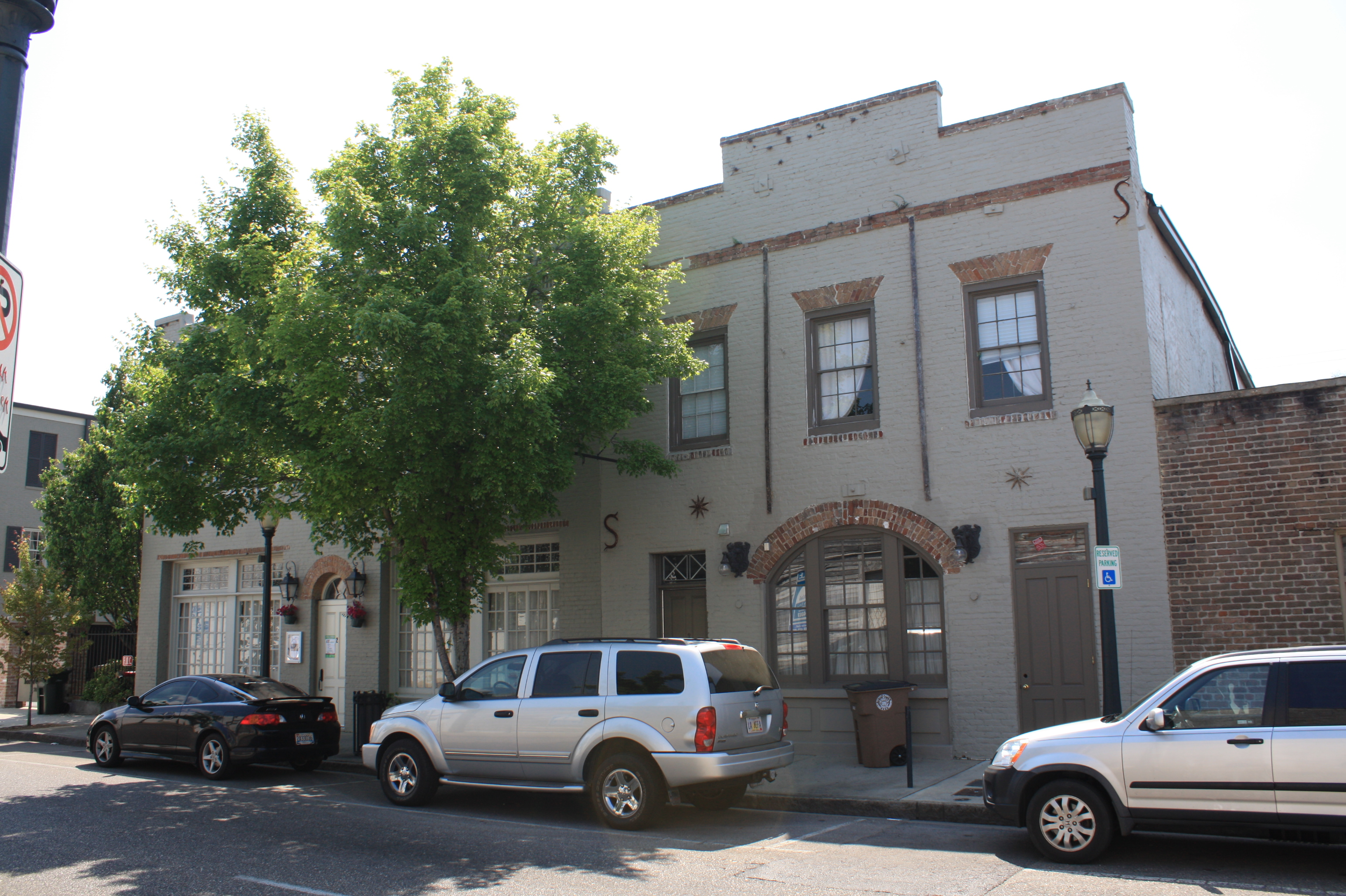
- The Vickers and Schumacher Buildings in 2010

- Location within Mobile, Alabama Location within Alabama Location within the United States
- Location: 709 and 711 Dauphin Street; Mobile, Alabama
- Coordinates: 30°41′18″N 88°3′5″W
- Area: less than one acre
- Built: 1866
- Architectural style: Early Commercial
- NRHP reference No.: 83003474
- Added to NRHP: December 22, 1983

The Vickers and Schumacher Buildings are a pair of historic adjoining commercial buildings in downtown Mobile, Alabama. The two-story brick masonry buildings were completed in 1866 and once served to house the Schumacher Carriage Works. They were placed on the National Register of Historic Places on December 22, 1983. The buildings were purchased by Cornell Family Properties in 2005 and restored.
