= Brisk & Jacobson Store =

- U.S. National Register of Historic Places
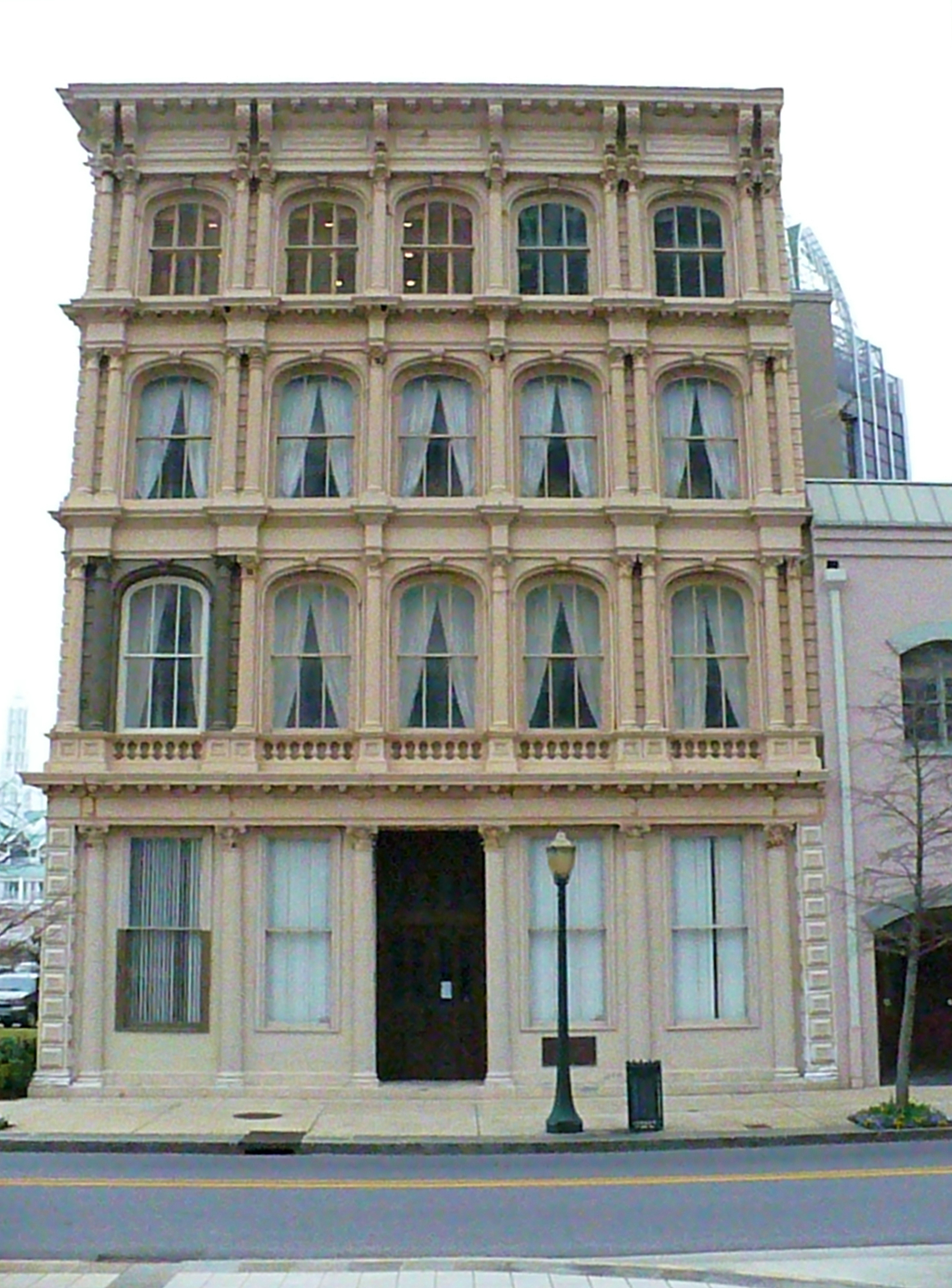
- The Brisk & Jacobson Store building in 2009

- Location within Mobile, Alabama Location within Alabama Location within the United States
- Location: 2 South Water Street; Mobile, Alabama
- Coordinates: 30°41′32″N 88°2′23″W
- Built: 1866
- Architectural style: Italianate
- NRHP reference No.: 73000361
- Added to NRHP: March 14, 1973

The Brisk & Jacobson Store is a historic Italianate-style commercial building in Mobile, Alabama. It was placed on the National Register of Historic Places on March 14, 1973.

== History ==
The site that the Brisk & Jacobson Store building would eventually occupy was previously occupied by a two-story brick building, built by 1850. It housed Daniels, Eglin, and Company, dry goods merchants, from 1852 until 1865. In 1865 the property was purchased for $50,000 by Isaac Goldsmith, of Goldsmith, Frohlichstein, and Company. The new four-story building with a cast iron facade was completed in 1866. The facade was cast by Daniel D. Badger's Architectural Iron Works in New York City.

The Isaac Goldsmith and William Frohlichstein business partnership had ended by 1867, Goldsmith had become president of the Mobile Commercial Savings Company and Frohlichstein had formed a new dry goods company known as Frohlichstein, Hahn and Company. The building was occupied by this firm, as well as by J. Brisk and Company. In 1869 J. Brisk and Company became Brisk & Jacobson, headquartered in Plainfield, New Jersey. It specialized in wholesale and retail men's apparel. The building continued as the Brisk & Jacobson Store until 1893. After that date a succession of commercial enterprises were housed there.
