= Lafayette Heights Historic District =

Historic district in Mobile, Alabama

- U.S. National Register of Historic Places
- U.S. Historic district
- Interactive map of Lafayette Heights Historic District
- Location: Bounded by Dr. Martin Luther King Jr. & Spring Hill Aves., Rylands & Basil Sts., Mobile, Alabama
- Coordinates: 30°41′59″N 88°04′08″W
- Built: 1892–1963
- NRHP reference No.: 14001004
- Added to NRHP: December 10, 2014

The Lafayette Heights Historic District is a historic district in Mobile, Alabama. The neighborhood lies to the northwest of downtown Mobile, straddling St. Stephens Road and centered on Lafayette Street. During the Civil War, the area was the site of the city's earthwork defenses. It began to develop around 1892 as a working- and lower-middle-class neighborhood of mostly modest one-story homes, with larger homes along Lafayette Street. Architectural styles reflect those popular at the time, including Victorian, Classical Revival, Four square, Craftsman, and Minimal Traditional, and some early Ranches.

The district was listed on the National Register of Historic Places in 2014.
