= St. Francis Street Methodist Church =

Historic church in Alabama, United States

- U.S. National Register of Historic Places
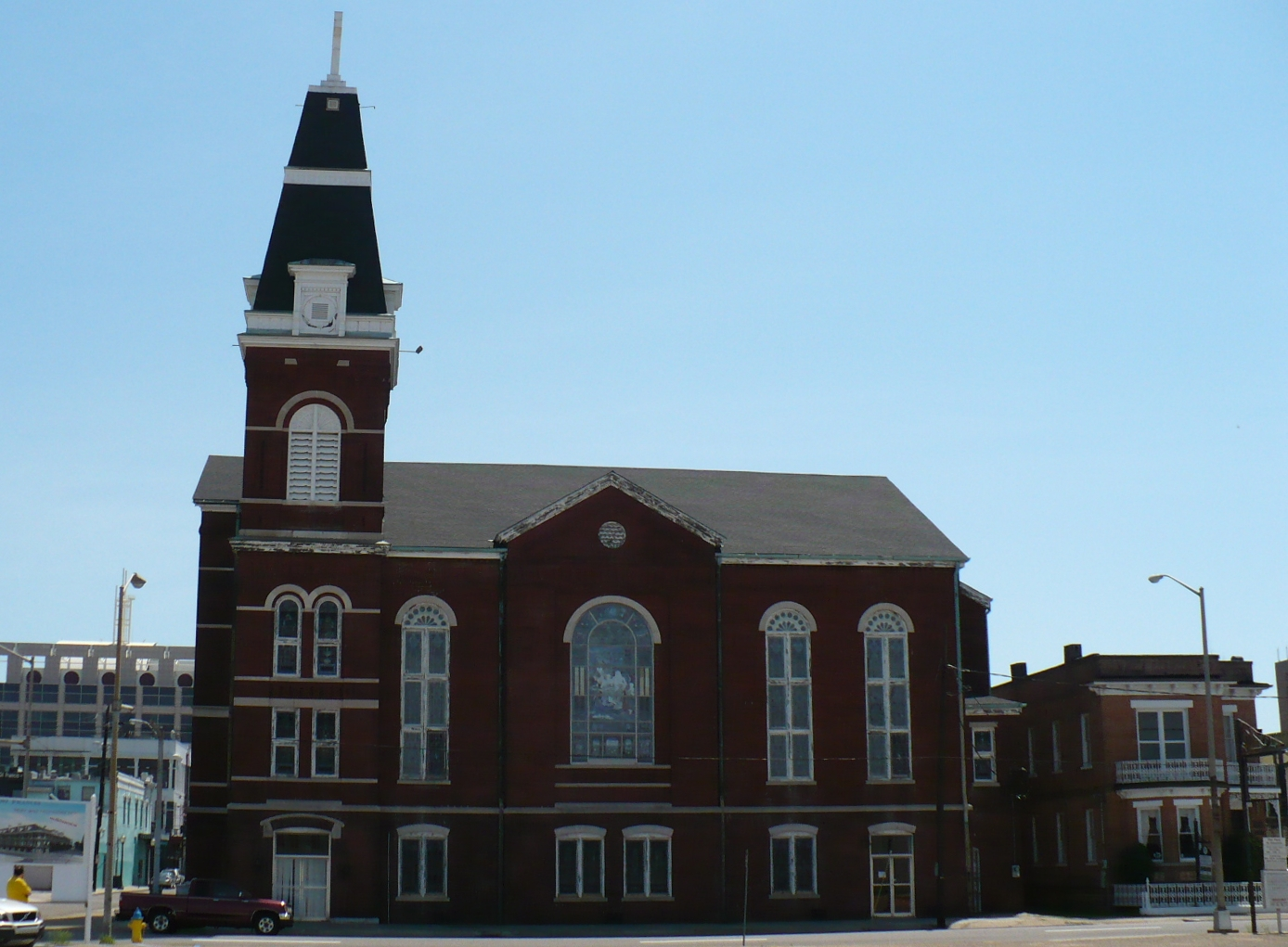
- St. Francis Street Methodist Church in 2008

- Location within Mobile, Alabama Location within Alabama Location within the United States
- Location: 251 St. Francis St., Mobile, Alabama
- Coordinates: 30°41′31″N 88°2′40″W
- Built: 1896
- Architect: Watkins & Johnson
- Architectural style: Late Victorian
- NRHP reference No.: 84000690
- Added to NRHP: January 5, 1984

St. Francis Street Methodist Church, officially St. Francis Street United Methodist Church, is a historic former United Methodist Church building in Mobile, Alabama, United States. The current structure was built in 1896 by the architectural firm of Watkins and Johnson. It was placed on the National Register of Historic Places on January 5, 1984.

Holland Nimmons McTyeire (1824–1889) met his wife Amelia Townsend (1827–1891) in this church. He later founded Vanderbilt University in Nashville, Tennessee thanks to his wife's cousin, Frank Armstrong Crawford Vanderbilt (1839–1885), who convinced her second husband, Cornelius Vanderbilt, the richest man in the United States at the time, to donate US$1 million for its creation.

The church closed in 1993, and in 2015 was renovated for use as a concert and events venue known as The Steeple.
