= Turner-Todd Motor Company =

- U.S. National Register of Historic Places
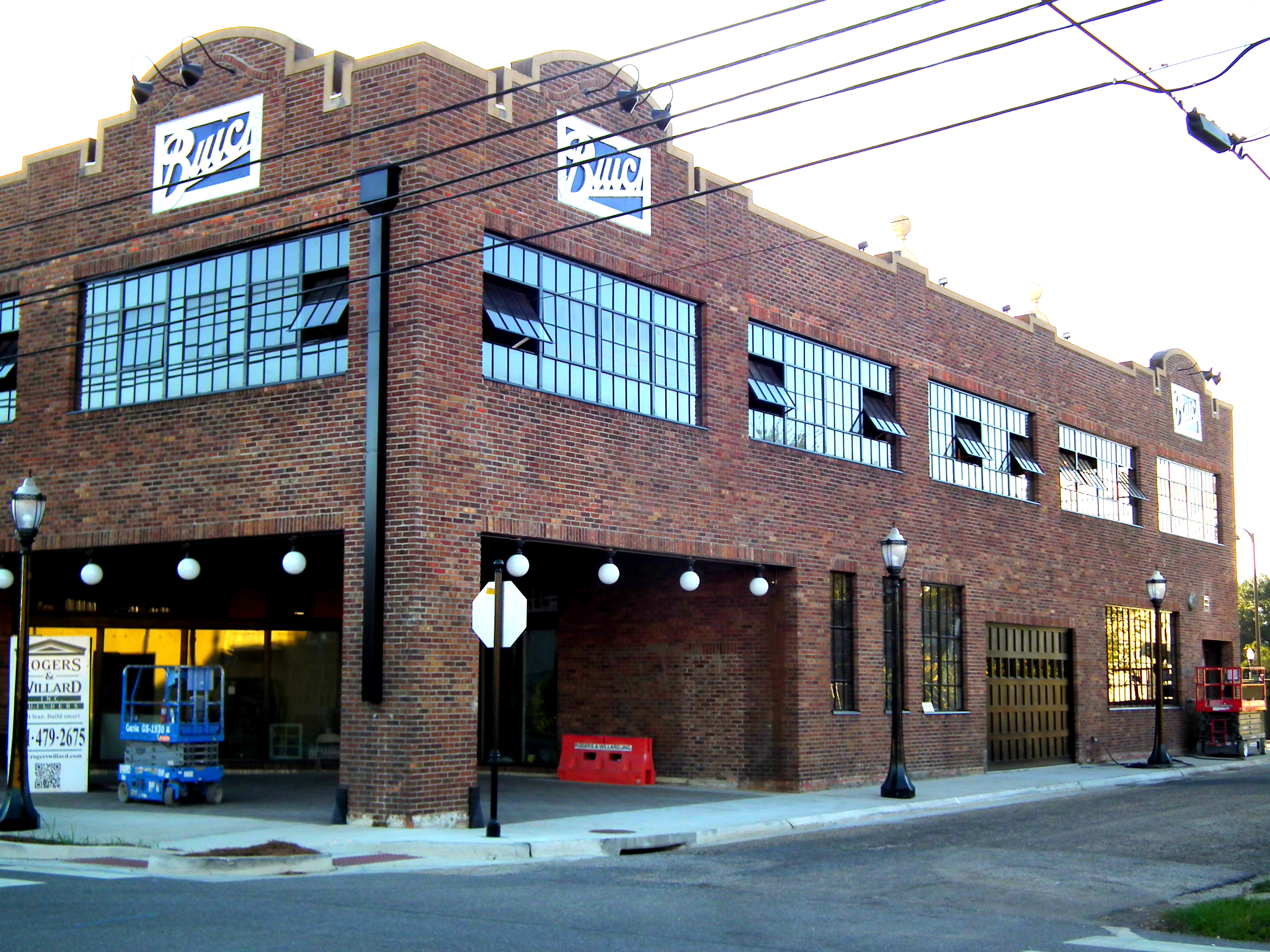
- Turner-Todd Motor Company in 2015

- Location within Mobile, Alabama Location within Alabama Location within the United States
- Location: 455 St. Louis Street, Mobile, Alabama
- Coordinates: 30°41′32″N 88°2′55″W
- Built: 1926
- Architectural style: Early Commercial
- NRHP reference No.: 08000460
- Added to NRHP: May 29, 2008

The Turner-Todd Motor Company Building, more commonly known as the Buick Building, is a historic commercial building in Mobile, Alabama, United States. The two-story brick and concrete structure was built in 1926 to house the Turner-Todd Motor Company. It was placed on the National Register of Historic Places on May 29, 2008.

== History ==
The main two-story portion of the building was constructed in 1926. A l-l/2 -story addition was added to the east end of the building in 1940, as is announced by its own cornerstone. The Turner-Todd Motor Company, which had changed its name to the Turner Motor Company in 1932, closed its doors in 1943, but, though now obsolete as a showroom, the building still remained involved in the automobile industry by housing various auto parts stores from 1944 to 2002, the last of which was CarQuest Auto Parts.

The building is now primarily occupied by property developer Rogers & Willard, Inc., as well as software development firm Rural Sourcing, Inc. who has occupied the building since November 2015.

== Building description ==
As an early example of a purpose built auto dealership, the Turner-Todd Motor Company building is a significant local example of a prevailing architectural style adapted to the purpose of the automobile industry. The interior of the main portion of the building originally had an open arrangement for the display of automobiles. The showroom was located near the entrance on the west end, while offices were located to the rear. This was altered with the closing of the dealership in 1943. The building was subsequently used by an auto parts dealer and a large service counter was added. The interior walls near the east end of the main building, which was used as a service center, are bare structural tile. A distinguishing feature of the first floor is the concrete ramp located at the rear. Entering from the rolled metal door on the south end of the west elevation, cars were driven up the ramp and stored on the second floor. For convenience of foot traffic, a staircase also leads to the second floor. This floor rests on heavy timbers, approximately 6" thick. The walls are brick. The ceiling features exposed wood framing supporting the roof.

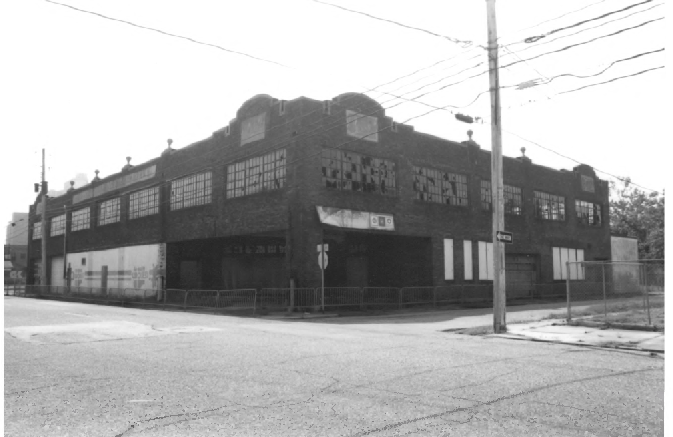
Black & White photo of Turner Todd Motor Company building in 2008

== Restoration (2014-2015) ==
In 2014, Mobile, AL property developer Rogers & Willard, Inc., the current owner of the Turner-Todd Motor Company building, announced that the building would be renovated into modern office spaces and possibly a restaurant space. In September 2015 Rogers & Willard moved into the first refurbished space. The main portion of the first floor has gone through extensive renovations with workspace for around 140 employees in preparation for occupancy by Atlanta-based Rural Sourcing Inc. (RSI), who has occupied the first floor since November 2015.

Among the renovations were the refinishing of all window frames and replacement of all of the original window glass, brick facade repairs, installation of modern plumbing and utility equipment, installation of a larger stairwell and elevator, repaving of sidewalks and the parking lot in the rear of the building, installation of modern HVAC equipment, and the build-out of the internal spaces to provide a modern workspace. Care was taken to honor the history of the building and comply with the guidelines for historic building renovation. As a nostalgic touch, the original Buick logos on the cornices of the building were restored to their original appearance of white letters with blue relief.
