= Martin Lindsey House =

Historic house in Alabama, United States

- U.S. National Register of Historic Places
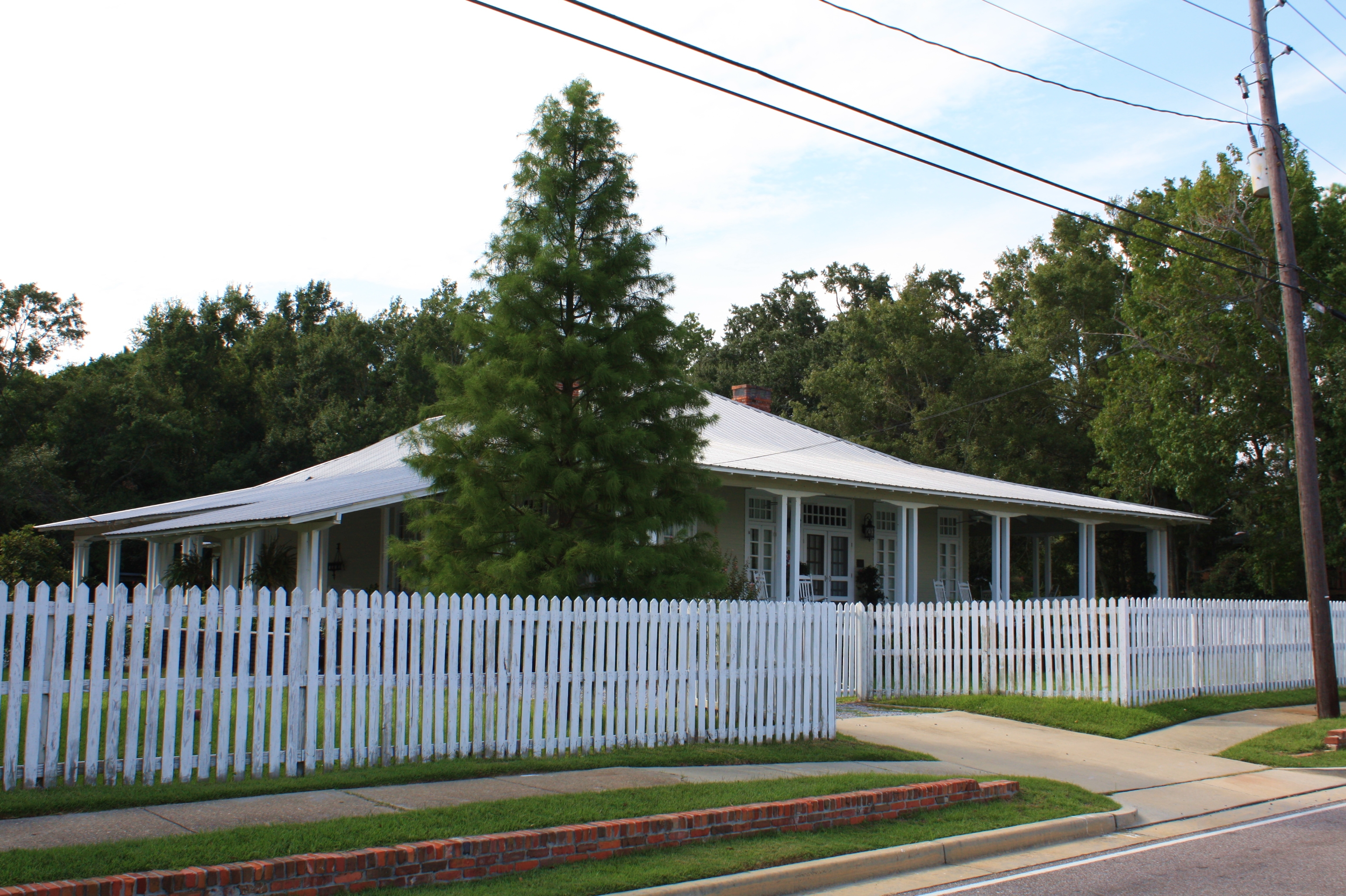

- Location within Mobile, Alabama Location within Alabama Location within the United States
- Location: 3112 Bayfront Road; Mobile, Alabama
- Coordinates: 30°36′24″N 88°3′34″W
- Area: 1 acre (0.40 ha)
- Built: 1915
- Architectural style: Bay house
- NRHP reference No.: 90002176
- Added to NRHP: January 24, 1991

The Martin Lindsey House, also known as the Roy and Barbara Hoppmyer House, is a historic house in Mobile, Alabama, United States. The one-story wood-frame structure was built in 1915 for Martin Lindsey on Mobile Bay, along what was, at that time, the Bay Shell Road. Built in a style known locally as a Bay house, it combines bungalow features with those indicative of much older French Colonial buildings found along the United States central Gulf Coast, such as French doors, instead of windows, opening onto the wrap-around galleries and a roof with flared eaves. Currently owned by the Timothy and Desiree Tait family, it was added to the National Register of Historic Places on January 24, 1991.
