= Washington Firehouse No. 5 =

- Fire Station No. 5
- U.S. National Register of Historic Places
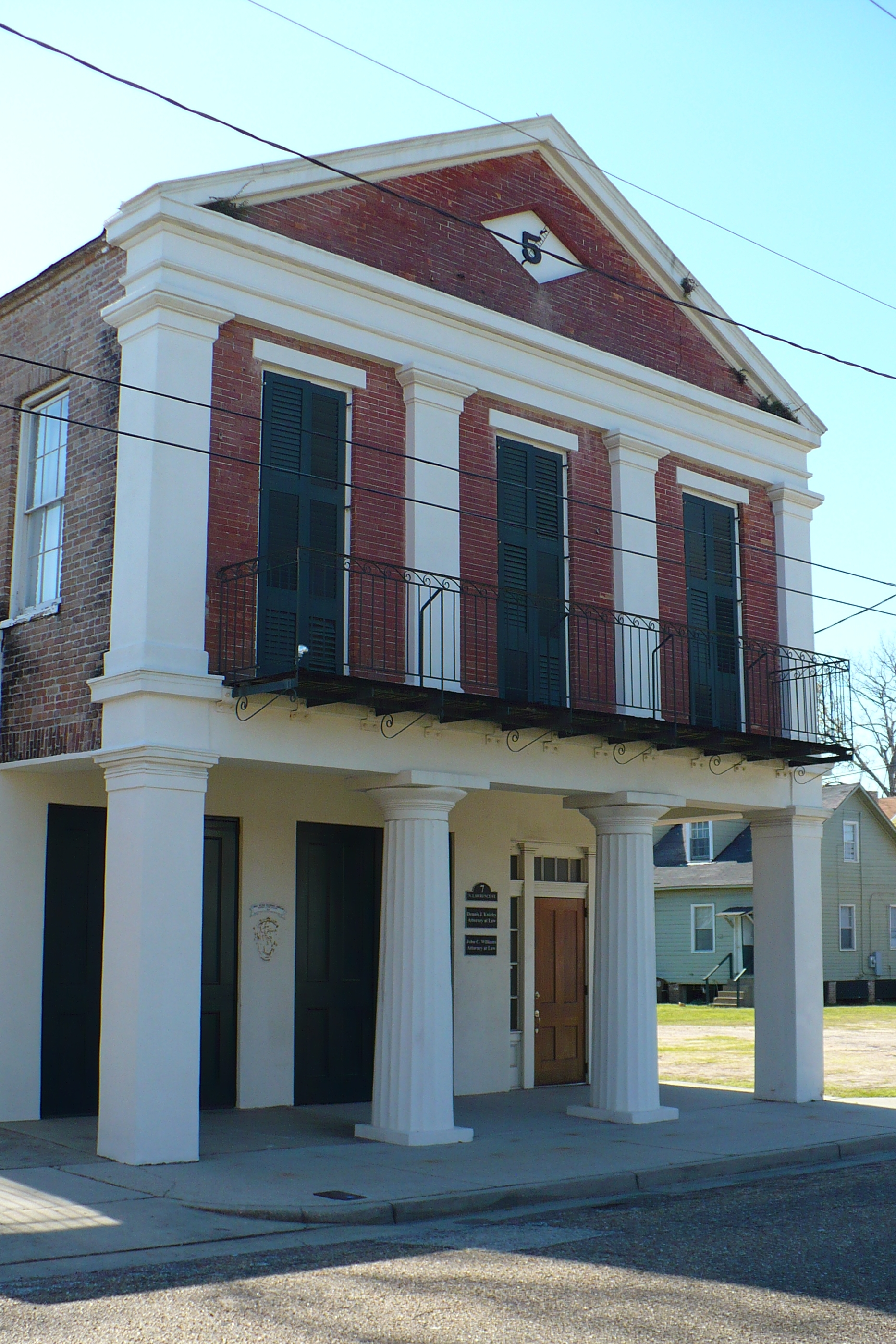
- The building in 2008, currently used to house a legal firm.

- Location within Mobile, Alabama Location within Alabama Location within the United States
- Location: 7 North Lawrence Street; Mobile, Alabama
- Coordinates: 30°41′24.54″N 88°2′54.11″W
- Built: 1851
- Architectural style: Greek Revival
- NRHP reference No.: 83003462
- Added to NRHP: December 22, 1983

Washington Firehouse No. 5, also known as Fire Station No. 5, is a historic fire station in Mobile, Alabama, United States. The two-story brick Greek Revival building was built in 1851 at a cost of $5,500. It was constructed to house the privately run Washington Fire Company. The building features a Doric distyle-in-antis arrangement at the street level supporting an upper story with jib windows opening onto a cantilevered iron balcony. The building was documented by the Historic American Buildings Survey in 1936 and was added to the National Register of Historic Places on December 22, 1983.
