= Campground Historic District =

Historic district in Alabama, United States

- U.S. National Register of Historic Places
- U.S. Historic district
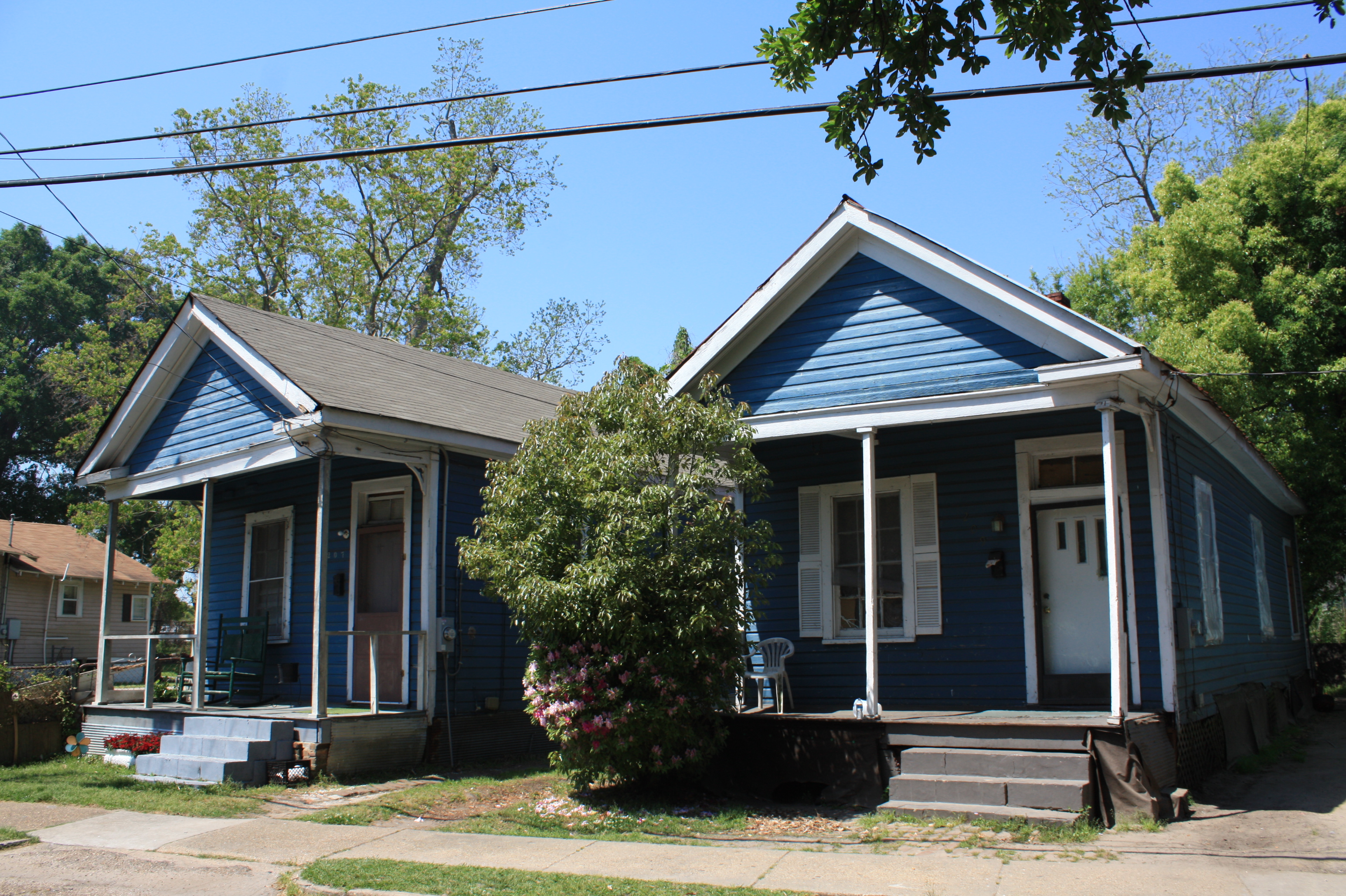
- A pair of shotgun houses on North Ann Street, both built in 1925

- Location within Mobile, Alabama Location within Alabama Location within the United States
- Location: Mobile, Alabama
- Coordinates: 30°41′48.33″N 88°3′59.51″W
- Area: 37 acres (15 ha)
- Architectural style: Queen Anne, Classical Revival
- NRHP reference No.: 05000648
- Added to NRHP: July 7, 2005

The Campground Historic District, also known as The Campground, is a historic district in the city of Mobile, Alabama, United States. Named for the Old Camp Ground, a military encampment that occupied the property during the American Civil War, this historically African-American neighborhood was placed on the National Register of Historic Places on July 7, 2005. It is roughly bounded by Martin Luther King Jr. Avenue, Rylands Street, St. Stephens Road, and Ann Street. The district covers 370 acres (1.5 km^{2}) and contains 166 contributing buildings. The houses range from shotgun houses to bungalows and date from the late 19th century to the middle 20th century.
