= Blue Bird Hardware and Seed =

Historic building in Mobile, Alabama

- U.S. National Register of Historic Places
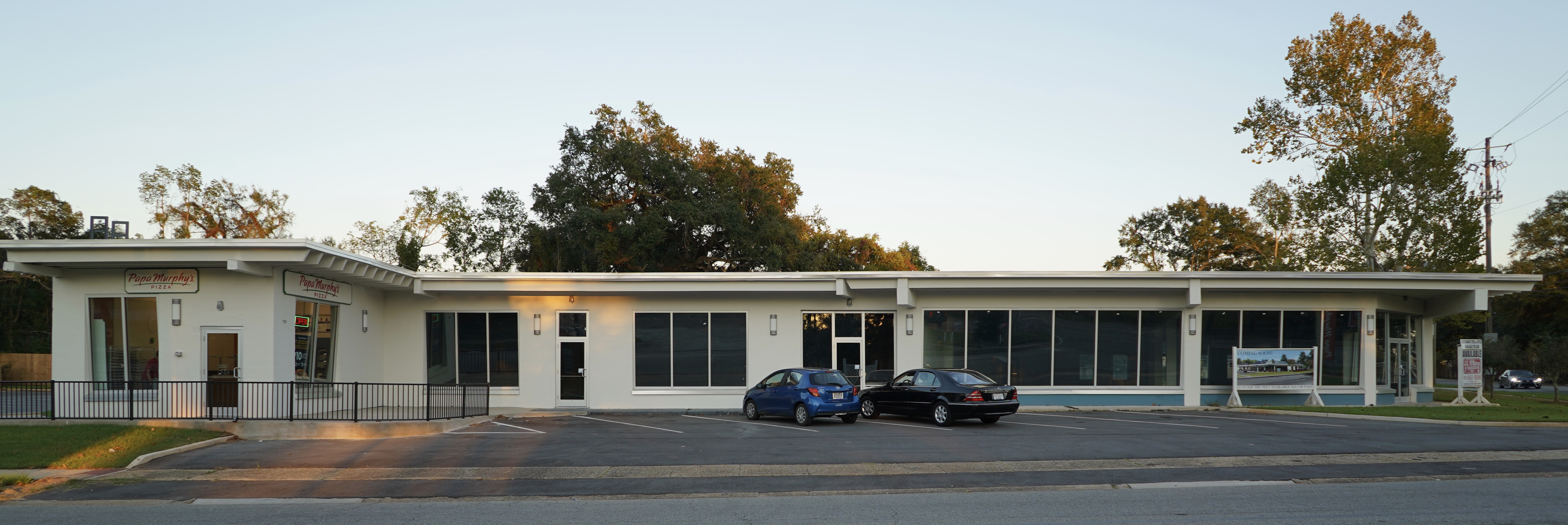
- The building in October 2018
- Interactive map of Blue Bird Hardware and Seed
- Location: 2724 Old Shell Rd., Mobile, Alabama
- Coordinates: 30°41′38″N 88°06′22″W
- Built: 1955
- NRHP reference No.: 100002768
- Added to NRHP: August 13, 2018

Blue Bird Hardware and Seed is a historic building in Mobile, Alabama. It was built in 1955 in Mid-century modern style. It was opened as an agricultural supply store, as the area was largely undeveloped and rural at the time. The building was renovated in 2017 to serve several retail tenants.

The building was listed on the National Register of Historic Places in 2018.
