= Roberts House (Mobile, Alabama) =

Historic house in Alabama, United States

- U.S. National Register of Historic Places
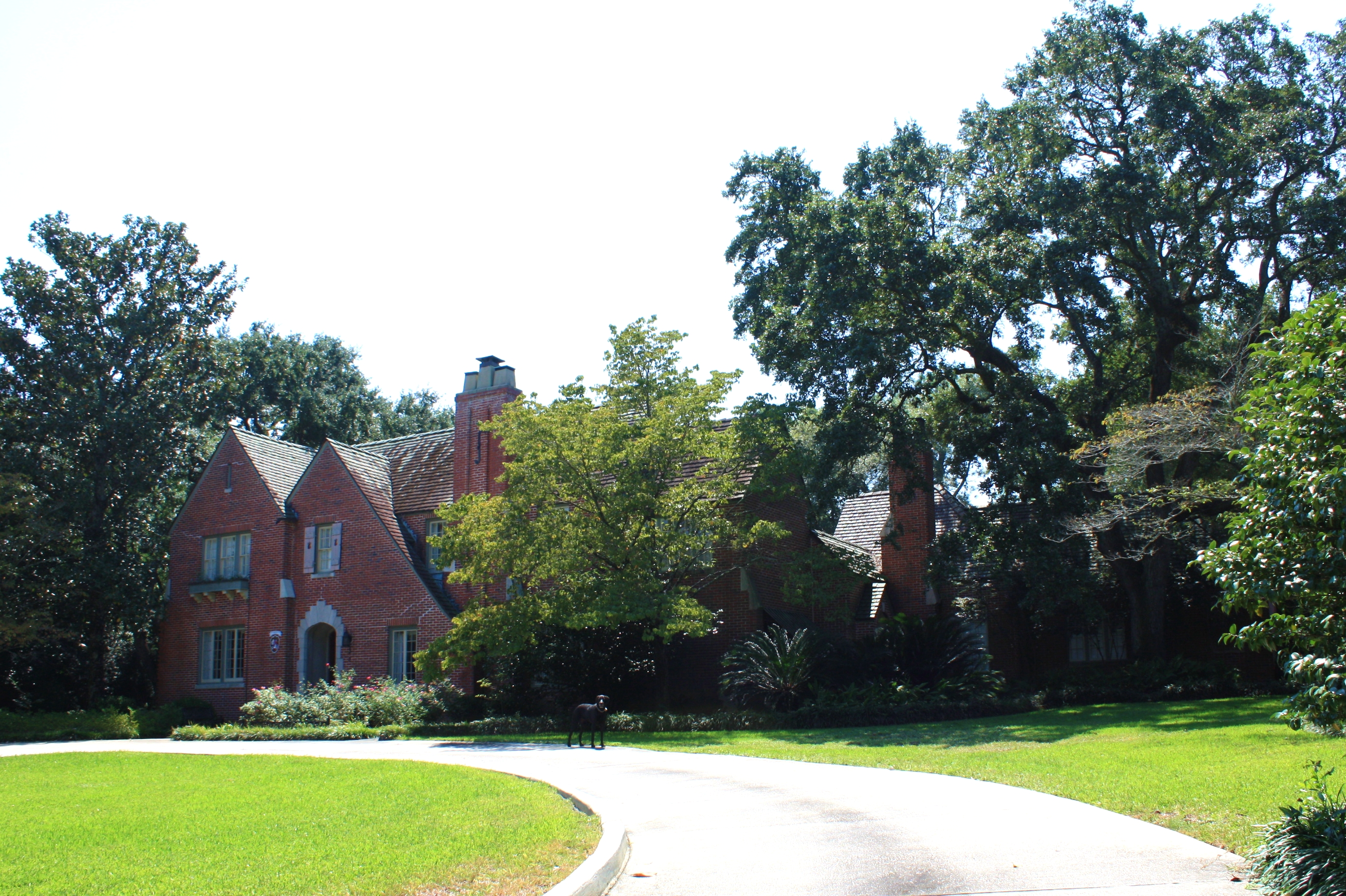

- Location within Mobile, Alabama Location within Alabama Location within the United States
- Location: 3 Wimbledon Drive East; Mobile, Alabama
- Coordinates: 30°41′10″N 88°9′2″W
- Area: 1.3 acres (0.53 ha)
- Built: 1929
- Architect: Pate, J. F.
- Architectural style: Tudor Revival
- NRHP reference No.: 94000789
- Added to NRHP: July 29, 1994

The Roberts House is a historic Tudor Revival style residence and two dependencies in Mobile, Alabama, United States. Built in the 1920s upper-class suburb of County Club Estates, the complex was designed by J. F. Pate. The rambling two-story red brick mansion was completed in 1929. The exterior architecture features steeply pitched gables, prominent chimneys, casement windows, and an elaborate Tudor arch door surround.

Purchased by the John A. Roberts Jr. family in 1988, it was subsequently placed on the National Register of Historic Places on July 29, 1994. It was sold to Dr. Charles F. and Janice M. Jones in 2001.
