= D'Iberville Apartments =

- U.S. National Register of Historic Places
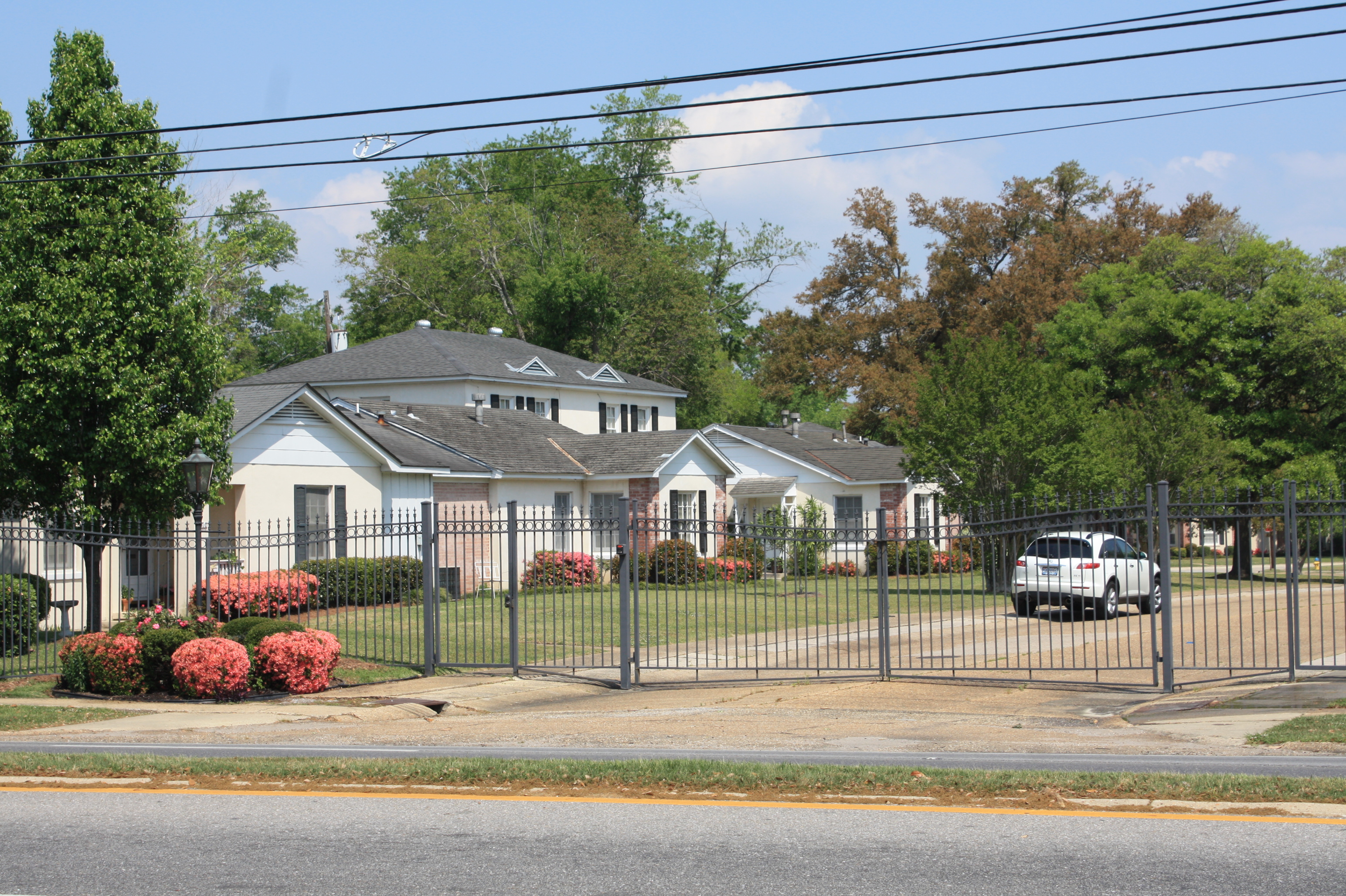
- Units in the D'Iberville Apartment Complex in 2010, viewed from Spring Hill Avenue

- Location within Mobile, Alabama Location within Alabama Location within the United States
- Location: 2000 Spring Hill Avenue, Mobile, Alabama, United States
- Coordinates: 30°41′37″N 88°5′22″W
- Built: 1943
- Architect: Harry Pembleton, Aurelius Augustus Evans
- Architectural style: Minimal Traditionalist
- NRHP reference No.: 04000925
- Added to NRHP: September 3, 2004

The D'Iberville Apartments is a complex of historic apartment buildings located in Mobile, Alabama. They were built in 1943 to the designs of architects Harry Pembleton and Aurelius Augustus Evans. They were constructed in a Minimal Traditionalist style of architecture and are notable for their significance to the community planning and development of Mobile during World War II, a time of tremendous growth in the city. The apartments were added to the National Register of Historic Places on September 3, 2004.
