= Weems House =

Historic house in Alabama, United States

- U.S. National Register of Historic Places
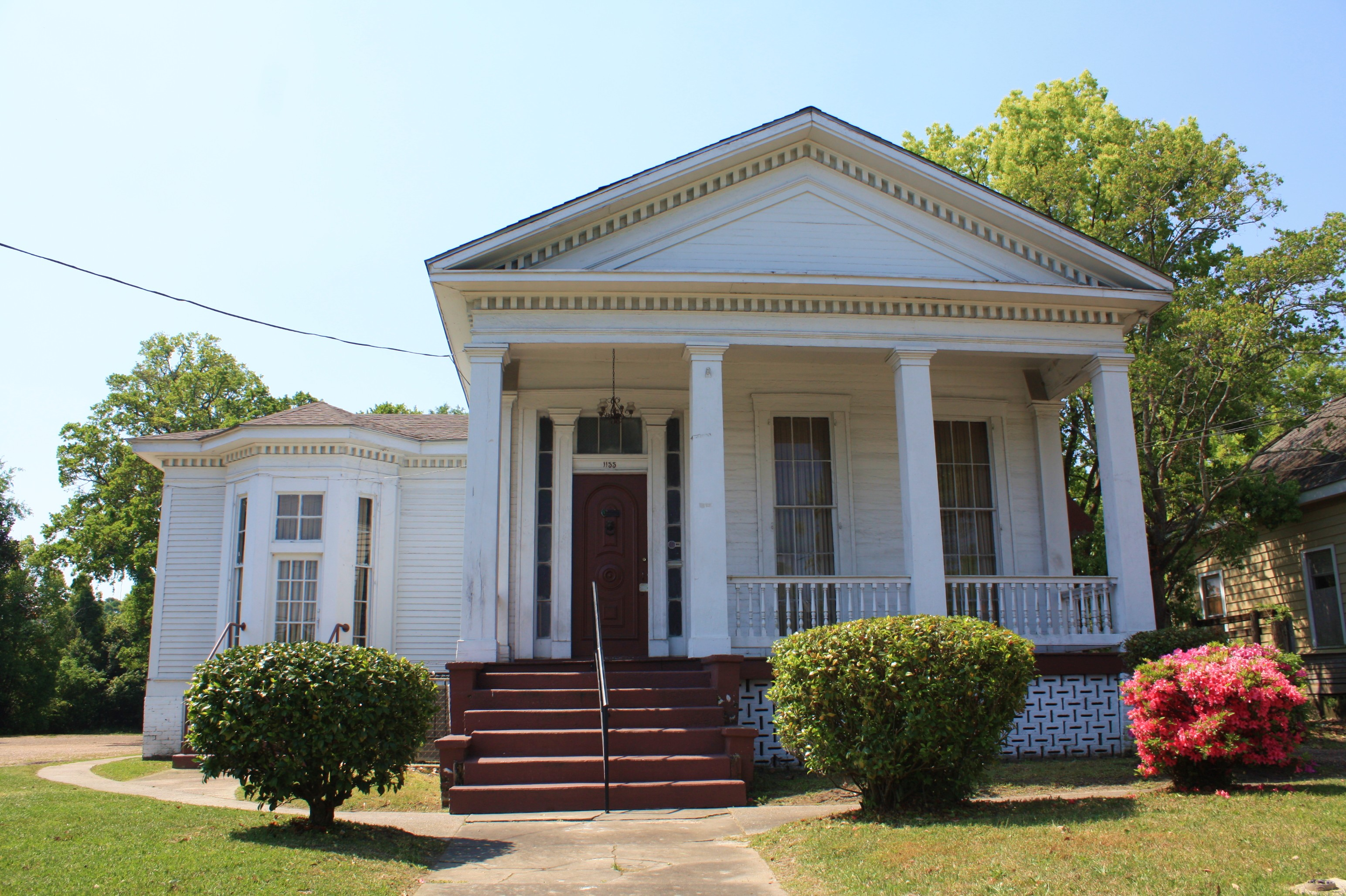
- The Weems House in 2010

- Location within Mobile, Alabama Location within Alabama Location within the United States
- Location: 1155 Springhill Avenue; Mobile, Alabama
- Coordinates: 30°41′30″N 88°3′46″W
- Area: 0.3 acres (0.12 ha)
- Built: 1870
- Architectural style: Greek Revival
- NRHP reference No.: 82001613
- Added to NRHP: October 07, 1982

The Weems House, also referred to as Fowler Cottage, stands as a historic residence in Mobile, Alabama. Constructed in 1870, this single-story building exemplifies the late Greek Revival-style. Recognized on October 7, 1982, it was listed on the register National Register of Historic Places . Initially serving as a private residence, it transitioned ownership on July 18, 1991, when acquired by the Dragons Civic and Social Club, a local fraternal organization.
