= Metzger House =

Historic house in Alabama, United States

- U.S. National Register of Historic Places
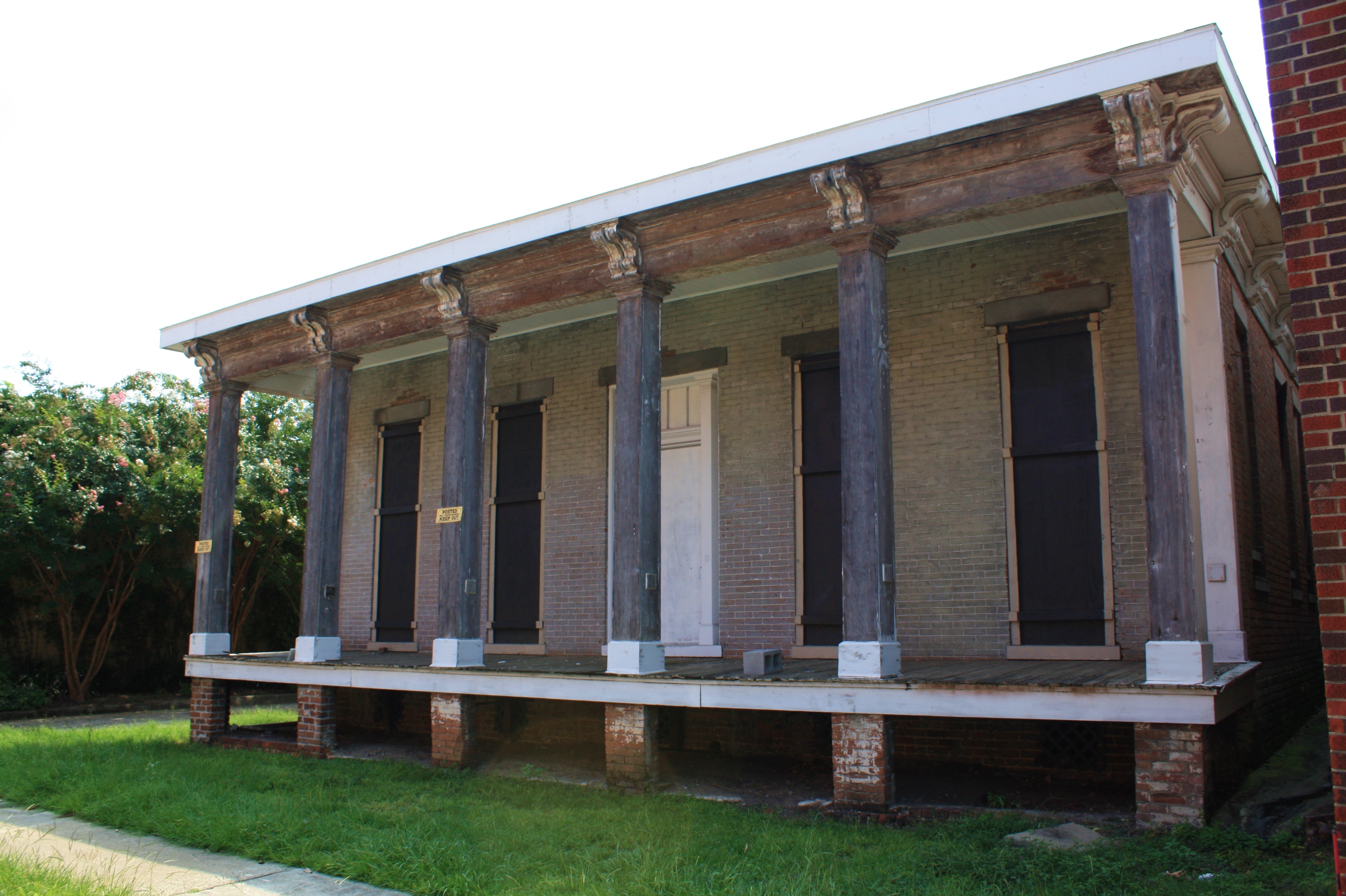

- Location within Mobile, Alabama Location within Alabama Location within the United States
- Location: 7 North Hamilton Street, Mobile, Alabama
- Coordinates: 30°41′25″N 88°2′51″W
- Built: 1875
- NRHP reference No.: 84000675
- Added to NRHP: January 5, 1984

The Metzger House is a historic residence in Mobile, Alabama, United States. The one-story Italianate-influenced brick structure was built by the Metzger family in 1875. It was added to the National Register of Historic Places on January 5, 1984, due to its architectural significance.
