= Tschiener House =

- U.S. National Register of Historic Places
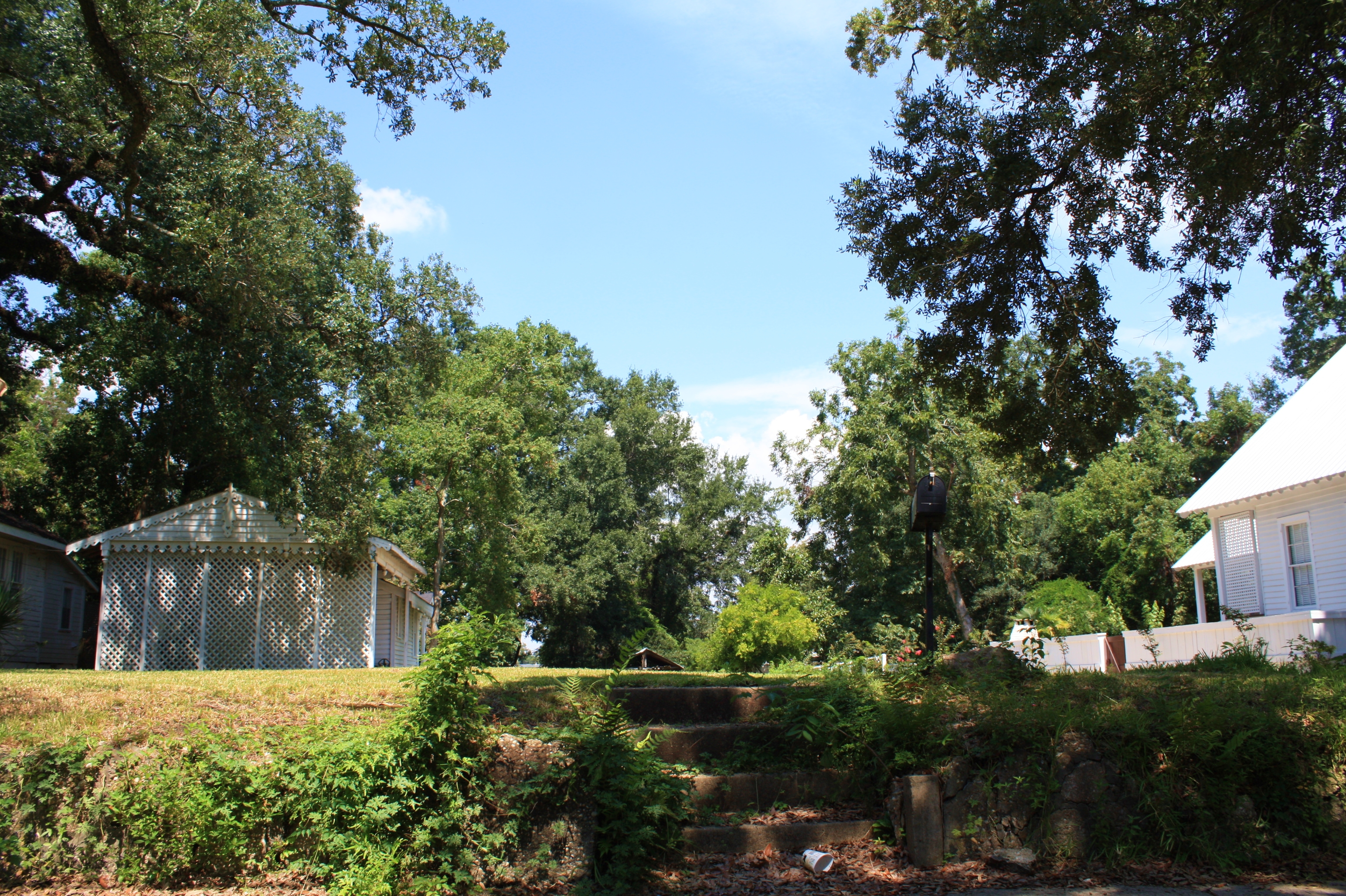
- The site of the Tschiener House. A former outbuilding on the site retains its Carpenter Gothic details.

- Location within Mobile, Alabama Location within Alabama Location within the United States
- Location: 1120 Old Shell Road; Mobile, Alabama
- Coordinates: 30°41′22″N 88°3′43″W
- Built: 1866
- Architectural style: Carpenter Gothic
- NRHP reference No.: 82002061
- Added to NRHP: January 18, 1982

The Tschiener House, also known as the Dumas School, was a historic residence in Mobile, Alabama, United States. The Carpenter Gothic structure was built in 1866. It was placed on the National Register of Historic Places on January 18, 1982. It was later destroyed by fire. One former outbuilding remains at the site.
