= U. J. Cleveland House =

Historic house in Alabama, United States

- U.S. National Register of Historic Places
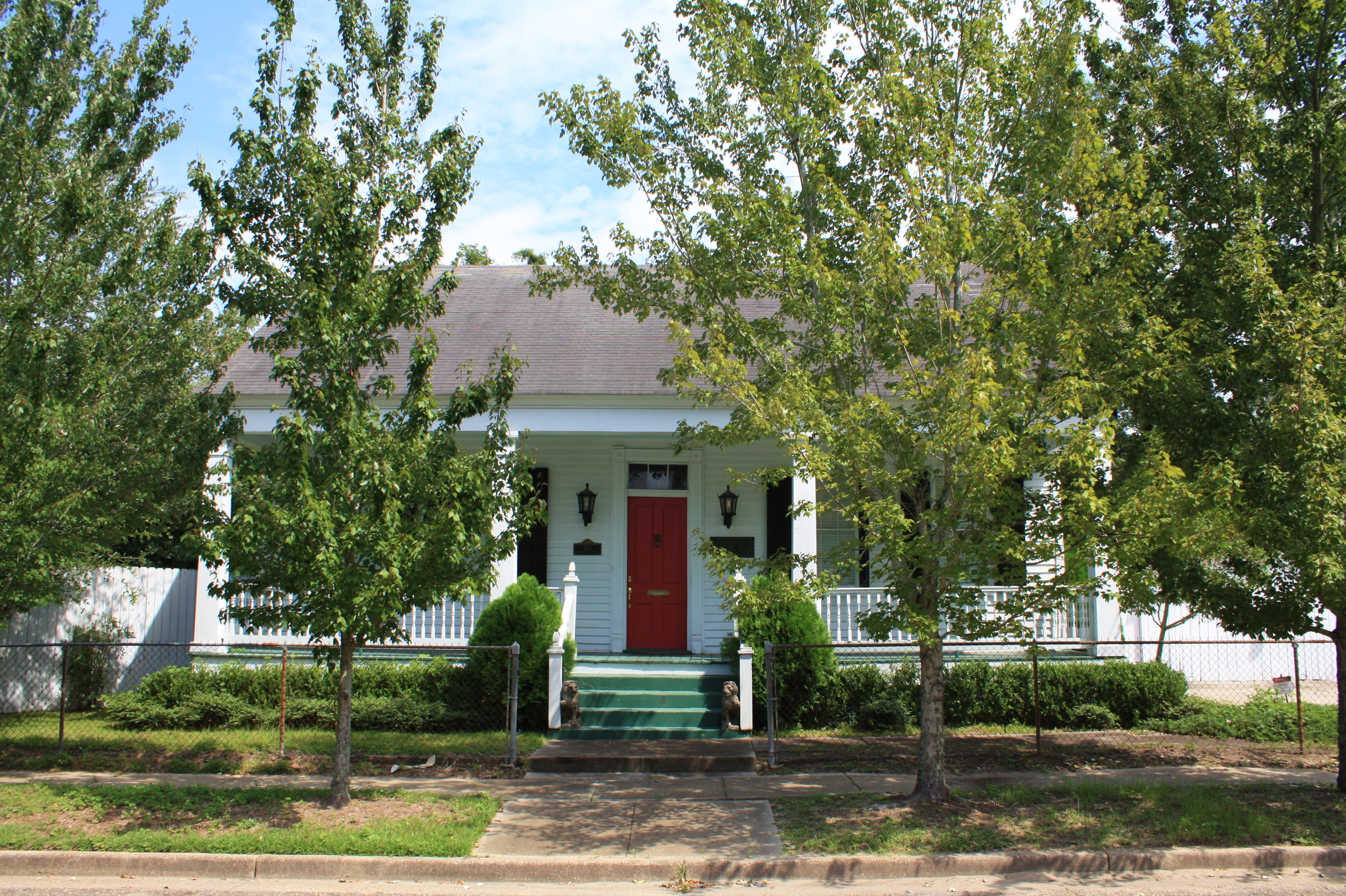

- Location within Mobile, Alabama Location within Alabama Location within the United States
- Location: 551 Charles Street, Mobile, Alabama
- Coordinates: 30°40′35″N 88°3′24″W
- Area: less than one acre
- Built: 1853
- Architectural style: Gulf Coast Cottage
- NRHP reference No.: 93000420
- Added to NRHP: May 21, 1993

The U. J. Cleveland House (also known as the Thomas Smith House) is a historic house located at 551 Charles Street in Mobile, Alabama. It is locally significant as an intact Gulf Coast Cottage with an unusual interior plan.

== Description and history ==
The 1 1/2-story wood-frame structure, on brick piers, was built in 1853 in the Gulf Coast Cottage style. The interior plan of the house is unusual for Mobile, featuring a back hall dining room. The front door leads into a narrow hall, with the staircase running immediately up to the half story.

It was placed on the National Register of Historic Places on May 21, 1993.
