= Emanuel Building =

- U.S. National Register of Historic Places
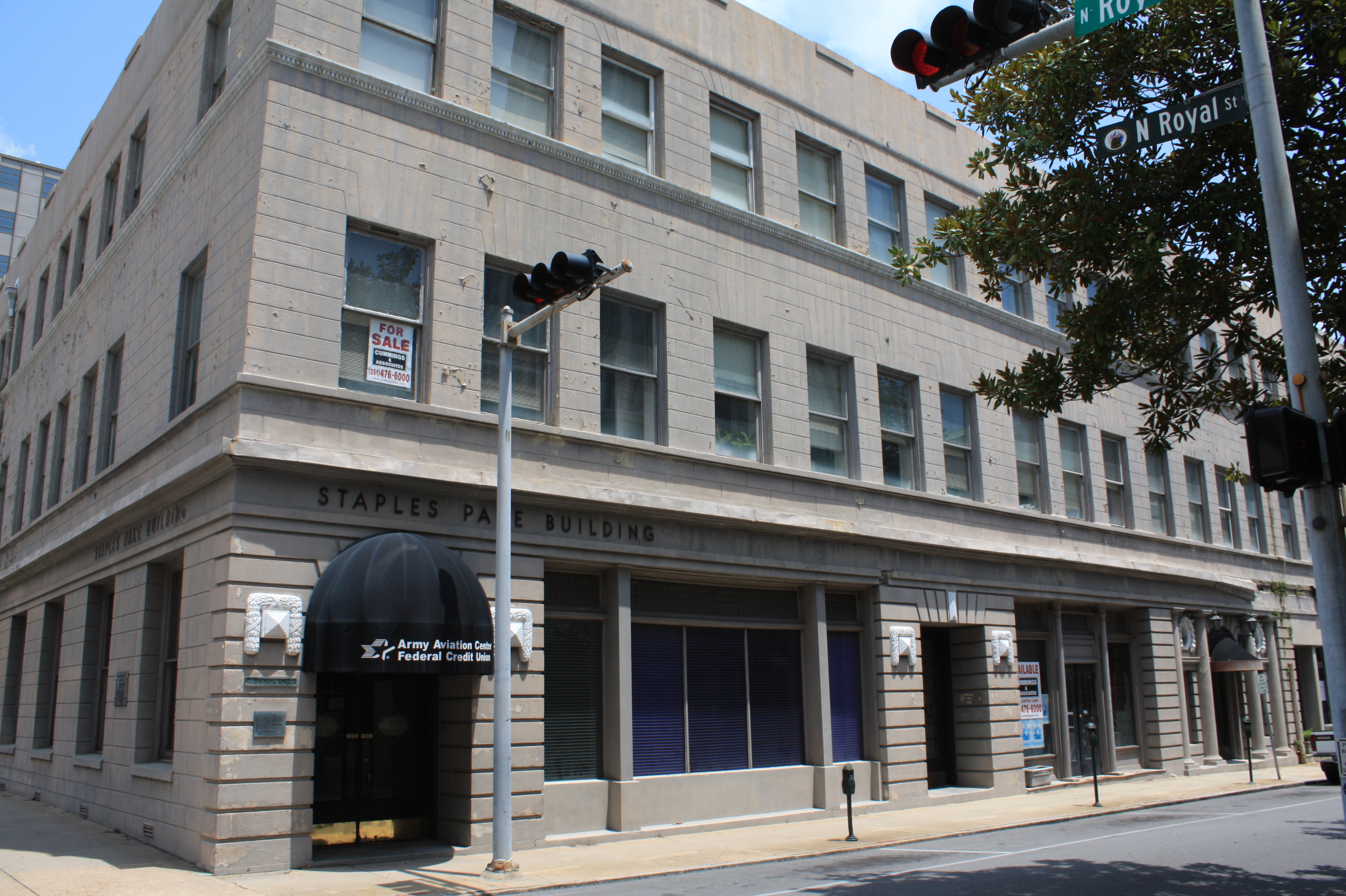

- Location within Mobile, Alabama Location within Alabama Location within the United States
- Location: 100 North Royal Street, Mobile, Alabama
- Coordinates: 30°41′38″N 88°2′28″W
- Built: 1850
- Architect: George Bigelow Rogers (remodeled)
- Architectural style: Late 19th And 20th Century Revivals, Federal, Italian Renaissance
- NRHP reference No.: 78000503
- Added to NRHP: March 21, 1978

The Emanuel Building, also known as the Bank of Mobile and Staples-Pake Building, is a historic commercial building in Mobile, Alabama, United States. The three-story masonry structure was built in 1850 and then remodeled several times over the next century. It was placed on the National Register of Historic Places on March 21, 1978.

The significance of the Staples-Pake Building is both architectural and commercial. Initially constructed in the 1850s as office space by a Mobile cotton broker, Jonathan Emanuel, the structure was remodeled in 1903 by George Bigelow Rogers.
