= South Lafayette Street Creole Cottages =

Historic house in Alabama, United States

- U.S. National Register of Historic Places
- Location within Mobile, Alabama Location within Alabama Location within the United States
- Location: Mobile, Alabama
- Coordinates: 30°41′8″N 88°4′17″W
- Built: 1852
- Architect: Multiple
- Architectural style: Creole cottage
- NRHP reference No.: 76000346
- Added to NRHP: November 7, 1976

The South Lafayette Street Creole Cottages is a grouping of three historic Creole cottages on South Lafayette Street in Mobile, Alabama, United States. They were built in 1852. All three were placed as a group on the National Register of Historic Places on November 7, 1976.

South Lafayette Street Creole Cottages
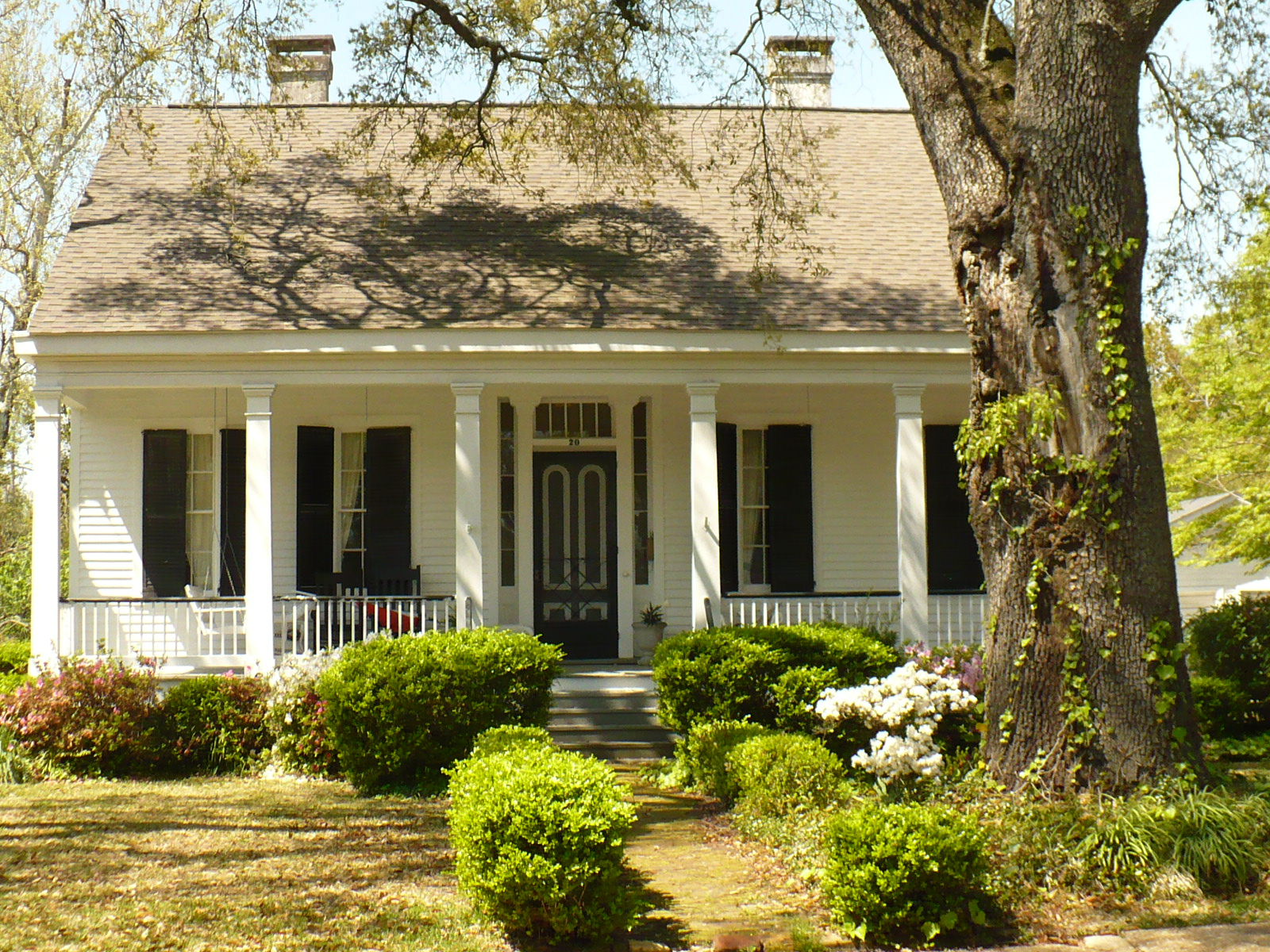
Hobbs-Harris House, 20 South Lafayette Street

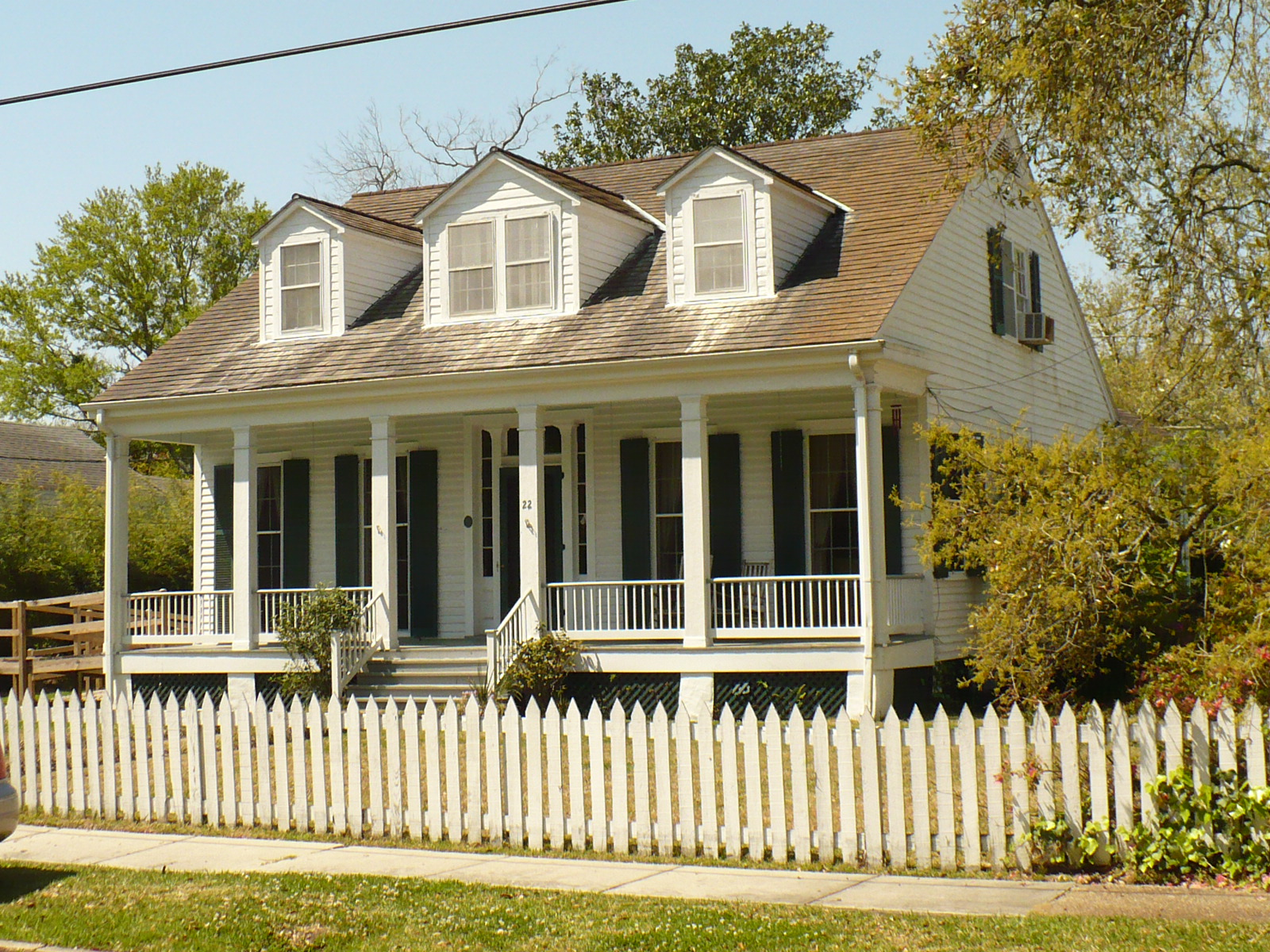
Dorgan-Holmes House, 22 South Lafayette Street

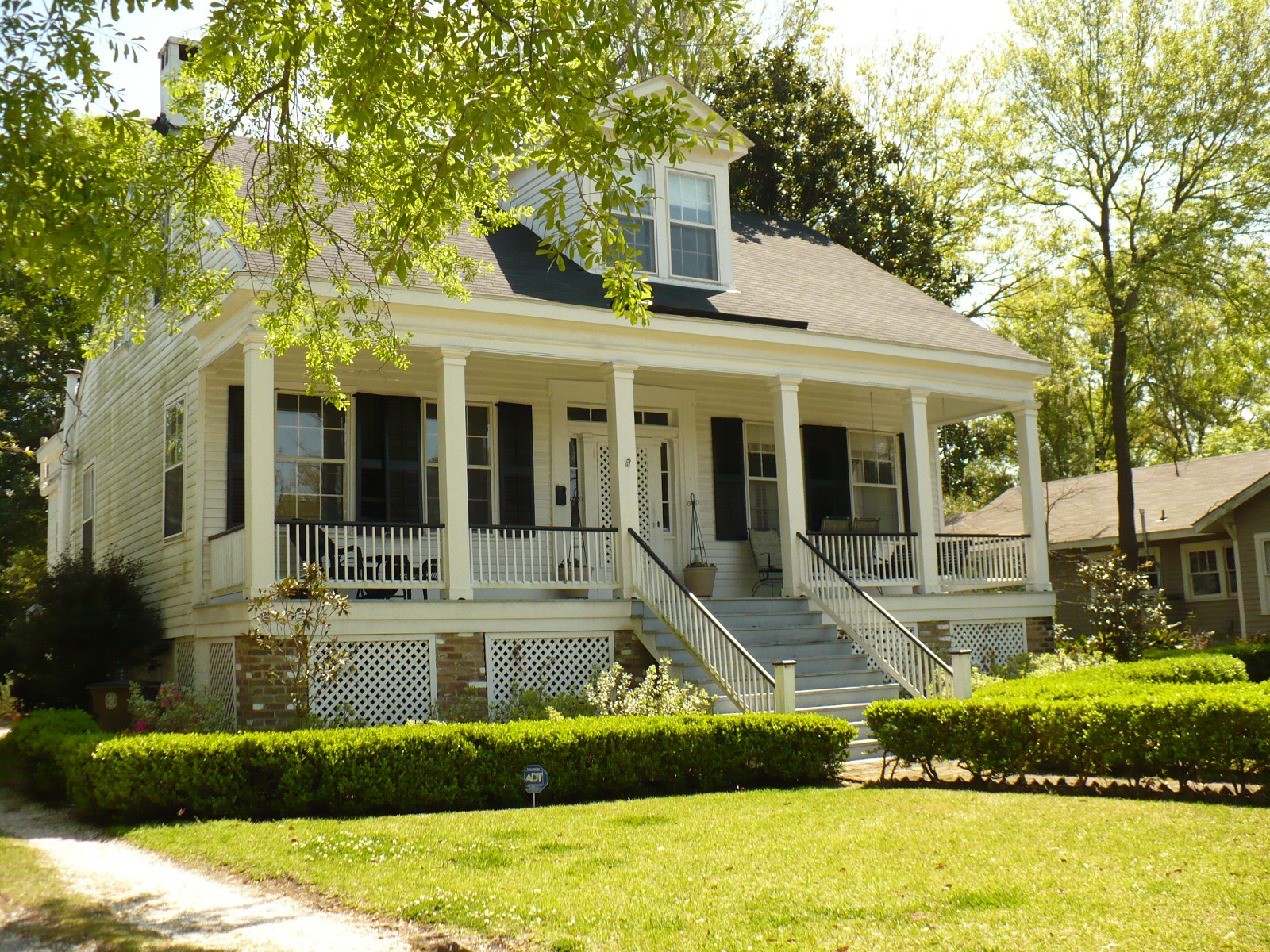
March-Erickson House, 23 South Lafayette Street
