= Neville House (Mobile, Alabama) =

Historic house in Alabama, United States

- U.S. National Register of Historic Places
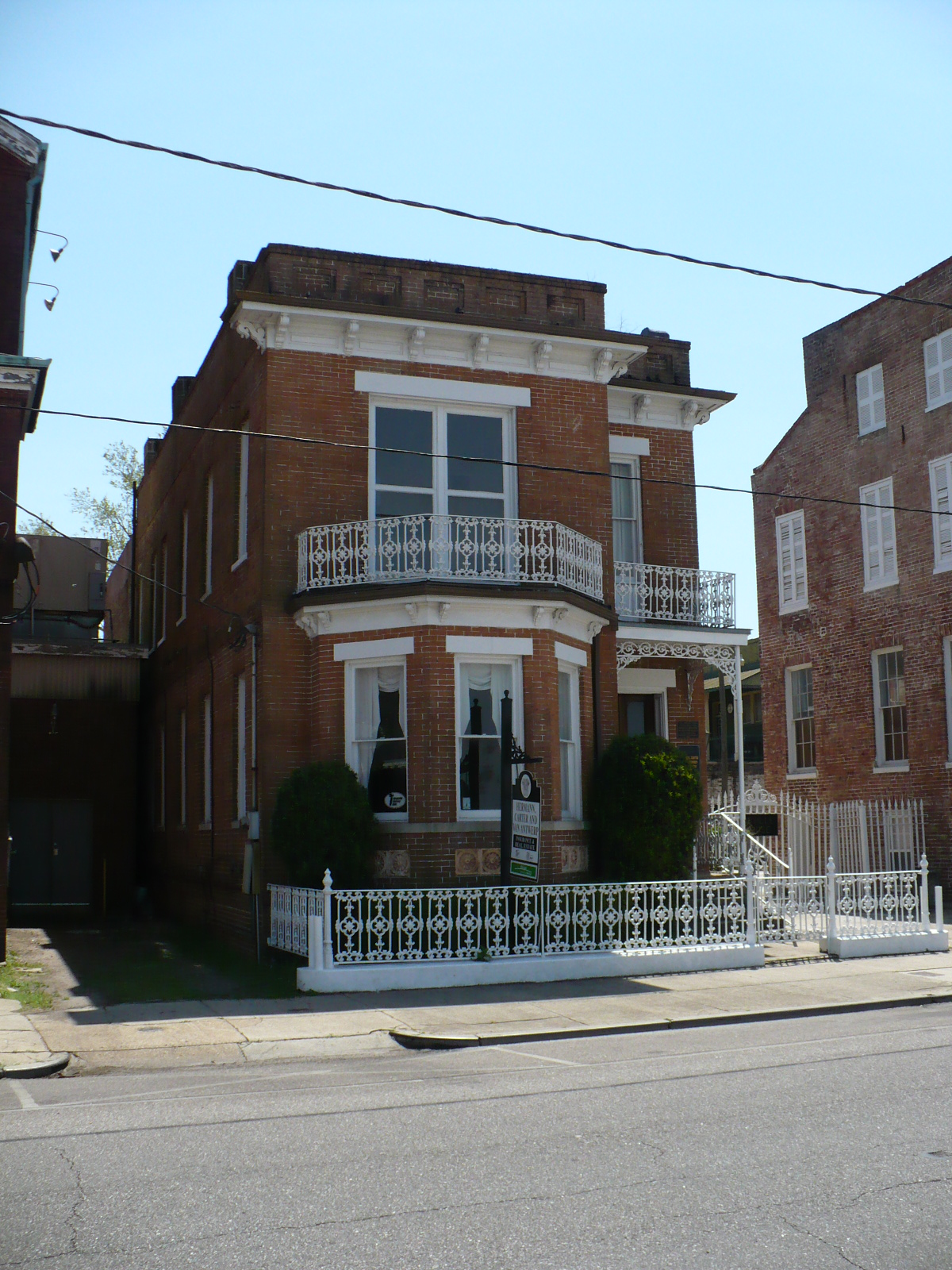
- The Neville House in 2008.

- Location within Mobile, Alabama Location within Alabama Location within the United States
- Location: Mobile, Alabama
- Coordinates: 30°41′31″N 88°2′41″W
- Built: 1896
- Architectural style: Italianate
- NRHP reference No.: 84000682
- Added to NRHP: January 5, 1984

The Neville House is a historic brick townhouse in Mobile, Alabama, United States. It was built in 1896, in an Italianate-influenced style. The building was placed on the National Register of Historic Places on January 5, 1984.
