= Oakdale Historic District (Mobile, Alabama) =

Historic district in Mobile, Alabama

- U.S. National Register of Historic Places
- U.S. Historic district
- Interactive map of Oakdale Historic District
- Location: Bounded by I-10, Preston Ave., Virginia & Ann Sts., Mobile, Alabama
- Coordinates: 30°39′58″N 88°03′47″W
- Built: 1853–1962
- NRHP reference No.: 14001005
- Added to NRHP: December 10, 2014

The Oakdale Historic District is a historic district in Mobile, Alabama. Oakdale is located south of downtown, and developed in the late 19th and early 20th centuries. It consists of 511 acres (207 ha) and about 1200 buildings, most of which are middle-class one- and two-story houses. Early development was closest to the trolley lines on Broad Street, Washington Avenue, Marine Street, and Ann Street. The houses reflect the nationally popular styles of their times, including Victorian, Classical Revival, Four square, Craftsman, and Minimal Traditional, and also local styles such as Gulf Coast Cottages (Miller–O'Donnell House). Several churches are also in the district, such as the Neoclassical St. Matthew's Catholic Church.

The district was listed on the National Register of Historic Places in 2014.
