= Brunel House =

Brunel House or Brunell House may refer to:

- Brunel House, Cardiff, UK
- Brunel House, a Grade II-listed building on Westbourne Terrace, London
- Governor's Club, also known as "Brunell House", at 11866 Magnolia Street in Magnolia Springs, Alabama, US
- Brunell House (Jessamine St., Magnolia Springs, Alabama), a National Register of Historic Places listings in Baldwin County, Alabama, US
