= Foley Downtown Historic District =

Historic district in Alabama, United States

- U.S. National Register of Historic Places
- U.S. Historic district
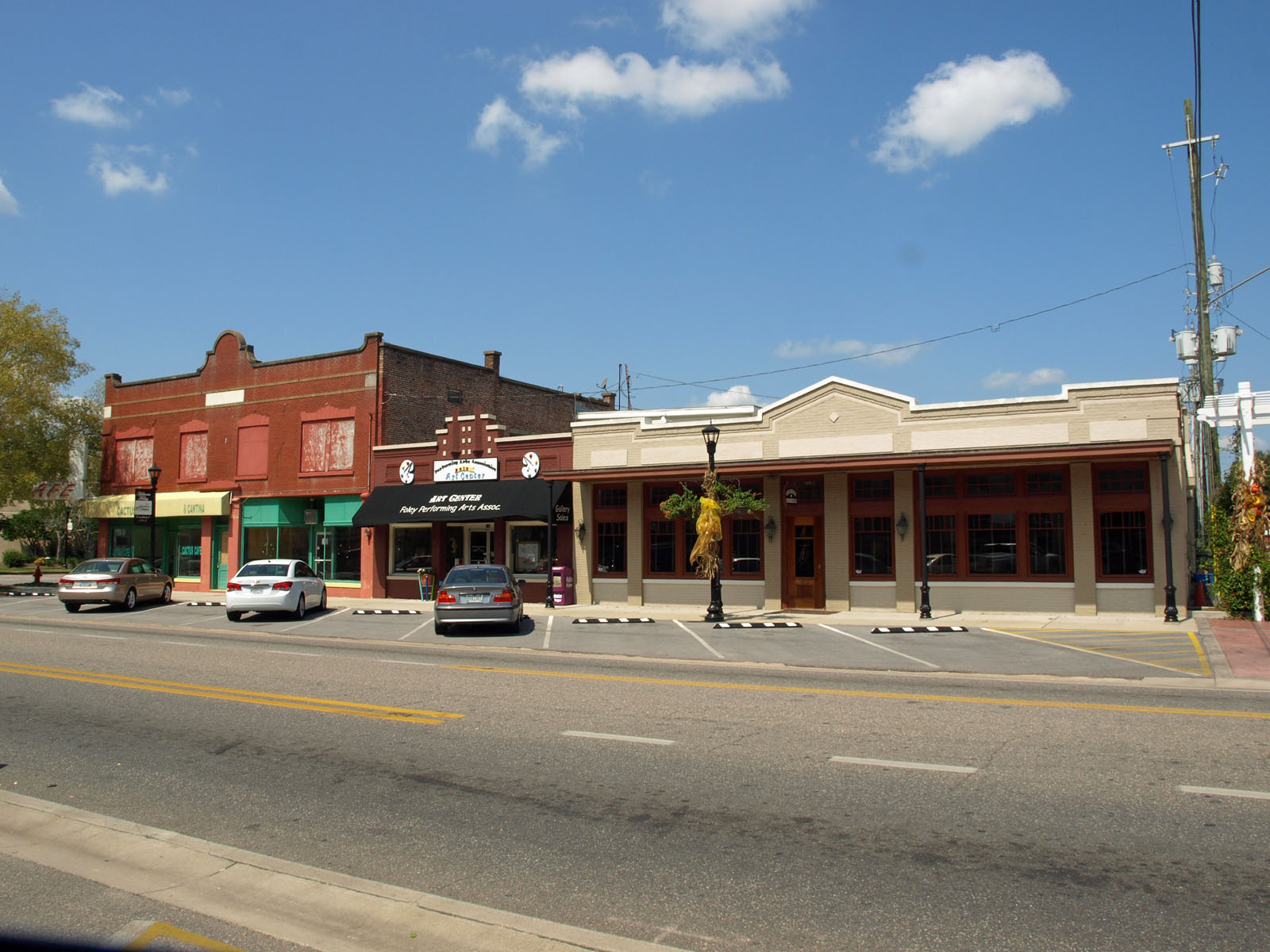
- 100s block of W. Laurel Ave, in 2012

- Location within Alabama
- Location: Parts of Alston, N & S McKenzie, AL 98, E & W Laurel, Myrtle, Rose, and W. Orange, Foley, Alabama
- Coordinates: 30.406667°N 87.683889°W
- Area: 230.6 acres (93.3 ha)
- Architect: Frank Lockwood; Warren, Knight & Davis et al.
- Architectural style: Colonial Revival, Tudor Revival, et al.
- NRHP reference No.: 04001496 (original); 100003122 (increase); 12000316 (decrease)

Significant dates
- Added to NRHP: January 19, 2005
- Boundary increase: September 20, 2019
- Boundary decrease: June 4, 2012

The Foley Downtown Historic District, in Foley, Alabama, United States, is a historic district that was listed on the National Register of Historic Places in 2005.

Its boundaries originally encompassed parts of Alston St., North and South McKenzie St., U.S. Route 98, East and West Laurel Ave., Myrtle Ave., Rose Ave., and West Orange Ave. until a boundary decrease on June 4, 2012. The boundary was extended in 2019.

== Buildings ==
The original listing included 29 contributing buildings and one contributing site on 230.6 acres (93.3 ha). It included:

- The Depot, the former railroad depot of Foley, which in 2003 was the Foley History Museum, at 125 East Laurel Avenue, (c. 1909; 1971; 1995). This is a one-story weatherboard Craftsman style depot building with a hipped and cross gable roof, decorative wood brackets, and a brick foundation. The building was moved to Magnolia Springs in 1971 but was then returned to its original site in Foley in 1995.
- A Masonic Temple building (c.1925), designed in Mission Revival style by George B. Rogers of Mobile, Alabama

Architects with one or more projects there include Frank Lockwood and Warren, Knight & Davis.

== Notes ==
- Architecture: Colonial Revival, Tudor Revival, et al.
- Historic function: Domestic; Commerce/trade; Government; Social; Religion; Industry/processing/extraction; Health Care
- Historic subfunction: Single Dwelling; Hotel; Specialty Store; Warehouse; Restaurant; City Hall; Meeting Hall
- Criteria: Event, Architecture/engineering
- Government: Government; Commerce/trade; Health Care; Recreation And Culture; Domestic; Landscape
- Subgovernment: Post Office; Specialty Store; Hospital; Auditorium; Park; Single Dwelling; Business
- Criteria: event, event, architecture/engineering, architecture/engineering
- Area: 19.4 acres
- Contributing buildings: 28
- Contributing sites: 1
