= Mobile Public Library =

Public library system primarily serving Mobile County, Alabama

Coordinates: 30.6867°N 88.0506°W

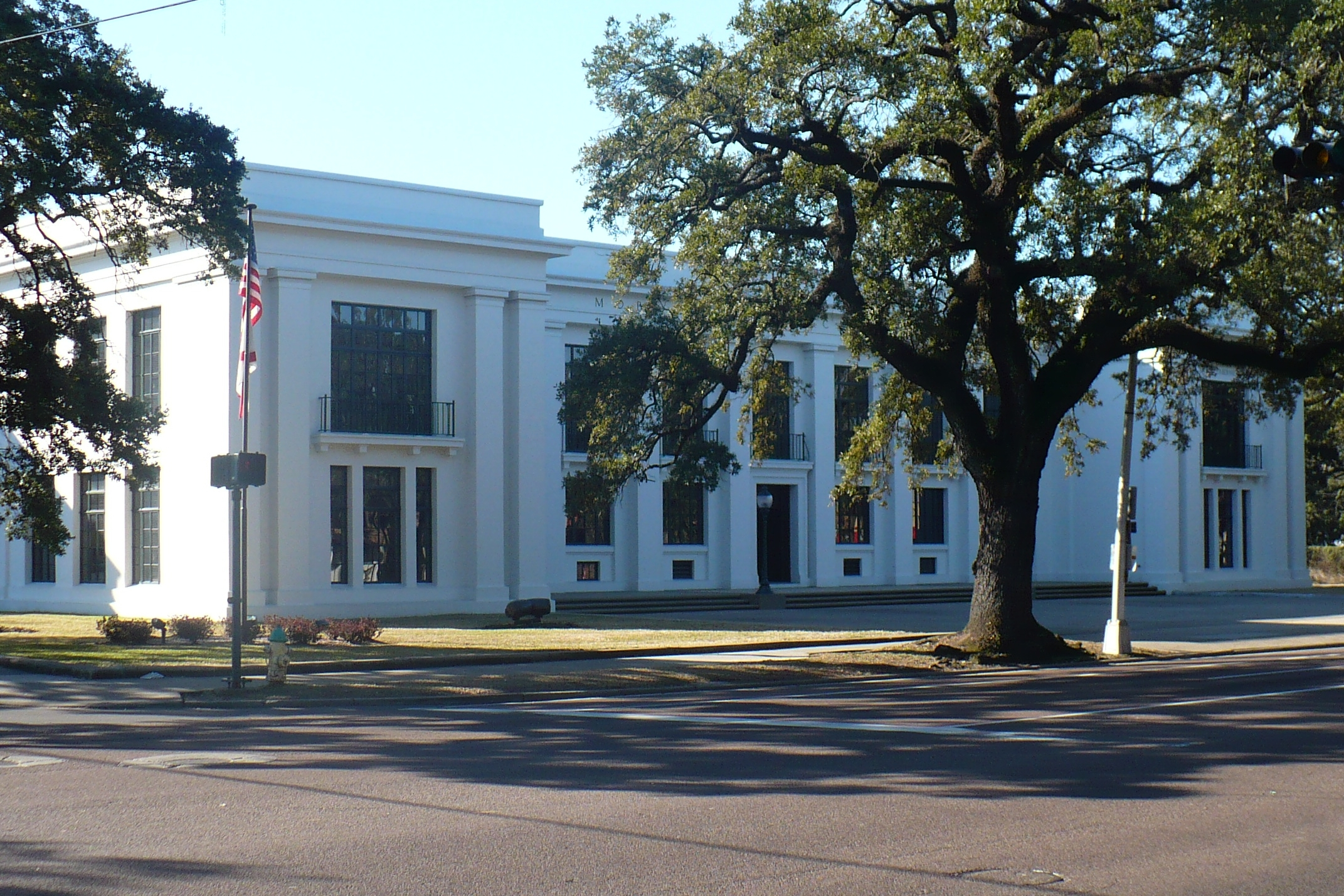
- The Ben May Main Library building in 2008.
- Location: Ben May Main Library; 701 Government Street; Mobile, Alabama, USA
- Established: 1902
- Branches: 10

Collection
- Size: 756,000

Access and use
- Circulation: 1,650,000
- Population served: 474,000

Other information
- Director: Jurée Hall
- Website: Mobile Public Library

The Mobile Public Library is a public library system primarily serving Mobile County, Alabama. The system is a department of the city of Mobile and receives funding from Mobile County and the city of Saraland.

== History ==
The Mobile Public Library has roots going back to the 1850s, when it was started as a subscription organization by the Franklin Society. The library was officially established as the Mobile Public Library in 1902 and was originally housed in an antebellum structure at the corner of Conti and Hamilton Street. The library association appealed to city leaders in the late 1910s to provide operating funds for the library, and it offered to give the city the library property if it would build a new building to house the collections. The city declined to finance the construction of a new building, but did approve operating funds on April 2, 1918.

Due to increasing public demand for a library, on December 15, 1925, the city commissioners voted to schedule a special election on a $250,000 bond issue. The voters approved the bond and, along with a gift of $30,000 from Eli H. Bernheim of New York City, the new library building was constructed. Noted Mobile architect George Bigelow Rogers designed the building in the Classical Revival style. The new structure, now known as the Ben May Main Library, was opened on September 15, 1928.

The state had passed racial segregation laws at the turn of the century after disenfranchising most blacks and many poor whites in the state, excluding them from politics. Mobile's African-American community did not have access to a public library until one was completed for them in 1931; it was known as the Davis Avenue Branch. It was also designed by George Bigelow Rogers. It was funded by a city bond issue and the city's sale of the old library property on Conti Street.

The Ben May Main Library building is a contributing building to the Church Street East Historic District, which was listed on the National Register of Historic Places on December 16, 1971. The system opened a new branch, the West Regional Branch, in 2002, with First Lady Laura Bush making an address. Beginning in 2006, the Ben May Main Library building was restored and expanded by 22,000 square feet (2,000 m^{2}). It was reopened on May 31, 2007.

== Services ==
In addition to basic services, participation in several interlibrary loan systems, and internet access at all locations, the Mobile Public Library provides a range of other services. Free library cards are made available to all residents in the Alabama counties of Mobile, Baldwin, Washington, Clarke, Monroe, Escambia and Conecuh. Alabama Virtual Library (AVL) cards are also made available for free at all branches.

=== References ===
Basic reference material and on-line tools are located at all library locations. Research materials on many subjects including business, laws and regulations, medicine, biographies, art and collectibles, colleges and careers, patents and trademarks, and travel are located at the Ben May Main Library. The system also offers telephone reference assistance, document delivery by fax, reference research appointments, and a variety of reference classes.

=== Local history and genealogy ===
The Local History and Genealogy Division includes works by local authors, Mobile histories, periodicals, Mobile newspapers on microfilm from 1819 to the present, city directories from 1837 onward, federal census records for most of the Southeastern United States, the Mobile Historic Development Commission's survey of historic architecture in Mobile with 10,000 images stored and indexed on CD-ROM, 10 cabinets of paper files and newspaper clippings on local subjects and the Memory Studio containing equipment used for media format conversions.

=== Youth services ===
This department attempts to meet the needs and interests of children and young adults through the various library collections, services and programs. Books, movie DVDs and VHS, music CDs, audiobooks, back issues of magazines, and video games are available to be checked out. Story time for young children is provided at most library locations.

=== Disabilities ===
All branches provide handicapped access, materials, and services for patrons with disabilities. A few of the services provided are magnifying glasses, large type books, closed captioned videos, books for and about the handicapped, and instructional books and videos on sign language. In addition, recorded books on discs and cassettes and the equipment for using them are available on free loan to eligible individuals from the Alabama Regional Library for the Blind and Physically Handicapped in Montgomery, Alabama.

=== Bookmobile ===
The library operates a bookmobile three days a week at over 30 different stops across Mobile County. Each location is visited every three weeks.

== Locations ==
The system consists of the Ben May Main Library, nine other locations and a Bookmobile.

- Ben May Main Library
  701 Government Street
  Mobile, Alabama
- Local History and Genealogy Library
  753 Government Street
  Mobile, Alabama
- West Regional Library
  5555 Grelot Road
  Mobile, Alabama
- Moorer/Spring Hill Branch
  4 McGregor Avenue South
  Mobile, Alabama
- Parkway Branch
  1924-B Dauphin Island Parkway
  Mobile, Alabama
- Theodore Oaks Branch
  5808 Highway 90 West
  Theodore, Alabama
- Virginia Dillard Smith/Toulminville Branch
  601 Stanton Road
  Mobile, Alabama
- Trinity Gardens Community Library
  2668 Berkley Avenue
  Mobile, Alabama
- Saraland Public Library
  111 Saraland Loop
  Saraland, Alabama
- Semmes Regional Library
  9150 Moffett Rd
  Semmes, Alabama
