= Magnolia Springs Historic District =

Historic district in the United States

- U.S. National Register of Historic Places
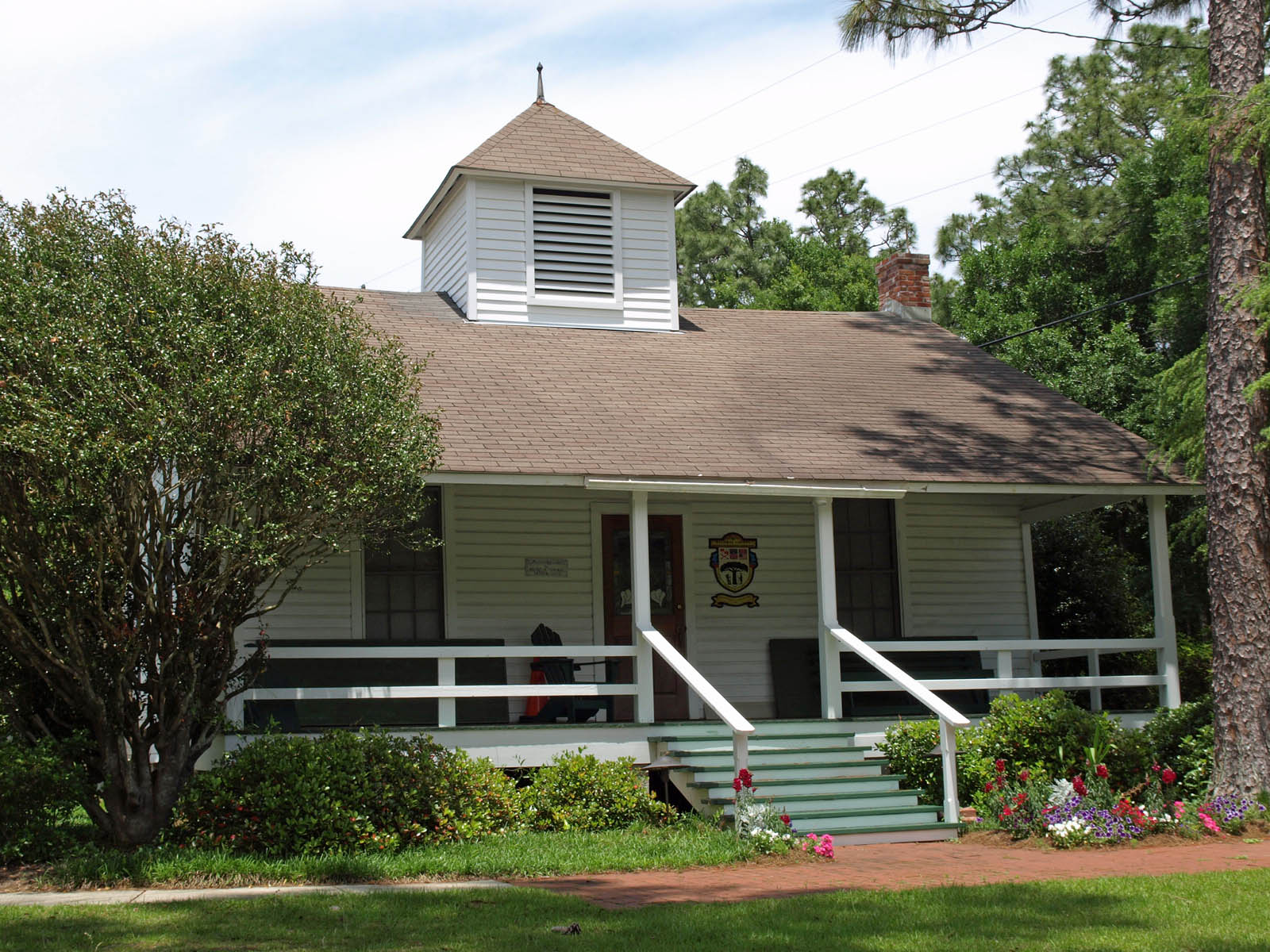
- Magnolia Springs Community Hall, in 2013

- Location within Alabama
- Location: Roughly along Oak, Spring, Bay, Jessamine, Magnolia, Pine & Rock Sts., Island, Cedar & Holly Aves. & Magnolia Spgs. Hyw., Magnolia Springs, Alabama
- Coordinates: 30.399642°N 87.7761°W
- Area: 163 acres (0.66 km^{2})
- Architectural style: Bungalow/craftsman
- NRHP reference No.: 11001046
- Added to NRHP: January 27, 2012

The Magnolia Springs Historic District, in Magnolia Springs, Alabama, United States, is a 163 acres (0.66 km^{2}) historic district which was listed on the National Register of Historic Places (NRHP) in 2012.

A previous district of the same name had existed as an entity of Baldwin County, but it was legally dissolved by the incorporation of Magnolia Springs.

The district runs roughly along Oak, Spring, Bay, Jessamine, Magnolia, Pine & Rock Sts., Island, Cedar & Holly Aves. & Magnolia Springs Highway. It includes 70 contributing buildings, a contributing structure, and a contributing site (the spring), as well as 47 non-contributing resources.

The district was deemed significant "for its role as a resort community that, in the late 19th and early to mid 20th centuries, served both transient visitors as well as part-time and permanent residents who were predominantly affluent Northerners."

Included are:

- Brunell House, 12113 Jessamine St., separately-NRHP-listed, a vernacular rental cottage with elements of Classical Revival style, including Tuscan columns.
- Governor's Club, separately-NRHP-listed
- Moore Brothers General Store (c.1925), 14770 Oak St., separately-NRHP-listed
- Magnolia Springs Community Hall (1896), Oak Street, across from the Moore Store
- St. Paul's Episcopal Church, Oak Ave, separately-NRHP-listed
- Sunnyside Hotel, 14469 Oak St., separately-NRHP-listed
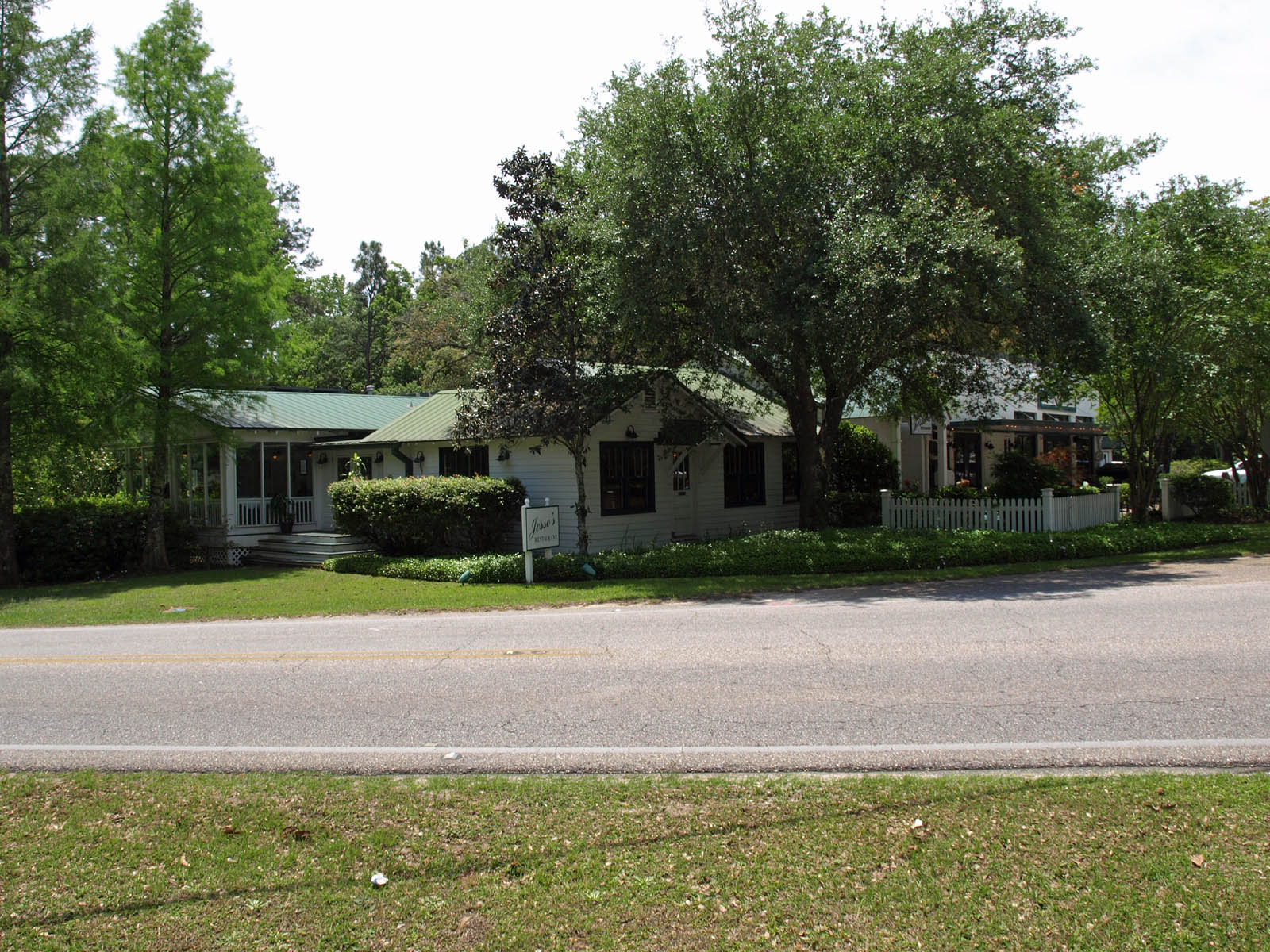
Moore Brothers General Store

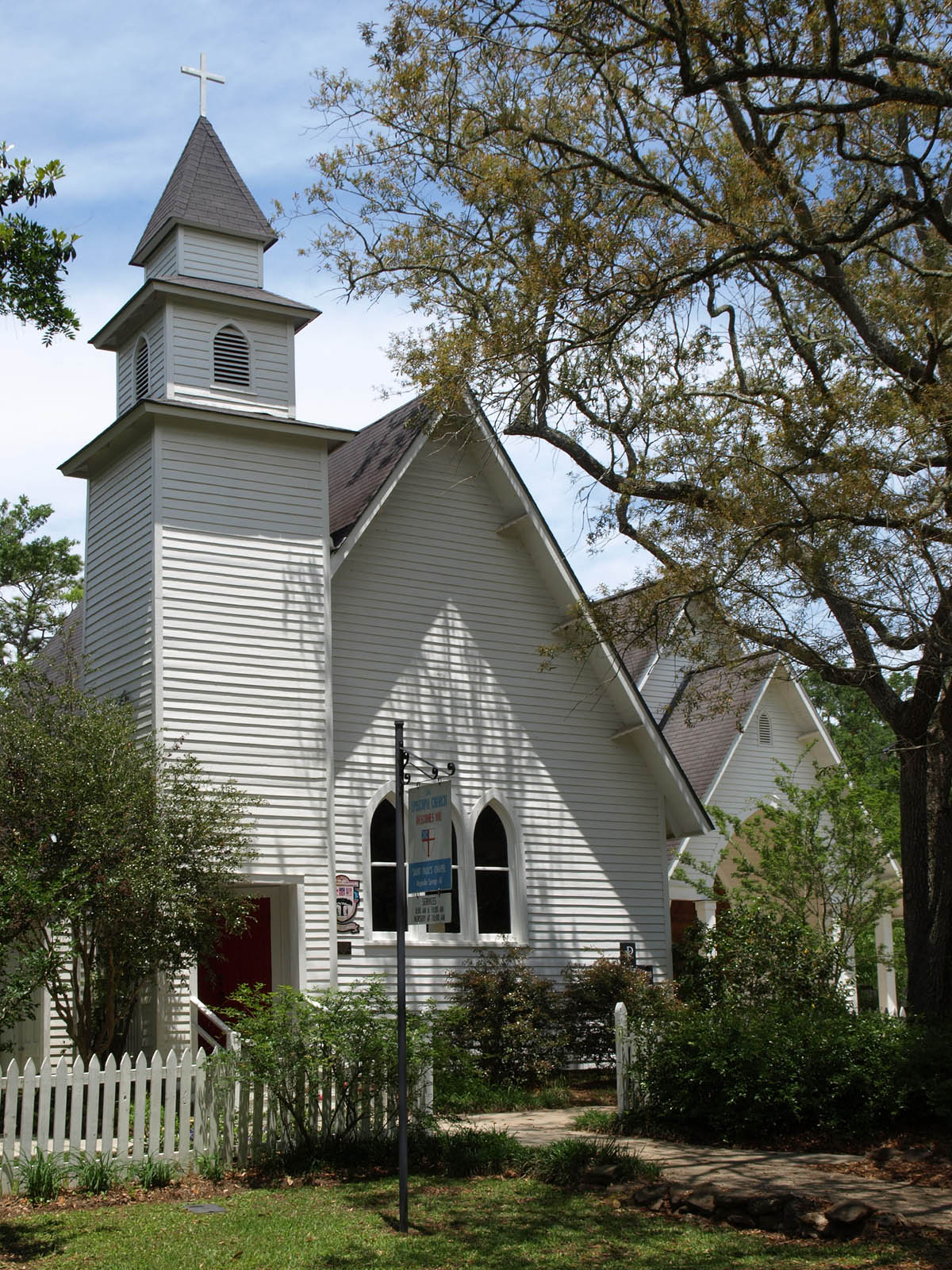
St. Paul's Episcopal

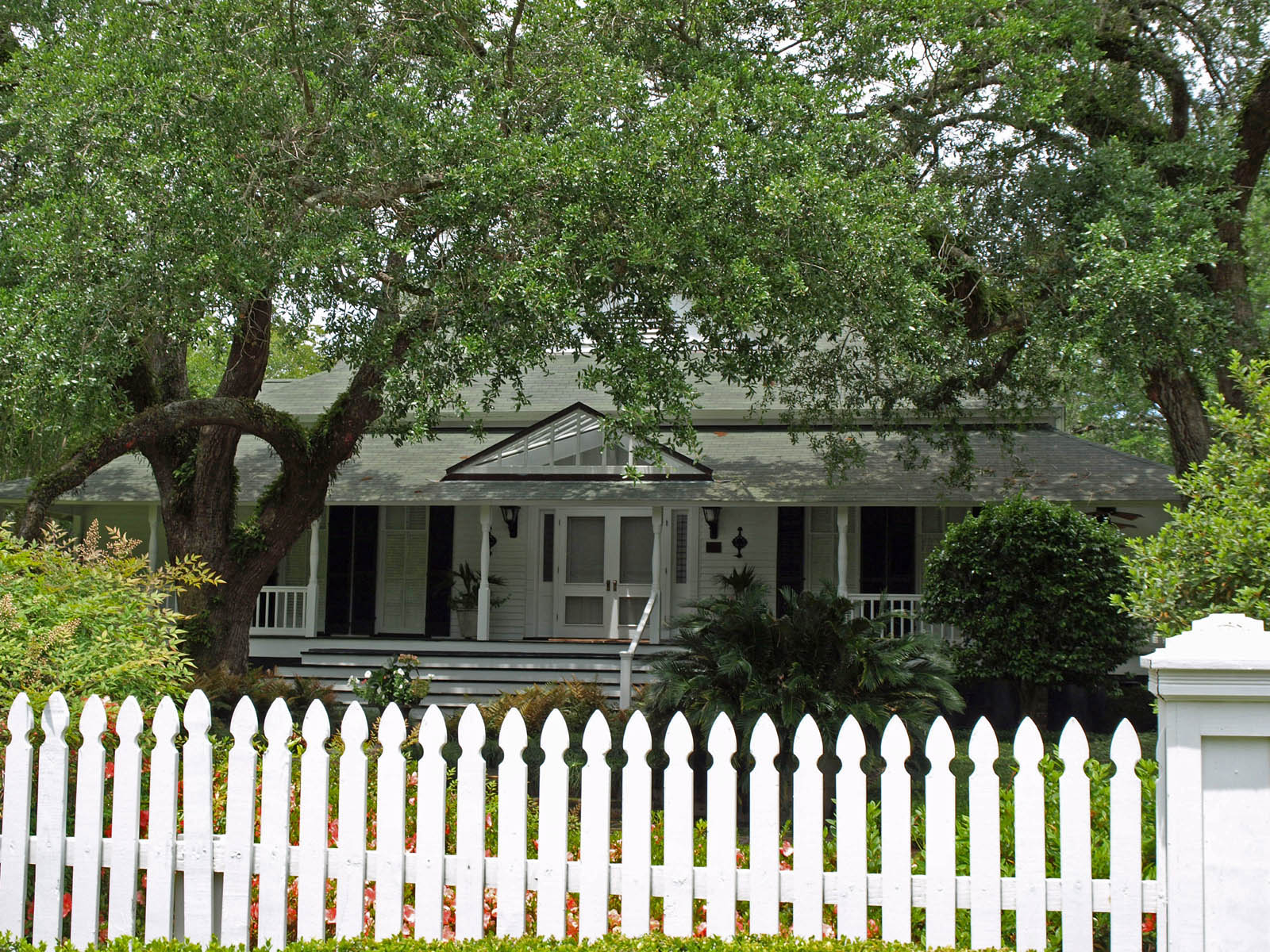
Governor's Club

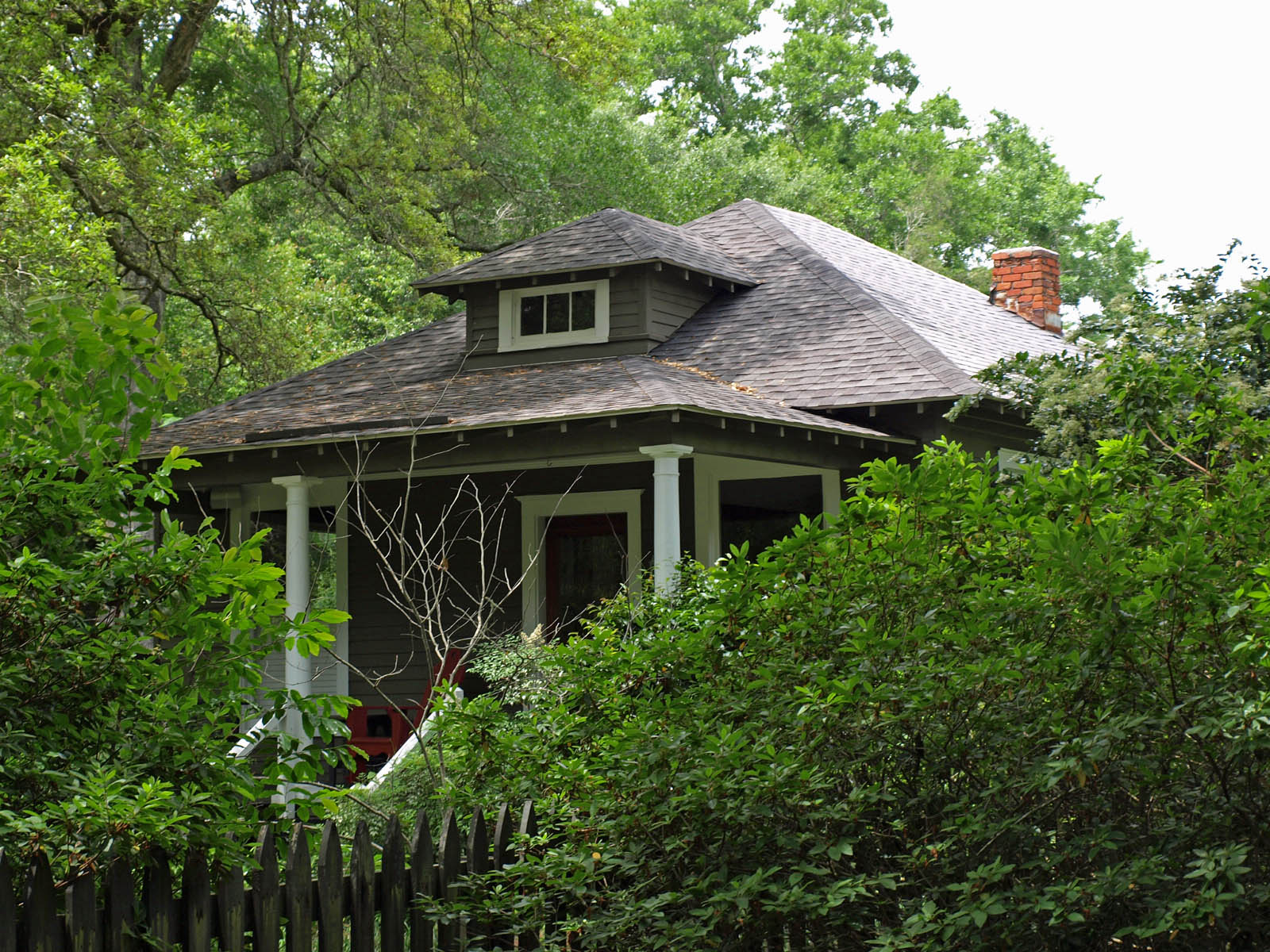
Brunell House

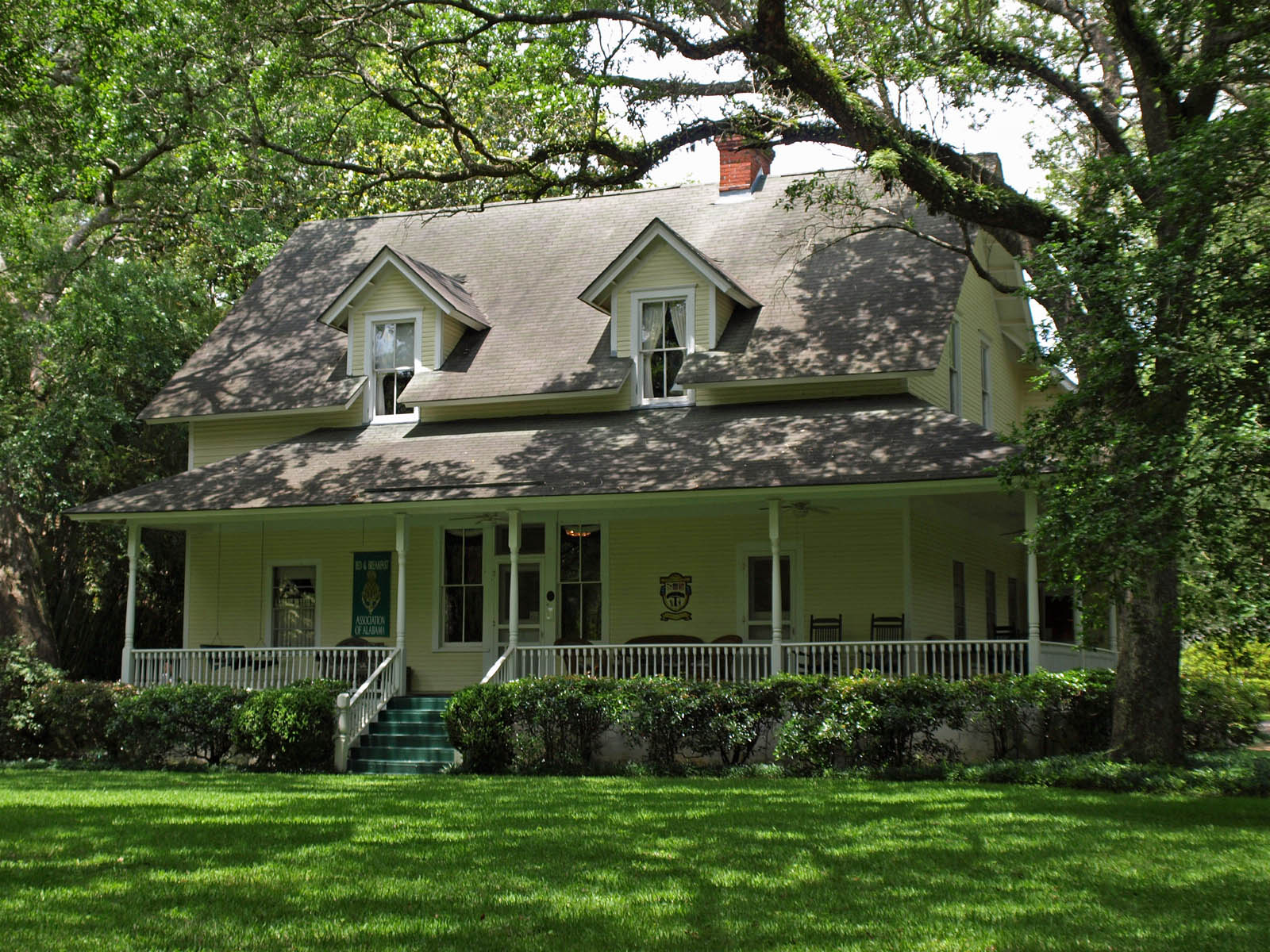
Sunnyside Hotel
