= Oakleigh Historic Complex (Mobile, Alabama) =

Historic house in Alabama, United States

- Oakleigh
- U.S. National Register of Historic Places
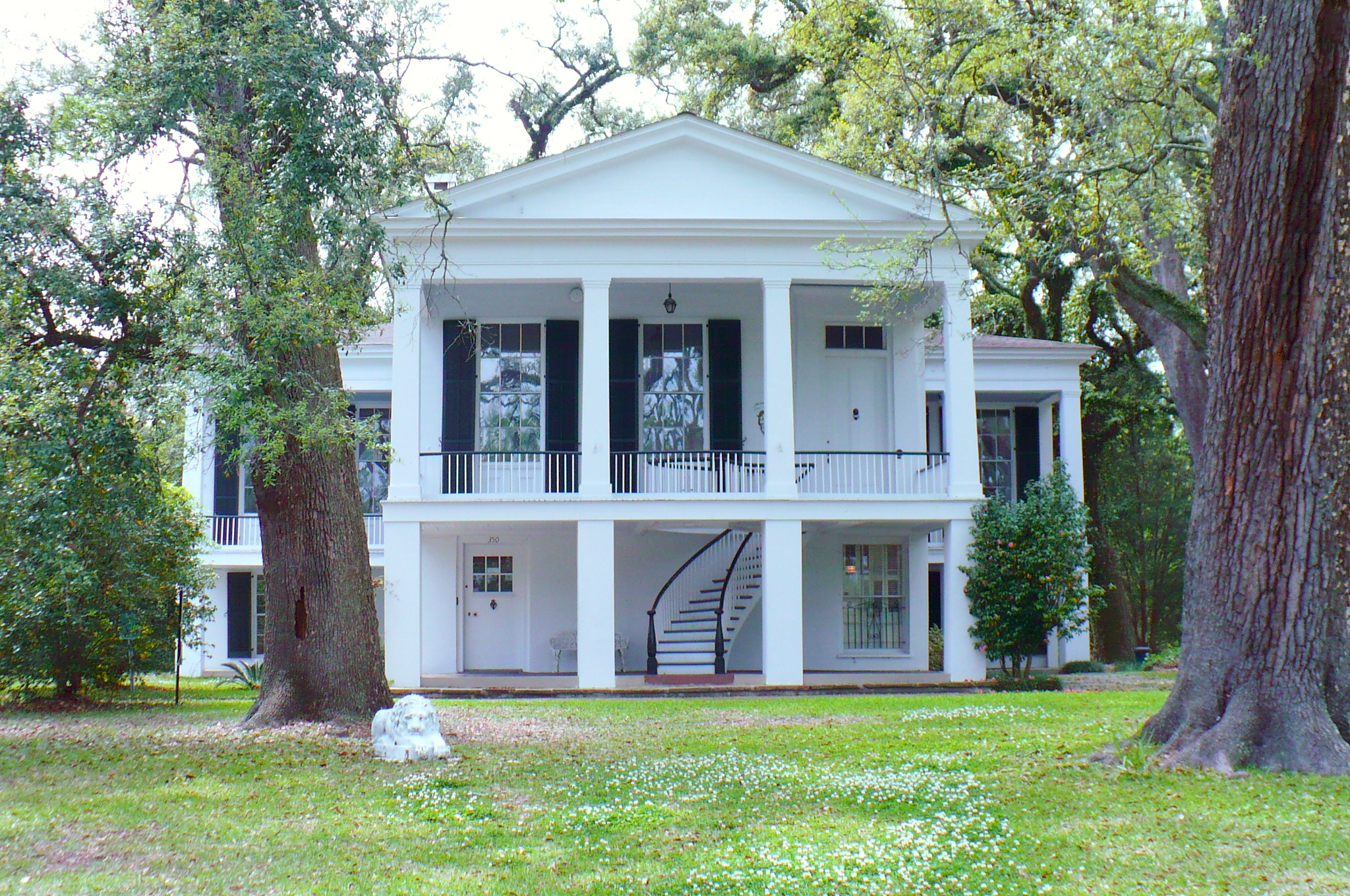
- Oakleigh, centerpiece of the Oakleigh Historic Complex

- Location within Mobile, Alabama Location within Alabama Location within the United States
- Location: 350 Oakleigh Place; Mobile, Alabama
- Coordinates: 30°40′51″N 88°03′38″W
- Area: 2 acres (0.81 ha)
- Built: 1833
- Architectural style: Greek Revival
- NRHP reference No.: 71000104
- Added to NRHP: May 27, 1971

Oakleigh is a c. 1833 historic house museum in Mobile, Alabama, United States. It is the centerpiece of the Oakleigh Historic Complex, a grouping of buildings that contain a working-class raised cottage, Union Barracks, and a modern archives building. The name for the estate comes from a combination of the word oak and the Anglo-Saxon word lea, which means meadow. The complex is within the Oakleigh Garden Historic District, the surrounding district and neighborhood being named after the estate.

== History ==
Oakleigh was built on 33 acres (130,000 m^{2}) of woodland west of Mobile in 1833 by James W. Roper, a brick mason from James City County, Virginia who was also a dry goods merchant and cotton factor. He chose this site for his house because of its valuable clay pit. He operated a Water Street brickyard in downtown Mobile on the present-day site of the RSA Battle House Tower.

While building Oakleigh, Roper lost his first wife, Sarah Ann Davenport, and a child. He remarried in 1838 upon completion of Oakleigh, and had four children with his second wife, Eliza Ann Simison.

The Panic of 1837 hit Roper and his business interests hard. After borrowing $20,000 to build the home, he was unable to pay back his loans, and the bank repossessed the home. With his business interests failing, Roper and his family then left Mobile, and became a lumber merchant in New Orleans, Louisiana in 1840. The bank would then sell off 24 acres of the land and rent out the home.

Alfred Irwin, treasurer of the Mobile & Ohio Railroad, purchased the house in 1852. During the Civil War his wife, Margaret Kilshaw Irwin, defended the home against Union soldiers by proclaiming the property neutral territory on account of her British citizenship and hanging the Union Jack from the balcony. T.K. and Lee Fearn Irwin, their sons, were both veterans of the Civil War and gained local prominence in the late 19th century. Lee served as Mobile's assistant postmaster, president of the Cherokee Cotton Mills, and manager of the Mobile Oil Mills. His older brother T.K., once aide to Confederate president Jefferson Davis, went on to establish the Mobile Cotton Exchange and later became its president. T.K. married Mary Anna Ketchum. Much of their correspondence from the Civil War years and after remains on file at Oakleigh today. Oakleigh remained in the Irwin family until sold by Daisy Irwin Clisby, granddaughter of Alfred, in 1916.

== Architecture ==
Built as a raised, galleried villa in the Greek Revival style, Oakleigh is one of the largest T-shaped homes in the state of Alabama. The unique shape of the home allows for cross-ventilation in Mobile's humid subtropical climate. The lower floor was originally a raised basement, likely built of handmade brick from the site, once functioned as a workspace and storage. The home's second floor contains the main living quarters. The quarter-turn, cantilever staircase rising to the front door was designed by James Roper.

== The complex ==
The Oakleigh Historic Complex also consists of the Union Barracks, the Cox-Deasy Cottage, and the Minnie Mitchell Archives. Visitors are able to view the complex via personally guided tours from Oakleigh Belles and/or docents.

- The Union Barracks, built in 1867, used to be known as the Cook's House. It has been restored to tell the story of post-Emancipation life in Mobile. It is one of the few surviving structures built during Reconstruction after the Civil War.
- The Cox-Deasy Cottage, built in 1850, is a Creole raised cottage now serving as a program space for the Historic Mobile Preservation Society.
- Minnie Mitchell Archives houses the archives of the Historic Mobile Preservation Society. The archives house historic maps, surname files, Mardi Gras related files, newspapers and newspaper clippings, scrapbooks, and numerous special collections.
