= Governor's Club =

Historic clubhouse in Alabama, United States

- U.S. National Register of Historic Places
- U.S. Historic district – Contributing property
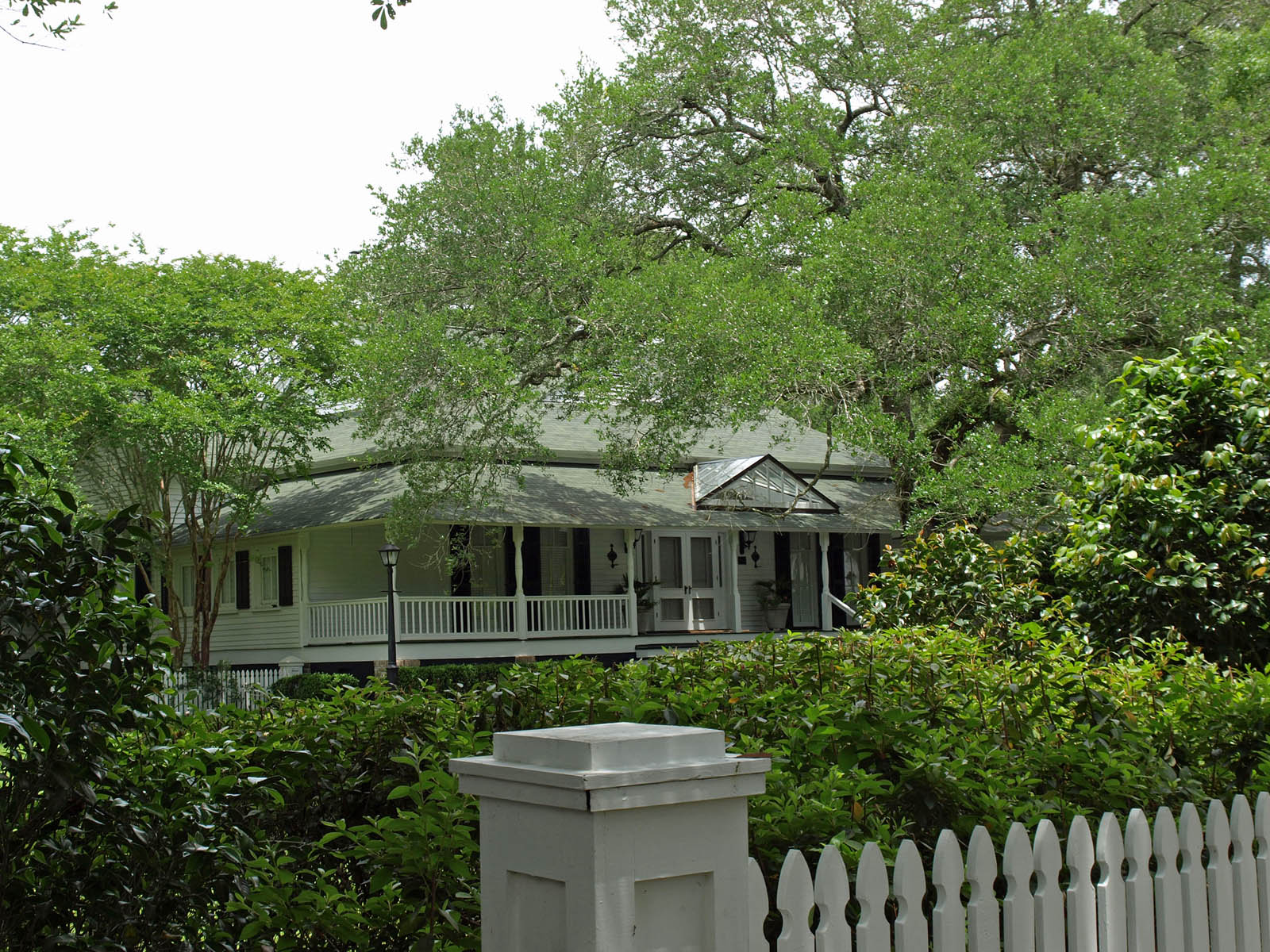
- The Governor's Club in May 2013

- Location within Alabama Location within the United States
- Location: 11866 Magnolia St., Magnolia Springs, Alabama
- Coordinates: 30°23′46″N 87°46′34″W
- Area: less than one acre
- Built: 1901-1908
- Architectural style: Coastal Cottage
- Part of: Magnolia Springs Historic District (ID11001046)
- NRHP reference No.: 00001031

Significant dates
- Added to NRHP: August 31, 2000
- Designated CP: January 27, 2012

The Governor's Club, located at 11866 Magnolia St. in Magnolia Springs, Alabama, United States, was listed on the National Register of Historic Places in 2000. It is of "Coastal Cottage" architecture.

It stands on property assembled by Chicago businessman Frank Brunell during 1901 to 1908. It has also sometimes been known as "Brunell House," but there is a different house of that name, also NRHP-listed, also in Magnolia Springs, on Jessamine St.

In 2015, the house was valued at $4.79 million.

Along with Sunnyside Hotel, Governor's Club is one of two resort hotels from the 1920s era of resorts and vacations in the area. "With its spacious wrap-around porch enhanced by turned posts and balusters, floor to ceiling windows, and great interior details, the Governor’s Club stands as an important architectural survivor of Baldwin County’s early 20th century resort years."

It is also included in the Magnolia Springs Historic District, as a contributing building.
