= Scottish Rite Temple (Mobile, Alabama) =

- U.S. National Register of Historic Places
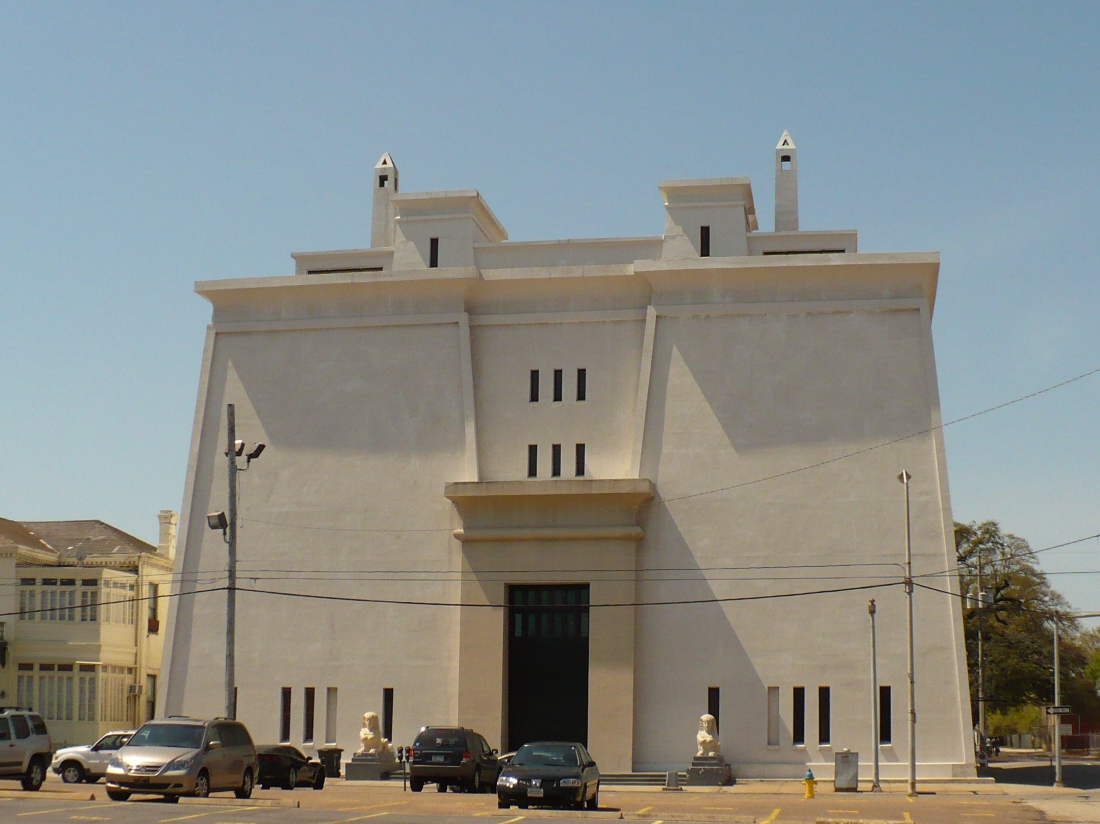
- Scottish Rite Temple from the corner of N. Claiborne and St. Francis Streets.

- Location within Mobile, Alabama Location within Alabama Location within the United States
- Location: 351 St. Francis Street; Mobile, Alabama
- Coordinates: 30°41′29″N 88°2′47″W
- Built: 1921–22
- Architect: George B. Rogers
- Architectural style: Egyptian Revival
- NRHP reference No.: 84000694
- Added to NRHP: January 5, 1984

Scottish Rite Temple, also known as The Temple Downtown, is a historic former masonic building in Mobile, Alabama, United States. It was built to serve as the meeting place for the Ancient and Accepted Scottish Rite of Freemasonry. The building was designed by George Bigelow Rogers, a local Mobile architect who was responsible for designing many of the city's buildings during this period. The cornerstone was laid on November 30, 1921, with the building completed in 1922. It is the only intact example of the Egyptian Revival style in Mobile. It was placed on the National Register of Historic Places on January 5, 1984. It was sold in 1996 to a private citizen and reopened as a banqueting venue.

== Architecture ==
The Scottish Rite Temple was inspired by Ancient Egyptian architectural forms, although combined in a unique way. The building facades on the east and north sides are in the form of Egyptian pylons. An ancient Egyptian pylon was made up of two battered (tapered) monumental towers, each topped by a cornice, and joined together by a less elevated section containing a central gateway leading into a temple. A battered wall is wider at the base than it is at the top, with an upwardly receding slope. The south facade of the Scottish Rite Temple abuts the adjacent property. It and the rear facade are plain masonry and are not battered. The two entrance doorways, on the elaborate east and north facades, were inspired by the Bab el’Adb Gate, also known as the Gateway of Ptolemy III and Ptolemy IV, at the Karnak Temple Complex. The east entrance is flanked by a pair of sphinxes by the sculptor Allen W. Barr. The roof is surmounted by two protruding obelisks that originally functioned as chimneys.
