= Sunnyside Hotel =

Historic house in Alabama, United States

- U.S. National Register of Historic Places
- U.S. Historic district – Contributing property
- Alabama Register of Landmarks and Heritage
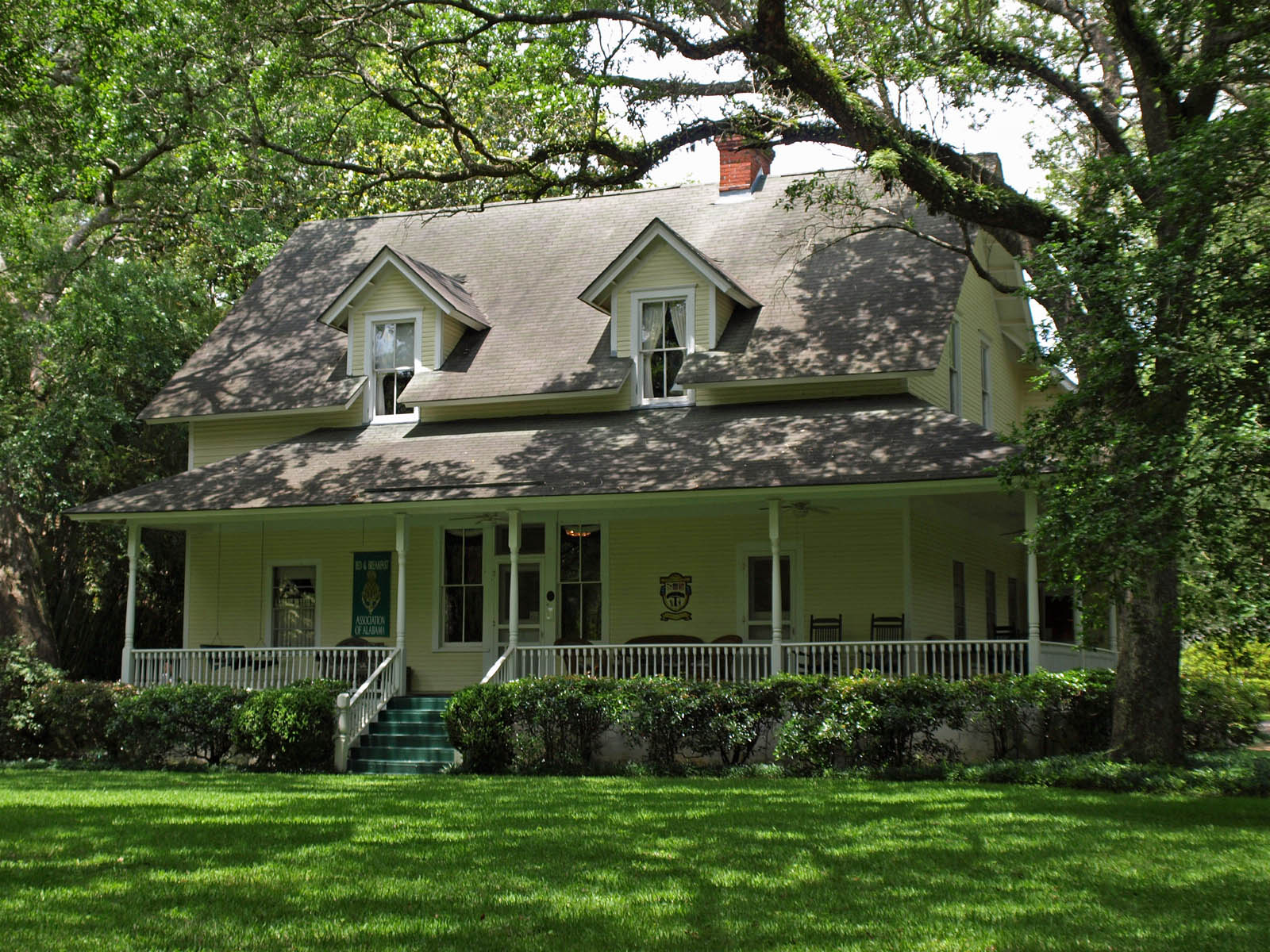
- Sunnyside Hotel in 2013

- Location within Alabama Location within the United States
- Location: 14469 Oak Street, Magnolia Springs, Alabama
- Coordinates: 30°23′59″N 87°46′36″W
- Area: less than one acre
- Built: 1897
- Architectural style: Late Victorian
- Part of: Magnolia Springs Historic District (ID11001046)
- NRHP reference No.: 98000111

Significant dates
- Added to NRHP: February 20, 1998
- Designated CP: January 27, 2012
- Designated ARLH: May 11, 1983

The Sunnyside Hotel is a historic house in Magnolia Springs, Alabama, U.S.. It was built in 1897 for Christopher McLennan. It was converted into a hotel by the new owner, Mrs William Harding, in 1913. In the 1940s, it was inherited by her sister and brother-in-law, who used it as a private home until the 1980s, when they sold it to new owners. In 1996, it was sold to David Worthington. It has been listed on the National Register of Historic Places since February 20, 1998.

It is also included in the Magnolia Springs Historic District, as a contributing building.
