= George Bigelow Rogers =

American architect

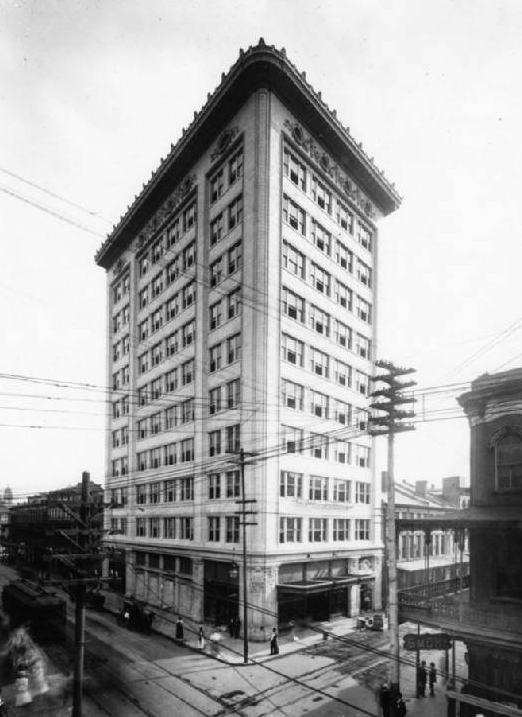
- Van Antwerp Building, taken shortly after completion
- Born: 1870; Illinois
- Died: 1945; Mobile, Alabama
- Occupation: Architect
- Buildings: Van Antwerp Building; Scottish Rite Temple; Mobile Public Library

George Bigelow Rogers (1870–1945) was an American architect, best known for the wide variety of buildings that he designed in Mobile, Alabama, including mansions in historic European styles and other private residences, churches and public buildings, and the first 11-story skyscraper in Mobile and the Southeast United States. Many of his structures have been listed on the National Register of Historic Places.

== Biography ==
Rogers was born in Illinois in 1870. After attending local schools there, he studied painting in France. He apprenticed as an architect from 1894 to 1898 at a firm in Hartford, Connecticut. While en route to a vacation in Mexico in 1901, he stopped in Mobile.

Rogers was quite taken with the city and decided to settle there. He went on to design many of what today are among its best known buildings. He was made a Fellow of the American Institute of Architects in 1941, an honor bestowed on fewer than two percent of all registered architects in the United States.

Rogers died in Mobile in 1945.

His architectural library is housed in the archives of the Historic Mobile Preservation Society.

== Projects in Mobile, Alabama ==
- George Fearn House (1904), listed on the National Register of Historic Places
- Van Antwerp Building (1907), on the National Register of Historic Places
- Burgess-Maschmeyer Mansion (1907) at 1209 Government Street
- Tacon-Bellingrath House (1908) at 60 South Ann Street (Destroyed)
- Dave Patton House (1915), on the National Register of Historic Places
- Albert Bush House (1915) at 1203 Government Street
- Government Street Methodist Church (1904–1917) at 901 Government Street
- Scottish Rite Temple (1921), on the National Register of Historic Places
- Shannon T. Hunter House (1923)
- Murphy High School Complex (1926), on the National Register of Historic Places
- Bellingrath Gardens and Home (1927), on the National Register of Historic Places
- Mobile Public Library (1928), on the National Register of Historic Places
- Thomas Byrne Memorial Library (1930), Spring Hill College
- Davis Avenue Branch of the Mobile Public Library in Mobile, Alabama (1931); now operating as the National African American Archives and Museum, it is listed on the National Register of Historic Places
- Leo Brown House at 1668 Government Street (1937)

== Other projects ==
- Masonic Temple (Foley, Alabama) (c.1925), Mission Revival in style, included in Foley Downtown Historic District

== See also ==
- National Register of Historic Places listings in Alabama
- National Register of Historic Places listings in Mobile, Alabama
