= Dave Patton House =

Historic house in Alabama, United States

- U.S. National Register of Historic Places
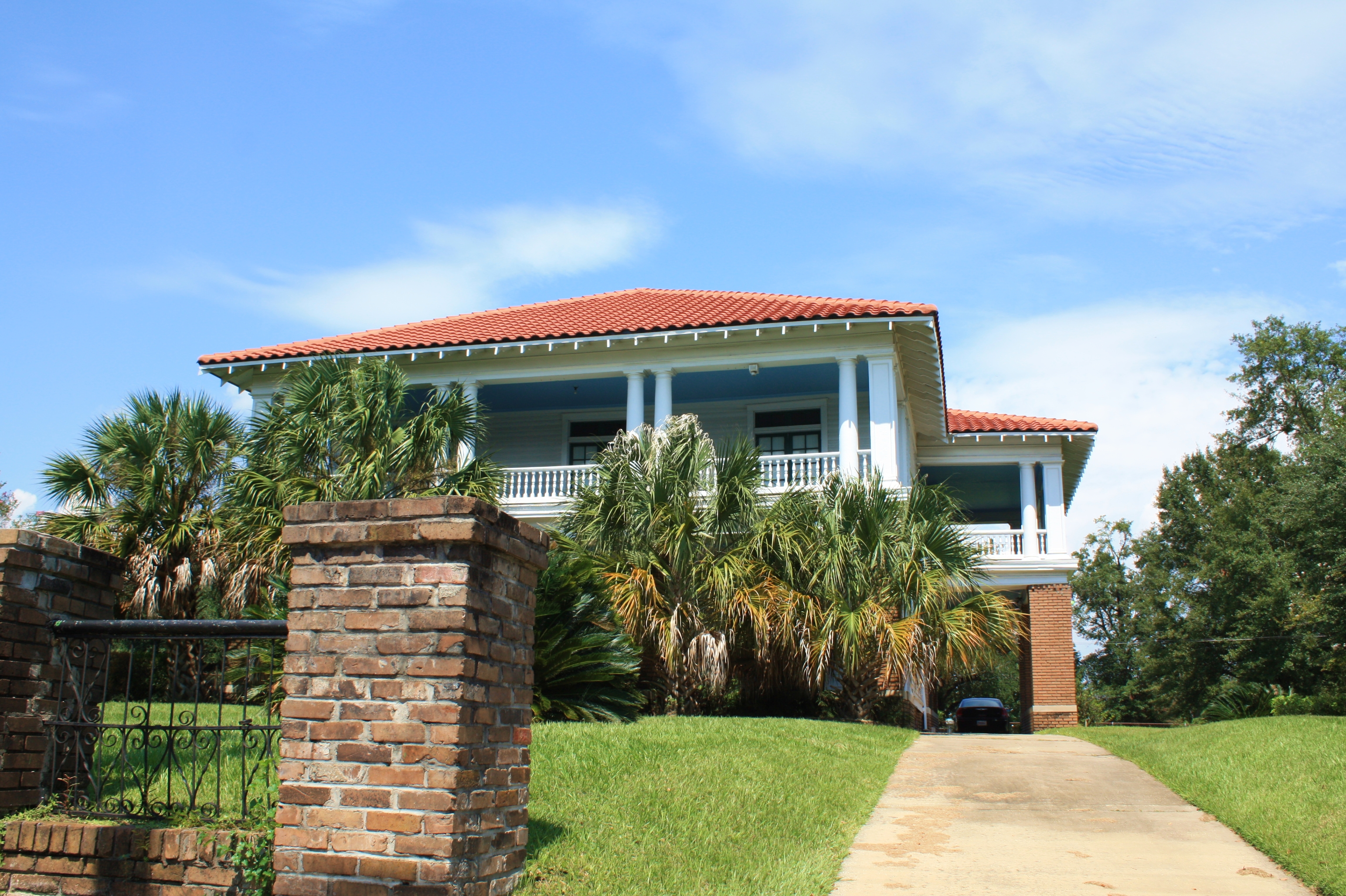

- Location within Mobile, Alabama Location within Alabama Location within the United States
- Location: 1252 Martin Luther King, Jr. Avenue; Mobile, Alabama
- Coordinates: 30°41′59″N 88°3′48″W
- Area: less than one acre
- Built: 1915
- NRHP reference No.: 87000937
- Added to NRHP: June 12, 1987

The Dave Patton House is a historic house in Mobile, Alabama, United States. The two-story structure was built for Dave Patton, a local African American entrepreneur. He purchased this property in 1900 and completed the Mediterranean Revival style house, designed by local architect George Bigelow Rogers, in 1915.

Dave Patton was born in 1879 and began his career using two mules to haul merchandise for local merchants. He gradually built up his own business, becoming a prominent real estate entrepreneur and contractor. He is known to have built many of the area's roads and schools. Patton died in 1927. The property eventually passed into the ownership of the Stewart Memorial C.M.E. Church and today serves as the parsonage for that church. The house is included on the African American Heritage Trail of Mobile and was added to the National Register of Historic Places on June 12, 1987.
