= Brunell House (Jessamine St., Magnolia Springs, Alabama) =

- U.S. National Register of Historic Places
- U.S. Historic district – Contributing property
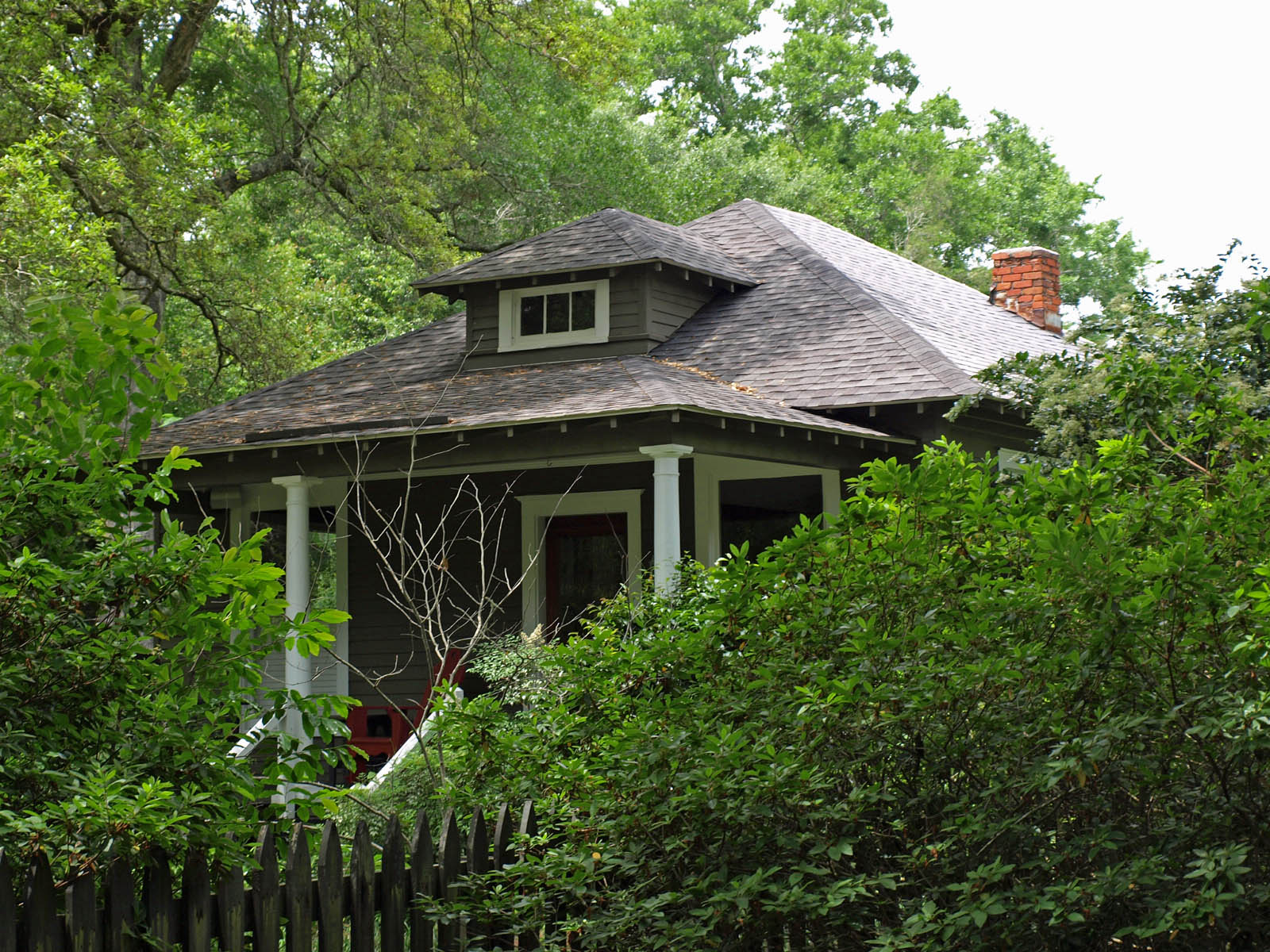

- Location within Alabama
- Location: 12113 Jessamine St., Magnolia Springs, Alabama
- Coordinates: 30.40094°N 87.77683°W
- Area: less than one acre
- Built: 1910
- Architectural style: Classical Revival
- Part of: Magnolia Springs Historic District (ID11001046)
- NRHP reference No.: 95001019

Significant dates
- Added to NRHP: August 22, 1995
- Designated CP: January 27, 2012

The Brunell House at 12113 Jessamine St. in Magnolia Springs, Alabama, United States, is a house that was built in 1910. It was listed on the National Register of Historic Places in 1995.

== Architecture ==
It is a vernacular cottage with elements of Classical Revival style, including Tuscan columns. It was built probably as a rental cottage for Mr. Brunell.

Another NRHP-listed property in Magnolia Springs is also sometimes known as "Brunell House". This is the Governor's Club, a resort hotel which stands on property assembled by Chicago businessman Frank Brunell during 1901 to 1908.

Brunell House is a contributing building in the Magnolia Springs Historic District, which was listed on the National Register in 2012.
