= Burgess-Maschmeyer Mansion =

Coordinates: 30°40′57.1″N 88°03′49.4″W

- U.S. Historic district – Contributing property
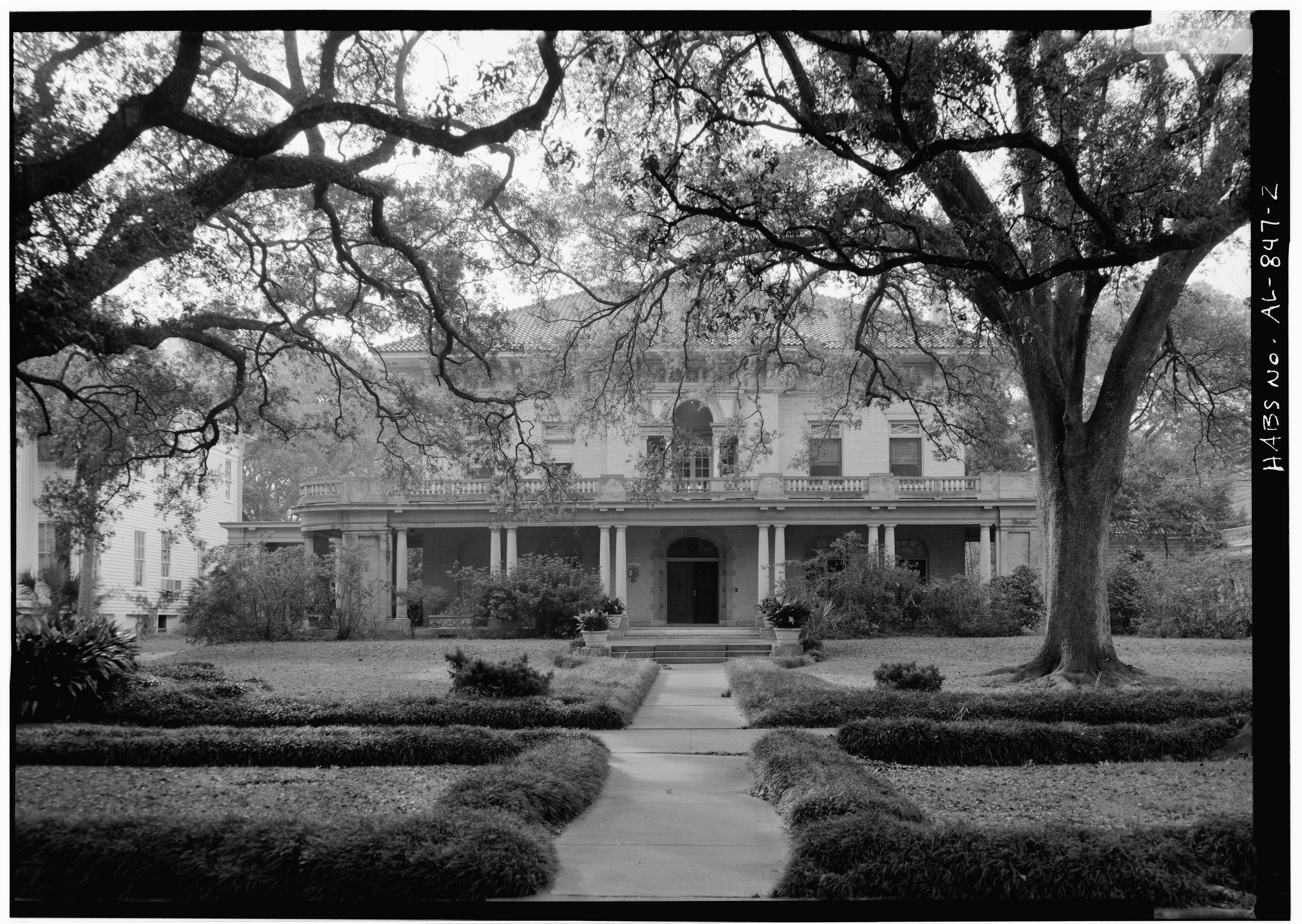
- General view of North (front) Elevation

- Location within Alabama Location within the United States
- Location: Mobile, Alabama
- Built: 1907
- Architect: George Bigelow Rogers
- Architectural style: Renaissance Revival
- Part of: Oakleigh Garden Historic District (ID7200171)
- Designated CP: April 13, 1972

The Burgess-Maschmeyer Mansion is a historic residence at 1209 Government Street in the Oakleigh Garden Historic District of Mobile, United States. It was built in 1907 in the Renaissance Revival style by noted Mobile architect George Bigelow Rogers. The residence was constructed for cotton factor Col. David R. Burgess.

After his death in 1917, it was inherited by his daughter Ethel Burgess Maschmeyer. She bequeathed it to the Mobile Jaycees, for use as their headquarters after her death in 1973. It subsequently was transferred to the University of Mobile to be used as its President's home. In 2000 the mansion was reverted to use as a private residence. It is listed as a historically significant building by the Mobile Historic Development Commission.
