= St. Paul's Episcopal Church (Magnolia Springs, Alabama) =

Historic church in Alabama, United States

- U.S. National Register of Historic Places
- U.S. Historic district – Contributing property
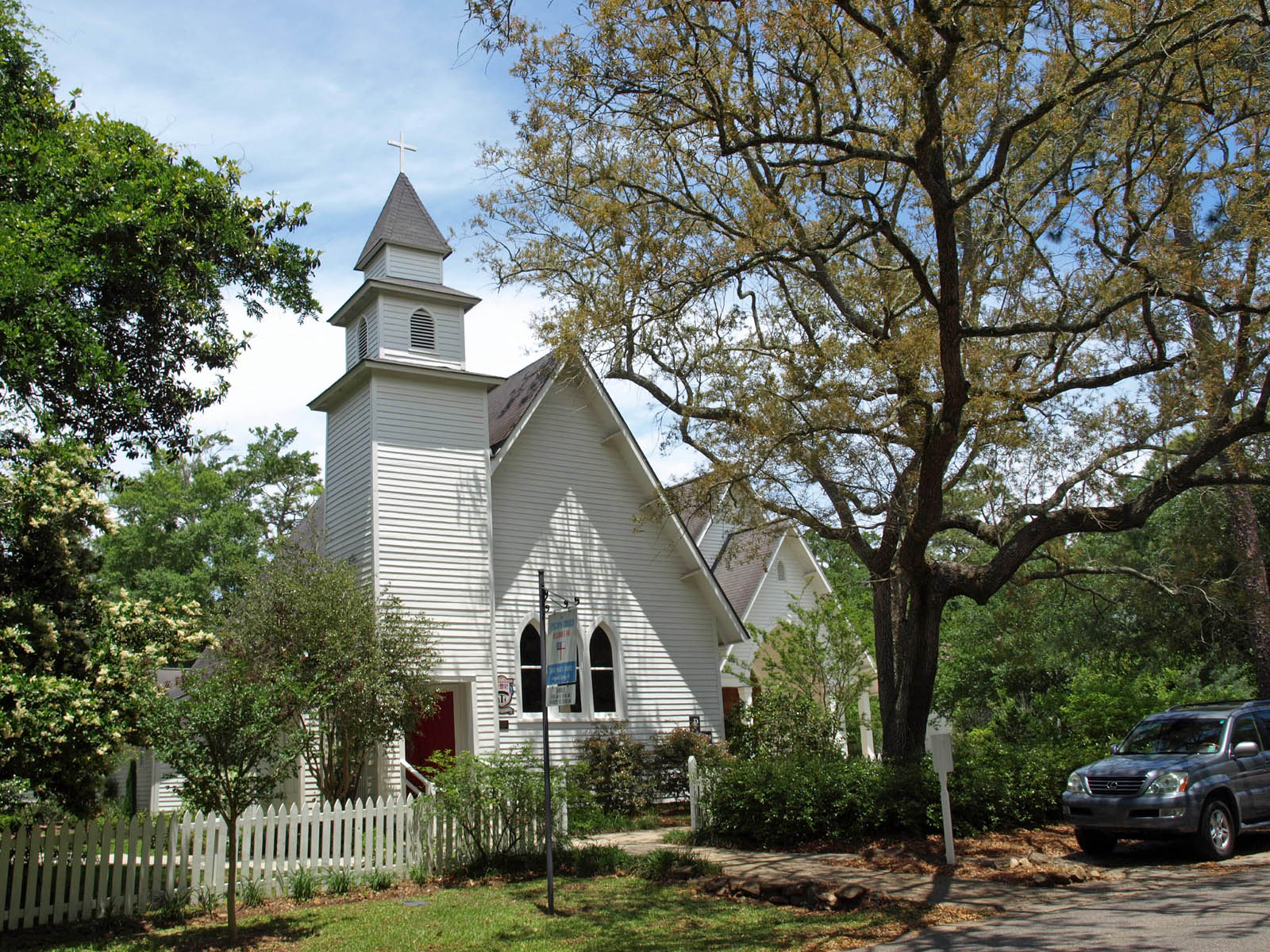
- The church in May 2013

- Location within Alabama Location within the United States
- Location: N side Oak Ave., Magnolia Springs, Alabama
- Coordinates: 30°24′5″N 87°46′17″W
- Built: 1901
- Architectural style: Late Gothic Revival
- Part of: Magnolia Springs Historic District (ID11001046)
- MPS: Rural Churches of Baldwin County TR
- NRHP reference No.: 88001355

Significant dates
- Added to NRHP: August 25, 1988
- Designated CP: January 27, 2012

St. Paul's Episcopal Church, also known as St. Paul's Episcopal Chapel, is an historic Carpenter Gothic church located at 14755 Oak Avenue, in Magnolia Springs, Alabama, United States. On September 25, 1988, it was added to the National Register of Historic Places.

Land was donated for the church in the 1890s after devout residents held services in their homes and invited preachers from nearby towns. However, the construction lagged due to insufficient funds before construction began in 1901 and the church was consecrated by Bishop Robert Woodward Barnwell in 1902. The church was nearly destroyed by a hurricane in 1916 and was the only church in Magnolia Springs for nearly fifty years.

It is also included in the Magnolia Springs Historic District, as a contributing building.

== See also ==
- List of Registered Historic Places in Baldwin County, Alabama
