= Oakleigh Garden Historic District =

Historic district in Alabama, United States

- U.S. National Register of Historic Places
- U.S. Historic district
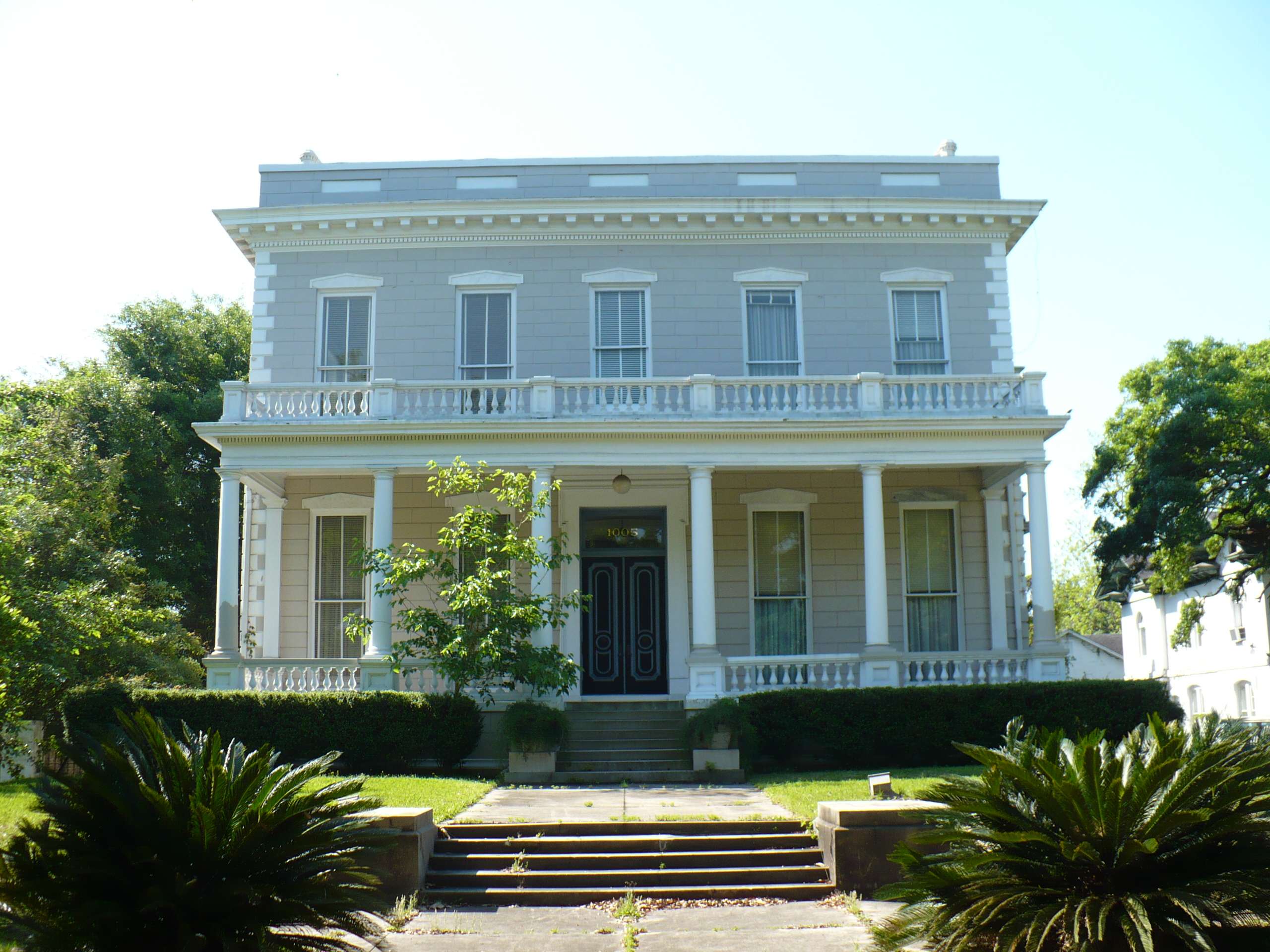
- 1005 Government Street

- Location within Mobile, Alabama Location within Alabama Location within the United States
- Location: Roughly bounded by Government, Marine, Texas, and Ann Sts. (original), Roughly bounded by Selma St., Broad St., Texas St. and Rapier Ave. (increase), Mobile, Alabama
- Coordinates: 30°40′56.33″N 88°3′24.07″W
- Area: 111.3 acres (45.0 ha); 34 acres (14 ha) (Increase)
- Architectural style: Federal, Greek Revival, Classical Revival, Bungalow/Craftsman, Late Victorian
- NRHP reference No.: 72000171 (original); 90002175 (increase); 16000863 (decrease)

Significant dates
- Added to NRHP: 13 April 1972
- Boundary increase: January 30, 1991
- Boundary decrease: December 20, 2016

The Oakleigh Garden Historic District is a historic district in Mobile, Alabama, United States. It was placed on the National Register of Historic Places on April 13, 1972. It is centered on Washington Square and was originally bounded by Government, Marine, Texas, and Ann Streets. A boundary increase on January 30, 1991, increased the boundaries to Rapier Avenue, Selma, Broad, and Texas Streets. The district covers 1,453 acres (5.88 km^{2}) and contains 288 contributing buildings. The buildings range in age from the 1820s to the 1940s with most in a variety of 19th-century architectural styles.

== Gallery ==
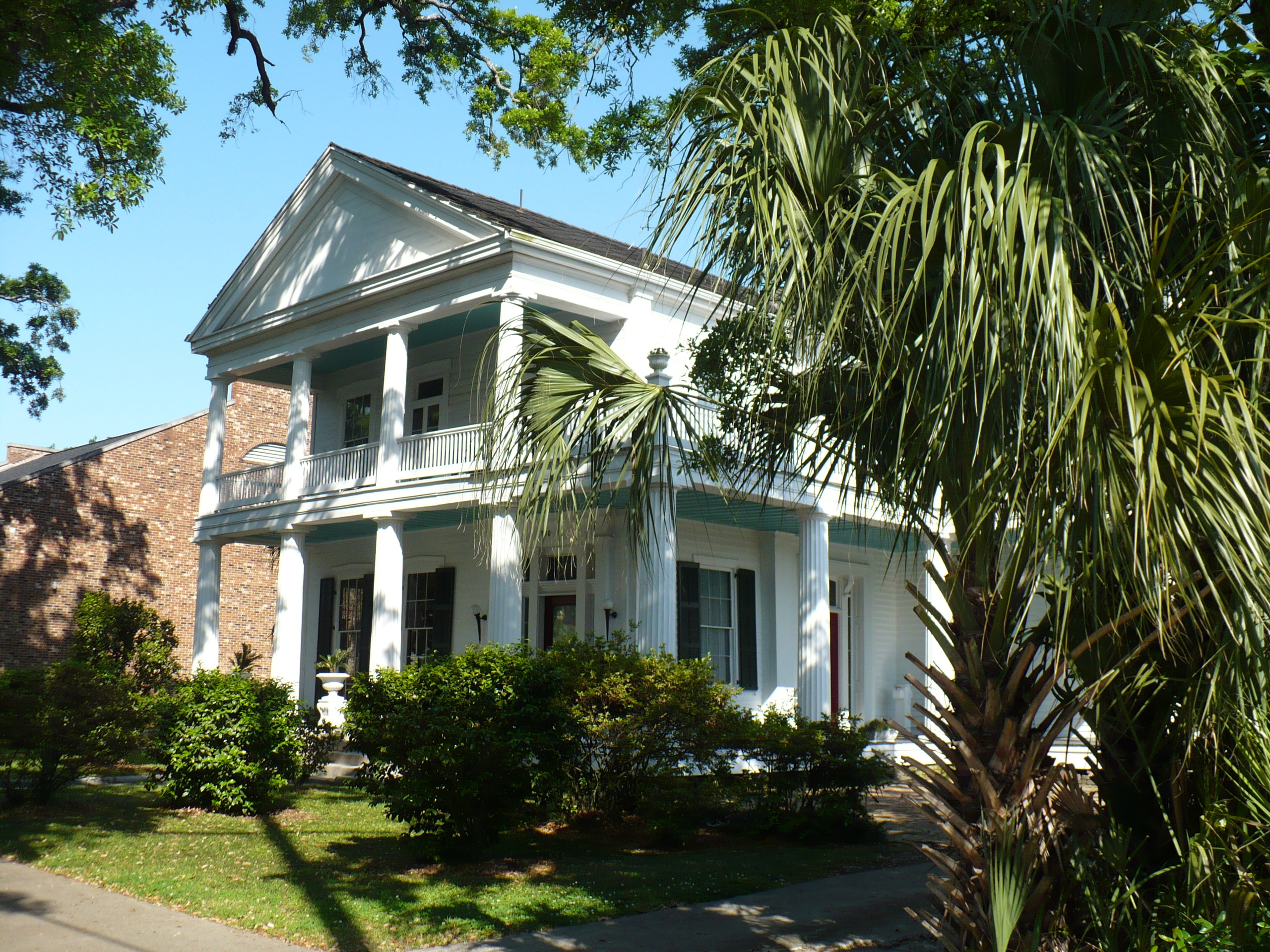
910 Government Street

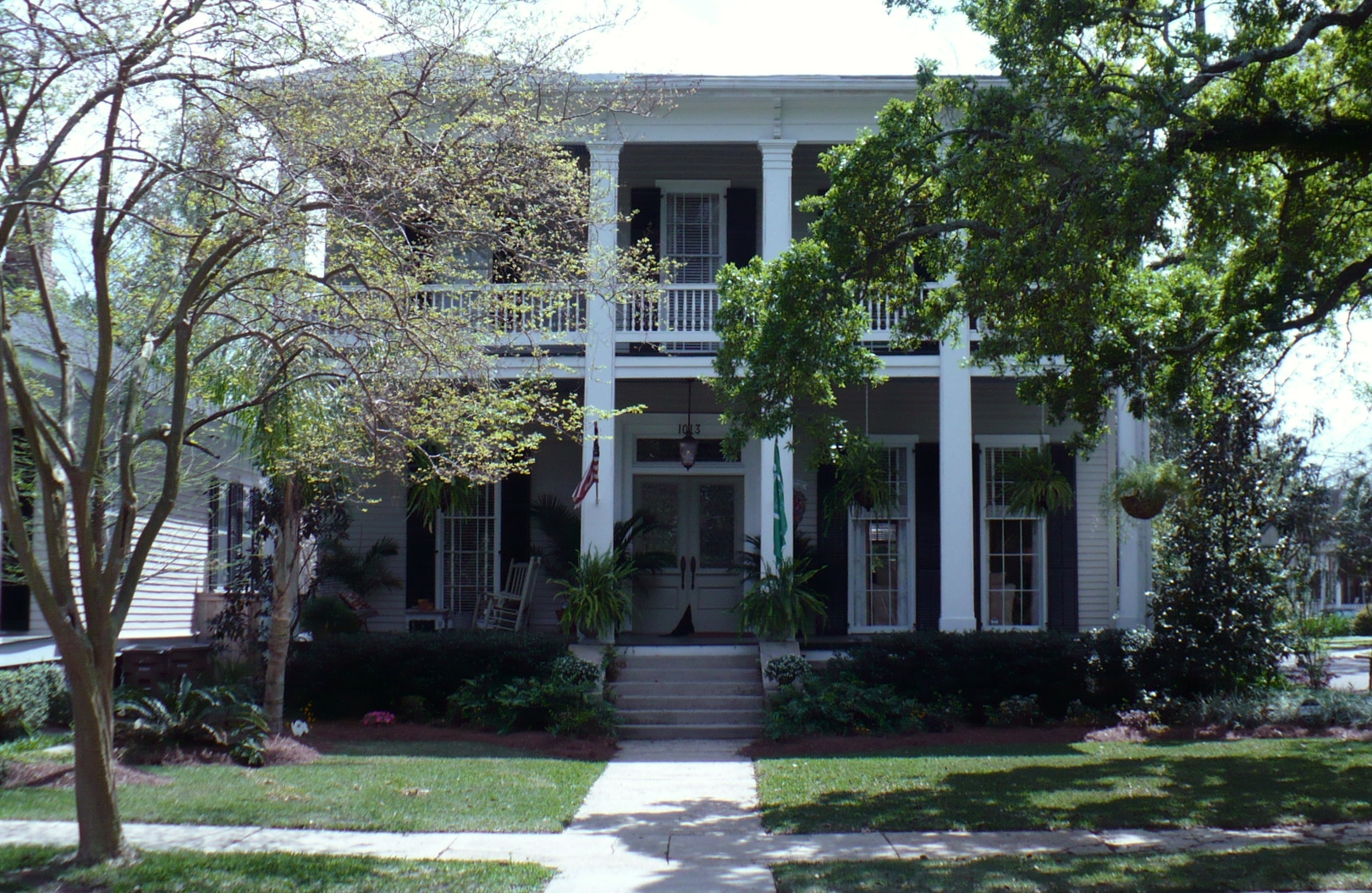
1013 Augusta Street

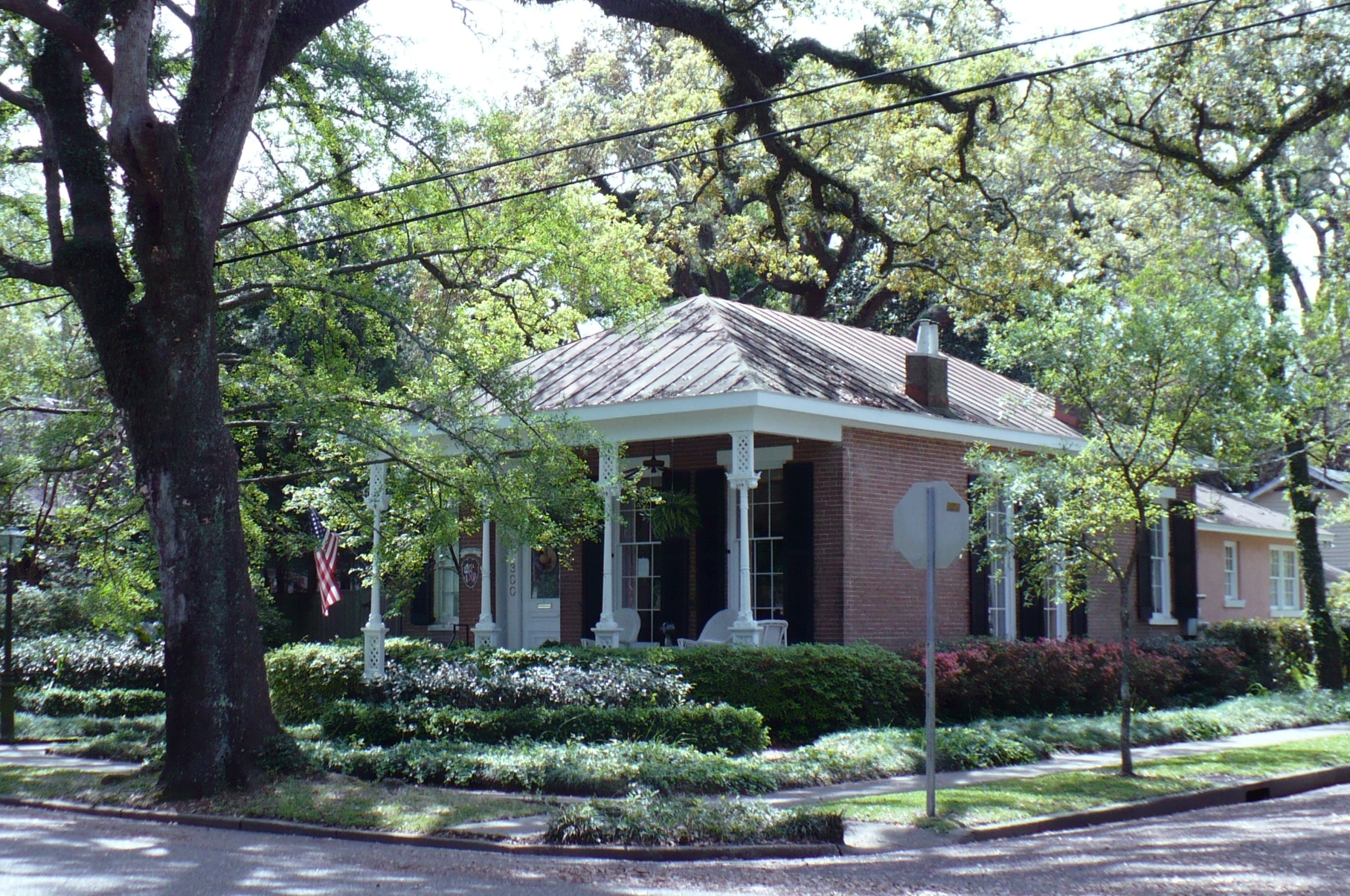
300 Chatham Street

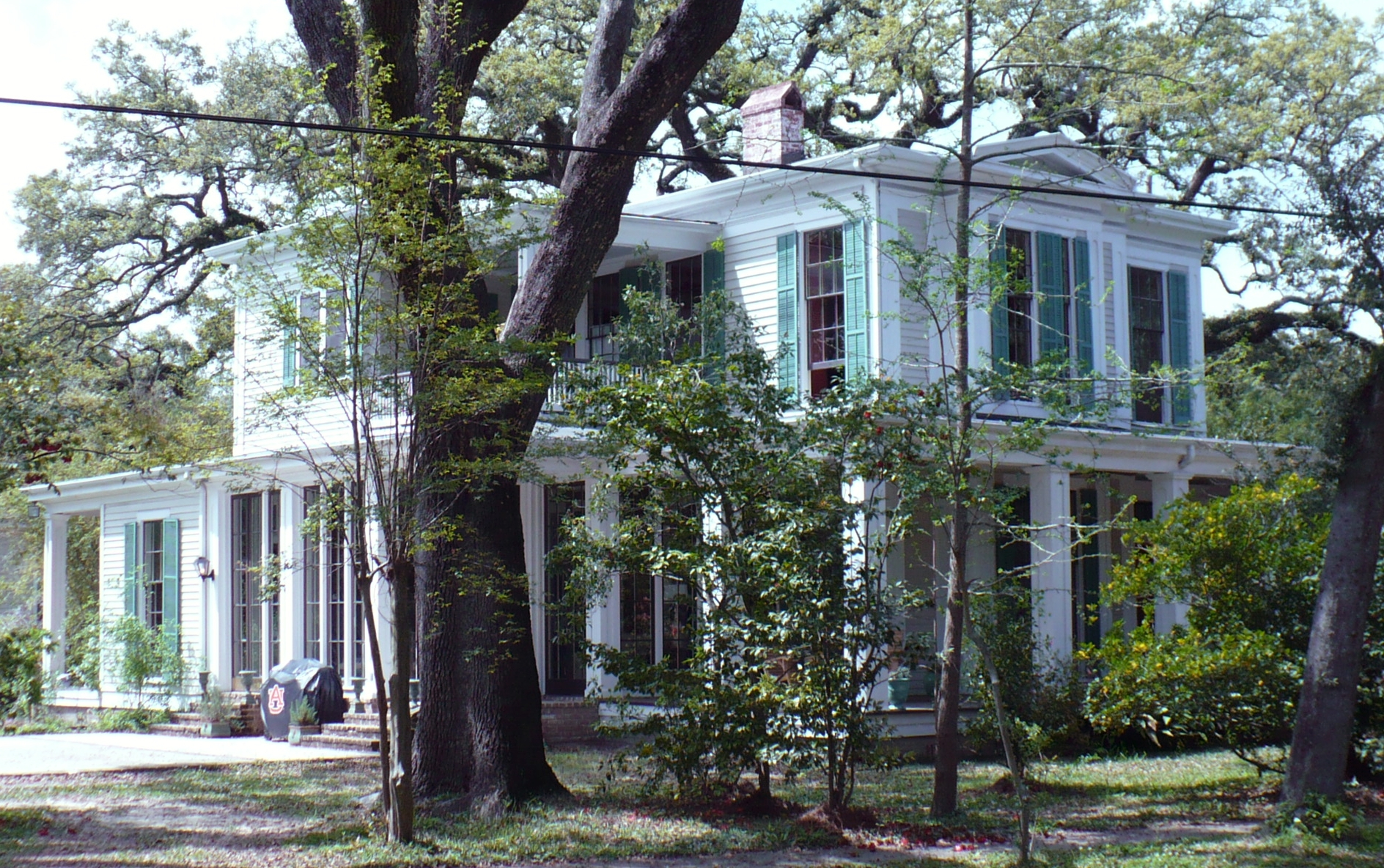
250 Chatham Street

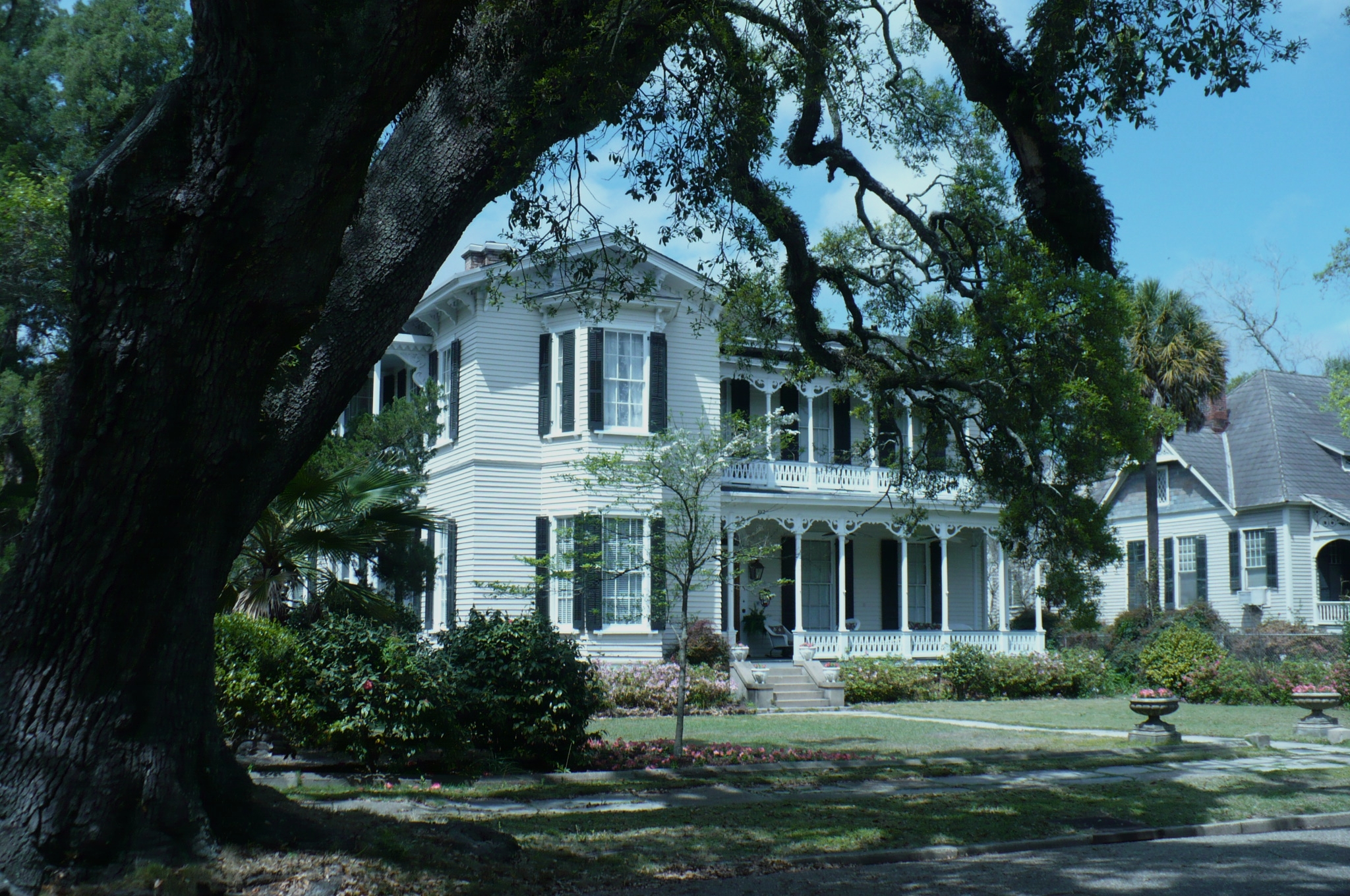
1012 Palmetto Street

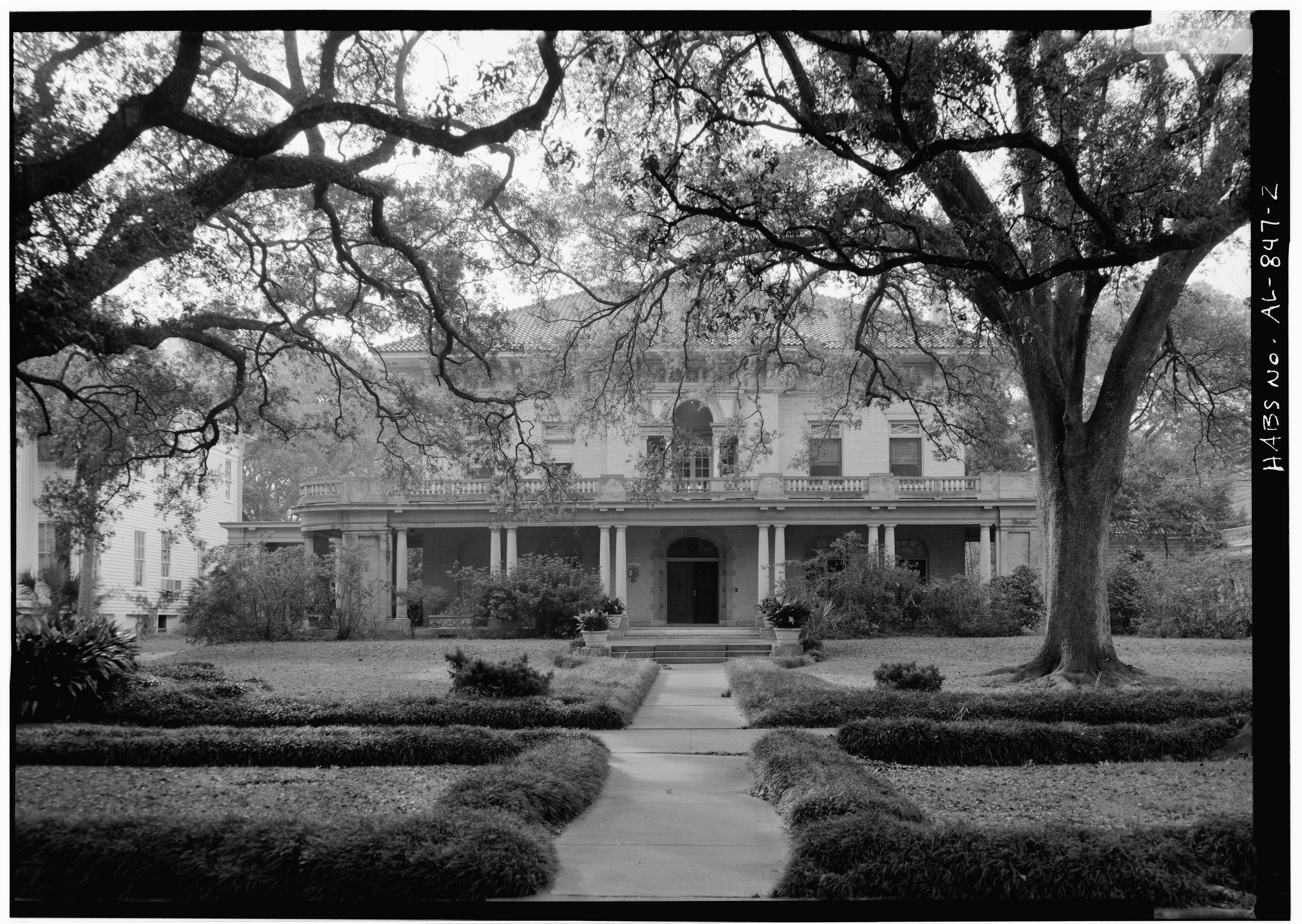
Burgess-Maschmeyer Mansion, 1209 Government Street

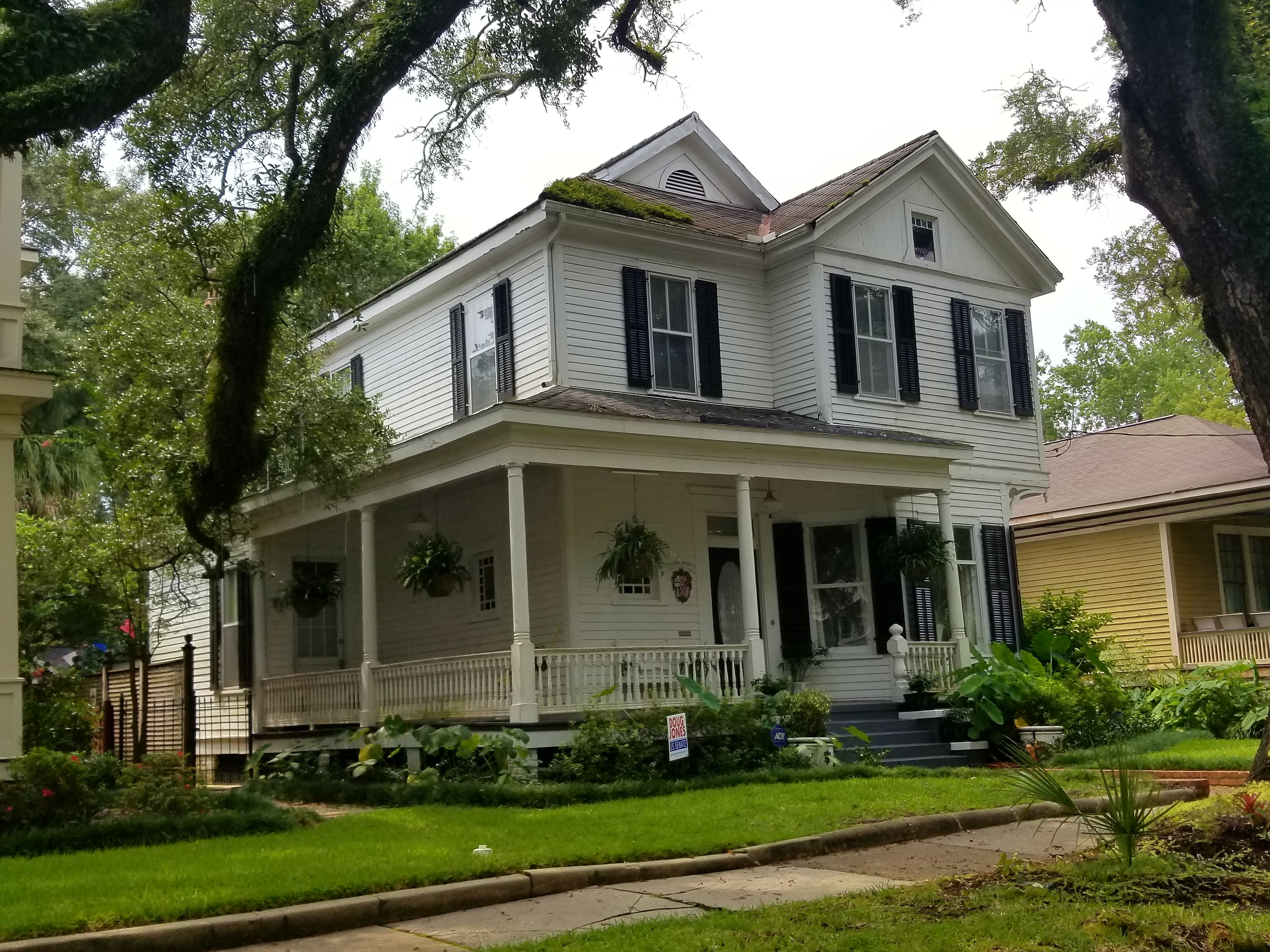
1223 Selma Street - September 2017

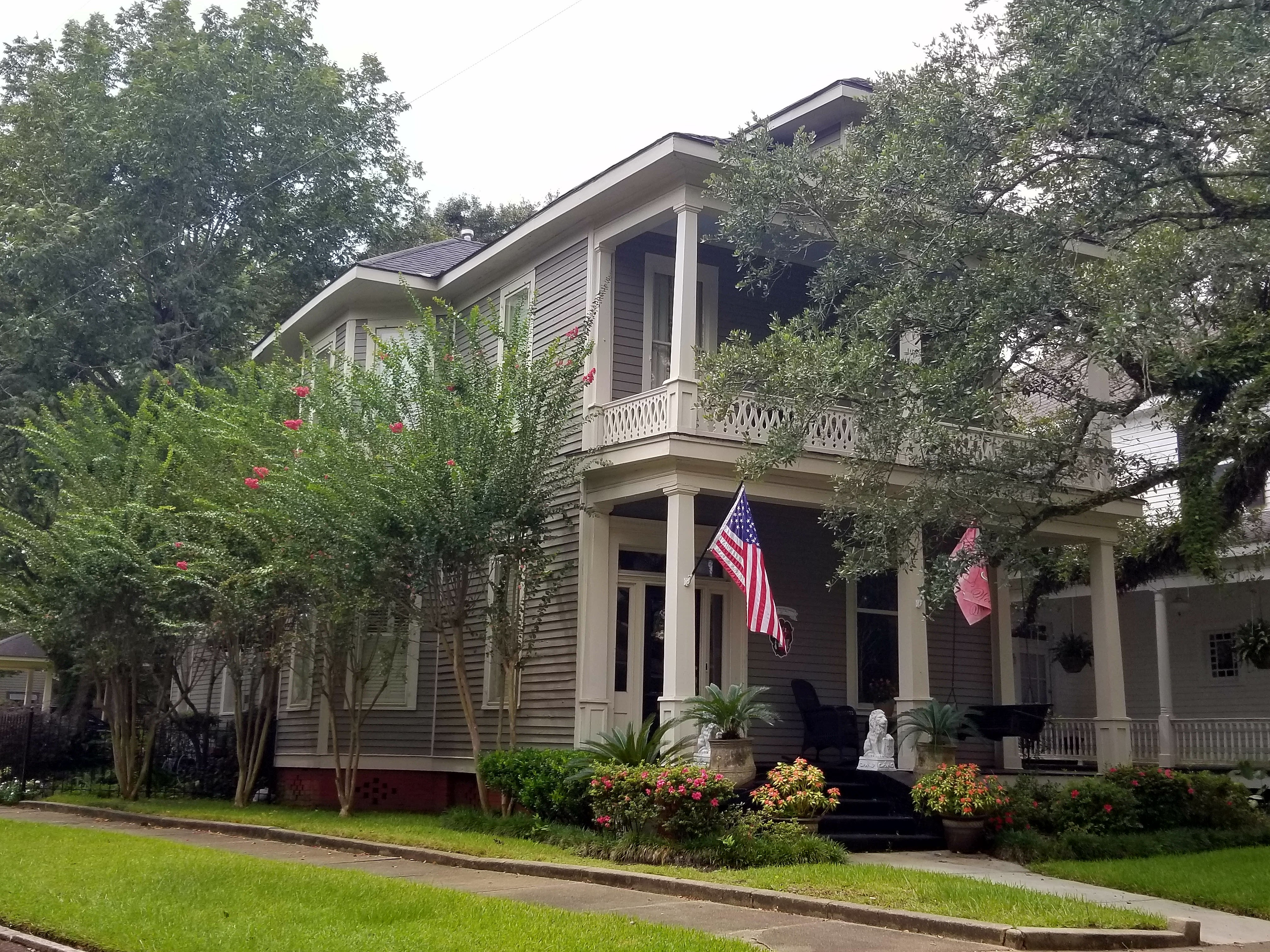
1221 Selma Street - September 2017

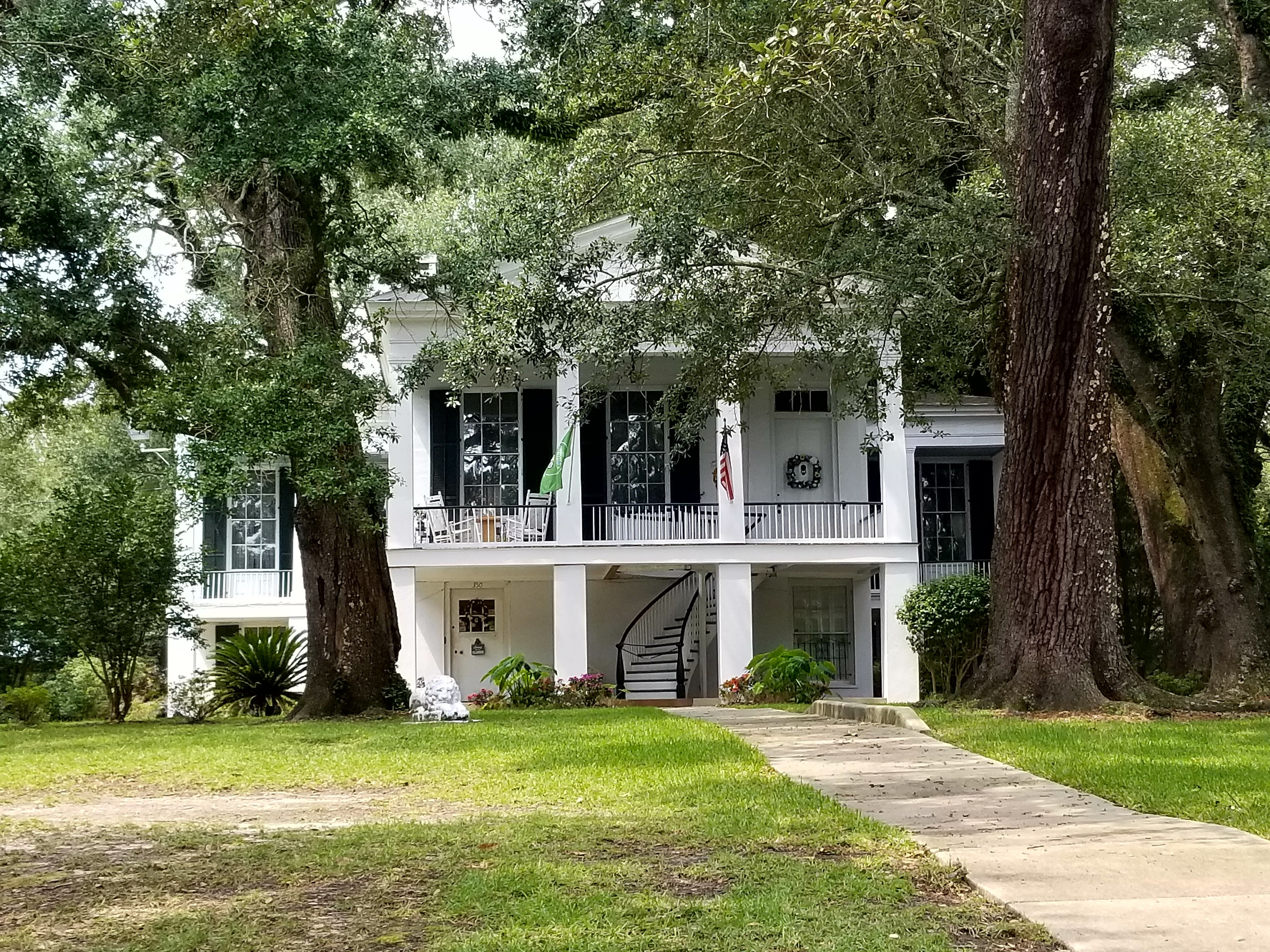
Oakleigh - September 2017
