= Historic Avenue Cultural Center =

African-American museum in Alabama, US

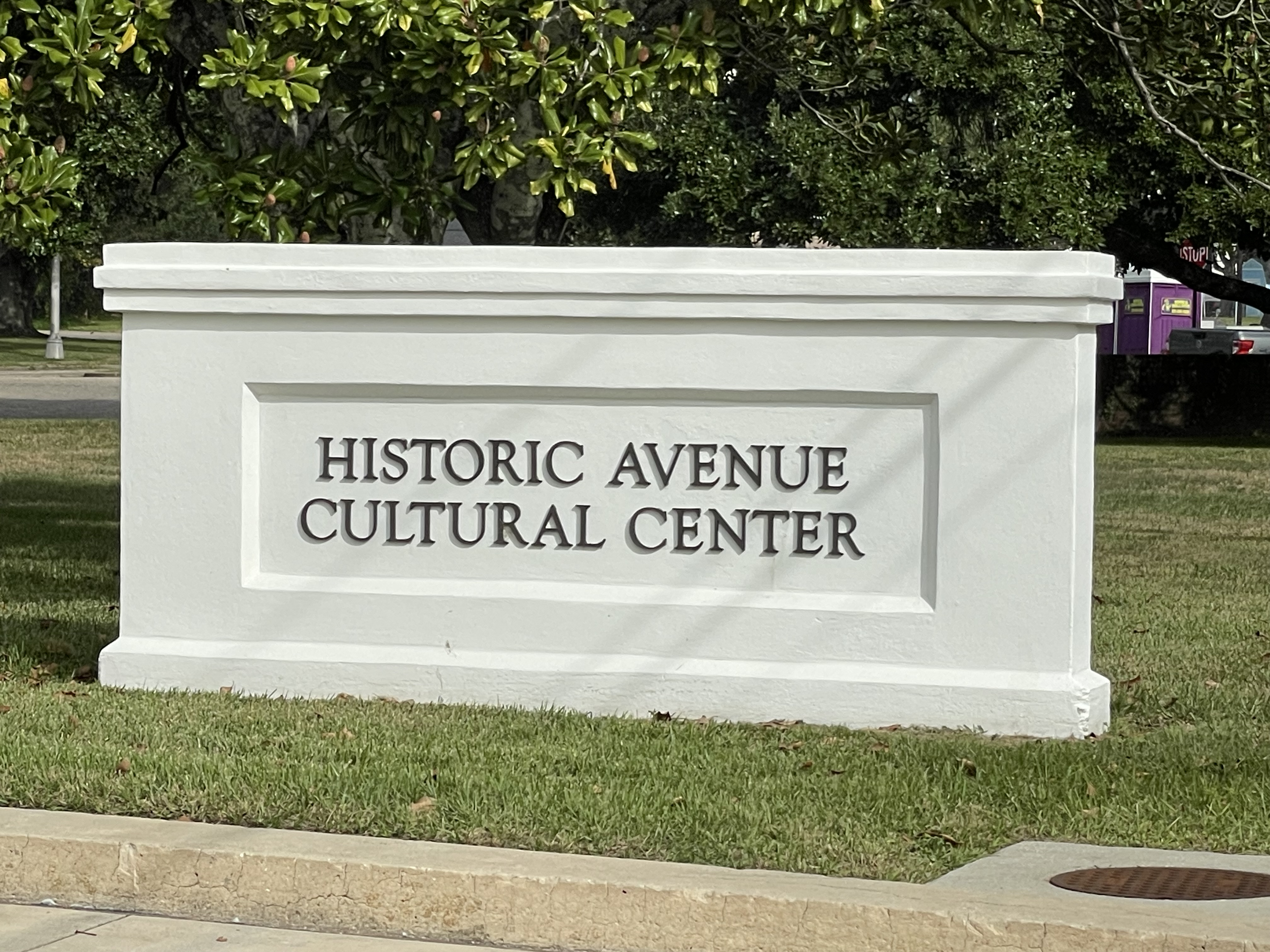
Historic Avenue Cultural Center Monument Sign

The Historic Avenue Cultural Center is an exhibit and event space in Mobile, Alabama’s Civil Rights and Cultural Heritage District. From the early 1990s to approximately 2015, it served as the National African American Archives and Museum. Formerly known as the Davis Avenue Branch of Mobile Public Library, it was the lone Black library in Mobile County during segregation.

== History ==
The Davis Avenue Branch of the Mobile Public Library was built in 1931 to serve the needs of the local African American community. The state was racially segregated and Blacks were prohibited from using libraries designated for Whites. The three-room building was designed by architect George Bigelow Rogers and built for $26,000. The building was modeled after the Ben May Main Library but constructed on a much smaller scale. The local African-American community helped collect used books for the library and to raise funds for the acquisition of new books. During this period of Jim Crow, segregation and the disenfranchisement of African Americans in the state from the turn of the century resulted in underfunding of facilities for them by the state and local governments. African Americans also attended separate schools.

A minor addition was made to the building in 1961. Following desegregation in the late 1960s after federal civil rights legislation was passed, this branch library became used as a storage repository for government documents. The former library building was listed on the National Register of Historic Places in 1983.

In 1992 the Mobile City Council leased the building to a community group that founded the National African American Archives and Multicultural Museum. Its exhibits interpreted the history of African Americans in the city and state, and in the United States. The collection included documents, records, photographs, books, African carvings, furniture, and special collections that relate to the African-American experience in the United States, and artifacts representing the numerous contributions African Americans have made to greater Mobile.

The National African American Archives and Museum closed around 2015 and the City-owned building was dormant for several years. The building reopened in October 2023 as the Historic Avenue Cultural Center.

== See also ==
- List of museums focused on African Americans
