= Magnolia Springs, Alabama =

- Town
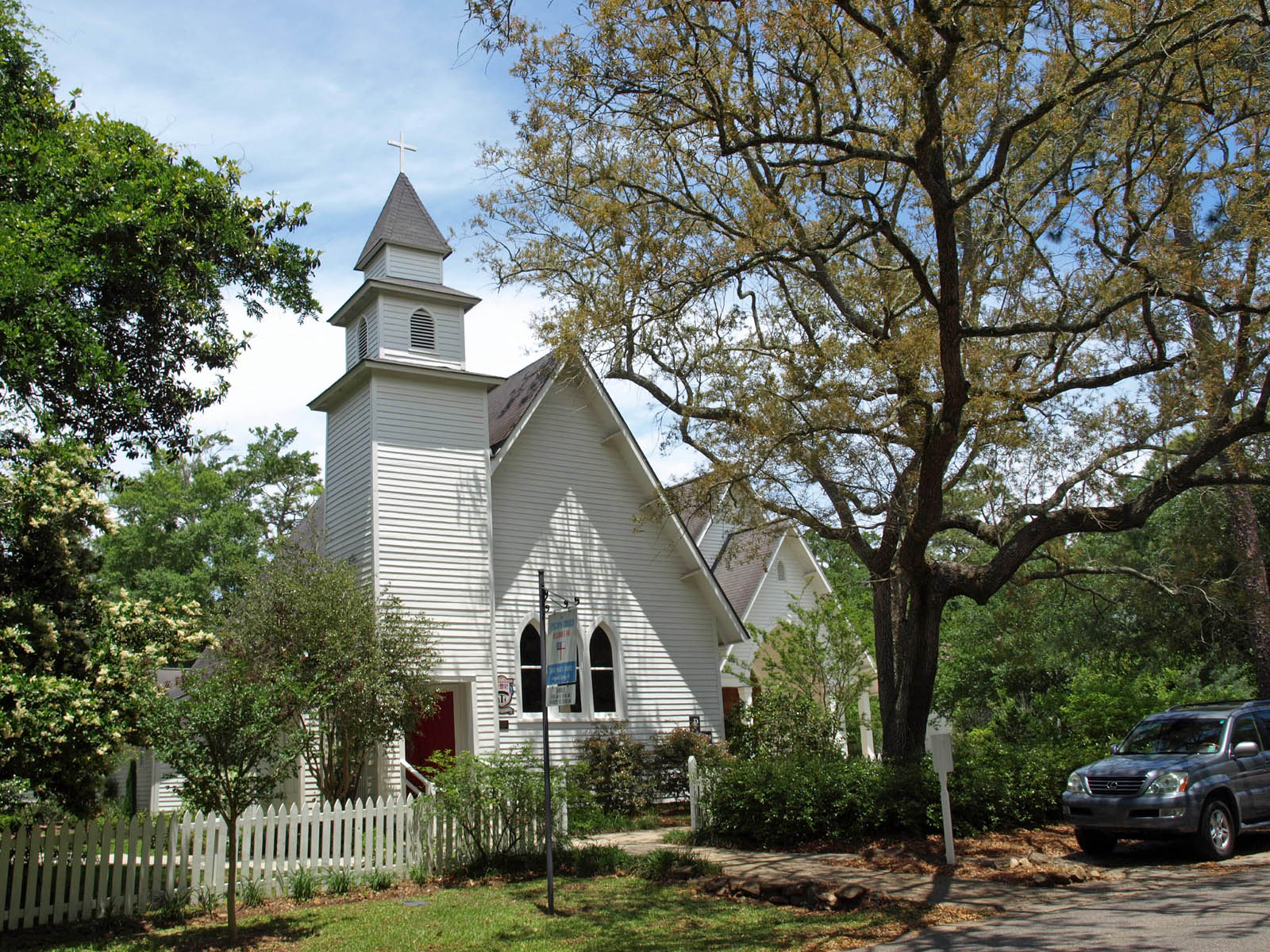
- St. Paul's Episcopal Church

- Logo

- Location of Magnolia Springs in Baldwin County, Alabama.
- Coordinates: 30°24′01″N 87°46′30″W
- Country: United States
- State: Alabama
- County: Baldwin
- Incorporated: June 29, 2006

Area
  - Total: 0.96 sq mi (2.49 km^{2})
  - Land: 0.90 sq mi (2.33 km^{2})
  - Water: 0.062 sq mi (0.16 km^{2})
- Elevation: 30 ft (9.1 m)

Population (2020)
  - Total: 811
  - Density: 902.3/sq mi (348.39/km^{2})
- Time zone: UTC-6 (Central (CST))
  - Summer (DST): UTC-5 (CDT)
- ZIP code: 36555
- Area code: 251
- FIPS code: 01-46072
- GNIS feature ID: 2406080
- Website: www.townofmagnoliasprings.org

Magnolia Springs is a town in south Baldwin County, Alabama, United States, in the Daphne-Fairhope-Foley metropolitan area. The town voted to incorporate in 2006. As of the 2020 census it had a population of 811.

== History ==
Magnolia Springs is located at the headwaters of the Magnolia River, which was originally called River de Lin, Cataract Creek, or River del Salto by local residents. The origins of the community date back to the 1700s with the plantations of French and British settlers lining Magnolia River and Weeks Bay. Cattle, fishing, and masonry were commonplace industries at the time. Later, the largest enterprise in the area was turpentine distillation. These stills were burned by their owners in 1865 to prevent them from being captured when Union soldiers began amassing in the area. Various boats and steamships brought travelers and more residents into the area.

One leaves "the Old Spanish Trail at the eastern head of the Cochrane Bridge, and drives south through Fairhope along Mobile Bay. Ten or fifteen miles beyond is the pleasant little village of Magnolia Springs, and one is in the sandy Gulf Coast soil where these people have their farms and community life. They call themselves 'Creoles', and their white neighbors qualify the term by calling them '[expletive deleted] Creoles.' The question of Negro blood has long been a sensitive spot with the Creole population of Louisiana and other southern states, but in Baldwin County it means only one thing to the dominant white class: some degree of Negro extraction."
"A stop at a little crossroads store where the young Creole clerk volunteered more information led us still farther into the intricacies of life among the Magnolia Springs Creoles. The clerk was a small man whose complexion had a hint of reddish brown, and he was one of the few men in the community who bore a French family name. He claimed to be the great-grandson of an officer in Napoleon's Grande Armée. He had come to the Baldwin County community from across the bay. He gave as his reason the decay of the Creole community in Mobile County, and stated that this disintegration was almost complete."

Several structures in the town are on the National Register of Historic Places, including Moore's Grocery and St. Paul's Episcopal Church.

In May 2006 residents voted 224–96 to approve incorporation. The election results were certified by Baldwin County Probate Judge Adrian Johns on June 29, 2006. Magnolia Springs recognizes this date as the town's anniversary.

According to a United States Postal Service historian, some Magnolia Springs citizens receive mail by boat on the only year-round postal river route in the United States.

== Demographics ==
Historical population
Census	Pop.	Note	%±
2010	723		—
2020	811		12.2%
U.S. Decennial Census; 2013 Estimate

== Post-incorporation ==
The town council initially served without salary, but voted in February 2008 to grant the incoming council members salaries of $100 per month. Initially, the ordinance would have provided salaries of $200 a month for the mayor and $100 for council members, but this was altered to comply with tax reporting laws. A previous measure to pay the mayor and council salaries of $50 a month failed to pass on a 3–3 vote.

The council moved into new quarters around September–October 2007.

The town contracts with the Baldwin County Sheriff's Department for its law enforcement services.

The town is considering annexing parcels within a three-mile radius that would eventually increase the population by 11,000 residents.

=== Education ===
The school district is Baldwin County Public Schools.

== Natural resources ==
The Magnolia River is an important resource for the area's residents. As of 2007, activists were seeking to have it named as an Outstanding Alabama Water, which is the state's highest environmental protection status. "The river is, if you would, the lifeblood of the whole community," Mayor Charles Houser told the Press-Register in 2008. "Whether you're using it for recreation or for whatever else, the river and its health has an impact on the whole community." If it were approved, it would be the third river in the county to enjoy such protection.

The town has declared itself a bird sanctuary. It is working toward renovating the park from which the town derived its name.
