= National Register of Historic Places listings in Houston County, Alabama =

Location of Houston County in Alabama

This is a list of the National Register of Historic Places listings in Houston County, Alabama.

This is intended to be a complete list of the properties and districts on the National Register of Historic Places in Houston County, Alabama, United States. Latitude and longitude coordinates are provided for many National Register properties and districts; these locations may be seen together in an online map.

There are 13 properties and districts listed on the National Register in the county.

This National Park Service list is complete through NPS recent listings posted May 1, 2026.

	Name on the Register	Image	Date listed	Location	City or town	Description
1	Alabama Midland Railway Depot	Alabama Midland Railway Depot	September 12, 1985 (#85002163)	Midland St. 31°10′58″N 85°14′15″W	Ashford	
2	Ashford Commercial District	Ashford Commercial District	January 6, 2025 (#100011228)	Roughly bounded by Adams Street to the N, the CSX railroad to the S, Fifth Avenue to the E, and Third Avenue and Ice House Lane to the W. 31°11′04″N 85°14′09″W	Ashford	
3	Atlantic Coastline Railroad Passenger Depot	Atlantic Coastline Railroad Passenger Depot	January 21, 1994 (#93001519)	Junction of Powell St. and Headland Ave. 31°13′50″N 85°23′30″W	Dothan	
4	Bank of Columbia	Bank of Columbia	April 22, 2024 (#100009568)	105 South Main Street; 31°17′33″N 85°06′41″W	Columbia	
5	Dothan Municipal Light and Water Plant	Dothan Municipal Light and Water Plant	October 3, 1991 (#90001315)	126 N. College St. 31°13′28″N 85°23′20″W	Dothan	
6	Dothan Opera House	Dothan Opera House	December 16, 1977 (#77000204)	103 N. St. Andrews St. 31°13′26″N 85°23′29″W	Dothan	
7	Dupree School		July 5, 2024 (#100010471)	1116 Antioch Church Road; 31°07′43″N 85°14′02″W	Ashford	
8	Federal Building and U.S. Courthouse	Federal Building and U.S. Courthouse	December 31, 1974 (#74000412)	100 W. Troy St. 31°13′31″N 85°23′33″W	Dothan	
9	Howell School		June 26, 2013 (#13000406)	408 E. Newton St. 31°13′43″N 85°23′18″W	Dothan	
10	Main Street Commercial District	Main Street Commercial District	April 21, 1983 (#83002984)	E. Main, Foster, St. Andrews, Crawford, and Troy Sts.; also roughly bounded by Museum Ave., Crawford, Oates, Newton & College Sts. 31°13′24″N 85°23′31″W	Dothan	Second set of addresses represents a boundary increase approved August 13, 2018.
11	Moody Hospital		December 2, 2021 (#100007191)	311 North Alice St. 31°13′38″N 85°23′50″W	Dothan	
12	Purcell-Killingsworth House	Purcell-Killingsworth House	December 16, 1982 (#82001616)	Main St. 31°17′49″N 85°06′40″W	Columbia	This Victorian mansion, also known as "Traveler's Rest", was completed in 1890.
13	Water Works Standpipe	Water Works Standpipe	December 13, 2016 (#16000835)	Intersection of East Powell and North Saint Andrews St., .5 mi. north of Main St. 31°13′49″N 85°23′31″W	Dothan	

== See also ==
- List of National Historic Landmarks in Alabama
- National Register of Historic Places listings in Alabama
