= List of hospitals in Alabama =

Notable hospitals in the state of Alabama

This is a list of hospitals in Alabama (U.S. state), sorted by hospital name.

== Hospitals ==
The American Hospital Directory lists 126 hospitals in Alabama.

Hospital	City	County	Hospital beds	Trauma designation	Notes
Andalusia Health	Andalusia	Covington	83	Level III	
Athens-Limestone Hospital	Athens	Limestone	66	Level III	Owned by Huntsville Hospital
Atmore Community Hospital	Atmore	Escambia	49	Level III	
Atrium Health Floyd Cherokee Medical Center	Centre	Cherokee	45	None	
Baptist Medical Center East	Montgomery	Montgomery	207	None	
Baptist Medical Center South	Montgomery	Montgomery	380	Level II	
Baypointe Hospital	Mobile	Mobile	60	None	Inpatient pediatric psychiatric facility
Beacon Behavioral Hospital	Luverne	Crenshaw	25	None	Inpatient pediatric psychiatric facility
Bibb Medical Center	Centreville	Bibb	156	None	
Brookwood Baptist Medical Center	Homewood	Jefferson	595	Level III	
Bryan Whitfield Memorial Hospital	Demopolis	Marengo	57	Level III	
Bryce Hospital	Tuscaloosa	Tuscaloosa	98	None	Closed 2009, new location opened in May 2014
Bullock County Hospital	Union Springs	Bullock	54	None	
Central Alabama VA Medical Center–Montgomery	Montgomery	Montgomery	45	None	
Central Alabama VA Medical Center–Tuskegee	Tuskegee	Macon	143	None	
Children's of Alabama Russell Campus	Birmingham	Jefferson	341	Level I-Pediatric	Formerly Children's Hospital of Alabama
Choctaw General Hospital	Butler	Choctaw	25	None	
Citizens Baptist	Talladega	Talladega	98	Level III	
Clay County Hospital	Ashland	Clay	129	None	
Community Hospital	Tallassee	Elmore	47	Level III	
Coosa Valley Medical Center	Sylacauga	Talladega	222	Level III	Only hospital in the United States that was built and opened during World War II
Crenshaw Community Hospital	Luverne	Crenshaw	49	None	
Crestwood Medical Center	Huntsville	Madison	183	Level III	
Crossbridge Behavioral Health	Montgomery	Montgomery		None	Inpatient psychiatric facility operated by Baptist Medical Center South
Cullman Regional Medical Center	Cullman	Cullman	175	Level III	
D.W. McMillan Memorial Hospital	Brewton	Escambia	46	Level III	
Dale Medical Center	Ozark	Dale	89	Level III	
DCH Regional Medical Center	Tuscaloosa	Tuscaloosa	620	Level III	
Decatur Morgan Hospital	Decatur	Morgan	286	Level III	
Decatur Morgan Hospital-Parkway Campus	Decatur	Morgan	120	None	
DeKalb Regional Medical Center	Fort Payne	DeKalb	115	Level III	Formerly DeKalb Baptist Medical Center
East Alabama Medical Center	Opelika	Lee	339	Level III	
East Alabama Medical Center – Lanier	Valley	Chambers	187	None	
EastPointe Hospital	Daphne	Baldwin	25	None	Adult inpatient psychiatric facility
Elmore Community Hospital	Wetumpka	Elmore	33	None	
Encompass Health Lakeshore Rehabilitation Hospital	Birmingham	Jefferson	100	None	Formerly HealthSouth Lakshore Rehabilitation Hospital
Encompass Health Rehabilitation Hospital of Dothan	Dothan	Houston	51	None	Formerly HealthSouth Rehabilitation Hospital of Dothan
Encompass Health Rehabilitation Hospital of Gadsden	Gadsden	Etowah	44	None	Formerly HealthSouth Rehabilitation Hospital of Gadsden
Encompass Health Rehabilitation Hospital of Montgomery	Montgomery	Montgomery	70	None	Formerly HealthSouth Rehabilitation Hospital of Montgomery
Encompass Health Rehabilitation Hospital of North Alabama	Huntsville	Madison	70	None	Formerly HealthSouth Rehabilitation Hospital of North Alabama
Encompass Health Rehabilitation Hospital of Shelby County	Pelham	Shelby	34	None	
Evergreen Medical Center	Evergreen	Conecuh	44	None	
Fayette Medical Center	Fayette	Fayette	167	None	
Flowers Hospital	Dothan	Houston	235	Level III	
Gadsden Regional Medical Center	Gadsden	Etowah	271	Level III	
Grandview Medical Center	Birmingham	Jefferson	402	Level III	
Greene County Hospital	Eutaw	Greene	92	None	
Grove Hill Memorial Hospital	Grove Hill	Clarke	30	Level III	
Hale County Hospital	Greensboro	Hale	28	None	
Helen Keller Hospital	Sheffield	Colbert	178	Level III	
Highlands Medical Center	Scottsboro	Jackson	95	Level III	
Hill Crest Behavioral Health Services	Birmingham	Jefferson	154	None	Inpatient psychiatric facility
Hill Hospital of Sumter County	York	Sumter	33	None	
Huntsville Hospital System	Huntsville	Madison	912	Level I	Not recognized by the American College of Surgeons. Includes Huntsville Hospital for Women and Children.
Infirmary LTAC Hospital	Mobile	Mobile	22	None	Moved from the former Infirmary West campus to the Mobile Infirmary Medical Center campus in 2010
Jack Hughston Memorial Hospital	Phenix City	Russell	47	None	
Jackson Hospital	Montgomery	Montgomery	270	Level III	
Jackson Medical Center	Jackson	Clarke	35	None	
John Paul Jones Hospital	Camden	Wilcox	21	None	
L.V. Stabler Memorial Hospital	Greenville	Butler	57	Level III	
Lake Martin Community Hospital	Dadeville	Tallapoosa	46	None	
Lakeland Community Hospital	Haleyville	Winston	58	Level III	Formerly Burdick-West Hospital
Laurel Oaks Behavioral Health Center	Dothan	Houston	123	None	
Lawrence Medical Center	Moulton	Lawrence	43	None	
Madison Hospital	Madison	Madison	90	None	Owned by Huntsville Hospital
Marshall Medical Center North	Guntersville	Marshall	90	Level III	
Marshall Medical Center South	Boaz	Marshall	204	Level III	
Mary Starke Harper Geriatric Psychiatry Center	Tuscaloosa	Tuscaloosa	126	None	Inpatient psychiatric services for elderly citizens throughout the state
Medical Center Barbour	Eufaula	Barbour	47	Level III	
Medical Center Enterprise	Enterprise	Coffee	99	Level III	
Mizell Memorial Hospital	Opp	Covington	59	Level III	
Mobile Infirmary Medical Center	Mobile	Mobile	669	Level III	
Monroe County Hospital	Monroeville	Monroe	49	Level III	
Mountain View Hospital	Gadsden	Etowah	68	None	
Noland Hospital Anniston	Anniston	Calhoun	38	None	
Noland Hospital Birmingham	Birmingham	Jefferson	45	None	Moved from St Vincent's East 8th Floor to St Vincent's Hospital 5th Floor sometime around 2021-2022
Noland Hospital Dothan	Dothan	Houston	38	None	
Noland Hospital Montgomery	Montgomery	Montgomery	65	None	
Noland Hospital Tuscaloosa	Tuscaloosa	Tuscaloosa	38	None	
North Alabama Medical Center	Florence	Lauderdale	263	Level III	Replaced Eliza Coffee Memorial Hospital
North Alabama Specialty Hospital	Athens	Limestone	31	None	
North Baldwin Infirmary	Bay Minette	Baldwin	70	Level III	
North Mississippi Medical Center – Hamilton	Hamilton	Marion	115	None	
Northeast Alabama Regional Medical Center	Anniston	Calhoun	323	Level III	
Northport Medical Center	Northport	Tuscaloosa	207	None	
Northwest Medical Center	Winfield	Marion	71	Level III	
Prattville Baptist Hospital	Prattville	Autauga	55	None	
Princeton Baptist Medical Center	Birmingham	Jefferson	309	Level III	Formerly known as Birmingham Infirmary
Red Bay Hospital	Red Bay	Franklin	25	None	
Regional Rehabilitation Hospital	Phenix City	Russell	58	None	
Riverview Regional Medical Center	Gadsden	Etowah	281	Level III	
RMC Stringfellow Memorial Hospital	Anniston	Calhoun	127	Level III	
Russell Medical Center	Alexander City	Tallapoosa	34	Level III	
Russellville Hospital	Russellville	Franklin	49	Level III	
Select Specialty Hospital – Birmingham	Birmingham	Jefferson	38	None	Located inside Brookwood Baptist Medical Center
Shelby Baptist Medical Center	Alabaster	Shelby	252	Level III	
Shoals Hospital	Muscle Shoals	Colbert	184	Level III	
South Baldwin Regional Medical Center	Foley	Baldwin	112	Level III	
Southeast Health Medical Center	Dothan	Houston	342	Level II	
Springhill Medical Center	Mobile	Mobile	209	Level III	
St. Vincent's Blount	Oneonta	Blount	25	None	
St. Vincent's Chilton	Clanton	Chilton	26	None	
St. Vincent's East	Birmingham	Jefferson	349	Level III	
St. Vincent's Hospital	Birmingham	Jefferson	400	None	
St. Vincent's St. Clair	Pell City	St. Clair	40	None	
Tanner Medical Center East Alabama	Wedowee	Randolph	15	None	Formerly Wedowee Hospital
Taylor Hardin Secure Medical Facility	Tuscaloosa	Tuscaloosa	115	None	Comprehensive psychiatric evaluation/treatment for criminally committed citizens throughout the state; forensic evaluations
Thomas Hospital	Fairhope	Baldwin	141	Level III	
Thomasville Regional Medical Center	Thomasville	Clarke	29	None	
Troy Regional Medical Center	Troy	Pike	115	Level III	
UAB Callahan Eye Hospital	Birmingham	Jefferson	12	Level I-Ocular Trauma	Was the first Level I ocular trauma center in the nation
UAB Hospital	Birmingham	Jefferson	1,242	Level I	Verified by the American College of Surgeons
UAB Hospital Highlands	Birmingham	Jefferson	73	None	Formerly HealthSouth Medical Center, originally South Highlands Infirmary
UAB Medical West	Bessemer	Jefferson	231	None	Formerly Bessemer Carraway Medical Center, Originally Memorial Hospital
Unity Psychiatric Care Huntsville	Huntsville	Madison	20	None	Inpatient geriatric psychiatric facility
USA Health Children's & Women's Hospital	Mobile	Mobile	152 + 158 bassinets	None	
USA Health Providence Hospital	Mobile	Mobile	349	Level III	
USA Health University Hospital	Mobile	Mobile	406	Level I	Level I trauma center. Verified by the American College of Surgeons.
Vaughan Regional Medical Center	Selma	Dallas	109	Level III	Housed in the Joseph T. Smitherman Historic Building from 1911 to 1960.
Veterans Affairs Medical Center-Birmingham	Birmingham	Jefferson	313	None	
Veterans Affairs Medical Center-Tuscaloosa	Tuscaloosa	Tuscaloosa	702	None	
Walker Baptist Medical Center	Jasper	Walker	259	Level III	
Washington County Hospital	Chatom	Washington	103	None	
Wiregrass Medical Center	Geneva	Geneva	185	None	

== Defunct hospitals ==
Hospital name	City	County	Hospital beds	Trauma designation	Year founded	Year closed	Notes
Carraway Methodist Medical Center	Birmingham	Jefferson	617	None	1908	2008	
Chilton Medical Center	Clanton	Chilton	60	None		2012	
Cleburne Community Hospital and Nursing Home	Heflin	Cleburne				1990	
Cooper Green Mercy Hospital	Birmingham	Jefferson	319	None	1972		No longer a hospital, urgent care and outpatient services only
Elba General Hospital	Elba	Coffee	20	None		2013	
Eliza Coffee Memorial Hospital	Florence	Lauderdale	358	None	1919	2018	Replaced by North Alabama Medical Center
Florala Memorial Hospital	Florala	Covington	23	None		2013	
Georgiana Medical Center	Georgiana	Butler	22	None	1955	2019	
Greil Memorial Psychiatric Hospital	Montgomery	Montgomery	76	None	1974	2012	
Hale Infirmary	Montgomery	Montgomery	60	None	1890	1958	
Hartselle Medical Center	Hartselle	Morgan	150	None	1948	2012	Closed on January 31, 2012
Infirmary West	Mobile	Mobile	124	Level III		2012	
John A. Andrew Memorial Hospital	Tuskegee	Macon		None	1892	1987	Founded as the Tuskegee Institute Hospital and Nurse Training School as a teaching hospital. First and last operating black hospital in Alabama.
Lamar Regional Hospital	Vernon	Lamar	45	None		1996	Originally planned to be used as an assisted living facility
Lloyd Noland Hospital	Fairfield	Jefferson	319	None	1919	2004	Originally named Employees Hospital of the Tennessee Coal, Iron, and Railroad Company, named for founder Dr. Lloyd Noland. Was briefly known as Healthsouth Metro West Hospital.
Mobile City Hospital	Mobile	Mobile		None	1831	1966	Listed on the National Register of Historic Places.
Moody Hospital	Dothan	Houston	71	None	1916	1965	Listed on the National Register of Historic Places.
North Alabama Regional Hospital	Decatur	Morgan	74	None	1977	2015	Regional inpatient psychiatric services for adult citizens in the northern part of the state
Pickens County Medical Center	Carrollton	Pickens	56	None	1979	2020	
Randolph Medical Center	Roanoke	Randolph	25	None		May 2011	
Regional Medical Center of Jacksonville	Jacksonville	Calhoun	104	None	1976	2018	
Searcy Hospital	Mount Vernon	Mobile	260	None		2012	
United States Marine Hospital	Mobile	Mobile		None	1842	1974	Served as the tuberculosis hospital for the Sixth District Tuberculosis Association from 1955 to 1974. Listed on the National Register of Historic Places.
Walker County Hospital	Jasper	Walker	61	None	1923	1980	Listed on the National Register of Historic Places and Alabama Register of Landmarks and Heritage.
W. D. Partlow Developmental Center	Tuscaloosa	Tuscaloosa	190	None		2012	Closed by the state of Alabama in January 2012
Woodland Medical Center	Cullman	Cullman		None		2009	Purchased by Cullman Regional Medical Center 15 July 2009, and closed
