= Carraway Methodist Medical Center =

- Carraway Infirmary

Geography
- Location: Birmingham, Alabama, Alabama, United States
- Coordinates: 33°32′11″N 86°48′38″W

Organization
- Affiliated university: None
- Patron: None

Helipads
- Helipad: Yes

History
- Founded: 1908 by Dr. Charles N. Carraway

Links
- Lists: Hospitals in Alabama
- Other links: List of hospitals in Alabama

Carraway Methodist Medical Center was a medical facility in Birmingham, Alabama founded as Carraway Infirmary in 1908 by Dr. Charles N. Carraway. It was moved in 1917 to Birmingham's Norwood neighborhood. Its facilities were segregated according to skin color for much of its history and, in one instance, the facility refused emergency treatment to James Peck, an injured white civil rights activist who had been savagely beaten for being a Freedom Rider. This hospital was three miles from St. Vincent's. It expanded in the 1950s and 1960s and ran into financial trouble in the 2000s, declaring bankruptcy and closing in 2008.

Throughout its history Carraway Methodist Medical Center was a pace-setter. In the 1980s, the facility added the area's only Level 1 Trauma Center, 3 LifeSaver Helicopters, a hyperbaric oxygen therapy department, a wound care center, the laser center, the area's first Sleep Center, among many other groundbreaking additions. Lifesaver, the first medical helicopter service in Alabama, came about because Carraway found a lot of patients in 1978 couldn't make it to Birmingham's higher-level hospitals. So by 1981, he had Lifesaver in place along with the trauma center. The helicopter program carried 30,000 patients as part of Carraway hospital, and was one of only 5% of emergency flight programs in the nation that placed physicians on every flight.

CN Carraway continued until the original organization was sold in bankruptcy. "When you're sick, you want the administration to be as compassionate as the nurses, the caregivers, and the doctors. So administration is not just about the bottom line dollar," Robert Carraway, grandson to CN Carraway, said.

== History ==
Dr. Charles N. Carraway founded the hospital in 1908, in a house in Pratt City, now a neighborhood in Birmingham, with the capacity to treat 16 patients. Carraway was an innovator in many ways: "Carraway financed the new facility by getting Birmingham businesses to agree to pay $1 a month per employee, or $1.25 per family, for treatment. It was managed care before managed care even had a name." In 1917, Carraway bought a lot on the corner of Sixteenth Avenue and Twenty-fifth Street, in the Norwood neighborhood, and moved the hospital, which came to be called the Norwood Hospital. In 1949, the hospital received $200,000 in federal money to add a nursing wing.

In the 1940s, Charles Carraway donated the hospital to the Methodist church, and being renamed Carraway Methodist, with Carraway remaining the chair and CEO. In 1957, Charles Carraway suffered a stroke. In response the hospital board elected his son, Dr Ben Carraway, to take over the running of the Facility.

He increased the hospital from 256 beds to 617. A Christmas star placed on the roof in 1958 became a noted Birmingham landmark. The star remained long after the hospital closed. In 1993 Dr Robert Carraway, son of Ben Carraway (who had served part of his residency and his entire career at the hospital) was elected to take over as CEO and chair when Ben Carraway too had a stroke.

The hospital fell into financial difficulties in the beginning of the 2000s. At the time, it was run by the founder's grandson, Dr. Robert Carraway. According to The Birmingham News, two factors were responsible for the institution's financial demise: the decay of the Norwood neighborhood and "decades of decisions favoring patient care over profits." Hospital leadership made unsuccessful investments, did not adjust staffing or service lines to adjust to diminishing patient volume, or adequately respond to the rapidly changing healthcare delivery environment of the time. It shut down on October 31, 2008, after nearly a century in operation. In 2009, the facility was being considered as the new home for the 340 patients at Bryce Hospital in Tuscaloosa.

In 2011, The Lovelady Center, a non-profit women's rehab center, purchased the hospital property and renamed it "Metro Plaza."

In 2022, The building is said to be demolished as it has deteriorated from vandalism, vegetation growth, and mold growth. The complex is also to be demolished for a proposed Avenue called "The Star".

January 3, 2024, A groundbreaking ceremony was held to mark construction of a new amphitheater on the site for a venue initially named Birmingham's Star Amphitheater. Initial groundwork began in Spring of 2024. Coca-Cola signed a multi-year deal for naming rights, and the venue saw its first show on with comedian Matt Rife on June 22, 2025. The venue re-utilizes four parking structures that were built for the Carraway Medical center.

== Notable incidents and patients ==
Much of Carraway's history took place during segregation, which "dictat[ed] virtually every element of Birmingham race relations." A noteworthy incident involving the then-segregated hospital happened in May 1961, when the staff refused admittance to James Peck, a Freedom Rider who had been severely beaten by Klansmen after descending the Trailways bus, the second bus with Freedom Riders to leave Atlanta, Georgia; he was later treated at Jefferson Hillman Hospital. The segregational policy of the hospital is rendered in prose fiction also, in Anthony Grooms's 2001 novel Bombingham. By 1968, the hospital was racially integrated; a notable patient in 1968 was Robert Edward Chambliss, convicted in 1977 for the 1963 16th Street Baptist Church bombing. In the 1970s still, accusations of racial preference, in for instance hiring practices, were made against the hospital.

In April 1998, some of the Jefferson County F5 tornado victims were sent to Carraway and remained there until recovery.

Carraway has collaborated with Talladega Speedway for decades, providing medical care during auto racing events such as the Alabama 500 and Talladega 500. It is scheduled to be demolished by the end of May, 2022.

== Use In Media ==
The hospital served as a filming location for Skillet’s music video of the song “Monster” and the 2021 film “Castle Falls”
