= Doerge =

Doerge is a surname. Notable people with the surname include:

- Craig Doerge (born 1947), American musician
- Jean M. Doerge (1937–2026), American teacher and politician
- Rebecca Doerge (fl. 1986), American statistician
