= Jean M. Doerge =

American politician and educator (1937–2026)

Jean McGlothlin Doerge
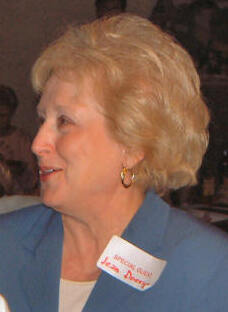

Member of the Louisiana House of Representatives from the 10th district
- In office 1998–2012
- Preceded by: Everett Doerge
- Succeeded by: Gene Reynolds

Personal details
- Born: Jean McGlothlin; June 4, 1937 Galbraith, Louisiana, U.S.
- Died: March 30, 2026 (aged 88) Minden, Louisiana, U.S.
- Party: Democratic
- Spouse: Everett Doerge
- Children: 1

Jean McGlothlin Doerge (pronounced DURR-ghee; June 4, 1937 – March 30, 2026) was an American politician and educator who was the director of the Germantown Colony and Museum in Webster Parish, Louisiana, and a Democratic member of the Louisiana House of Representatives, representing District 10 (Webster Parish, Minden) from 1998 to 2012. From 2001 to 2006, she served as the vice chair of the House's Commerce Committee; in 2007, she was appointed to the Louisiana House Appropriations Committee, and from 2008 to 2012, she served as the vice chair of the Retirement Committee.

== Formative years ==
Born on June 4, 1937, in Galbraith, Louisiana, Jean McGlothlin was one of seven daughters of the late Thomas McGlothlin (1903–1966) and Cora (Vercher) McGlothlin (1904–1975). A graduate of Cloutierville High School in Cloutierville, Louisiana, she graduated from Northwestern State University in Natchitoches Parish in 1958. While attending school there, she met and, in 1957, married Minden, Louisiana native Everett Doerge. In 1965, they adopted daughter Sherie. Jean M. Doerge subsequently pursued graduate studies, earning a master's degree from Louisiana State University in Baton Rouge, as well as an additional thirty credit hours in professional education from Louisiana Tech University in Ruston.

== Teaching career ==
Employed as an educator at Minden High School, Jean McGlothlin Doerge later taught for two years at the Arp Independent School in Smith County, Texas, before returning to Louisiana, where she secured an office position in Natchitoches Parish while her husband worked for Northwestern University. She subsequently returned to teaching in Cotton Valley, Webster Parish and, in 1966, returned to Minden High School, where she was employed in the business education department, and was named "Louisiana Business Educator of the Year” in 1985. She and her husband both retired from teaching at Minden in 1992.

== Political life and husband's death ==
In 1974, Jean Doerge’s husband, Everett, served as the secretary of the Minden Democratic Central Committee. He subsequently ran for, and was elected to the Louisiana House of Representatives, defeating the Republican incumbent Eugene S. Eason by 71 votes on November 16, 1991. An advocate for improved funding for public schools and increased teacher pay throughout his legislative tenure, he also pushed to improve roads and freeways, including making a proposal in 1992 to widen Louisiana Highway 7 to four lanes between the Red River Parish communities of Coushatta and Springhill. That same year, he was part of a successful effort to protect the public from inexperienced drivers via legislation that required teens to participate in driver education programs and raised the driving age to 16. He then underwent heart surgery in December. Reelected in 1995, he obtained 63 percent of the vote to defeat Republican challengers Helaine George and Pamela Hillidge, but was unable to complete that term. Hospitalized after suffering a heart attack on April 7, 1998, he died ten days later at the age of 62.

Jean M. Doerge then chose to run in the special election that was held to fill her husband’s seat in the Louisiana House of Representatives. A 60-year-old widow at the time, she garnered 67 percent of the vote to defeat oil company owner Garland Mack Garrett. After serving out the remainder of her husband’s final term, she was then reelected twice in her own right—in 1999 and 2003. Diagnosed with breast cancer, she reported in 2004 that her doctors had informed her that her treatment had been successful. Three years later, she ran for the Louisiana House and was reelected again, earning 57 percent of the vote as she defeated Webster Parish School Board president Ronnie Broughton. Her legislative career then ended in January 2012 due to term limits; she was succeeded by Gene Reynolds (Democrat-Dubberly), who earned 54.7 percent of the vote to defeat his Republican opponent, Jeri de Pingre.

Among her legislative accomplishments, Jean Doerge facilitated the creation, in 2001, of a fire and emergency training service district—the second such district created in Louisiana, facilitated grant funding for the Spring Theater and Cotton Valley water system, assisted Dubberly residents in fixing problems with failing wells by obtaining water service for them, enabled the Springhill Medical Center to obtain additional financial support by securing its 2002 addition to the Rural Hospital Coalition list, helped pave the way for the creation of the Frank Anthony Park jogging trail and Springhill’s center for tourism and, in 2013, secured state support to fund the relocation of the Northwest Louisiana Technical College from Minden to a site closer to Interstate 20. Vice chair of the House's Commerce Committee from 2001 to 2006, she was appointed to the Louisiana House Appropriations Committee in 2007, and served as the vice chair of the Retirement Committee from 2008 to 2012. She was also a member of the Democratic Caucus and the Hurricane Katrina Memorial Commission.

=== Germantown Colony and Museum ===
Another of Jean Doerge's legislative successes was to establish a secure foundation for the operation of the Germantown Colony and Museum in Minden, which would help to tell the story of German immigrants who settled in northern Louisiana during the mid-19th century. In 2010, she authored HB1238 to create the museum’s governing board, which was later signed into law by the governor of Louisiana as Act 308. She then secured state funding for a visitors’ center at that museum. The center’s construction cost $512,000; that center opened in 2014. Following the end of her legislative career, she became the director of the Germantown Colony and Museum.

== Death ==
Doerge died in Minden on March 30, 2026, at the age of 88.

== Awards and honors ==
- Member, Hall of Distinction, College of Business, Northwestern State University.
- Member, Wall of Fame, Future Business Leaders of America.
- Recipient, Golden Apple and Golden Rose awards, Delta Kappa Gamma Society.
- Recipient, SACS award, Southern Association of Colleges and Schools Commission.
