= Children's of Alabama =

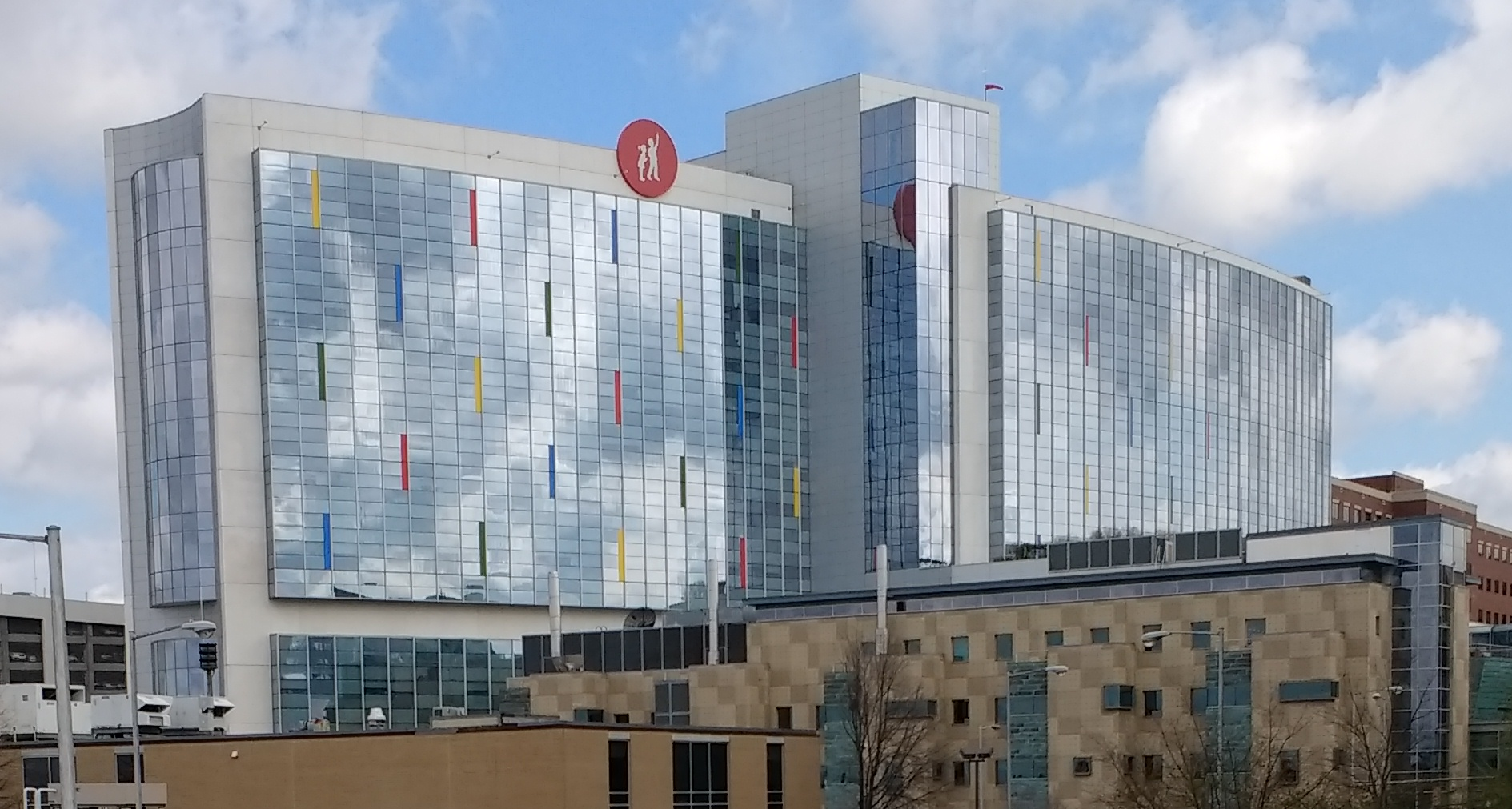
- Benjamin Russell Hospital for Children

Geography
- Location: 1600 7th Avenue South, Birmingham, Alabama, United States
- Coordinates: 33°30′20″N 86°48′22″W

Organization
- Care system: Private
- Type: Pediatric Teaching
- Affiliated university: University of Alabama at Birmingham School of Medicine

Services
- Emergency department: Level 1 Pediatric Trauma Center
- Beds: 332 Beds and 54 NICU bassinets

Helipads
- Helipad: FAA LID: AL91
Number	Length		Surface
Number	ft	m	Surface
H1	70 x 70	21 × 21	concrete
H2	80 x 80	24 × 24	aluminum

History
- Founded: 1911

Links
- Website: www.childrensal.org
- Lists: Hospitals in Alabama

Children's of Alabama is a pediatric acute care children's hospital located in Birmingham, Alabama. The main hospital has 332 beds and 54 bassinets. The hospital is affiliated with the University of Alabama at Birmingham School of Medicine. The hospital provides comprehensive pediatric specialties and subspecialties to pediatric patients aged 0–21 throughout Alabama and surrounding states. Children's of Alabama features the only level 1 pediatric trauma center in the state. The hospital was founded in 1911. The system's main hospital is located on the city's Southside, with additional outpatient facilities and primary care centers throughout central Alabama. It is the third largest children's hospital in the United States in terms of square footage.

The hospital is nationally ranked in multiple pediatric specialties.

== History ==
Pediatrics in Birmingham dates back to 1911 to Holy Innocents Hospital, a hospital that was originally sponsored by the Episcopal Diocese of Alabama. In 1914 the hospital left the diocese and was promptly renamed and refocused to just Children's Hospital.

In 1961, Children's of Alabama moved to its current day location on 7th Avenue in Birmingham that featured 100 beds. With the move, the hospital affiliated with UAB Medicine to provide educational services to students from the school and provide patient care to pediatric patients from UAB Hospital. In 1967, the hospital received a large donation from the Meyer Foundation that helped add a fifth floor and a new wing, adding another 60 beds.

In 1982 the hospital opened a new $24.5 million expansion that included an eight-story tower and parking deck to expand the capacity for the hospital.

When Hurricane Katrina first hit New Orleans in August 2005, Children's of Alabama (along with other hospitals) sent helicopters and personnel to Tulane Medical Center, Ochsner, and CHNOLA in order to help evacuate pediatric patients from the hospital.

In March 2008 plans were unveiled to invest $450 million to build a new hospital one block north of the existing campus. The new building was intended to serve as an expansion to the current buildings. The buildings expansion was planned by architectural firm HKS and designed by Giattina Aycock and construction started in 2009.

The 12-story, 760,000-square-foot building was opened on June 5, 2012, and named to the Benjamin Russell Hospital for Children to honor the $25 million donation from Benjamin Russell. The building included many amenities not seen before including a rooftop garden and private patient rooms. The campus also includes sky bridges attaching all of the children's hospital buildings together.

== About ==
The hospital has the only pediatric burn program in the state and includes an AAP verified level IV neonatal intensive care unit one of the highest in the state.

Since 1911, Children's of Alabama has provided specialized medical care for ill and injured children. Ranked among the best children's hospitals in the nation by U.S. News & World Report, Children's serves patients from every county in Alabama and nearly every state. With more than 3.5 million square feet, it is one of the largest pediatric medical facilities in the United States. Children's offers inpatient and outpatient services at its Russell Campus on Birmingham's historic Southside with additional specialty services provided at Children's South, Children's on 3rd and in Huntsville and Montgomery. Primary medical care is provided in more than a dozen communities across central Alabama. Children's is the only health system in Alabama dedicated solely to the care and treatment of children. It is a private, not-for-profit medical center that serves as the teaching hospital for the University of Alabama at Birmingham (UAB) pediatric medicine, surgery, psychiatry, research and residency programs. The medical staff consists of UAB faculty and Children's full-time physicians as well as private practicing community physicians.

=== Awards ===
As of 2021-22 Children's of Alabama has placed nationally in 9 different ranked pediatric specialties on U.S. News & World Report.

2021-22 U.S. News & World Report Rankings for Children's of Alabama
Specialty	Rank (In the U.S.)	Score (Out of 100)
Neonatology	#13	87.1
Pediatric Cancer	#27	77.9
Pediatric Cardiology & Heart Surgery	#29	76.5
Pediatric Gastroenterology & GI Surgery	#41	69.1
Pediatric Nephrology	#38	67.8
Pediatric Neurology & Neurosurgery	#33	76.3
Pediatric Orthopedics	#49	60.1
Pediatric Pulmonology & Lung Surgery	#32	74.0
Pediatric Urology	#43	52.6

== See also ==
- List of children's hospitals in the United States
- UAB Hospital
- Arkansas Children's Hospital
