= UAB Hospital =

- UAB Health System

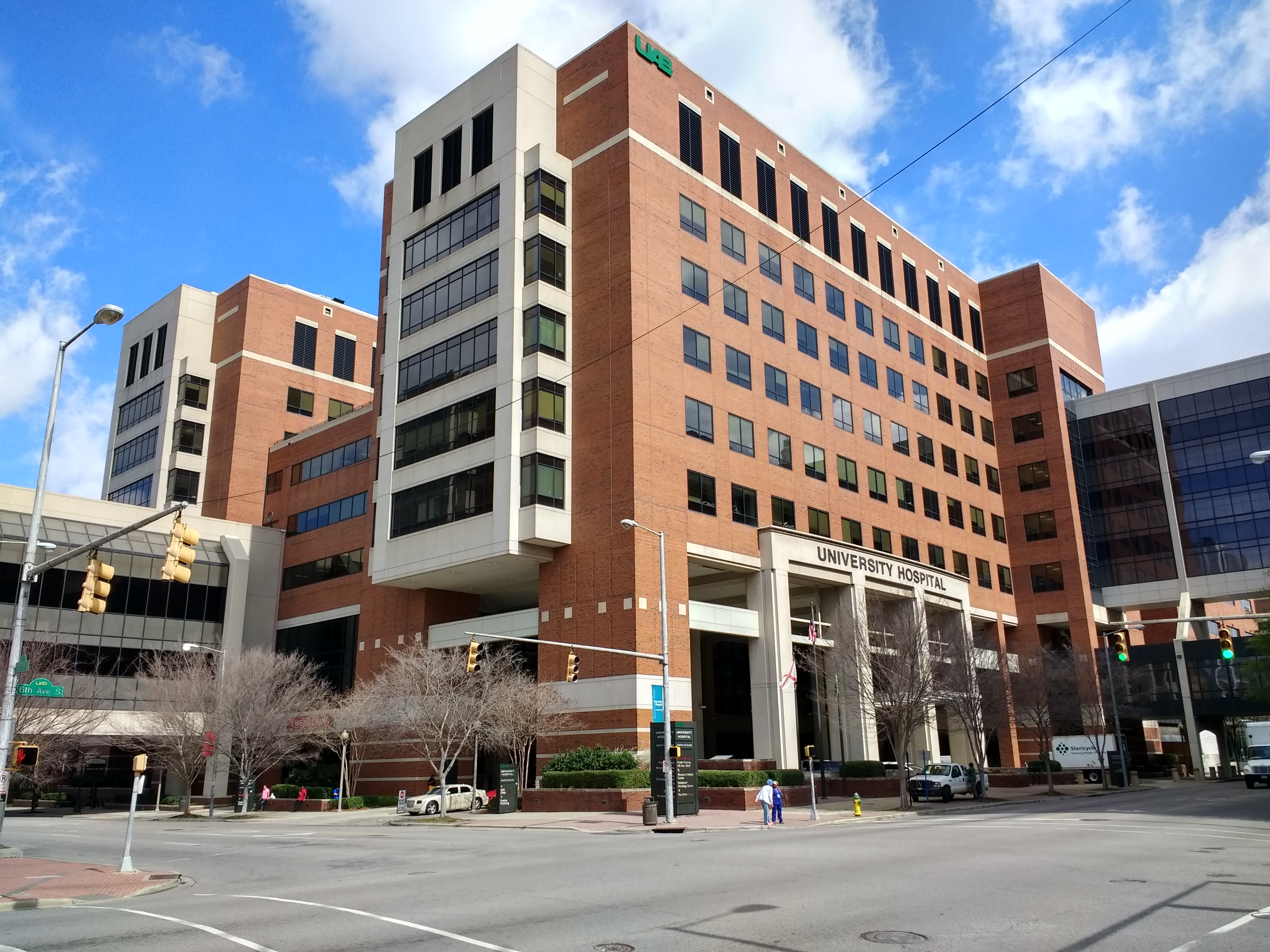
- UAB Hospital

Geography
- Location: Birmingham, Alabama, United States
- Coordinates: 33°30′24″N 86°48′11″W

Organization
- Care system: Public
- Type: Teaching
- Affiliated university: University of Alabama at Birmingham

Services
- Emergency department: Level I trauma center
- Beds: 1,207

Helipads
- Helipad: FAA LID: AL38
Number	Length		Surface
Number	ft	m	Surface
H1	60	18	aluminum rooftop

History
- Founded: 1945

Links
- Website: www.uabmedicine.org
- Lists: Hospitals in Alabama

UAB Hospital (also known as University Hospital) is a 1,207 bed tertiary hospital and academic health science center located in Birmingham, Alabama. It serves as the only ACS verified Level I Trauma Center in Alabama, and is the flagship property of the University of Alabama at Birmingham (UAB) and the UAB Health System, a part of the University of Alabama System. It includes clinics, an eye hospital and affiliations with other health care facilities throughout the state. It is Birmingham's largest employer, with a staff of over 20,000.

== Ratings ==
UAB Hospital serves as the primary teaching hospital for the UAB School of Medicine, with seven of its speciality programs ranked among the top 50 (of 5,189 hospitals) in the United States according to U.S. News & World Report in 2006. Five of the seven ranked programs were in the top 25, making UAB Hospital one of only 176 institutions nationwide studied and the only hospital in Alabama to be recognised by the magazine's "Best Hospitals" list. Its seven ranked specialties are: rheumatology (ranked 6th), cardiology and heart surgery (ranked 14th), gynaecology (ranked 14th), kidney disease (ranked 17th), oncology (ranked 23rd), and orthopaedics (ranked 47th).

In 2005–2006, 234 physicians from the University of Alabama at Birmingham Hospital were included in the list of "Best Doctors in America". The list is compiled by Best Doctors, an independent medical referral service located in Aiken, South Carolina. Best Doctors surveys peer physicians to generate a list that responds to the question "If you or a loved one needed a doctor in your specialty, to whom would you refer them?" Over 33,000 physicians from the United States were included in the list, with 345 from the Birmingham metropolitan area being featured. The surveys are highly competitive, with only 3-5 percent of all specialists worldwide being successfully listed.

In the same period of 2005–2006, UAB Hospital achieved the Consumer Choice Award of the National Research Corp (NRC). The award placed UAB among only three hospitals in the state and a total of 207 of the 3,000 hospitals in the US that hold this distinction. The award is given to institutions that receive the highest marks in terms of both quality and image from a nationwide survey of 200,000 households, representing 400,000 consumers. UAB Hospital was the sole hospital in Birmingham to be honored. The recognition placed UAB Hospital alongside such institutions as Johns Hopkins, Duke University Hospital, the Cleveland Clinic, the Mayo Clinic, and Yale-New Haven Hospital.

== History ==
The hospital was established in 1945 as the teaching hospital for the University of Alabama School of Medicine, which was moved from the University of Alabama main campus in Tuscaloosa, Alabama to Birmingham. It was originally located in the Jefferson and Hillman Hospitals, which were acquired by the University of Alabama Board of Trustees from Jefferson County. The rapid growth of the Greater Birmingham area led the hospital to continue to expand to some 20 surrounding medical buildings. In 1992, UAB opened "The Kirklin Clinic", a 5-story outpatient facility.

In November 2004, UAB Hospital opened its new 885,000-foot, 11-story building named North Pavilion. It includes 37 operating suites, two procedure rooms, three medical surgical units, four intensive care units — trauma and burn intensive care, surgical intensive care, neuroscience intensive care, and cardiovascular intensive care, and a 38,000-square-foot (3,500 m^{2}) emergency department. Its emergency department is located on the first floor, along with the large public lobby and front door. The second floor serves as the main concourse into the UAB Hospital complex with its primary entrance on 4th Avenue South. The new hospital is equipped with state-of-the-art digital and wireless technology. Operating rooms contain voice-activated video technology allowing the surgeon to view x-rays, ECGs or pathology specimens without having to break scrub or leave the room.

In February 2010, a new Women and Infant's Center was completed and opened, adjacent to the new Children's of Alabama Russell Campus hospital.
