= Germantown Colony and Museum =

Museum in Louisiana, U.S.

- Germantown
- U.S. National Register of Historic Places
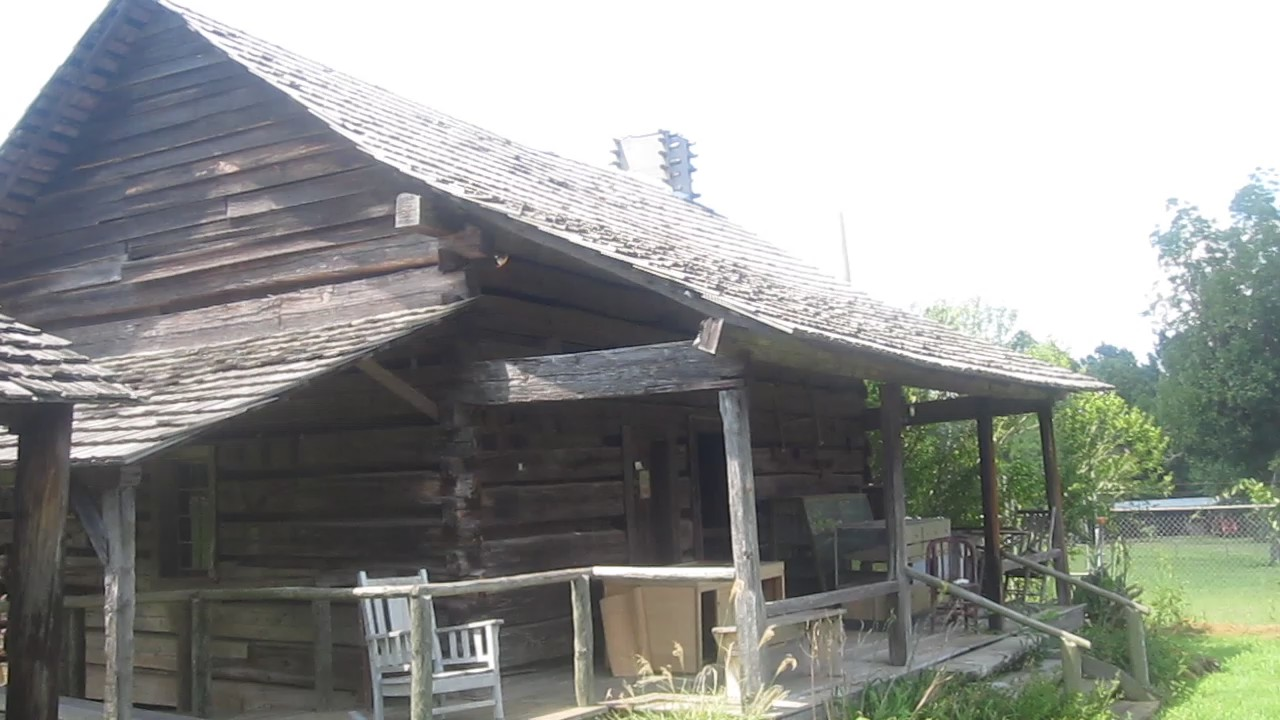
- Countess Leon's House at Germantown Colony

- Location within Louisiana Location within the United States
- Location: Off U.S. 79, Webster Parish, Louisiana, seven miles northeast of Minden, Louisiana
- Coordinates: 32°42′0″N 93°13′50″W
- Area: 1 acre (0.40 ha)
- Built: 1835
- NRHP reference No.: 79001100
- Added to NRHP: March 12, 1979

The Germantown Colony and Museum is a museum and historical preservation project in Webster Parish, Louisiana about 7 miles (11 km) north of Minden in northwestern Louisiana, USA. It was listed on the National Register of Historic Places as Germantown in 1979.

Germantown was the earliest religious communal settlement in Louisiana. It was founded in 1836 by Germans, adherents to ideas of religious leader Maximilian Ludwig (1788–1834), the "Count of Leon", and it lasted as a commune until 1871. Its founding was led by Elisa Leon (d.1881), the "Countess of Leon", widow of Maximilian Ludwig. In the colony, all property was owned in common and observance of religious principles was required. Though the colony was not very large, only about thirty-five people, it worked together and prospered. Its pacificism and general privation contributed to hardship during the American Civil War which contributed to its ending.

Germantown once had numerous houses, barns, stores, and shops, as well as a kitchen-dining hall and a "bachelor's hall". The historic buildings are mostly gone; the listing included just two contributing buildings: Countess Leon's home and the kitchen-dining hall, both built of hewn logs with dovetailing at their corners. The kitchen-dining hall has a dry wall stone cellar and an adjacent frame shack. Many windows have been replaced, and none of the porches are original. These surviving historic buildings, and sympathetic rustic others, still "convey in their crude and primitive character something of the life style of the Germantown settlers."

The site also includes a barn and other buildings deemed non-contributing, a log cabin which includes a bathroom, and a well.

In 2022 the site, several miles off U.S. 79 and about nine miles north of Interstate 20, continues to be operated as a museum.

== Gallery ==
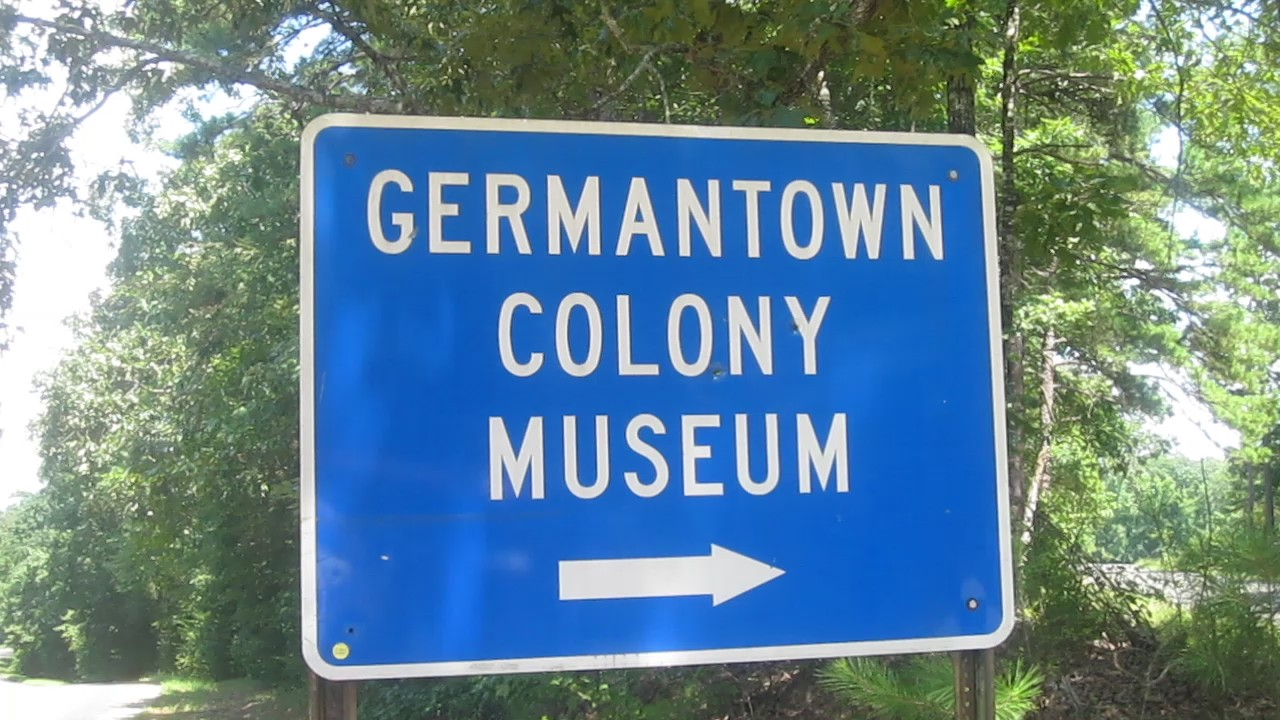
Germantown Colony Museum sign in Webster Parish, Louisiana

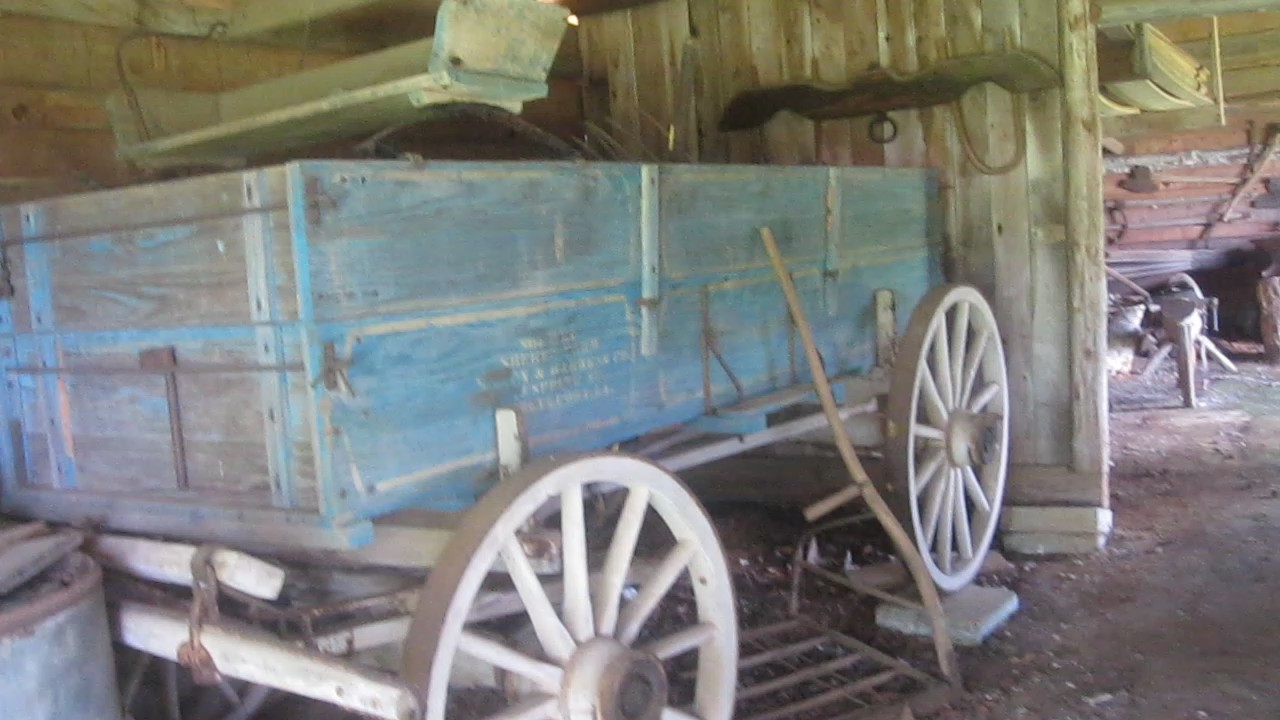
Wagon in blacksmith shop at Germantown Museum

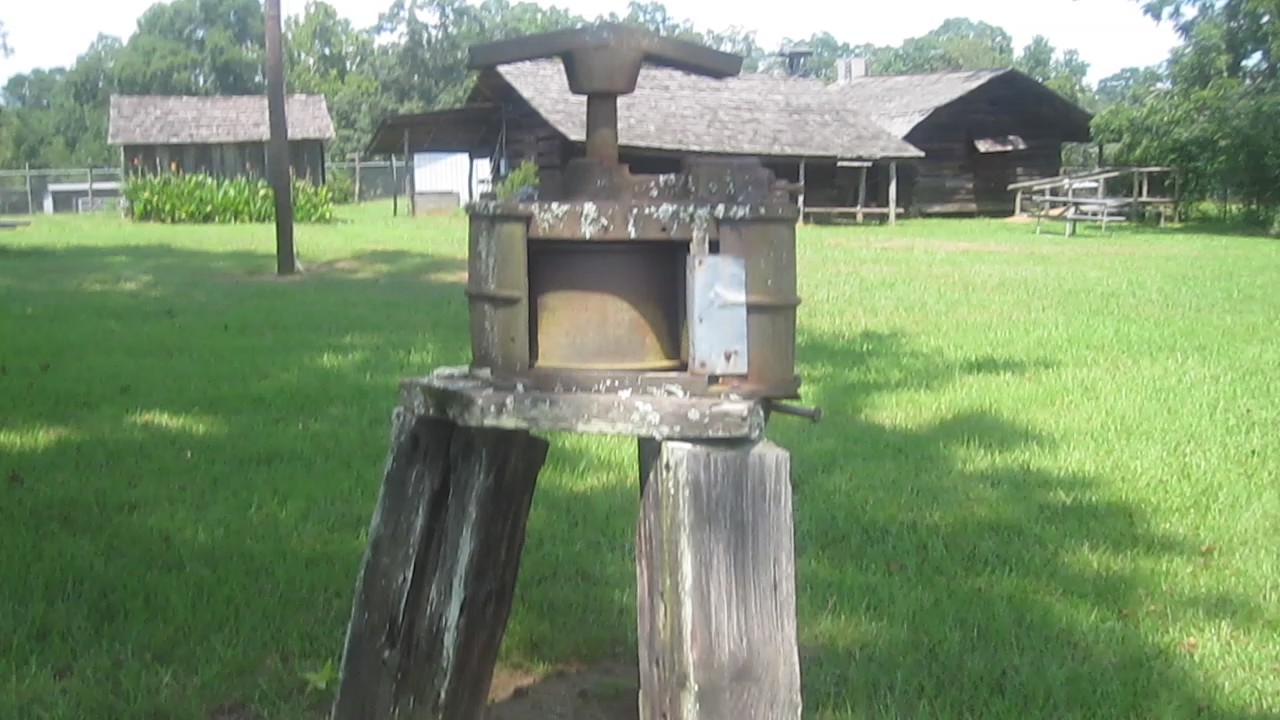
Sugar cane press at Germantown

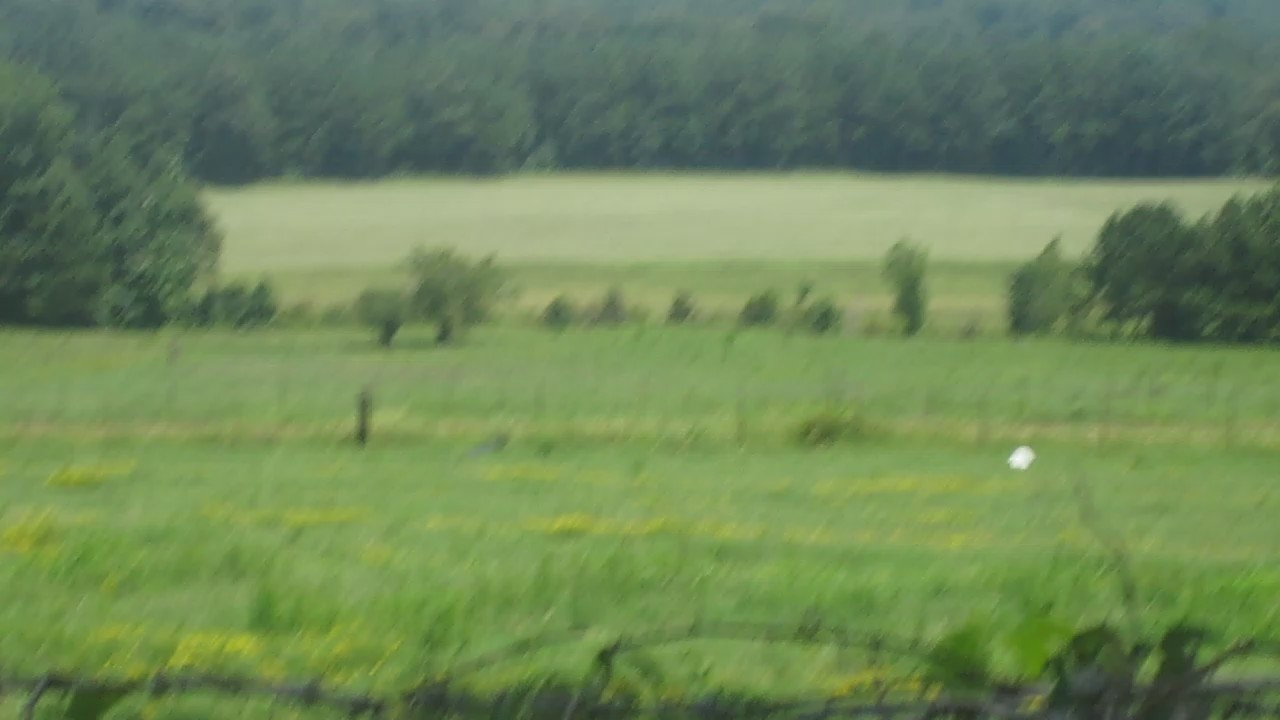
Open field at Germantown
