= Ashford station (Alabama) =

- Alabama Midland Railway Depot
- U.S. National Register of Historic Places
- Alabama Register of Landmarks and Heritage
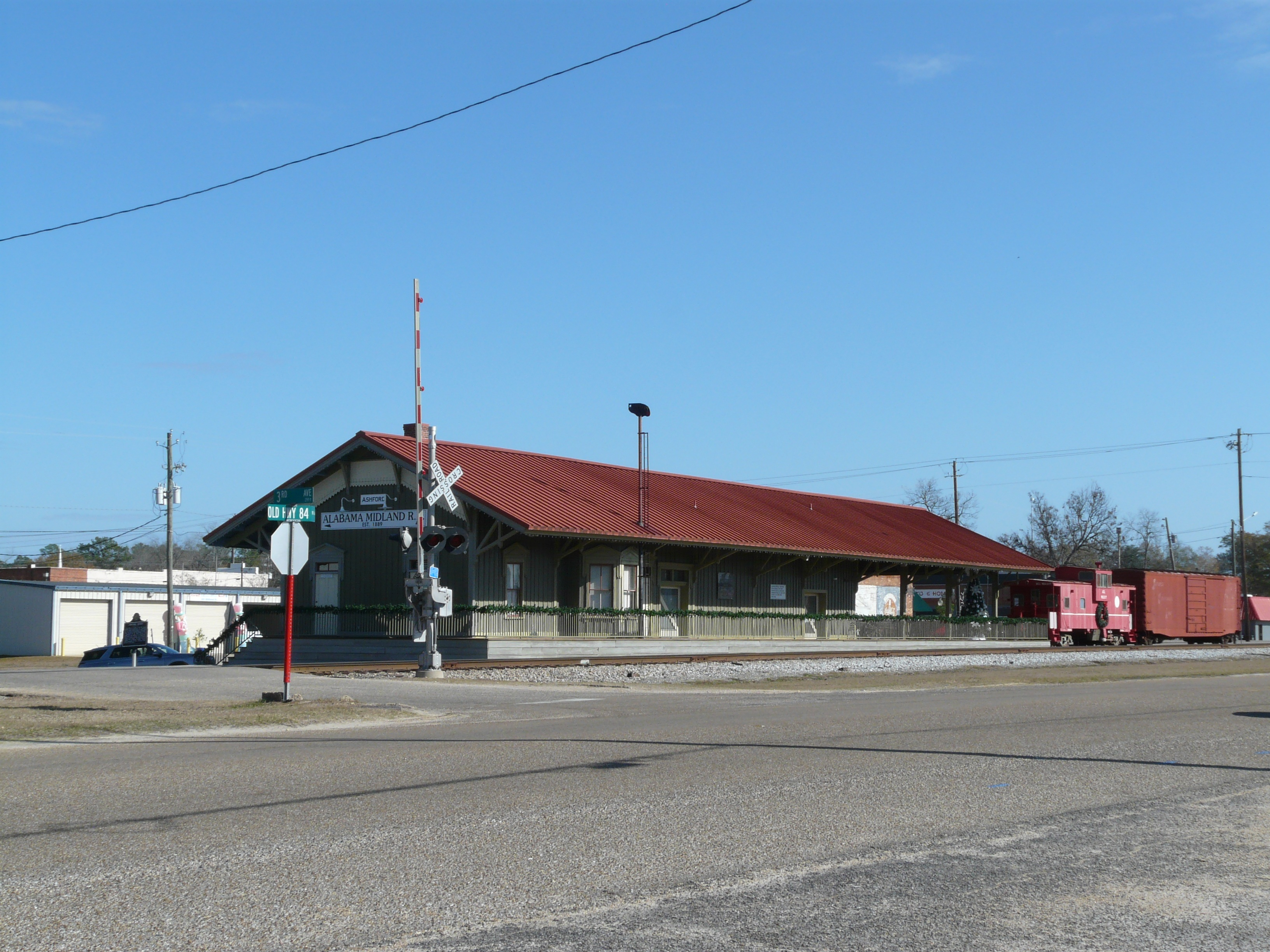
- The depot in 2025

- Location within Alabama Location within the United States
- Location: Midland St., Ashford, Alabama
- Coordinates: 31°10′58″N 85°14′15″W
- Area: 0.1 acres (0.040 ha)
- Built: 1892
- Architectural style: Gothic
- NRHP reference No.: 85002163

Significant dates
- Added to NRHP: September 12, 1985
- Designated ARLH: January 25, 1977

The Alabama Midland Railway Depot (also known as the Ashford Depot) is a historic train station in Ashford, Alabama, United States. Ashford was founded in 1891 along the Alabama Midland Railway line between Montgomery and Bainbridge, Georgia. The depot was built the next year, and served as the commercial hub of the town. The Alabama Midland became part of the Plant System is 1894, which was taken over by the Atlantic Coast Line Railroad in 1901 and merged into the Seaboard Coast Line Railroad in 1967. Nearly all of the downtown area was destroyed in a fire in 1915, but the depot survived. The depot closed in 1978, and was renovated as an event space in 2005.

The depot is built of Yellow pine, and sided with 8-inch (20-cm) boards separated by 3-inch (8-cm) slats. The gable roof has wide eaves with stick style brackets. The track-facing side of the building has a projecting bay with three pedimented windows with transoms. Adjacent to the bay is the main entrance, also with transom and pediment, and the main warehouse door. Separate entrances to the two waiting rooms sit in the west gable end; each door has a transom and pediment similar to the main entrance, although all original doors have been replaced. Above these entrances is a panel of gingerbread woodwork, pointed boards with crosses. The eastern end is an open shed area, however it was enclosed from the 1930s until the 2000s, originally for use as a produce warehouse.

The depot was listed on the Alabama Register of Landmarks and Heritage in 1977 and the National Register of Historic Places in 1985.

Preceding station	Atlantic Coast Line Railroad	Following station
Cowart toward Montgomery	Montgomery – Waycross	Gordon toward Waycross
