= Howell School =

- U.S. National Register of Historic Places
- Location within Alabama Location within the United States
- Location: 408 E. Newton St., Dothan, Alabama
- Coordinates: 31°13′43″N 85°23′18″W
- Built: 1902
- Architect: J. W. Baughman
- Architectural style: Late Victorian
- NRHP reference No.: 13000406
- Added to NRHP: June 26, 2013

Howell School is a historic school building in Dothan, Alabama, United States. The school was built in 1902 to replace the previous grammar school that had burned down in 1901. It was named in 1916 for the recently deceased Robert Graves Howell, who was mayor when the first grammar school was built. A second school was built in 1911, and Howell was replaced by Minnie T. Heard Elementary School in 1942. After being used by the Salvation Army during World War II, the building was converted for use as a textile mill in 1947. A number of companies operated out of the building until 1952, when the Dothan Manufacturing Company took over the property. A one-story addition was constructed on the front of the building in 1965, obscuring the façade. The plant closed in 1997, and was sold to the Southern Alabama Regional Council on the Aging in 2003, before the city re-acquired it in 2008.

The building combines Romanesque Revival and Renaissance Revival styles. The front façade originally had a mansard roofed tower, which was later removed. The outer three bays as well as the center bay project slightly, and are separated by pilasters with Corinthian terra cotta capitals. The entablature contains a plain architrave and frieze separated by a terra cotta band, and a pressed metal cornice with modillions. On the main façade, two dormers project from the hipped roof, while gabled dormers with round vents pierce the roof on the ends. A wing projects from the center of the rear of the building. All second floor window openings, as well as the multi-story windows on the wing, are arched with terra cotta hoodmolds.

The school was listed on the National Register of Historic Places in 2013.

== Redevelopment ==
Joseph (Joe) Donofro, Dothan, Alabama local and lead architect of Donofro Architects, had been constructing the idea of renovating Howell School since stumbling upon the building originally in 1978. After garnering support from the city and its former mayor, Mike Schmidtz, Joe championed the redevelopment and conversion of Howell School into a 55-unit senior, affordable housing development.

Donofro's dedication to the project also led him to contact Dothan native, Rob Coats, to act as the developer for the project. Despite Coats’ initial hesitation, the rallying of crucial development players and Donofro's determination led Coats and his organization, The Banyan Foundation, Inc., to take on the $14.1 million project, in conjunction with co-developer, and Dothan native, Chase Northcutt of Resource Housing Group, Inc.

The transformation of Howell School did not occur without challenge, however. Destruction from Hurricane Michael and the rapid outbreak of COVID-19 caused concern regarding the completion of the project. Despite these unforeseen circumstances, the dedication to transform Howell School by Donofro, the Development Team and the City of Dothan led all parties to continue onward unto completion.

Howell School Apartments officially opened in March 2020. All 55 units of the development are occupied at this time. A grand opening occurred for the property in October 2020.
