= Water Works Standpipe =

- U.S. National Register of Historic Places
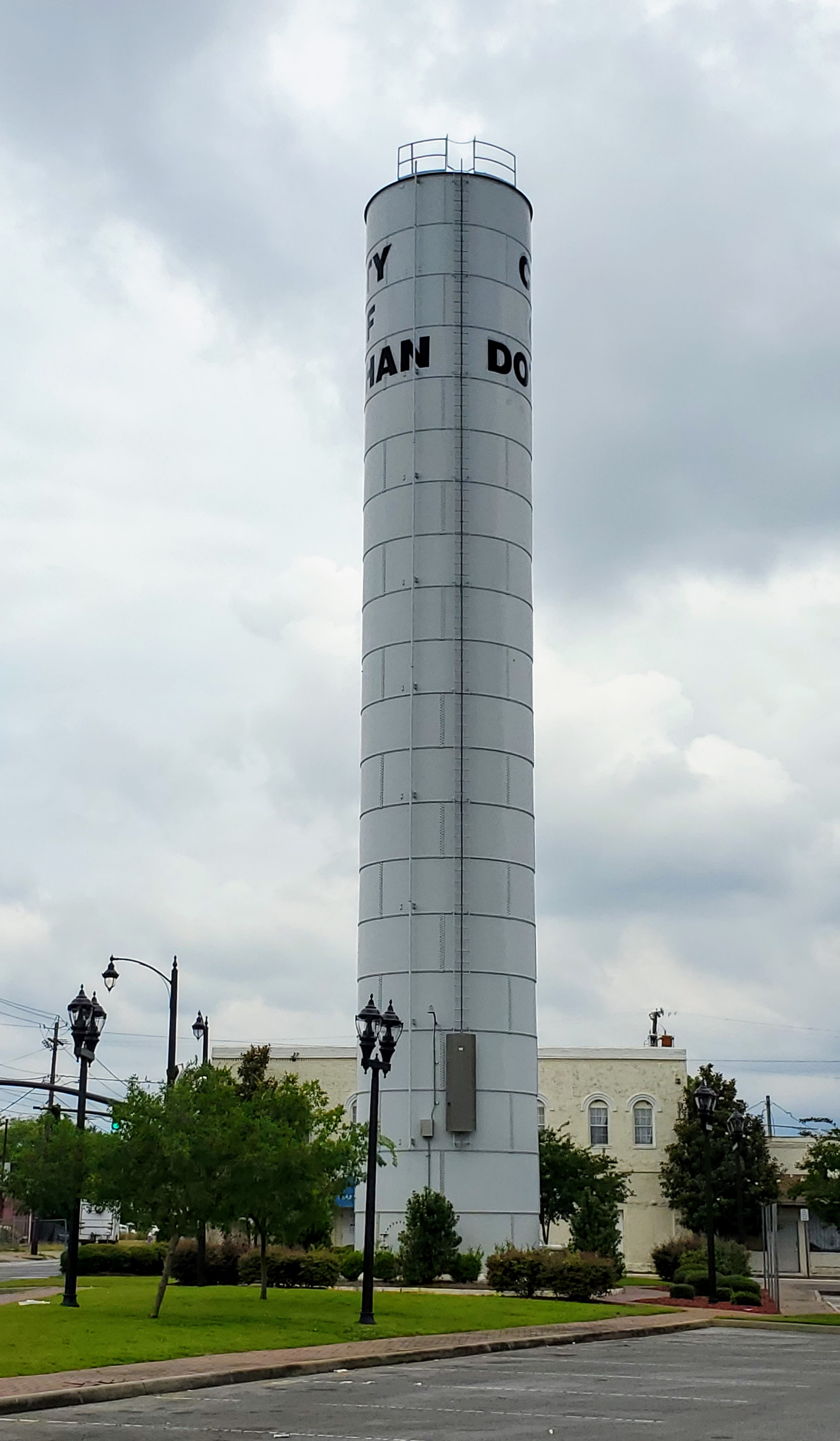

- Location within Alabama
- Location: Intersection of East Powell and North Saint Andrews St., .5 mi. north of Main St., Dothan, Alabama
- Coordinates: 31°13′49″N 85°23′31″W
- Area: less than one acre
- Built: 1897
- Built by: _Guild & White
- Engineer: R. T. Ghent
- NRHP reference No.: 16000835
- Added to NRHP: December 13, 2016

The Water Works Standpipe in Dothan, Alabama, United States, was listed on the National Register of Historic Places in 2016.

It is a standpipe-style water tower built in 1897.

It is located on a triangular property now known as "Dixie Park", at the intersection of East Powell and North Saint Andrews St., .5 miles (0.80 km) north of Main St. in the Houston County portion of Dothan.

The well driller was C.A. Ray, the builder of the standpipe was Guild & White, and the engineer was R. T. Ghent.
