= Purcell–Killingsworth House =

Historic house in Alabama, United States

- U.S. National Register of Historic Places
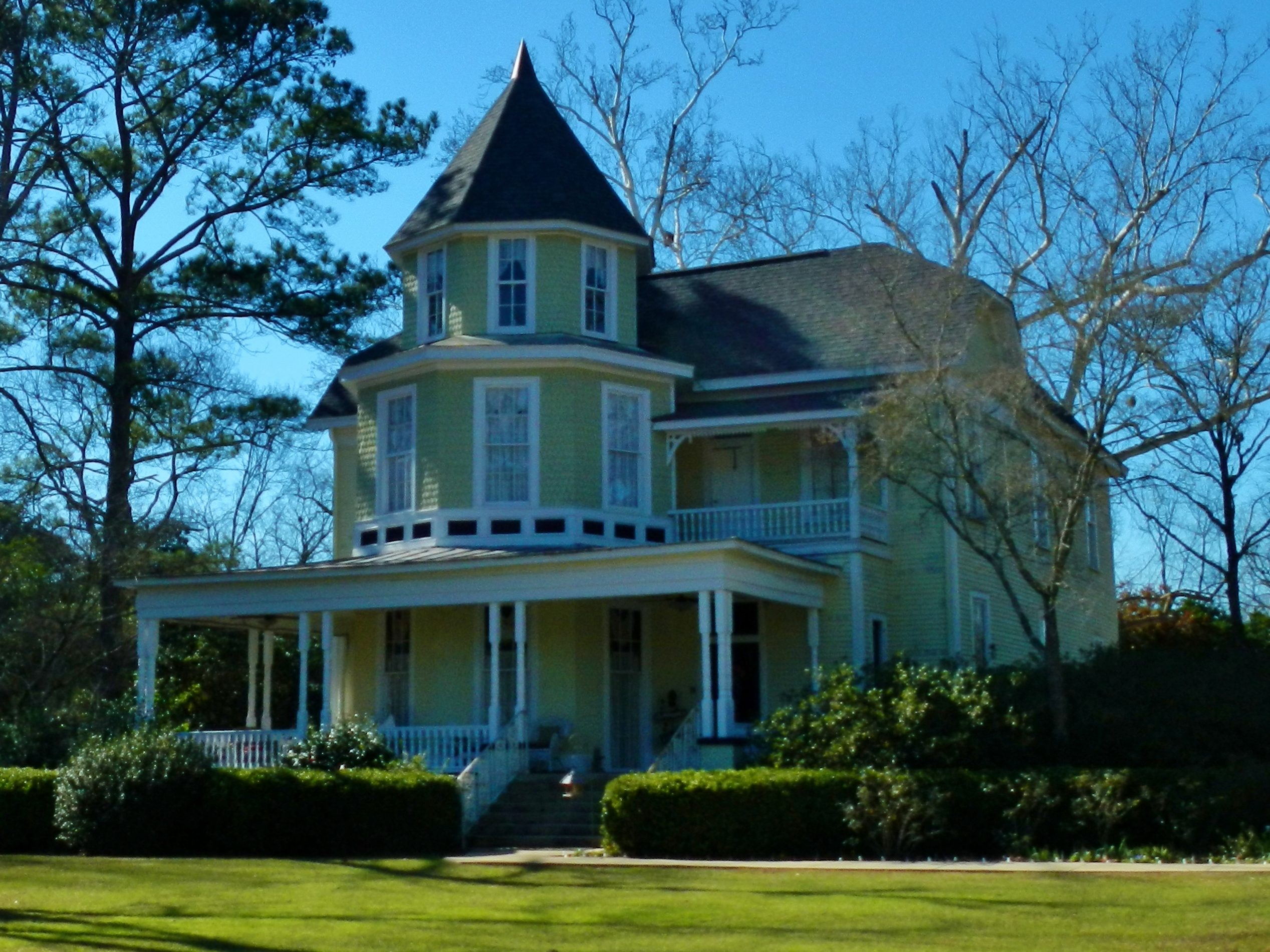

- Location within Alabama Location within the United States
- Location: Main St., Columbia, Alabama
- Coordinates: 31°17′49″N 85°6′40″W
- Area: 2 acres (0.81 ha)
- Built: 1889
- Architectural style: Queen Anne
- NRHP reference No.: 82001616
- Added to NRHP: December 16, 1982

The Purcell–Killingsworth House, now the Garden Path Inn bed and breakfast, is a historic residence in Columbia, Alabama, United States. Also known as Traveler's Rest, it was completed in 1890 by William Henry Purcell (1845–1910), a prominent Columbia businessman and politician. Purcell's business interests included a steamboat landing on the Chattahoochee River. The bed and breakfast has three guestrooms.

The Purcell House was also the boyhood home of Bishop Clare Purcell (1884–1964). In 1955 he was elected President of the Council of Bishops, the highest place of recognition ever achieved by a native-born Alabama Methodist minister.

In 1946, the Purcell family sold the two acre homestead to Mr. and Mrs. Henry Killingsworth, who restored the Victorian mansion. It was added to the National Register of Historic Places on December 16, 1982. It is located on Main Street.
