= Moody Hospital =

Former hospital in Dothan, Alabama

- U.S. National Register of Historic Places
- Interactive map of Moody Hospital
- Location: 311 North Alice St., Dothan, Alabama
- Coordinates: 31°13′38″N 85°23′50″W
- Built: 1916
- NRHP reference No.: 100007191
- Added to NRHP: December 2, 2021

Moody Hospital is a historic hospital building in Dothan, Alabama, United States. Built in 1916, it was listed on the National Register of Historic Places in 2021.

== History ==
The hospital was built in 1916 by Dr. Earle Farley Moody and Dr. Charles Wesley Hilliard on the site of a smaller clinic they had opened in 1912. A segregated cottage for Black patients was also constructed, but no longer exists. In 1922, a twenty-room addition was completed, which replaced the 1912 clinic. A third addition was completed in 1929. The hospital also operated as a nursing training school until 1952, the year Dr. Moody died. The hospital was taken over by Moody's son-in-law, Dr. Arthur Mazyck, until it closed in 1965 amid competition from larger public hospitals. The building was acquired by an architecture firm in 1973 for use as offices. It has been vacant since the mid-2000s.

== Architecture ==
The building is a two-and-a-half story frame structure. The façade is ten bays wide, with brick veneer on the lower two floors and a tile mansard roof enclosing the third floor. Concrete-arched openings sit at both corners of the building. The original three-bay central block is an L-shaped structure, while the four-bay 1922 addition sits to the right (north) and the three-bay 1929 addition is to the left (south). The main entrance is covered by a shallow porch supported by Tuscan columns. The double doors have a fanlight and sidelights. The interior plan has a central hall with stairway, and long halls in each direction, with access to rooms of various sizes. A larger operating room with additional windows is on the third floor at the end of the 1922 addition; this replaced an operating room in the original block which has a skylight.
