= St. Vincent's Health System =

Health care system in Alabama, United States

Coordinates: 33°30′30.21″N 86°47′22.35″W

- Type: Private
- Industry: Healthcare
- Founded: 1898; 128 years ago
- Headquarters: Birmingham, Alabama, U.S.
- Area served: United States
- Services: Hospital management
- Number of employees: 4,700 (2009)
- Parent: Ascension Health
- Divisions: St. Vincent's Birmingham; St. Vincent's Blount; St. Vincent's Chilton; St. Vincent's East; St. Vincent's St. Clair; St. Vincent's One Nineteen
- Website: www.stvhs.com

St. Vincent's Health System, based in Birmingham, Alabama, United States is an operator of acute care hospitals located in the Birmingham area and a health ministry of Ascension Health. St. Vincent's Health System is made up of six facilities: St. Vincent's Birmingham, St. Vincent's Blount, St. Vincent's Chilton, St. Vincent's East, St. Vincent's St. Clair, and St. Vincent's One Nineteen. The company employs over 4,700 people throughout its six facilities.

== History ==
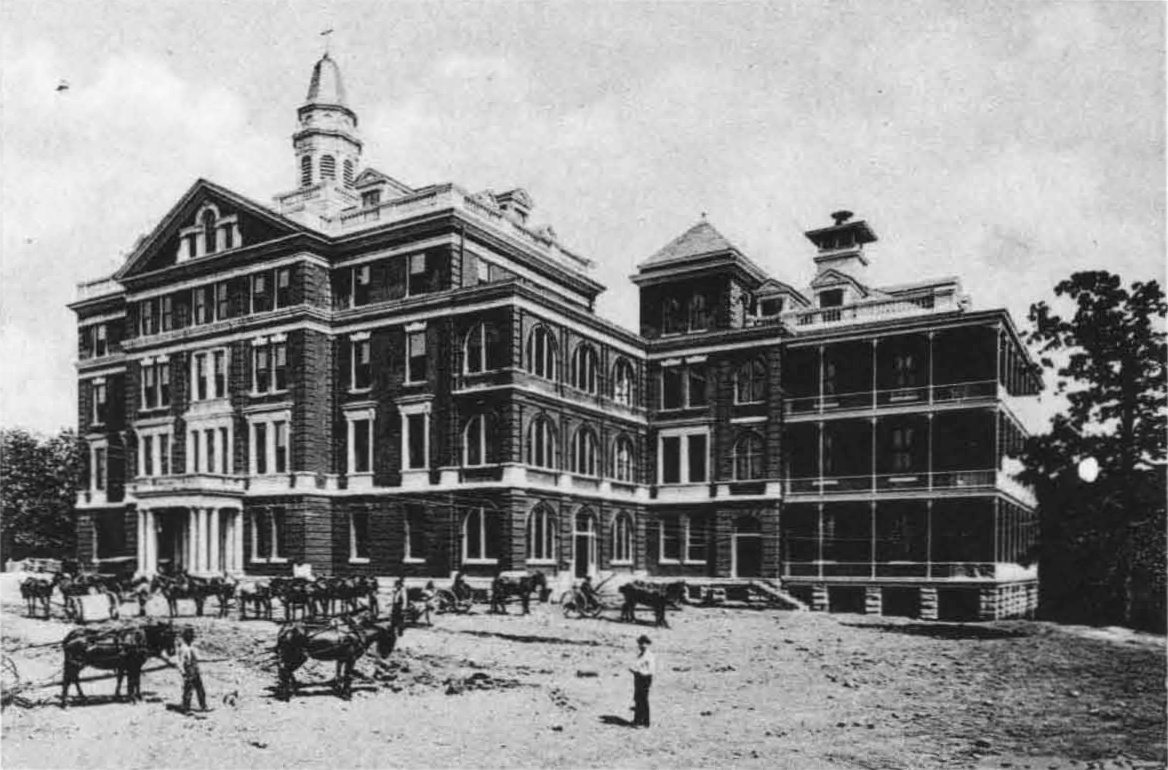
St. Vincent's Hospital, circa 1903

St. Vincent's Hospital (now St. Vincent's Birmingham) was founded in 1898 and is Birmingham's oldest hospital. It was founded by the Daughters of Charity and named after the 17th century Parisian St. Vincent de Paul, who started the Daughters of Charity in 1633.

In 1999, it was part of the founding of Ascension Health.

In July 2007, St. Vincent's Hospital merged with Eastern Health System to become St. Vincent's Health System.

In 2017, its hospitals' names were changed to Ascension St. Vincent, along with Providence Hospitals.

In June 2024, UAB Health System announced it will purchase Ascension St. Vincent's Health System for $450 million.

== Facilities ==
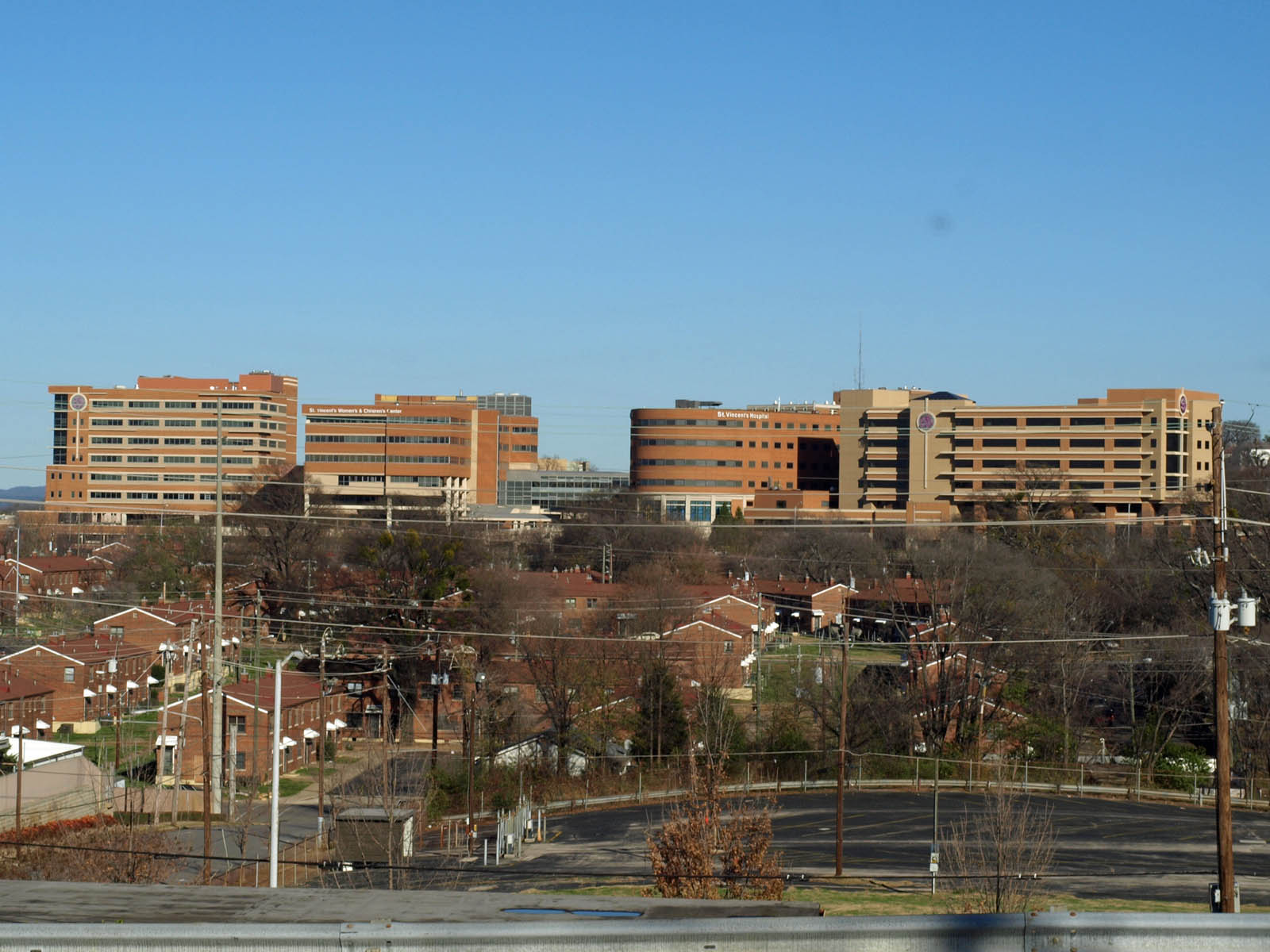
St. Vincent's Birmingham campus

- St. Vincent's Birmingham
- St. Vincent's Blount
- St. Vincent's East
- St. Vincent's St. Clair
- St. Vincent's One Nineteen
- St. Vincent's Chilton
