= United States Marine Hospital (Mobile, Alabama) =

- U.S. National Register of Historic Places
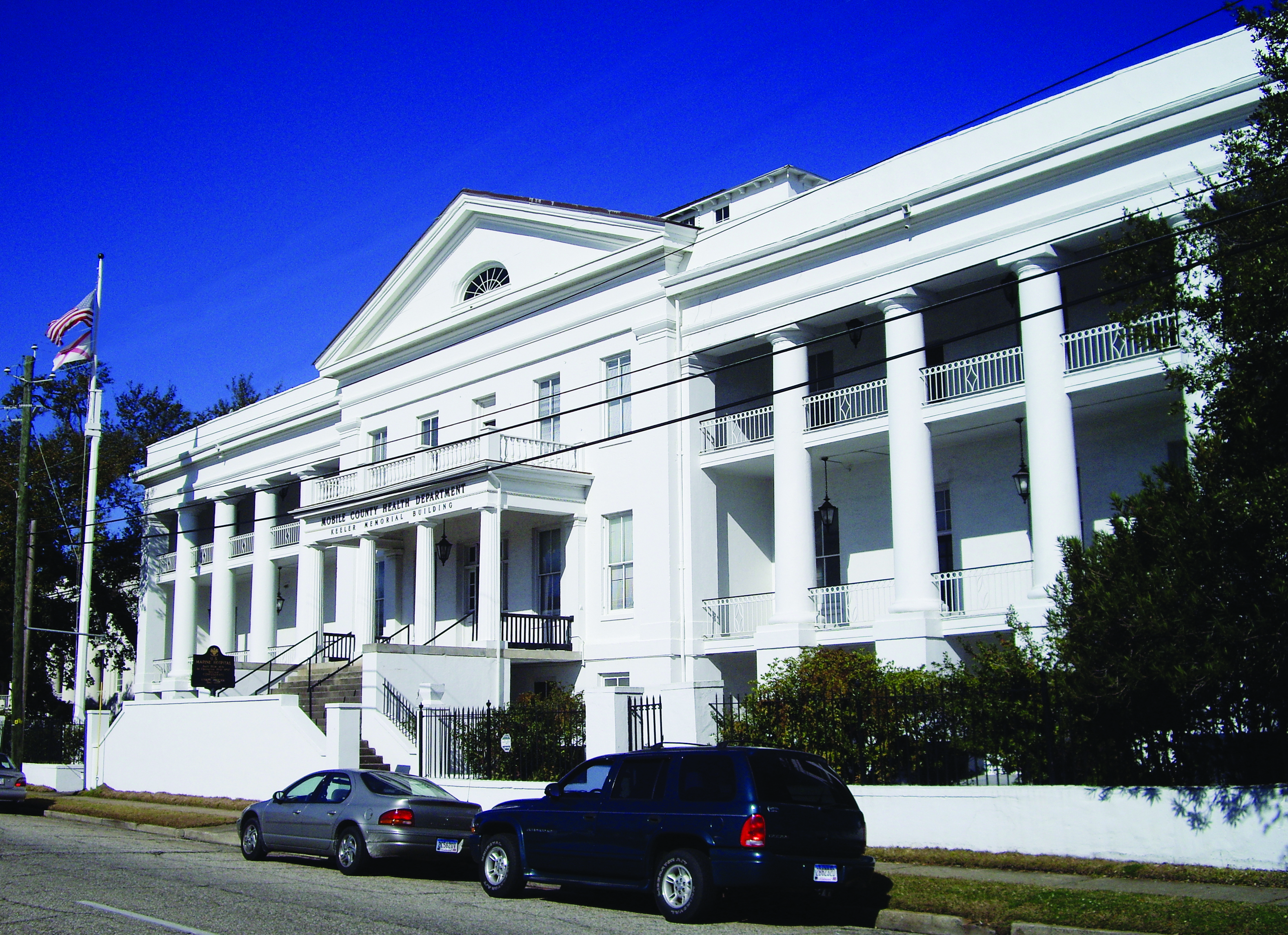
- The former U.S. Marine Hospital in 2009
- Interactive map of United States Marine Hospital
- Location: 800 St. Anthony Street; Mobile, Alabama
- Coordinates: 30°41′29.24″N 88°3′17.06″W
- Built: 1842
- Architect: Bunnell, Frederick
- Architectural style: Greek Revival
- NRHP reference No.: 74000428
- Added to NRHP: June 27, 1974

The United States Marine Hospital, formerly known as Frank S. Keeler Memorial Hospital, is a historic Greek Revival hospital building in Mobile, Alabama, United States. Construction began in 1838 and was completed in 1842. It was designed by architect Frederick Bunnell and was operated by the Marine Hospital Service from its opening until it closed, in 1952. It treated injured Confederate and Union soldiers during the American Civil War. It shares some design features, such as its two-story colonnades, with its neighbor, the old Mobile City Hospital.

The building was added to the National Register of Historic Places on June 27, 1974. The Mobile County Board of Health acquired the title to the property from the Tuberculosis Association on October 23, 1975. By 1983 the board had created an adjoining new structure to the rear of the main structure and restored the historic building. The facility was rededicated as the Major General William C. Gorgas Clinic in 1984.

== Timeline ==
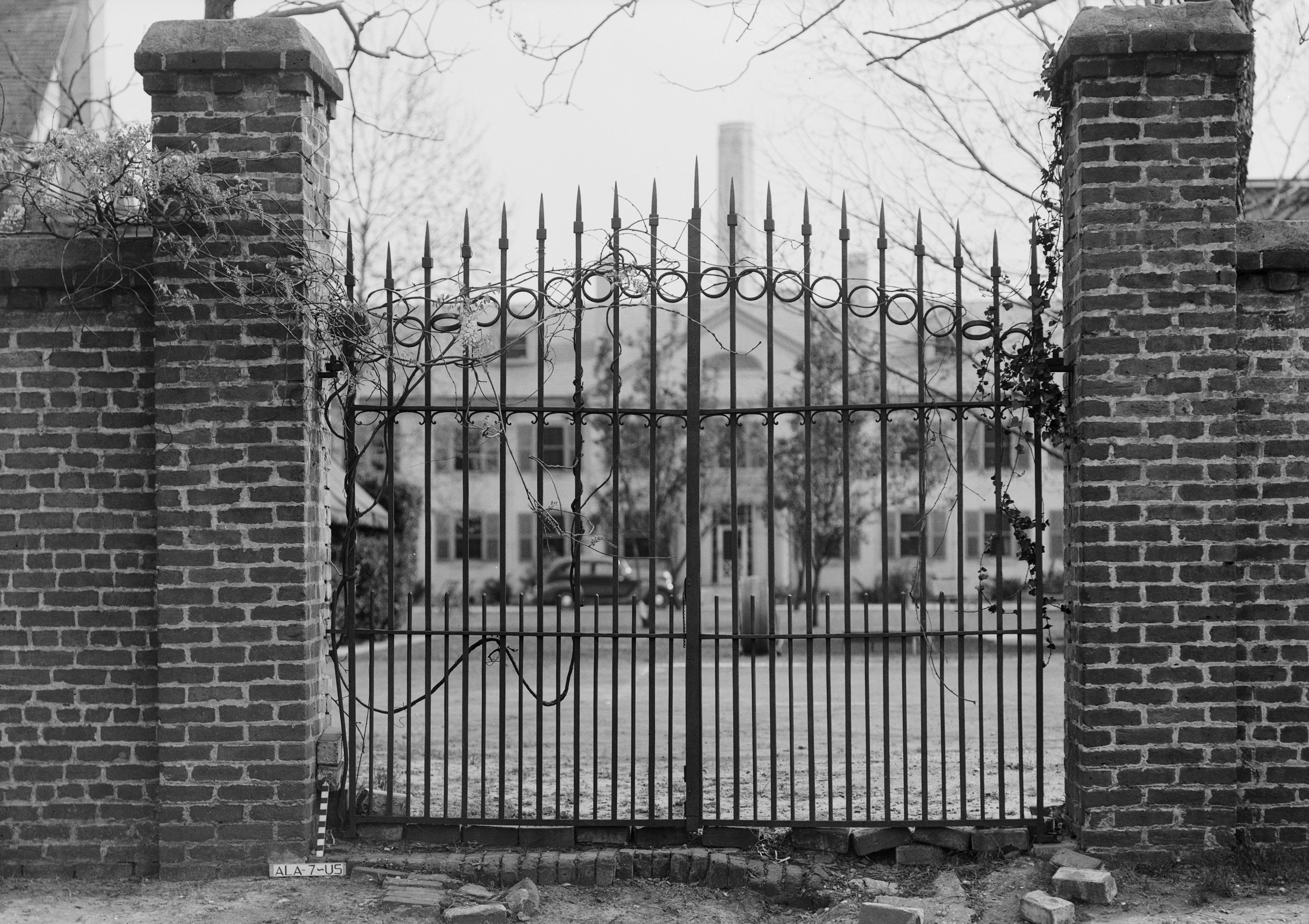
Gate leading to rear of hospital in 1936

- 1798 - U.S. Congress created a Marine Hospital Service to provide for the care of sick and disabled seamen.
- 1817 - Marine Hospital built in Mobile on Government Street at Marine Street.
- 1836 - Marine Hospital destroyed by fire.
- 1838 - Land acquired for construction of new Marine Hospital at 800 St. Anthony Street next to newly constructed City Hospital.
- 1861-65 - Marine Hospital served at different times as a military hospital for Confederate and Union troops.
- 1870 - Hospital ceased to serve as a military hospital and returned to former status as the Marine Hospital.
- 1872 - Marine Hospital leased to private party. A report dated 1872 stated, "The building is old and unworthy of any considerable outlay for repairs."
- 1876 - Marine Hospital reverted to being a public institution.
- 1901 - Electric lights and plumbing installed.
- 1902 - Name changed to U.S. Public Health and Marine Service Hospital.
- 1912 - Facility served as first headquarters for malaria investigations by the U.S. Public Health Service.
- 1914 - Hospital served soldiers and sailors during World War I in addition to serving as a public health service.
- 1915 - First female nurse, Miss Ruby Gordon, reported to duty. Previously, only male nurses had been employed.
- 1932 - Three-story, T-shaped building added to rear of existing building, which approximately doubled the space in the hospital.
- 1953 - Sixth District Tuberculosis Association met to plan the acquisition of the hospital for use as a tuberculosis hospital. Frank S. Keeler was elected president of the association.
- 1955 - The U.S. government transferred the hospital to the Sixth District Tuberculosis Association for use as a tuberculosis hospital.
- 1973 - The Sixth District Tuberculosis Hospital was renamed the Frank S. Keeler Memorial Hospital in honor of his work in obtaining the Public Health Service Hospital for use as a tuberculosis sanatorium.
- 1974 - The Frank S. Keeler Tuberculosis Hospital closed on July 1, and the hospital was listed in the National Register of Historic Places on July 9.
- 1975 - The Mobile County Health Department purchased the Frank S. Keeler Memorial Building and surrounding property.
