= Mobile City Hospital =

- U.S. National Register of Historic Places
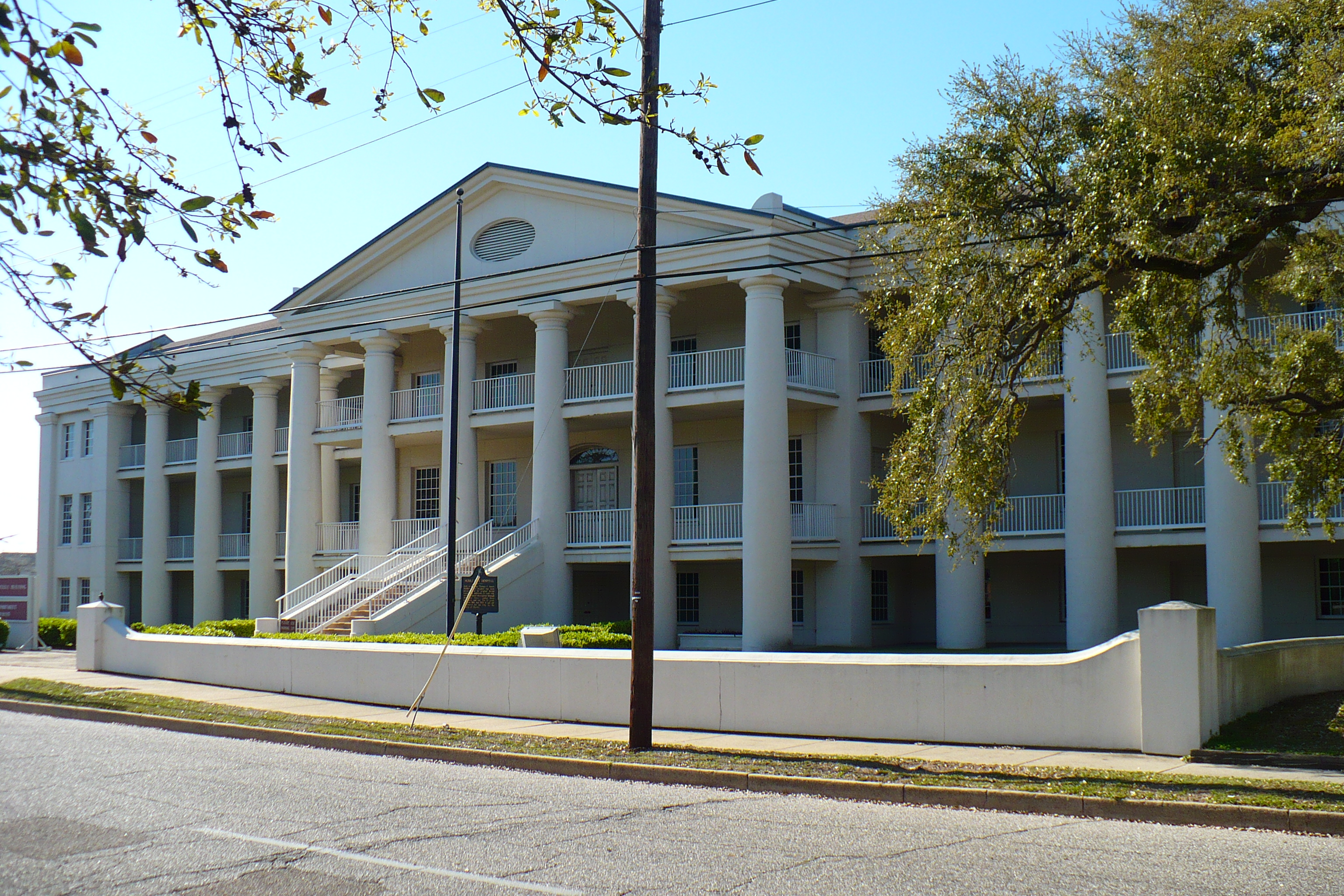
- The former Mobile City Hospital in 2008.

- Location within Mobile, Alabama Location within Alabama Location within the United States
- Location: 900–950 St. Anthony Street; Mobile, Alabama
- Coordinates: 30°41′28.37″N 88°3′20.03″W
- Built: 1830
- Architectural style: Greek Revival
- NRHP reference No.: 70000108
- Added to NRHP: February 26, 1970

Mobile City Hospital, also known as Old Mobile General Hospital, is a historic Greek Revival hospital building in Mobile, Alabama, United States. It was built in 1830 by Thomas S. James and served as a hospital for the city of Mobile from 1831 until 1966. It was administered for the city by the Sisters of Charity throughout a large part of its history.

Residents of Mobile were treated here during epidemics of yellow fever and during the American Civil War. It was converted to office space after 1966. It was added to the National Register of Historic Places on February 26, 1970. The building is adjacent to the old U.S. Marine Hospital, which is also on the National Register.

In 1966, a replacement hospital was opened as Mobile General Hospital. It was sold to the University of South Alabama for $1 in 1970, and later renamed USA Medical Center. It exists today as USA Health University Hospital, the area's only level 1 trauma center and the main teaching hospital for the University of South Alabama's College of Medicine.

== Description ==
The building is stuccoed brick, with two stories over a raised basement. It features a long colonnaded front facade with a central projecting hexastyle portico supported by full height Doric columns carrying a full entablature and parapet across the front of the building. The rooms open onto two levels of galleries behind the colonnade.
