= Megginson =

Megginson is a surname. Notable people with the name include:

- David Megginson (born 1964), Canadian computer consultant
- Kate Megginson (born 2003), Canadian actress
- Leon C. Megginson (1921–2010), American business academic
- Mitchel Megginson (born 1992), Scottish footballer
- Robert Megginson (born 1948), American mathematician
- William L. Megginson, American economist, son of Leon C. Megginson

== See also ==
- Ernest Megginson House, historic home in Alabama
