= Mid-Town Historic District =

Mid-Town Historic District or Midtown Historic District may refer to:

(by US state)

- Midtown Historic District (Mobile, Alabama), listed on the National Register of Historic Places (NRHP)
- Midtown Historic District (Atlanta, Georgia), NRHP-listed
- Midtown Woodward Historic District, Detroit, Michigan, NRHP-listed
- Midtown Corinth Historic District, Corinth, Mississippi, NRHP-listed
- Mid-Town Historic District (Meridian, Mississippi), NRHP-listed
- Midtown Historic District (St. Louis, Missouri), NRHP-listed
- Mid-Town Historic District (Springfield, Missouri), NRHP-listed
- Mid-Town Historic District (Elizabeth, New Jersey), NRHP-listed
- Midtown Harrisburg Historic District, Harrisburg, Pennsylvania, NRHP-listed
