= Barth's building =

Historic building in Springfield, Missouri

- History Museum on the Square
- U.S. Historic district – Contributing property
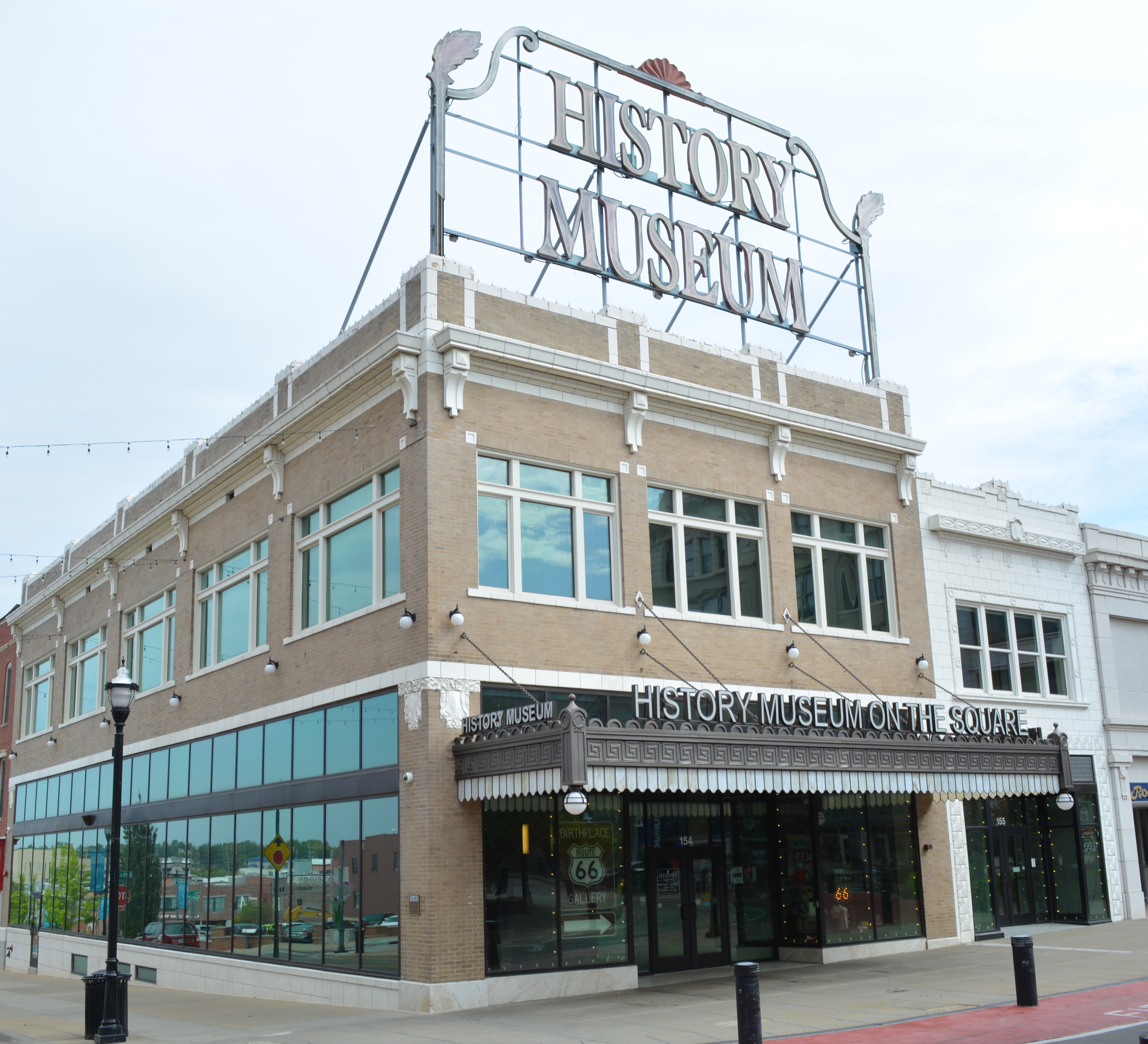
- Formerly the Barth's Building, now housing the History Museum on the Square in Springfield, MO. (ca. 2025)
- Location: 331 Park Central E. Springfield, Missouri
- Coordinates: 37°12′35″N 93°17′32″W
- Built: 1915
- Part of: Springfield Public Square Historic District (ID06000331)

The Barth's Building is a restored historic commercial building located in Springfield, Greene County, Missouri. Built in 1915, it was also called Barth's Clothing Store, and currently History Museum on the Square.

The building features terra cotta accents, concrete cornice and corbels, a restored and period accurate canopy, and a prominent illuminated sign above the front parapet.

== Museum ==
In 1977, Springfield resident Cathryn Cox Lipscomb founded a local history museum called the Museum of the Ozarks. Located in the historic Bently House near Drury College, Robert Neumann was the curator and director, until more space was needed and the museum relocated to the Old City Hall in 1993 before identifying the current location at the Barth's Building in 2008.

The building underwent a thorough interior renovation and an extensive exterior restoration beginning in 2014. Current director, John Sellars, and board president, Mary McQueary, were the driving forces for repurposing the building and expanding the museum to the footprint today. The restoration would be fully complete August 2019 and the Museum fully opened to the public.

The History Museum on the Square has also purchased the nearby historic Fox Theatre.

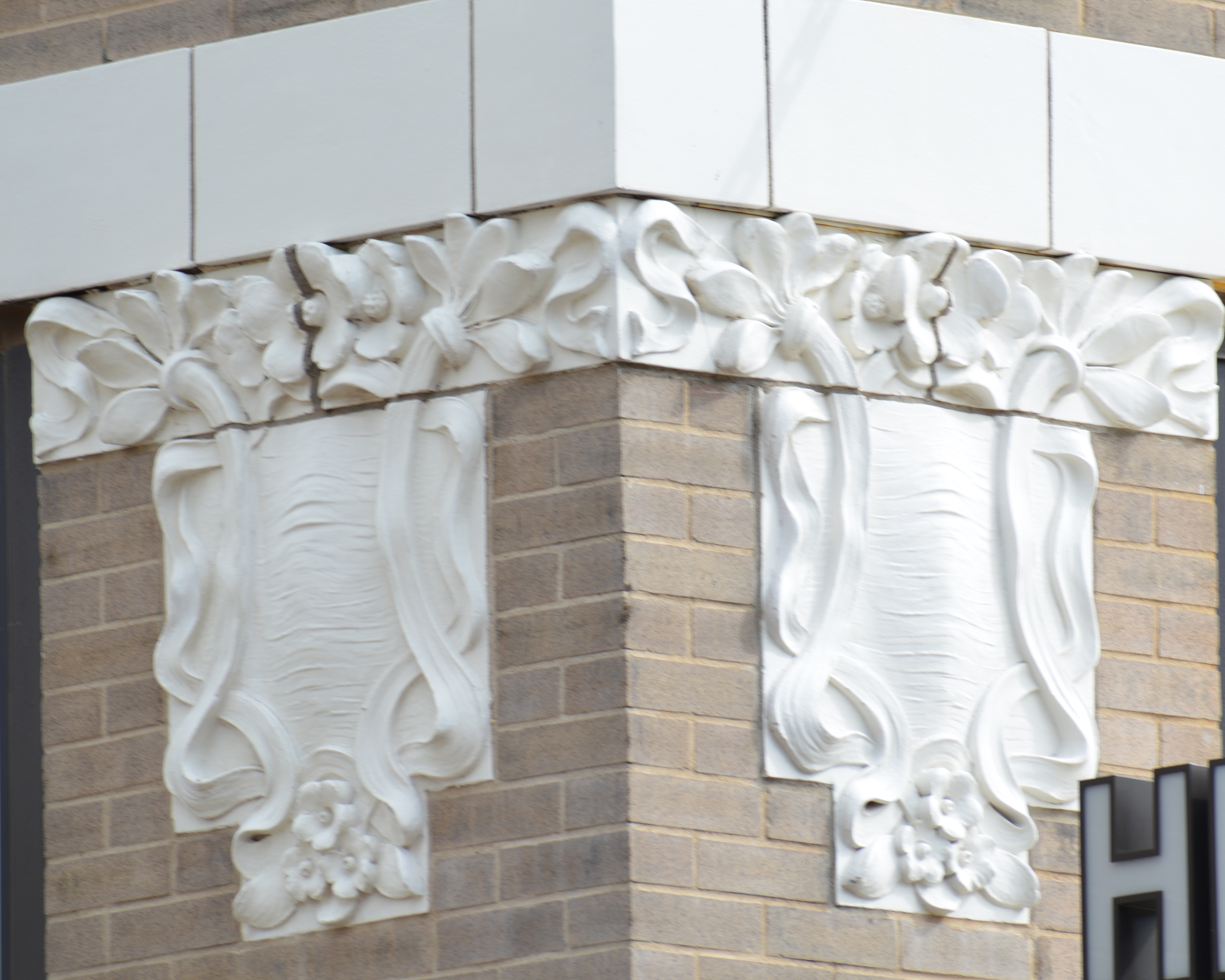
Close view of restored terra cotta accents on the Barth's Building in Springfield, MO
