= Mid-Town Historic District (Springfield, Missouri) =

Historic district in Missouri, United States

- U.S. National Register of Historic Places
- U.S. Historic district
- Location within Missouri Location within the United States
- Location: Roughly bounded by Pacific, Clay, Pythian, Summit, Calhoun, Washington, Central, Benton, Division, and Jefferson; also roughly along N. Robberson Ave. and N. Jefferson Ave., Springfield, Missouri
- Coordinates: 37°13′22″N 93°17′06″W
- Area: 123 acres (50 ha)
- Architectural style: Colonial Revival, Late Victorian, Bungalow/craftsman, T-Plan
- NRHP reference No.: 89000938, 02000851 (Boundary Increase)
- Added to NRHP: July 13, 1989, August 9, 2002 (Boundary Increase)

Mid-Town Historic District is a national historic district in Springfield, Missouri, United States. It encompasses 455 buildings, 8 structures, and 7 objects in a predominantly residential section of Springfield. It developed between about 1871 and 1952, and includes representative examples of Late Victorian, Colonial Revival, and Bungalow / American Craftsman architecture, including the separately listed Bentley House and Stone Chapel. Other notable buildings include those on the Drury College campus, Central Christian Church (1926), St. Johns Episcopal Church (1886), Mary S. Boyd School (1911), and Trinity Lutheran Church (c. 1919).

The district was added to the National Register of Historic Places in 1989 with a boundary increase in 2002.
