= Midtown Historic District (Mobile, Alabama) =

Historic district in Alabama, United States

- U.S. National Register of Historic Places
- U.S. Historic district
- Location within Mobile, Alabama Location within Alabama Location within the United States
- Location: Roughly bounded by Taylor Ave., US 90, Houston St., Kenneth St., US 98, and Florida St., 2401-2403 and 2407 Old Shell Rd., Mobile, Alabama
- Coordinates: 30°40′59.82″N 88°5′19.44″W
- Area: 467 acres (189 ha)
- Built: 1880s-1950s
- Architect: George Rogers; C.L. Hutchisson, Sr. C.L. Hutchisson, Jr. Nicholas Holmes, Jr. others
- Architectural style: Greek Revival, Queen Anne, late Victorian, Spanish Colonial Revival
- NRHP reference No.: 01001293 (original); 100005805 (increase)

Significant dates
- Added to NRHP: 29 November 2001
- Boundary increase: November 18, 2020

The Midtown Historic District is a historic district in the city of Mobile, Alabama, United States. It was placed on the National Register of Historic Places on November 29, 2001, with a small boundary increase on November 18, 2020 It is roughly bounded by Taylor Avenue, Government Street, Houston Street, Kenneth Street, Springhill Avenue, and Florida Street. The district covers 467 acres (1.89 km^{2}) and contains 1,270 contributing buildings. The majority of the contributing buildings range in age from the 1880s to the 1950s and cover a wide variety of architectural styles. The district was significantly affected by a tornado on December 25, 2012.

== Gallery ==
Contributing and individually NRHP-listed buildings to the Midtown Historic District

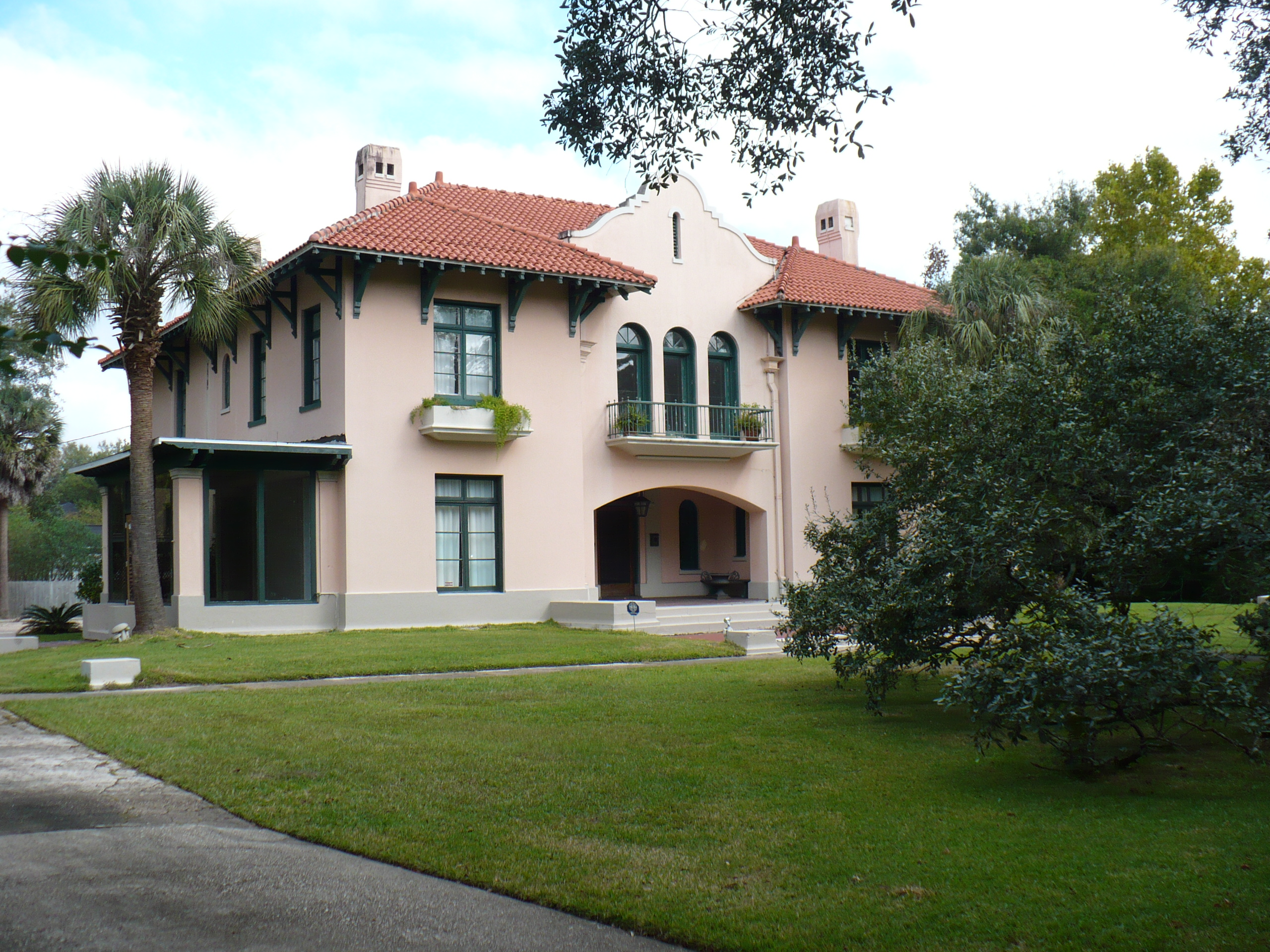
George Fearn House at 1806 Old Government Street

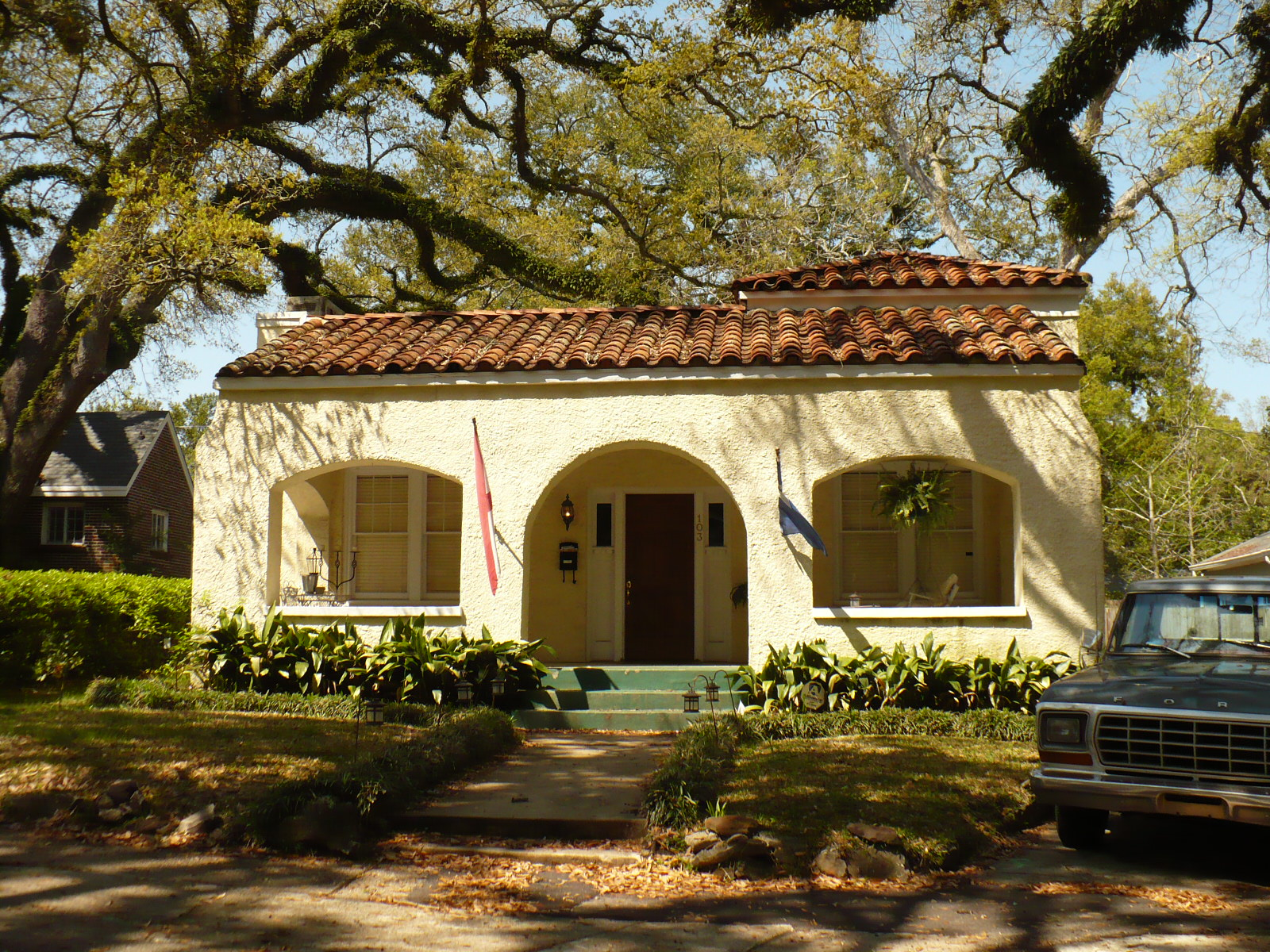
Wade Askew House at 103 Florence Place

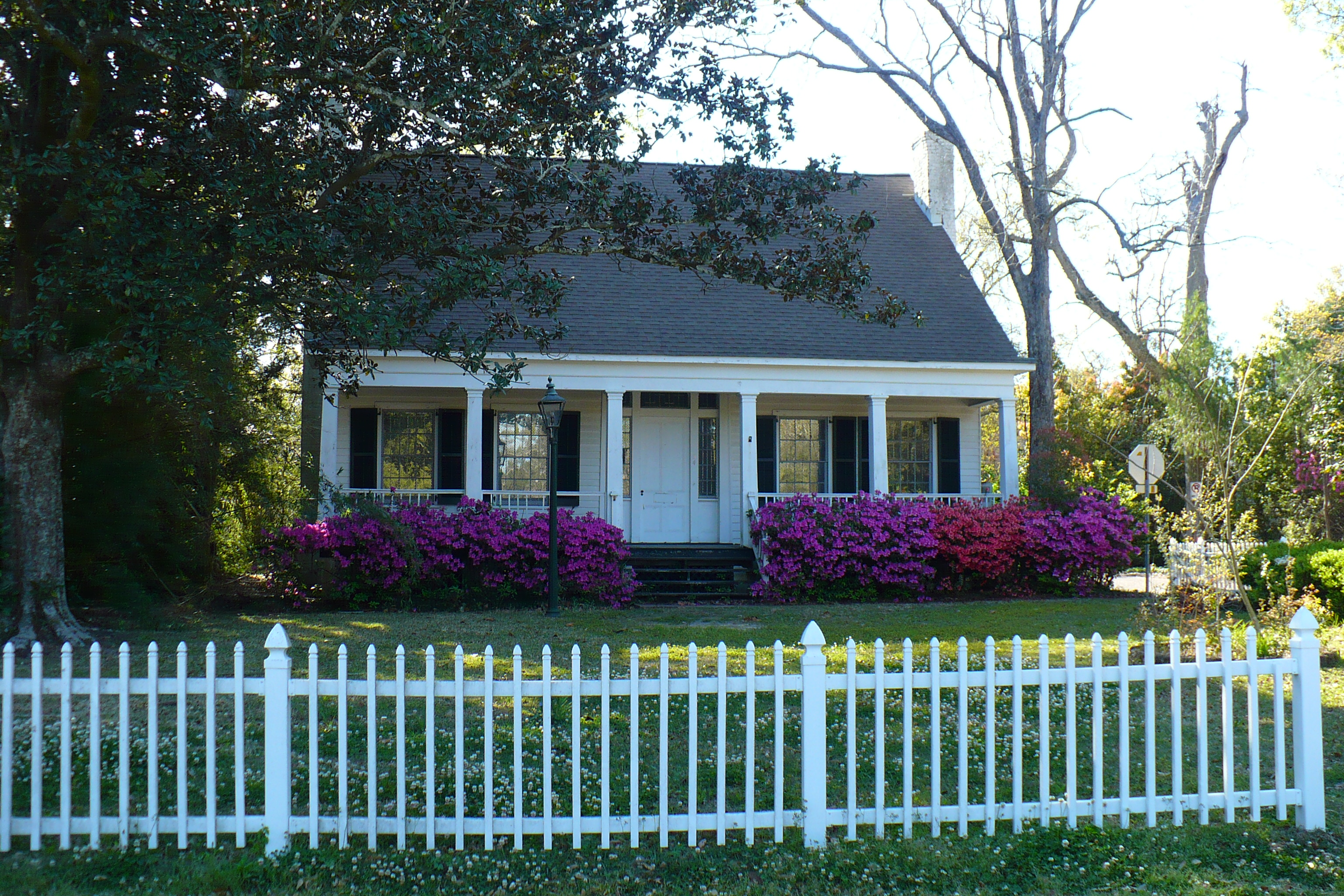
Carlen House at 54 South Carlen Street

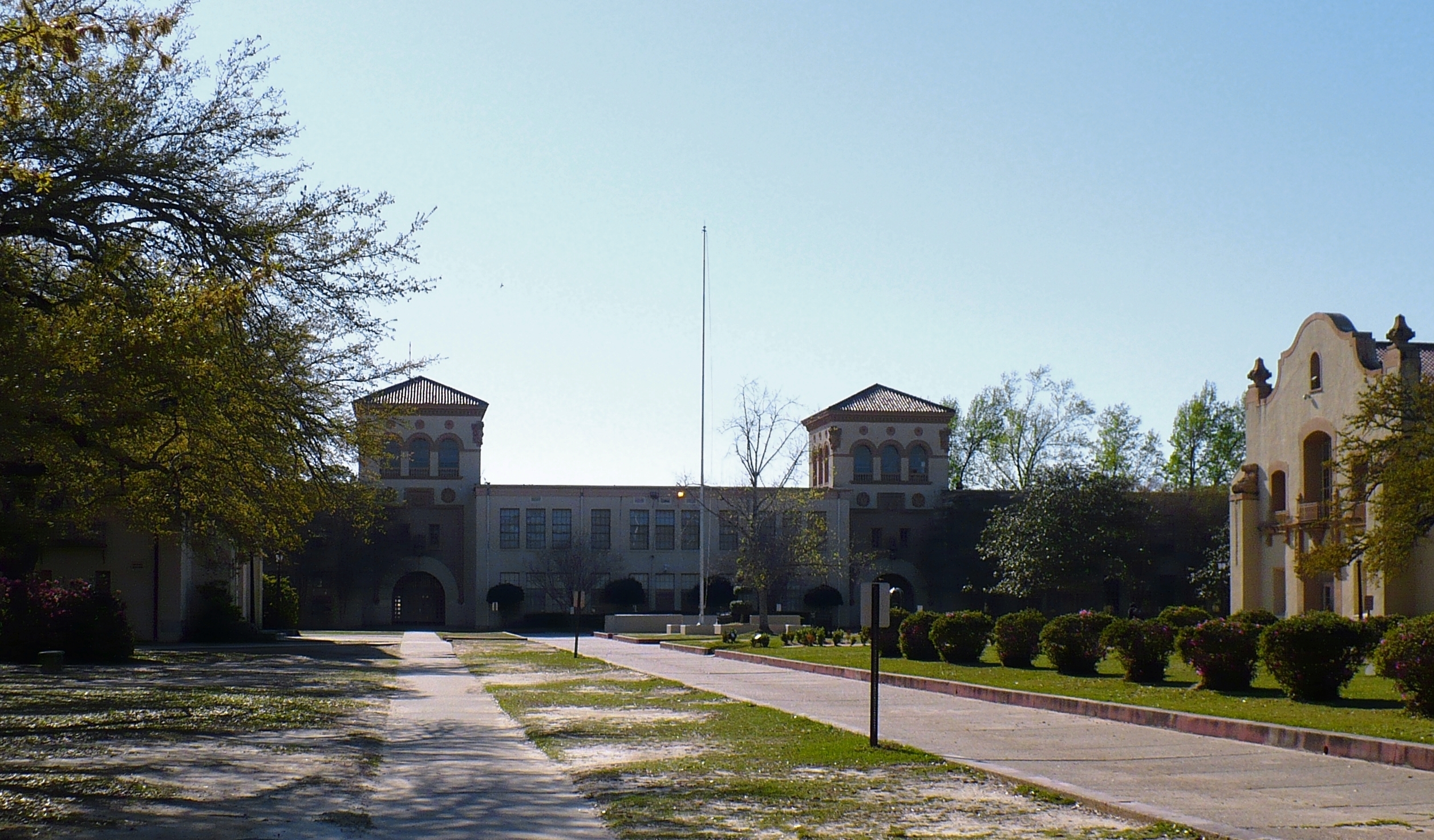
Murphy High School at 100 South Carlen Street

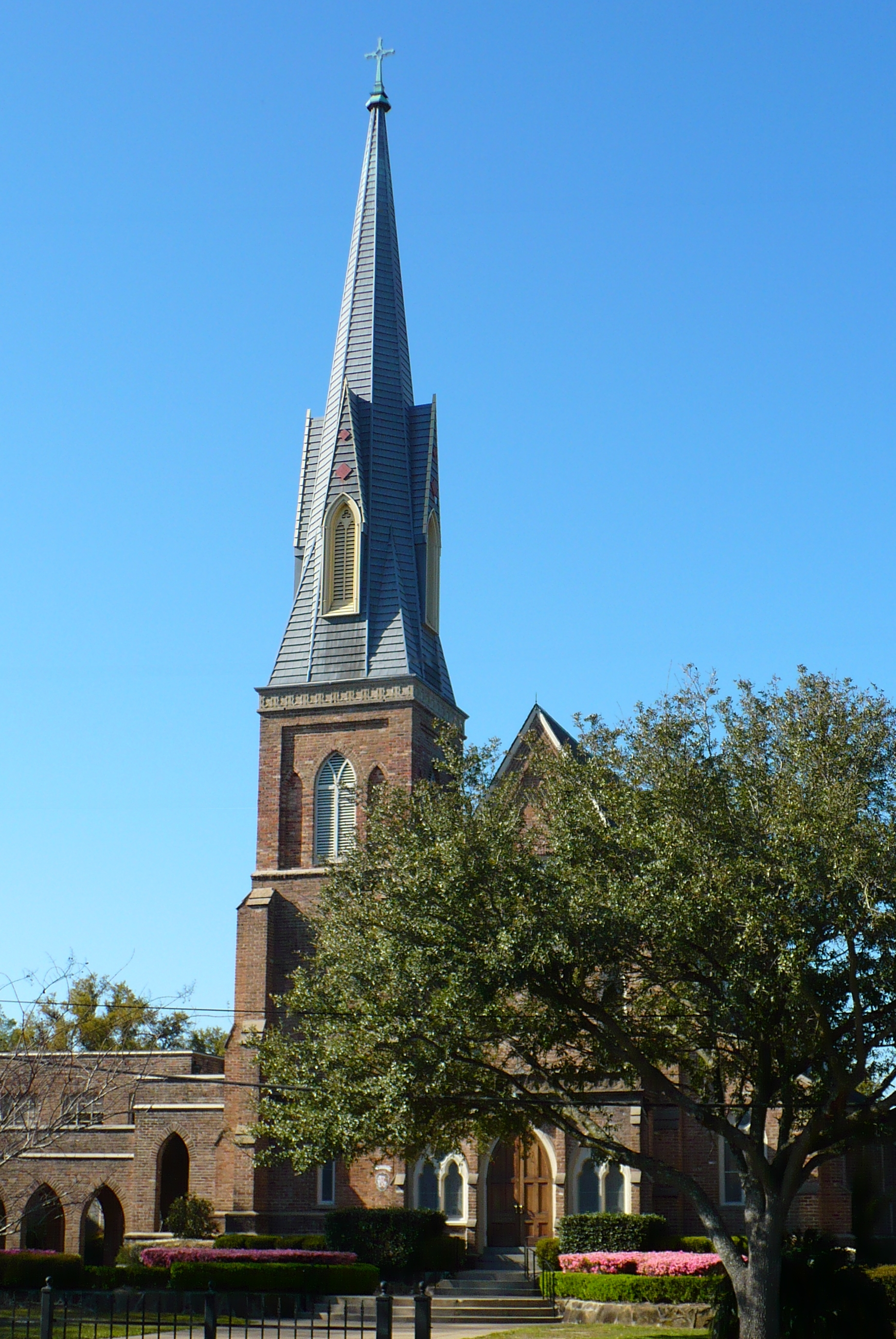
Trinity Episcopal Church at 1900 Dauphin Street

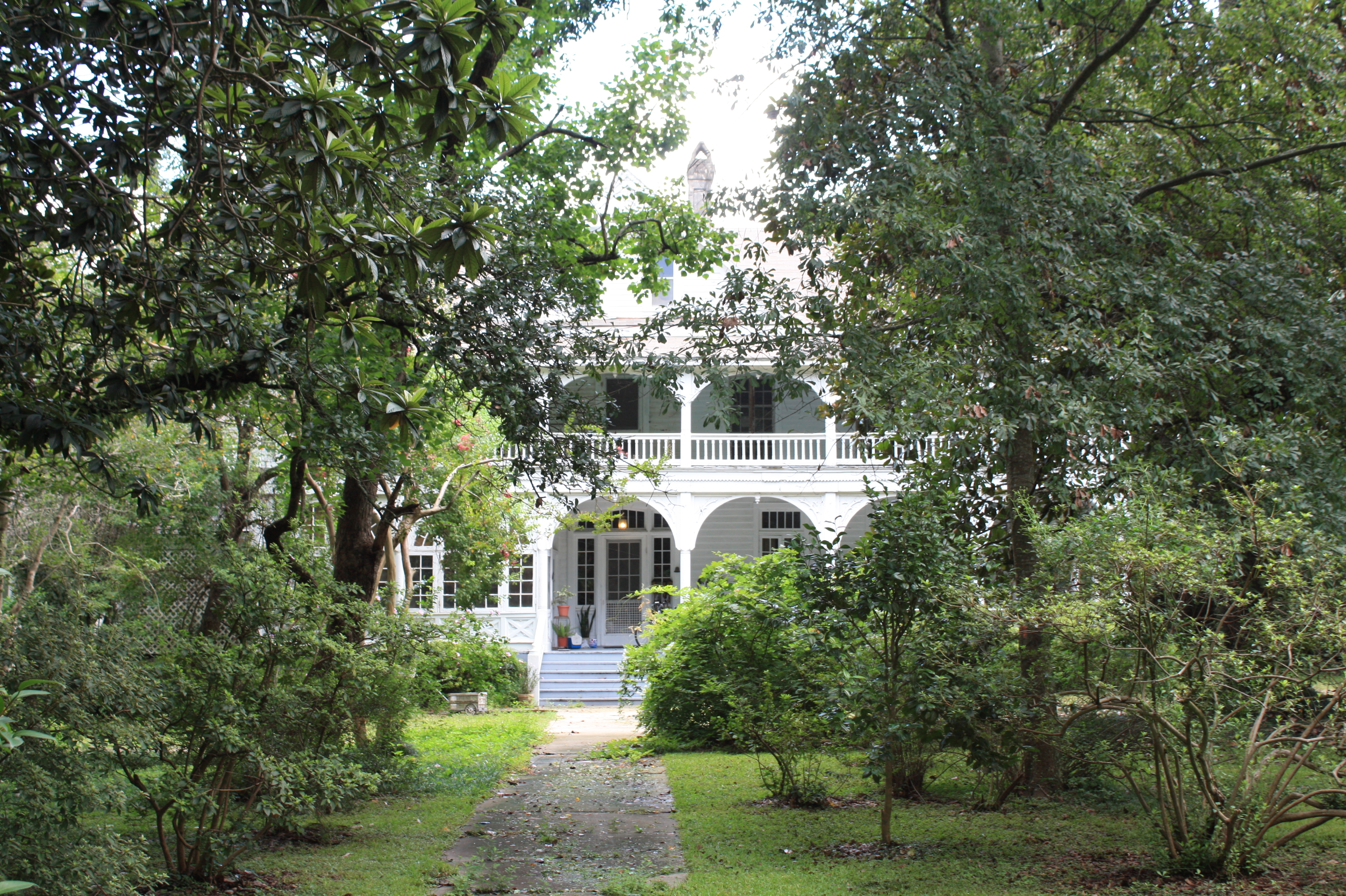
Termite Hall at 2000 Dauphin Street
