= Robert L. Spotswood House =

Historic house in Alabama, United States

- U.S. National Register of Historic Places
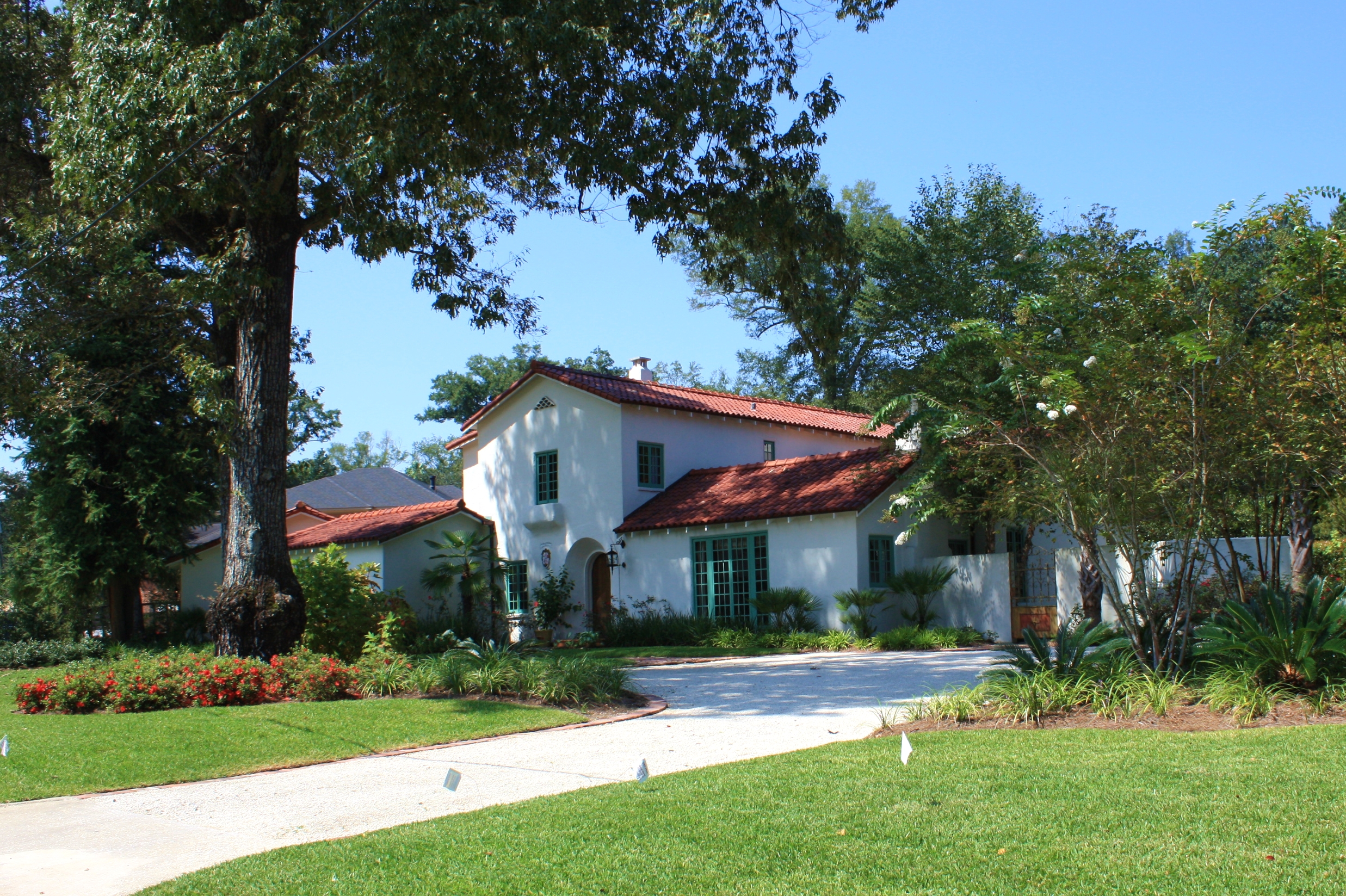

- Location within Mobile, Alabama Location within Alabama Location within the United States
- Location: 1 Country Club Road; Mobile, Alabama
- Coordinates: 30°41′33″N 88°9′0″W
- Area: less than one acre
- Built: 1926
- Architectural style: Spanish Revival
- MPS: Spanish Revival Residences in Mobile MPS
- NRHP reference No.: 91000854
- Added to NRHP: July 12, 1991

The Robert L. Spotswood House, also known as the J. Clyde Glenn House, is a historic residence in Mobile, Alabama, United States. It was built in 1926 in the Spanish Colonial Revival style. The house was placed on the National Register of Historic Places on July 12, 1991, as a part of the Spanish Revival Residences in Mobile Multiple Property Submission.
