= Spanish Revival Residences in Mobile Multiple Property Submission =

- U.S. National Register of Historic Places
- Location: Mobile, Alabama
- NRHP reference No.: 64500010

The Spanish Revival Residences in Mobile Multiple Property Submission is a multiple property submission of buildings that were listed together on the National Register of Historic Places as some of the best remaining examples in Mobile, Alabama of houses built in the Spanish Colonial Revival style. It covers ten properties.

Although best known in California and Florida, the style came early to Mobile and was eagerly embraced. The Latin colonial history of the city, as well as its semi-tropical climate, are thought by architectural scholars to have been a factor in this. The George Fearn House was the first example in 1904, quickly followed by the grand Gulf, Mobile and Ohio Passenger Terminal in 1907. Government Street Methodist Church (1906–1917) was another elaborate example. These grand buildings spurred the building of Spanish Revival houses of varying degrees of sophistication in neighborhoods all around the rapidly growing city during the 1920s. The Mobile Country Club, completed in 1927, and some of its surrounding mansions was built in the style. The middle-class Florence Place subdivision was originally solely composed of Spanish Revival houses.

Resource Name	Also known as	Coordinates	City	County	Added	Notes
Wade Askew House			Mobile	Mobile County	July 12, 1991	House built in 1927.
George Fearn House			Mobile	Mobile County	July 12, 1991	Mansion built in 1904.
George Levy House			Mobile	Mobile County	July 12, 1991	House built in 1927.
Ernest Megginson House			Mobile	Mobile County	July 12, 1991	House built in 1927.
James Arthur Morrison House	James and Nancy Walker House		Mobile	Mobile County	July 12, 1991	Mansion built in 1926.
J. E. Paterson House	Ed and Betty Bush House		Mobile	Mobile County	July 12, 1991	House built in 1929.
Robert L. Spotswood House	J. Clyde Glenn House		Mobile	Mobile County	July 12, 1991	Mansion built in 1926.
Arthur VanderSys House	James Curtis Cloninger House		Mobile	Mobile County	July 12, 1991	House built in 1926.
Jacob VanderSys House	Eva Tanner House		Mobile	Mobile County	July 12, 1991	House built in 1927.
Joseph M. Walker House	Kay Lindsey Kimbrough House		Mobile	Mobile County	July 12, 1991	House built in 1927.

== See also ==
- National Register of Historic Places Multiple Property Submissions in Alabama
- National Register of Historic Places listings in Mobile, Alabama
