= James Arthur Morrison House =

Historic house in Alabama, US

- U.S. National Register of Historic Places
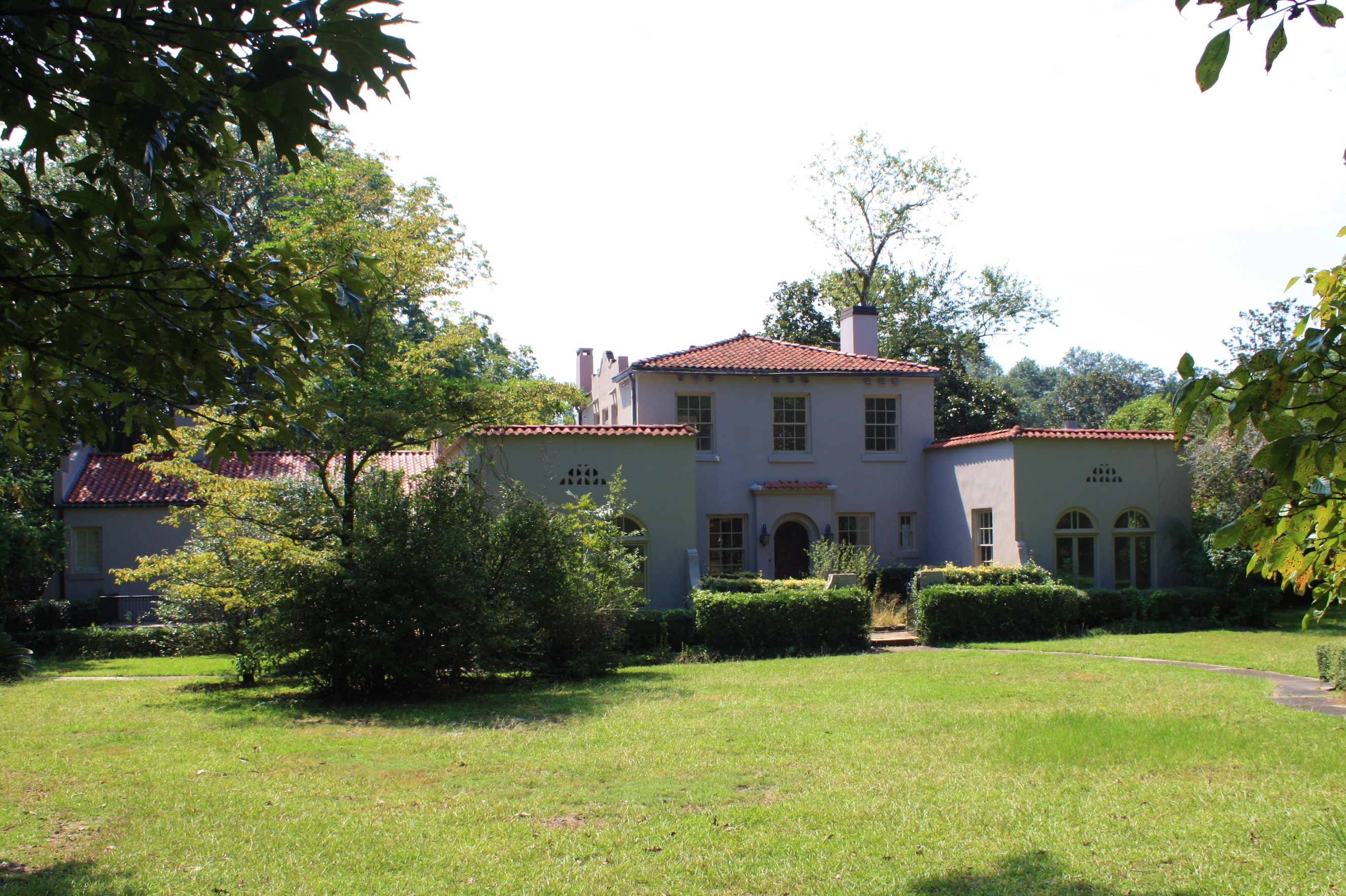

- Location within Mobile, Alabama Location within Alabama Location within the United States
- Location: 159 Hillwood Rd., Mobile, Alabama
- Coordinates: 30°41′38″N 88°9′0″W
- Area: 1.5 acres (0.61 ha)
- Built: 1926
- Architectural style: Spanish Colonial Revival
- MPS: Spanish Revival Residences in Mobile MPS
- NRHP reference No.: 91000863
- Added to NRHP: July 12, 1991

The James Arthur Morrison House, also known as the Morrison-Walker House, is a historic Spanish Colonial Revival style house and garage/guest house in Mobile, Alabama, United States. The two-story stucco and concrete main house was completed in 1926. It features Mission-style side parapets on the main block, red tile roofing, a central entrance courtyard with a decorative gate, a rear arcaded porch, and arched doorways on the exterior and in the interior. The matching garage/guest house has a two-story central block with a massive chimney and is flanked to each side by one-story garage door bays. The house and garage were added to the National Register of Historic Places as a part of the Spanish Revival Residences in Mobile Multiple Property Submission on July 12, 1991.
