= George Levy House =

Historic house in Alabama, United States

- U.S. National Register of Historic Places
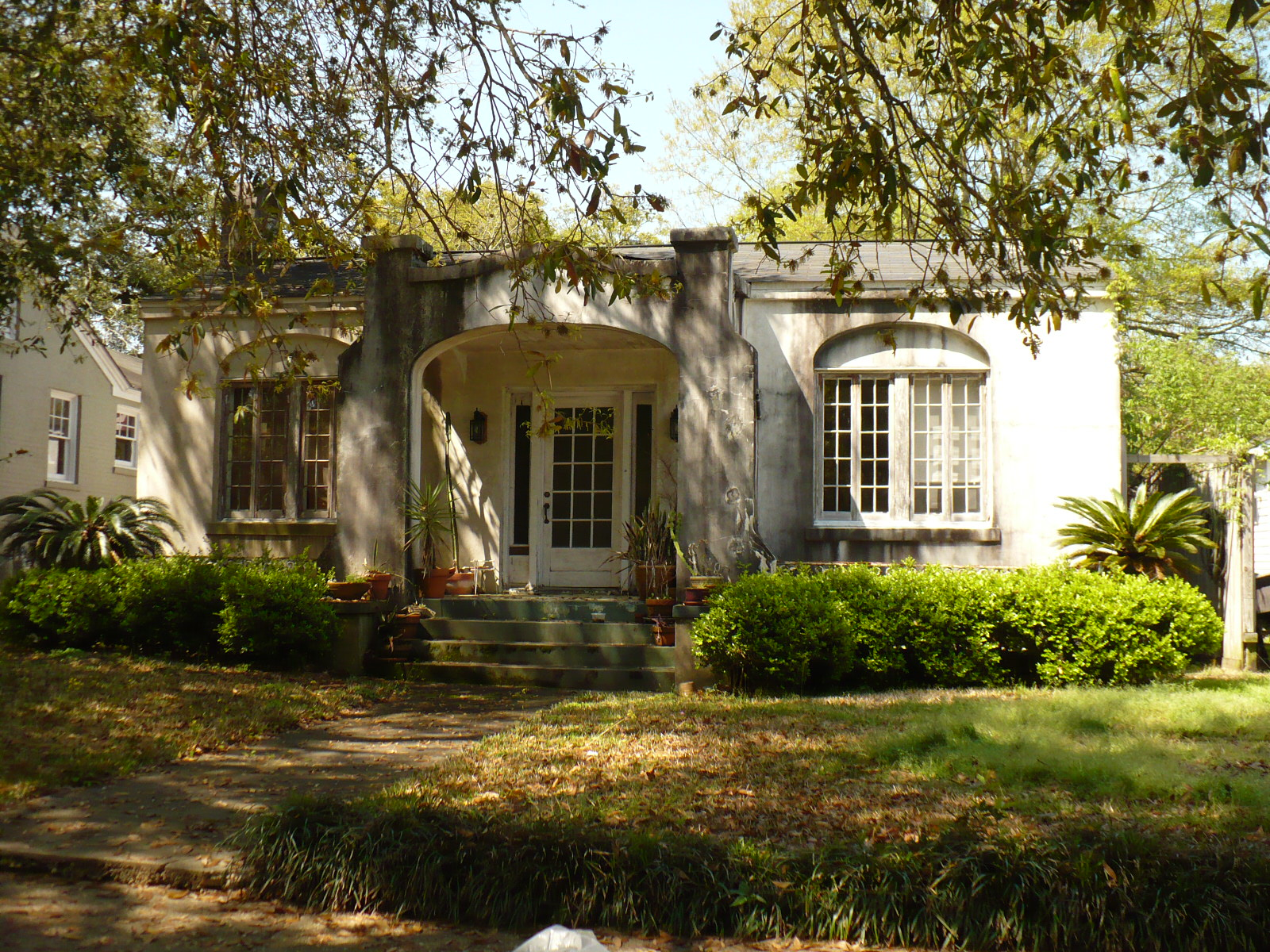
- The George Levy House in 2008.

- Location within Mobile, Alabama Location within Alabama Location within the United States
- Location: 107 Florence Place, Mobile, Alabama
- Coordinates: 30°41′18″N 88°5′22″W
- Area: 0.16 acres (0.065 ha)
- Built: 1927
- Architectural style: Spanish Colonial Revival
- MPS: Spanish Revival Residences in Mobile MPS
- NRHP reference No.: 91000861
- Added to NRHP: July 12, 1991

The George Levy House (also known as the Allan Bailey House) is a historic house located in Mobile, Alabama.

== Description and history ==
The one-story, informally landscaped house was built in 1927 in the Spanish Colonial Revival style. It stands on 50 by 140 foot lot.

The building was placed on the National Register of Historic Places on July 12, 1991, as a part of the Spanish Revival Residences in Mobile Multiple Property Submission.

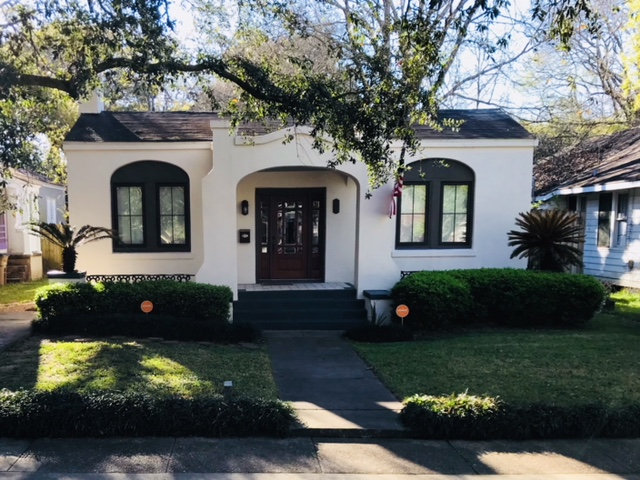
The house in March 2018
