= J. E. Paterson House =

Historic house in Alabama, United States

- U.S. National Register of Historic Places
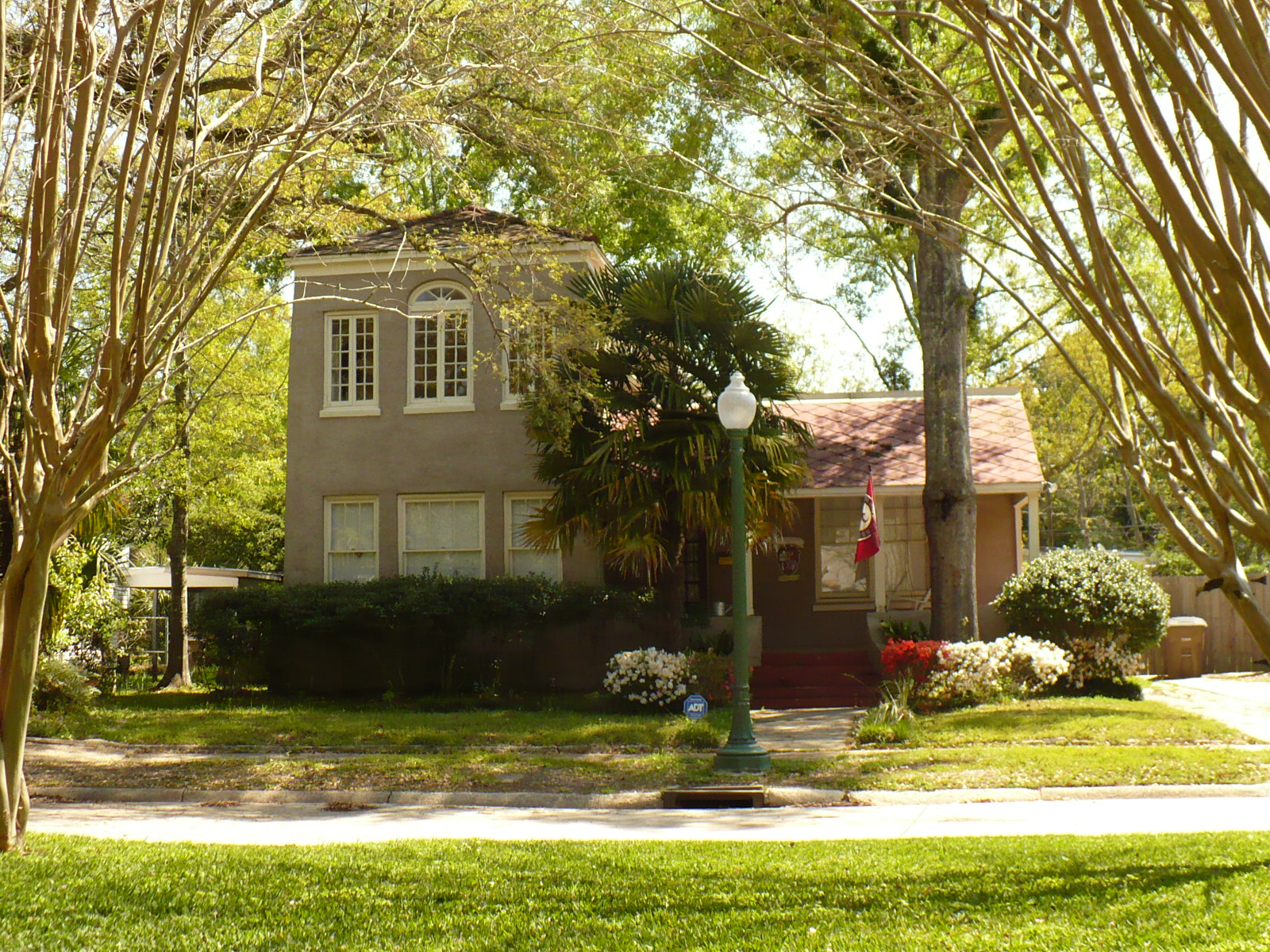
- The J. E. Paterson House in 2008

- Location within Mobile, Alabama Location within Alabama Location within the United States
- Location: Mobile, Alabama
- Coordinates: 30°41′21″N 88°5′21″W
- Built: 1929
- Architectural style: Spanish Colonial Revival
- MPS: Spanish Revival Residences in Mobile MPS
- NRHP reference No.: 91000859
- Added to NRHP: July 12, 1991

The J. E. Paterson House is a historic residence in Mobile, Alabama, United States. It was built in 1929 in the Spanish Colonial Revival style. The building was placed on the National Register of Historic Places on July 12, 1991. It is a part of the Spanish Revival Residences in Mobile Multiple Property Submission.
