= William L. Megginson =

American economist

William L. Megginson is an American economist, currently the Price Chair in Finance at Michael F. Price College of Business, University of Oklahoma and also the Saudi Aramco Chair Professor in Finance at King Fahd University of Petroleum and Minerals. In 2008, he was the Fulbright Tocqueville Distinguished Chair in American Studies at Paris Dauphine University.

Megginson is the son of Leon C. Megginson, also a business school professor and noted for his clarifying statements about Darwinism.
