= George Fearn House =

Historic house in Alabama, United States

- U.S. National Register of Historic Places
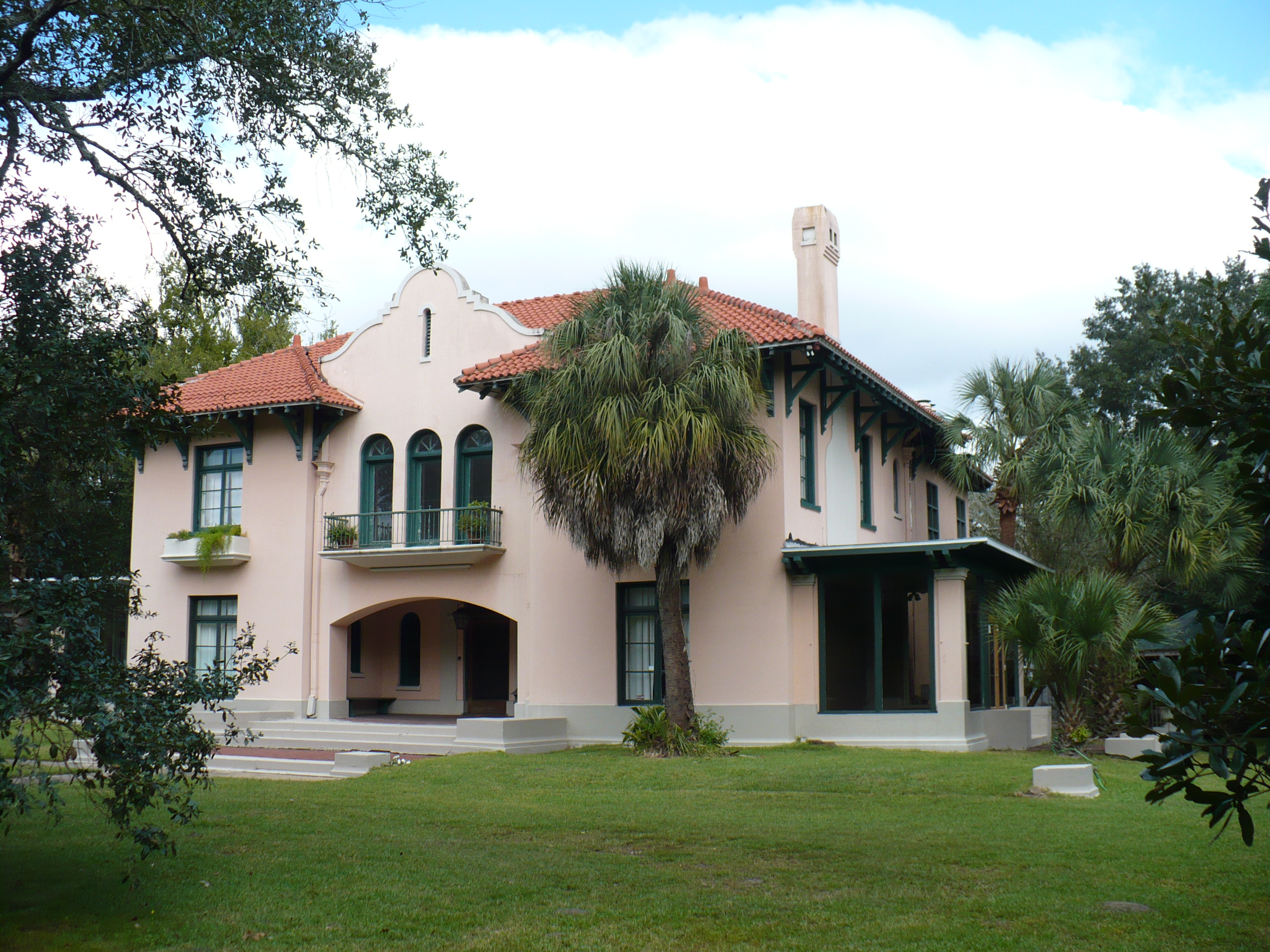
- The George Fearn House in 2008.

- Location within Mobile, Alabama Location within Alabama Location within the United States
- Location: Mobile, Alabama
- Coordinates: 30°40′42″N 88°4′56″W
- Built: 1904
- Architect: George Rogers
- Architectural style: Spanish Revival
- MPS: Spanish Revival Residences in Mobile MPS
- NRHP reference No.: 91000855
- Added to NRHP: July 12, 1991

The George Fearn House is a historic residence in Mobile, Alabama, United States. It was built in 1904 in the Spanish Colonial Revival style by local architect George Bigelow Rogers. It was the first Spanish Colonial Revival building to be built in Mobile. The house was placed on the National Register of Historic Places on July 12, 1991. It is a part of the Spanish Revival Residences in Mobile Multiple Property Submission.
