= Leon C. Megginson =

Business school professor

Leon Cassity Megginson
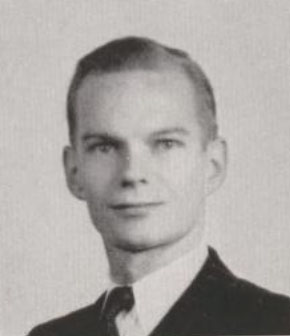
- College yearbook portrait, 1947
- Born: July 26, 1921; Thomasville, Alabama, US
- Died: February 22, 2010 (aged 88); Daphne, Alabama, US
- Occupation: Business school professor
- Awards: Fulbright Scholar

Academic background
- Education: Ph.D. (1952)
- Alma mater: Louisiana State University

Academic work
- Discipline: Business management
- Institutions: Louisiana State University
- Notable ideas: Refined statement of Darwinism

Leon C. Megginson (1921 - 2010) was a professor in the business school at Louisiana State University (1952-1977), the University of South Alabama (1977-1999) and the J. L. Bedsole Professor of Business Studies at the University of Mobile as of 1999. He published extensively in the academic literature.

Megginson is often cited for his clarifying statement about evolution, which made him well-cited beyond the business school scholarly literature. Megginson stated: "It is not the strongest species that survive, nor the most intelligent but the ones most adaptable to change."

== Early life and education ==
Megginson was born in Thomasville, Alabama, on July 26, 1921. His childhood education was in Thomasville and also in Mobile, Alabama. He served in the U.S. Army Air Forces in World War II, initially as a second lieutenant and completed his commission in 1945 with the military rank of captain. Megginson was a pilot in the Eighth Air Force in England during the war, flying the P-38 Lightning fighter aircraft.

Following his military service, Megginson enrolled in Mississippi College. He completed his bachelor's degree in 1947. While in college, he met his future wife Lois Fitzgerald, whom he soon married. Megginson enrolled in graduate school at Louisiana State University (LSU), completing his doctorate in business management in 1952.

== Career ==
External images
- Portrait of Leon C. Megginson
- “Portrait of Leon C. Megginson", as published on Goodreads

Following completion of his doctorate, Megginson became a member of the business school faculty at LSU. He advanced through the academic ranks, became full professor and ultimately emeritus professor at the time of his 1977 retirement from LSU.

During his tenure at LSU, Megginson published prolifically in the scholarly literature and authored several books. He additionally won teaching awards at the university.

Following his retirement from LSU, Megginson then became Research Professor of Management at the University of South Alabama, where he remained until 1999. At that time, Megginson received an endowed professorship at the University of Mobile, which carried the title "J. L. Bedsole Professor of Business Studies and Chairman of the Division of Business Administration and Computer Sciences".

=== Statement of Darwinism ===
In 1963, Megginson published an article in The Southwestern Social Science Quarterly stating the importance of humans and human institutions to develop and improve or they will deteriorate. He cited evidence from various realms of human endeavor, including literature, the social sciences, and the natural sciences. Regarding Darwinism and American business, Megginson stated:

"According to Darwin's Origin of Species, it is not the most intellectual of the species that survives; it is not the strongest that survives; but the species that survives is the one that is able best to adapt and adjust to the changing environment in which it finds itself."

In the same publication, Megginson extended this perspective on Darwinism to other aspects of human endeavor, stating "....that the civilization that is able to survive is one that is able to adapt to the changing physical, social, political, moral and spiritual environment in which it finds itself."

Megginson's publication continued to be widely cited and most especially among people specializing in business management.

Subsequently, Megginson's statement was often mis-attributed to Charles Darwin. The origin of the statement was later traced by biologist Nicholas J. Matzke to Leon C. Megginson.

=== Business scholarship ===
Megginson articulated other principles of business management during his career. In a 1958 scholarly article in the Journal of the Academy of Management, Megginson stated principles of management that apply in many managerial situations including business management and extending to governments, religious organizations, and social organizations. These principles additionally are relevant at all managerial levels.

=== Honors ===
Megginson was a Fulbright Scholar, residing in Spain, in 1961 - 1962, working in the fields of labor and industrial relations. Additionally, he served as a Ford Foundation resident advisor to Pakistan from 1968 to 1970, residing there during much of this time period. He was the United States representative to the UNIDO conference in 1971. Megginson was active in various professional societies, serving at times as president of the Southwestern Social Sciences Association, of the Southern Management Association, and the Case Research Association.

== Personal life and death ==
Megginson traveled extensively during the course of his career, documenting his travels with extensive photography. One of Megginson's three children, William Leon Megginson, also became a business school professor.

Megginson resided in Theodore, Alabama, for the last years of his life, where he was living at the time of his death. He is interred at Serenity Memorial Gardens in Theodore, Alabama.

== Representative publications ==
- Megginson, Leon C., et al. Small Business Management: An Entrepreneur's Guidebook. Irwin/McGraw-Hill, 2000, ISBN 978-0078029097.
- Megginson, Leon C. "Lessons from Europe for American business." The Southwestern Social Science Quarterly (1963): 3–13.
- Megginson, Leon C. "Management in Perspective Automation: Our Greatest Asset—Our Greatest Problem?." Academy of Management Journal 6.3 (1963): 232–244.
- Megginson, Leon C. "A Striving for Excellence." National Forum. Vol. 47. No. 3. Honor Society of Phi Kappa Phi, 1967.
- Megginson, Leon C. "The human consequences of office automation." Personnel 37.5 (1960): 18–26.
