= Stone Chapel =

- U.S. National Register of Historic Places
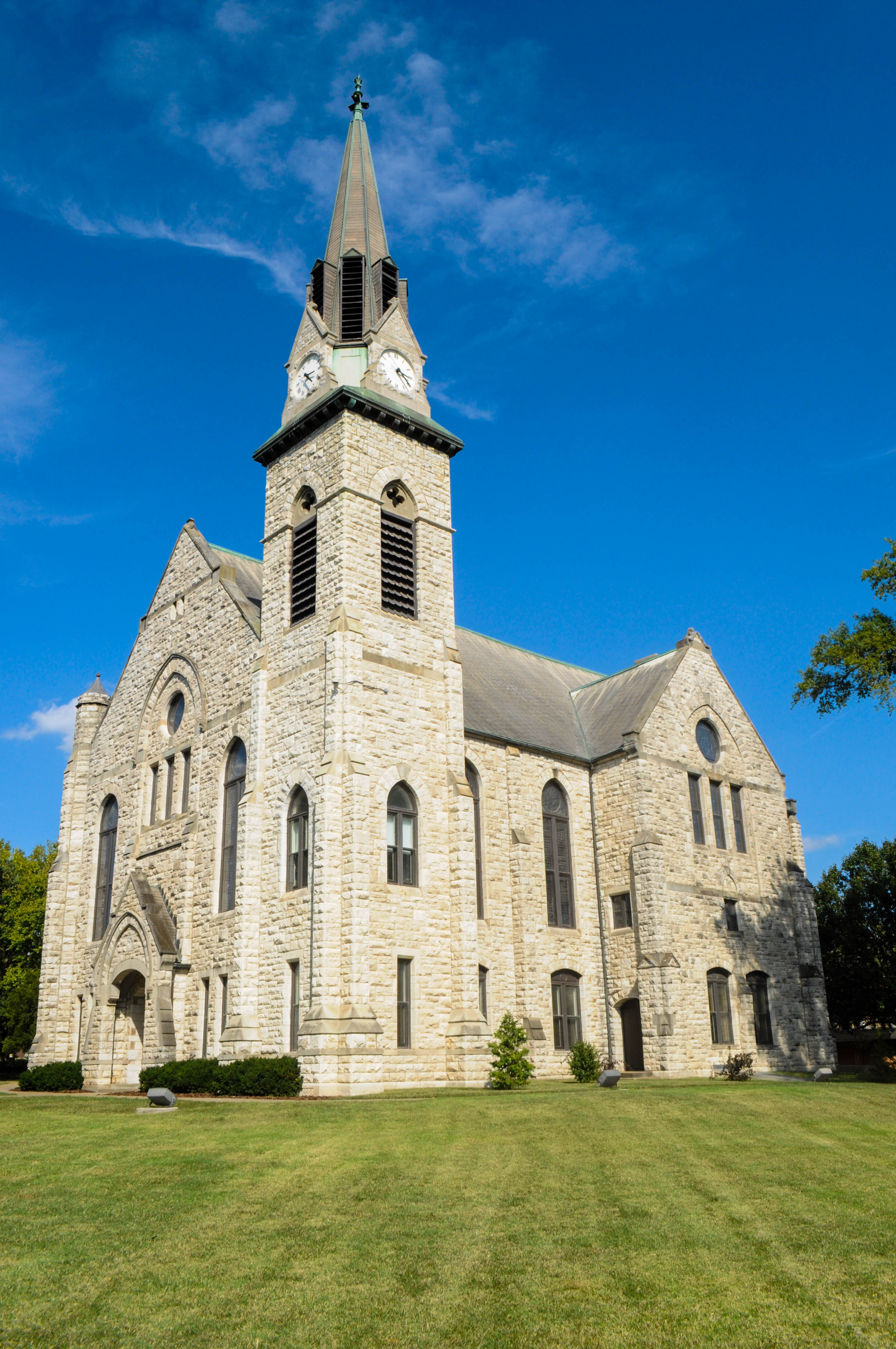

- Location within Missouri Location within the United States
- Location: Springfield, MO
- Coordinates: 37°13′3.89″N 93°17′12.72″W
- Built: 1880
- Architect: Williams & Franklin
- Architectural style: Mid 19th Century Revival
- NRHP reference No.: 82000583
- Added to NRHP: October 21, 1982

Stone Chapel is a historic chapel located on the southwest edge of the Drury University campus, at the corner of Central and Benton Avenue at Springfield, Greene County, Missouri. It was built in 1880 and is the oldest stone structure in Springfield. The chapel is the location for a number of religious activities for Drury University, such as the LOGOS Christian Fellowship, Catholic Campus Ministries, and Chow and Chapel events, weddings, graduation Baccalaureate and other various secular activities.

The distinctive second floor sanctuary seats around 510 people. A large lounge, kitchenette, choir and meeting facilities occupy the first floor. The recently restored Lyon-Healy pipe organ dates from 1906. The three-manual, 30-rank instrument is utilized by a large class of organ students, for weekend weddings, for the popular Christmas Vespers, and for recitals and other special events in the chapel. The organ is well known for its rich sound, enhanced by the chapel's mellow acoustics.

It was added to the National Register of Historic Places in 1982.
