= Ernest Megginson House =

Historic house in Alabama, United States

- U.S. National Register of Historic Places
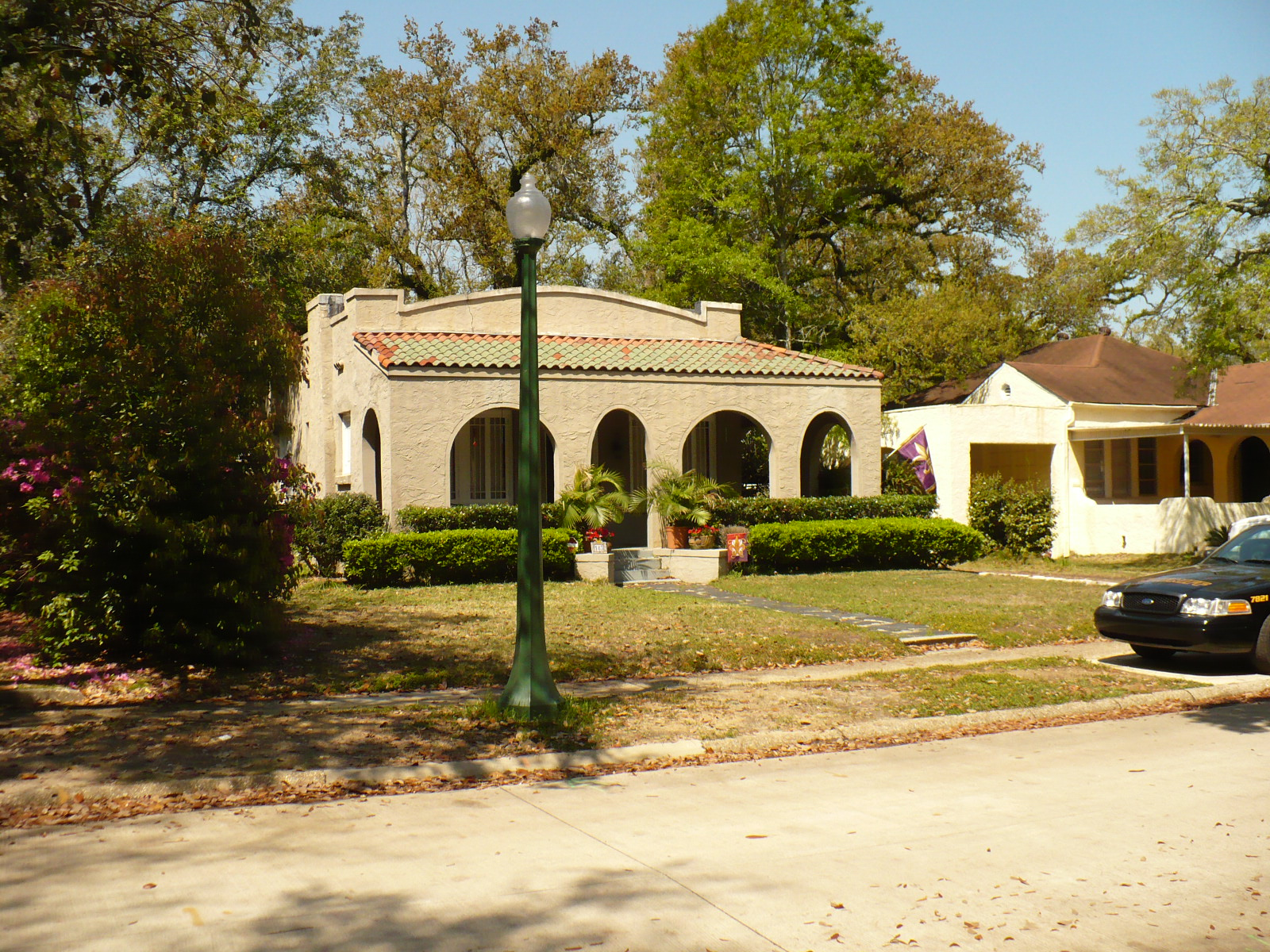
- The Ernest Megginson House in 2008

- Location within Mobile, Alabama Location within Alabama Location within the United States
- Location: 143 Florence Place, Mobile, Alabama
- Coordinates: 30°41′26″N 88°5′22″W
- Area: less than one acre
- Built: 1927
- Architectural style: Mission Revival-Spanish Colonial Revival
- MPS: Spanish Revival Residences in Mobile MPS
- NRHP reference No.: 91000860
- Added to NRHP: July 12, 1991

The Ernest Megginson House is a historic house located in Mobile, Alabama.

== Description and history ==
The one-story, informally landscaped house was built in 1927 in the Spanish Colonial Revival style. The building was placed on the National Register of Historic Places on July 12, 1991. It is a part of the Spanish Revival Residences in Mobile Multiple Property Submission. It is named after Ernest M. Megginson, who served as Mayor of Mobile four times between 1942 and 1951.
