= Bentley House (Springfield, Missouri) =

Historic house in Missouri, United States

- U.S. National Register of Historic Places
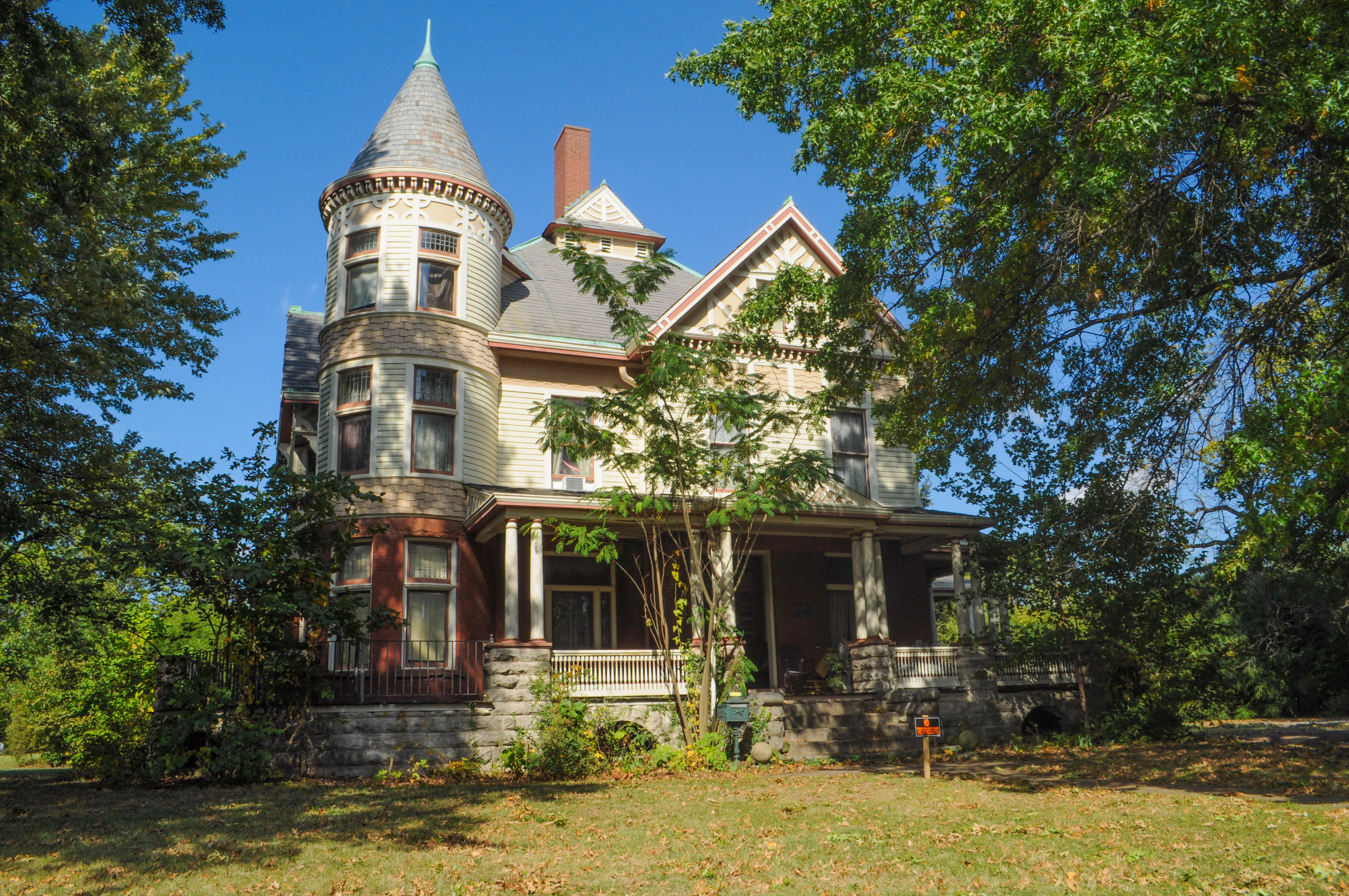

- Location within Missouri Location within the United States
- Location: 603 E. Calhoun St., Springfield, Missouri
- Coordinates: 37°13′21″N 93°17′6″W
- Area: less than one acre
- Built: 1892
- Architect: Hackney, W.F.
- Architectural style: Queen Anne, Picturesque villa
- NRHP reference No.: 80002354
- Added to NRHP: November 14, 1980

Bentley House, also known as the Museum of the Ozarks, is a historic home located at Springfield, Greene County, Missouri. It was built in 1892, and is a two-story, Queen Anne style brick and frame dwelling.

== Architecture ==
As with most Queen Anne homes, the house was designed with detailed exterior features, a prominent front tower, intricate trim and dentils, and a complex roof of gables and hips projecting at right angles and accented by several dormers. The semi-detached tower reaches the highest point with a conical roof and spire. Multiple porches, and a porte cochere, feature decorative spindles.

It was listed on the National Register of Historic Places in 1980.

== History ==
J.F.G. Bently, president of the Bank of Springfield, constructed a home proposed to be "one of the grandest homes in all of Springfield."

It was a single family home and remained in the Bently family until 1964 when it was sold to Drury College in 1965. In 1977, Springfield established a local history museum called Museum of the Ozarks.

In 1993 the museum would seek a larger space and sold the home to a private resident. Because Drury College is a private school, the home has technically maintained private ownership throughout its life.
