= St. Francis Xavier Church =

St. Francis Xavier Church, including ones named Cathedral, and variations may refer to:

== Australia ==
- St Francis Xavier's Cathedral, Adelaide, South Australia
- St Francis Xavier's Cathedral, Geraldton, Western Australia
- St Francis Xavier Church, Goodna, Queensland
- St Francis Xavier's Roman Catholic Church, Berrima, New South Wales

== China ==
- Chapel of St. Francis Xavier, Macau
- St. Francis Xavier Church (Shanghai)

== France ==
- Saint-François-Xavier, Paris

== Germany ==
- St Francis Xavier Church, Dresden, Dresden, Saxony

== India ==
- St. Francis Xavier Church, Mangalore, Karnataka
- St. Francis Xavier's Church, Pizhala, Kerala
- St. Francis Xavier's Church, Sampaloor, Kerala
- St. Xavier's Church, Peyad, Thiruvananthapuram, Kerala
- St. Francis Xavier's Church, Giriz, Vasai, Maharashtra
- St. Francis Xavier Church, Kethanahalli, Dharamapuri, Tamil Nadu
- St. Francis Xavier Church, Kovilur, Dharamapuri, Tamil Nadu
- St. Francis Xavier's Cathedral, Kottar, Tamil Nadu
- St. Francis Xavier Church, Velim, Goa

== Ireland ==
- Saint Francis Xavier Church, Dublin

== Lithuania ==
- Church of St. Francis Xavier, Kaunas

== Malaysia ==
- Church of St. Francis Xavier, Malacca City, Malacca
- St. Francis Xavier's Church, Petaling Jaya, Selangor
- St. Francis Xavier's Church, Georgetown, Penang

== Netherlands ==
- St Francis Xavier Church, Enkhuizen

== Oman ==
- St. Francis Xavier Church, Salalah

== Pakistan ==
- St Francis Xavier Church, Sargodha

== Singapore ==
- Church of Saint Francis Xavier, Singapore

== Slovakia ==
- St. Francis Xavier Cathedral (Bystrica, Slovakia)

== Thailand ==
- St. Francis Xavier Church, Bangkok, Thailand

== United Kingdom ==
- St Francis Xavier Church, Hereford, England
- St Francis Xavier Church, Liverpool, England
- St Joseph and St Francis Xavier Church, Richmond, England
- St Francis Xavier's Church, Falkirk, Scotland
- St David Lewis and St Francis Xavier Church, Usk, in the North Gwent Deanery, Wales

== United States ==
(by state then city)

- Saint Francis Xavier Roman Catholic Church (Mobile, Alabama), listed on the National Register of Historic Places (NRHP)
- Mission San Xavier del Bac, Tucson, Arizona, listed on the NRHP
- Basilica of St. Francis Xavier, Dyersville, Dyersville, Iowa, listed on the NRHP
- St. Francis Xavier Cathedral (Alexandria, Louisiana), listed on the NRHP
- St. Francis Xavier Church (Baltimore, Maryland)
- St. Francis Xavier Church and Newtown Manor House Historic District, Compton, Maryland, listed on the NRHP
- St. Francis Xavier Church (Warwick, Maryland), listed on the NRHP in Maryland
- Church of St. Francis Xavier (Benson, Minnesota), listed on the NRHP in Swift County, Minnesota
- Church of St. Francis Xavier (Grand Marais, Minnesota)
- Church of St. Francis Xavier-Catholic (Grand Marais, Minnesota), Grand Marais, MN, listed on the NRHP in Minnesota
- St. Francis Xavier Convent, Vicksburg, Mississippi, listed on the NRHP in Warren County
- St. Francis Xavier College Church, St. Louis, Missouri
- St. Francis Xavier Catholic Church and Rectory, Taos, Missouri
- St. Francis Xavier Church (Missoula, Montana), listed on the NRHP in Montana
- St. Francis Xavier Church (Manhattan), New York
- St. Francis Xavier Church (Brooklyn), located in Park Slope, Brooklyn, New York
- St. Francis Xavier's Church (Bronx, New York)
- St. Francis Xavier Roman Catholic Parish Complex in Buffalo, New York
- St. Francis Xavier Church (Cincinnati, Ohio), listed on the NRHP in Ohio
- St. Francis Xavier Roman Catholic Church (Cresson, Pennsylvania)
- St. Francis Xavier Church (Winooski, Vermont), listed on the Vermont State Historic Register
- St. Francis Xavier Church (Parkersburg, West Virginia), listed on the NRHP in West Virginia
- Cathedral of Saint Francis Xavier in Green Bay, Green Bay, Wisconsin

== See also ==
- Church of St. Francis Xavier-Catholic (disambiguation)
- St. Francis Xavier Cathedral (disambiguation)
- St. Francis Xavier (disambiguation)
