= Church of St. Francis Xavier-Catholic =

Church of St. Francis Xavier-Catholic may refer to:

- Church of St. Francis Xavier-Catholic (Benson, Minnesota), listed on the National Register of Historic Places in Swift County, Minnesota
- Church of St. Francis Xavier-Catholic (Grand Marais, Minnesota), listed on the National Register of Historic Places in Cook County, Minnesota

== See also ==
- Church of Saint Francis Xavier (disambiguation)
- St. Francis Xavier Church (disambiguation)
