= Portier =

Portier is a French surname meaning "porter". Notable people with the surname include:

- Alexandre Portier (born 1990), French politician
- Anthony Portier (born 1982), Belgian footballer
- Michael Portier (1795–1859), American Roman Catholic bishop
  - Bishop Portier House, Mobile, Alabama, United States
- Paul Portier (cinematographer), French cinematographer
- Paul Portier (physiologist) (1866 - 1962), French physiologist

See also

- Le Portier, a planned ward of the Principality of Monaco.
