= Lourdes Central School, Mangaluru =

Lourdes Central School

Location
- Bejai Church Road; Mangaluru; India

Information
- Motto: Peace Through Knowledge
- Religious affiliation: Roman Catholic
- Established: 1999
- Founder: Rev. Fr. Bernard D’Souza
- School district: Dakshina Kannada
- Ofsted: Reports
- Gender: Mixed
- Age: 3 to 18
- Website: http://www.lourdescentralschool.com/

Lourdes Central School is a coeducational school located in the Bejai locality of Mangaluru, India, adjacent to the St. Francis Xavier Church. It was founded in 1999 by the late Rev. Fr. Bernard D’Souza under the Catholic Board of Education, of the Diocese of Mangalore, a religious and linguistic minority institution.

== History ==
Fr. Bernard D'Souza initiated the project of providing Catholic students with an education in the CBSE syllabus in order to prepare them for competitive exams and also for children of Mangalorean Catholics abroad who require a CBSE education. He started English medium classes in kindergarten and Standard I in 1999 at the Bejai Church Commercial Complex. In the meantime the southern portion of the church-owned land was leveled. At the extreme end a large building was erected with three stories on the eastern end and with a single story at the western end. The Principal's office, school office, and six kindergarten class rooms were constructed on the ground floor. On the first floor, various other class rooms, a library, a computer room and an auditorium were built. The school received permission to conduct classes up to Standard IV, but only in the Kannada medium.

Fr. Bernard D'Souza was later transferred, and in May 2003, Fr. Joseph Peter Tauro was appointed parish priest of Bejai as well as the manager of Lourdes Central School. By then, the school had received permission to conduct classes up to Standard VI, in Kannada medium as per government policy. Thereafter an application was made for educating students in the English medium. Permission was granted by the government education department (No: 134-2003-04) on 28 November 2003 through the efforts of Sr. Benny Pinto. Shortly afterwards, the school received an NOC from the government dated 29 November 2003 to run under the CBSE syllabus. The school then applied for affiliation to the CBSE, New Delhi. The commission began the inspection of the school on 27 October 2004 to ensure conformity with the CBSE requirements. John Sharma of Ghaziabad, Fr. Cyril Sequeira of Meerut, and Vivian Sequeira of Bejai parish assisted the school authorities in the inspection. The Affiliation No. 830120/2005-06, dated 10 January 2005, was issued to the school with a validity of three years. In May 2011, all Lourdes Central candidates taking the class 12 CBSE exams passed.

Simultaneously, additional facilities were developed; two floors were constructed above the auditorium. On the second floor laboratories for physics, chemistry, biology, mathematics were built, as well as a computer room. A large library was also constructed. The remaining rooms on the second and third floors were developed as classrooms. On the third floor an A. V. room was made. Adjoining the school, an administrative block was built which housed the Principal's Chamber, a conference room and lobby on the ground floor and the Vice Principals office and staff room the first floor. The administrative block and all other facilities were blessed by Rev. Dr. Aloysius Paul D'Souza, Bishop of Mangalore and inaugurated by Mr. Oscar Fernandes, M.P. on 13 March 2005. The cost of developing these infrastructural facilities amounted to 1.5 crore rupees.

== Global School Partnership ==
Lourdes Central School has formulated an international partnership with Pilton Bluecoat C of E Junior School of Barnstaple, Devon, United Kingdom. In 2010, a team of both staff members and students visited the partner school in the UK under the Department for International Development (DFID) Programme.
