= Historic Roman Catholic Properties in Mobile Multiple Property Submission =

Multiple listing in the U.S. National Register of Historic Places

- U.S. National Register of Historic Places
- Location: Mobile, Alabama
- Coordinates: 30°41′24″N 88°2′44″W
- NRHP reference No.: 64500007

The Historic Roman Catholic Properties in Mobile Multiple Property Submission is a multiple property submission of Roman Catholic properties in Mobile, Alabama, that were listed together on the National Register of Historic Places. The submission covers cemetery, church, convent and other religious properties that are historically or architecturally significant.

Mobile was founded as the first capital of the French colony of Louisiana under the direction of Pierre Le Moyne d'Iberville. It was established by his brother, Jean-Baptiste Le Moyne, Sieur de Bienville, in 1702 to gain control over France's Louisiana claims. Mobile's Roman Catholic parish was established on July 20, 1703, by Jean-Baptiste de la Croix de Chevrières de Saint-Vallier, as a parish of the Diocese of Quebec. It was the first Catholic parish established on the Gulf Coast of the United States.

The Diocese of Mobile was established in 1829, with Michael Portier appointed its first bishop. During his thirty-year tenure he began many of the projects that led to what remains of Mobile's Catholic architectural and historical legacy. He was responsible for the Cathedral Basilica of the Immaculate Conception that still stands today and his own house. He also founded Spring Hill College, the oldest Catholic college in the Southeastern United States and the third-oldest Jesuit college in the United States. Catholicism remained the dominant form of Christianity in Mobile until the American Civil War. Protestantism grew in the city from then until World War II, when more than 89,000 people, mostly Protestant, moved into the city to work for war effort industries. From that point on Catholicism was a minority, although still sizable, denomination. The structures listed in this multiple property submission reflect the best-preserved reminders of this Catholic legacy.

Resource Name	Also known as	Coordinates	City	County	Added	Notes
Catholic Cemetery	Stone Street Cemetery	30°42′32″N 88°4′25″W	Mobile	Mobile County	July 3, 1991	
Convent and Academy of the Visitation	Visitation Monastery	30°41′38″N 88°5′38″W	Mobile	Mobile County	April 24, 1992	
Convent of Mercy	St. Francis Place Condominiums	30°41′20″N 88°3′10″W	Mobile	Mobile County	April 24, 1992	Converted to residential units
Saint Francis Xavier Roman Catholic Church		30°42′33″N 88°4′49″W	Mobile	Mobile County	July 3, 1991	
Saint Joseph's Roman Catholic Church		30°41′23″N 88°3′14″W	Mobile	Mobile County	July 3, 1991	
Saint Matthew's Catholic Church		30°39′46″N 88°3′28″W	Mobile	Mobile County	July 3, 1991	
Saint Vincent de Paul	Prince of Peace Church	30°40′56″N 88°2′42″W	Mobile	Mobile County	April 24, 1992	

== See also ==
- National Register of Historic Places Multiple Property Submissions in Alabama
