= Convent of Mercy =

Convent of Mercy could refer to:

- Convent of Mercy, Adelaide, whose chapel was designed by architect Walter Bagot in 1920
- Convent of Mercy (Mobile, Alabama)
- Convent of Mercy (Pittsburgh)
- Sisters of Mercy (disambiguation page)
