= Convent and Academy of the Visitation =

- U.S. National Register of Historic Places
- U.S. Historic district
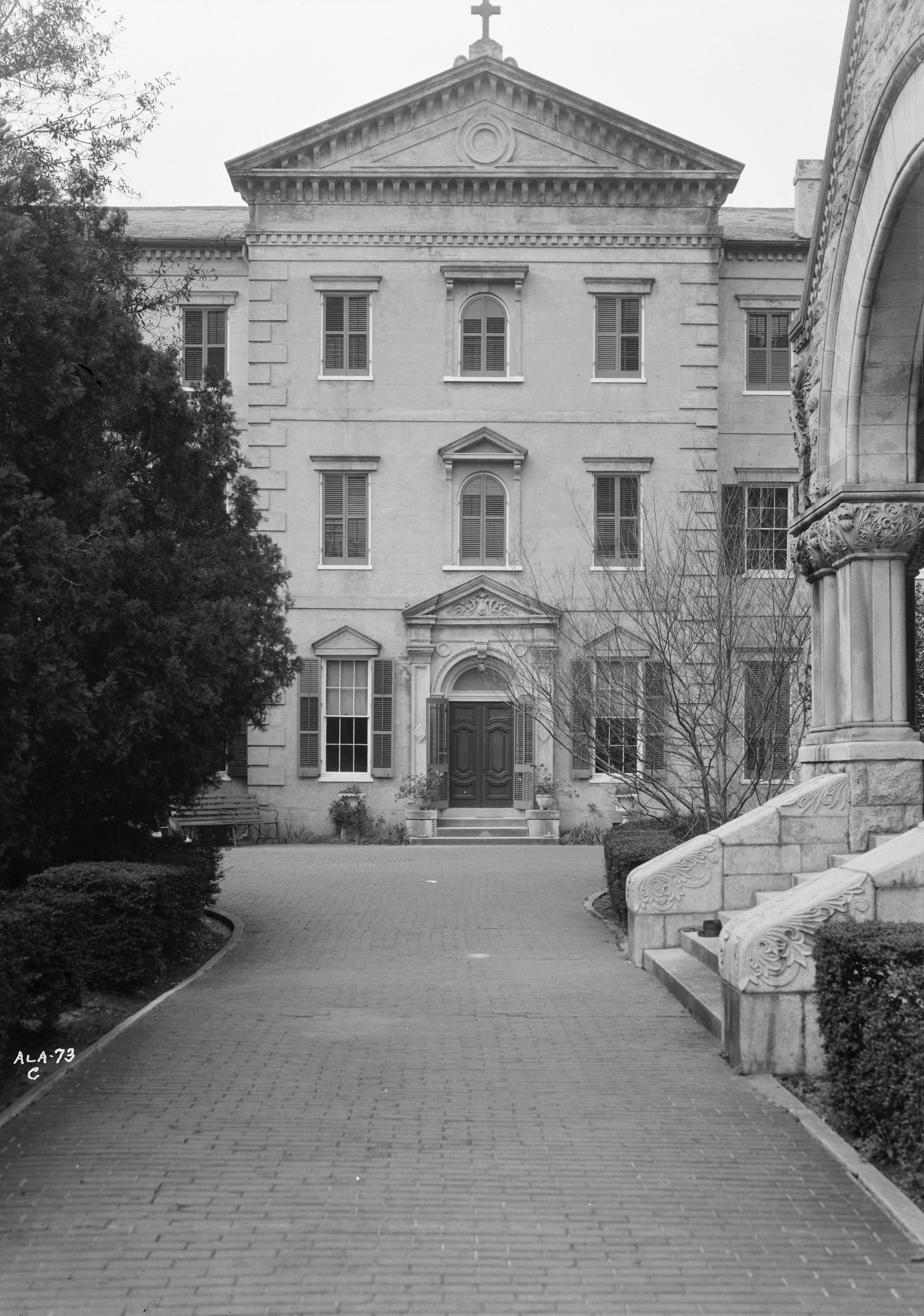
- The east building was built in 1855 and serves as the main entrance to the convent.

- Location within Mobile, Alabama Location within Alabama Location within the United States
- Location: 2300 Spring Hill Avenue; Mobile, Alabama
- Coordinates: 30°41′37.80″N 88°5′34.56″W
- Area: 11 acres (4.5 ha)
- Built: 1855; 1895; 1899
- Architect: James Henry Hutchisson
- Architectural style: French Renaissance, Romanesque Revival, Gothic Revival
- MPS: Historic Roman Catholic Properties in Mobile Multiple Property Submission
- NRHP reference No.: 91000844
- Added to NRHP: April 24, 1992

The Convent and Academy of the Visitation, properly known today as the Visitation Monastery, is a historic complex of Roman Catholic religious buildings and a small cemetery in Mobile, Alabama, United States. The buildings and grounds were documented by the Historic American Buildings Survey in 1937. They were added to the National Register of Historic Places on April 24, 1992, as a part of Historic Roman Catholic Properties in Mobile Multiple Property Submission. It, along with the Convent of Mercy, is one of two surviving historic convent complexes in Mobile.

== History ==
The Convent of the Visitation was founded by Bishop Michael Portier, the first bishop of Mobile. Portier wished to found a convent for the Order of the Visitation of Holy Mary so that they could provide education to girls in his diocese, due to a lack of schools. He obtained permission from Pope Gregory XVI for that purpose and in 1832 the first five sisters arrived from Georgetown.

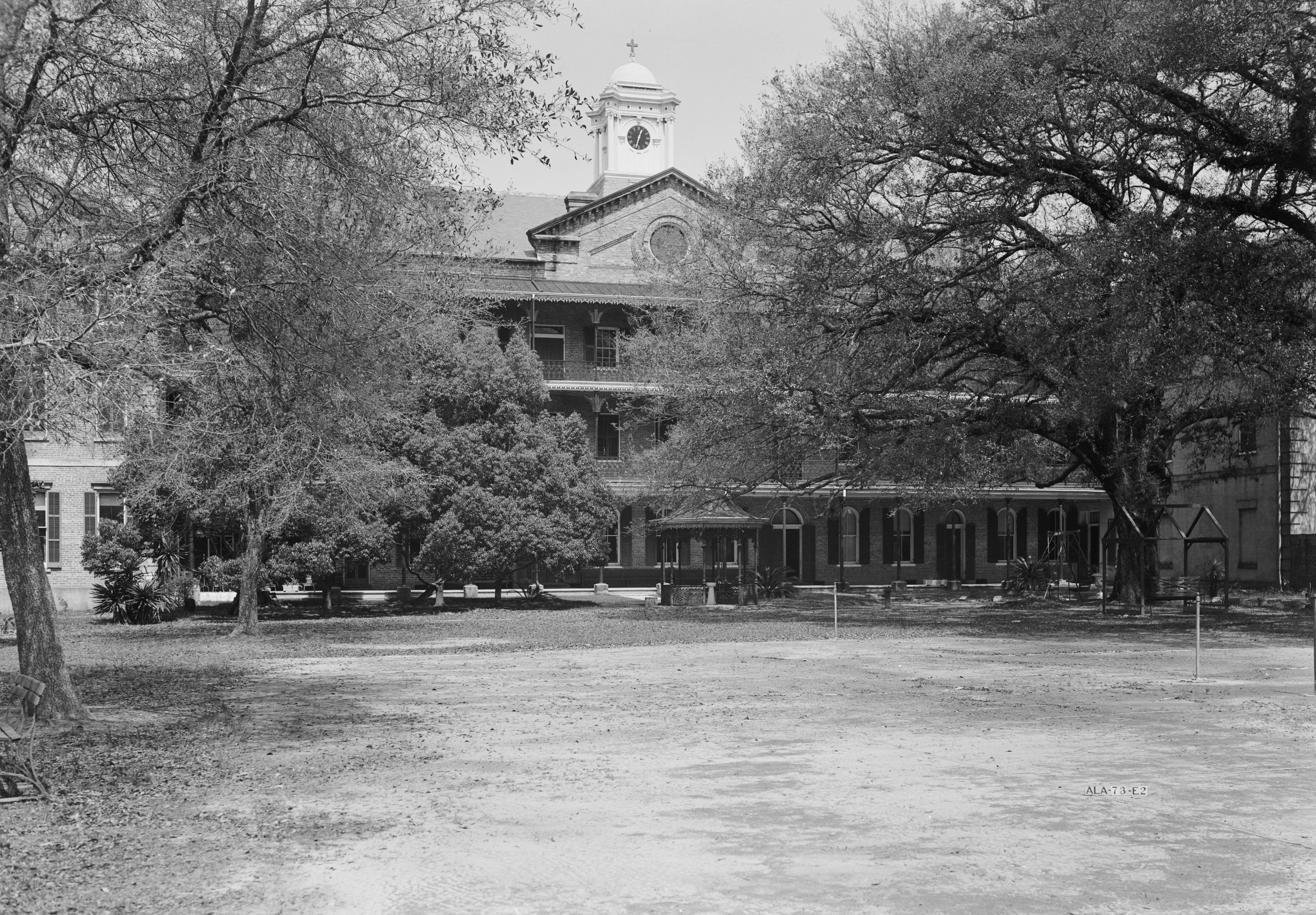
The south building in 1937, also part of the 1855 construction.

The academy taught 40 students the first year and enrollment continued to increase up until a fire in May 1854 destroyed the buildings. Rebuilding of the convent commenced one month after the fire with a new quadrangle of buildings that form the core of the convent to the present day. Architect James Henry Hutchisson designed these buildings in a French Renaissance style. They were completed in 1855.

The academy had grown to include a high school and grammar school by the early 1900s. They were housed in a three-story school building on the west side of the quadrangle, built in 1900. Both had closed by 1952 and the former school building was demolished in 1953. The sisters then began a retreat house. The retreat continues into the present, hosting retreat groups for men, women, and adolescents, as well as a variety of other events. Numerous major restoration efforts were undertaken from 1985 to 1991. The interiors of Sacred Heart Chapel were completely restored beginning in 1998 with rededication late in 1999.

== Description ==
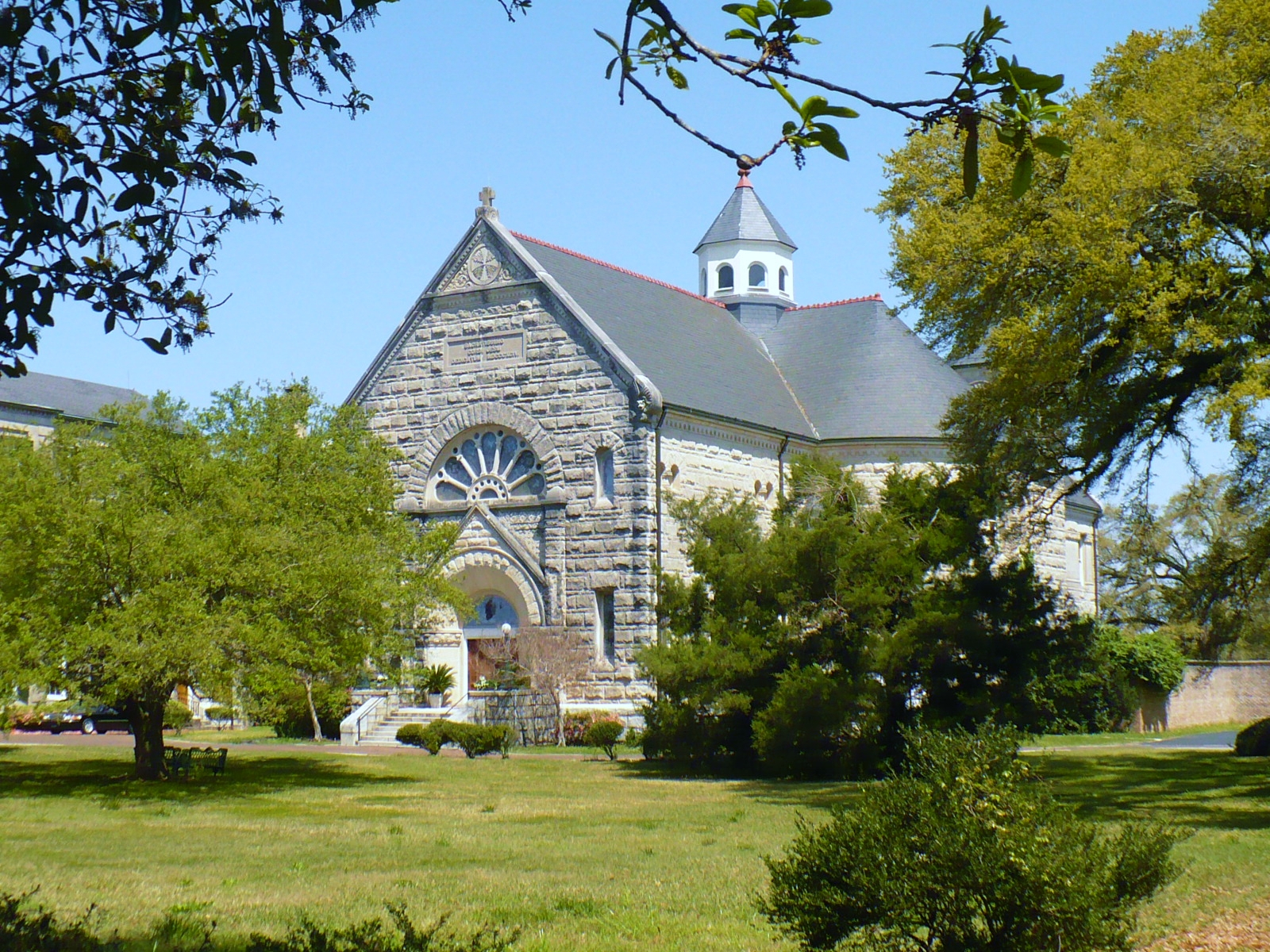
Sacred Heart Chapel

The major buildings include the quadrangle of French Renaissance Revival style buildings completed in 1855, in addition to several later structures. The Romanesque Revival Sacred Heart Chapel was completed on the grounds in 1895. A priest's house for visiting clerics was completed in 1899, in a stylistic blending of the Romanesque Revival and Gothic Revival styles. The grounds of the convent are enclosed with high brick walls, dating to the 1850s. In addition to the outer wall, inner walls separate the public and private areas of the main complex and also enclose a private cemetery for the Order of the Visitation. The graves are marked by simple white crosses.
