= USA Health Providence Hospital =

Hospital in Alabama, United States

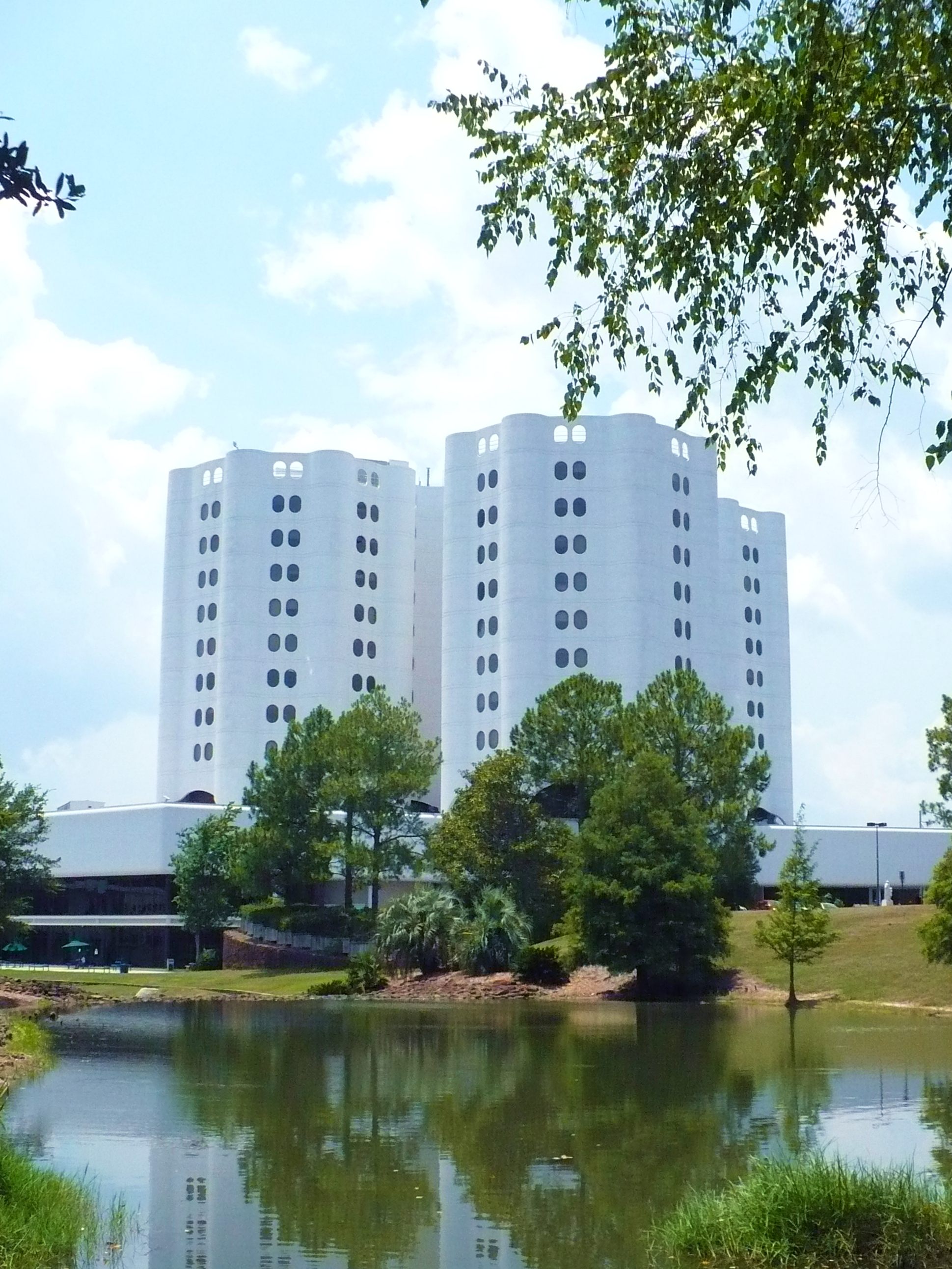
- North elevation in 2009

Geography
- Location: 6801 Airport Boulevard, Mobile, Alabama, U.S.
- Coordinates: 30°40′45″N 88°11′56″W

Organisation
- Care system: Non-profit Hospital
- Type: Teaching

Services
- Emergency department: Level III Trauma Center

History
- Founded: 1854

Links
- Website: https://www.usahealthsystem.com/locations/providence
- Lists: Hospitals in U.S.

USA Health Providence Hospital (also known as Providence Hospital, formerly Ascension Providence) is a 349-bed high-rise hospital in the U.S. city of Mobile, Alabama. The hospital tower was completed in 1987. The building sits at the center of a 277-acre (112 ha) campus, it rises approximately 170 feet (52 m) and 11 stories. It was designed by noted American architect Bertrand Goldberg, best known for the Marina City complex in Chicago.

== History ==
Providence Hospital was founded in 1854 by the Daughters of Charity from Emmitsburg, Maryland. Mobile's first bishop, Michael Portier, had asked the first four Sisters to come to Mobile in 1841 to care for orphans, following an outbreak of yellow fever. By 1852 the Sisters were under contract to administer the City Hospital of Mobile. This ended in 1854 when they resigned from the hospital. Their resignation came during a period of high anti-Catholic sentiment in the city, provoked by the local Know Nothing political movement. A board of local citizens was formed on August 15, 1854 to build a new hospital for the Sisters. They completed a new 60-bed hospital in 1855 at the intersection of Broad and St. Anthony Streets.

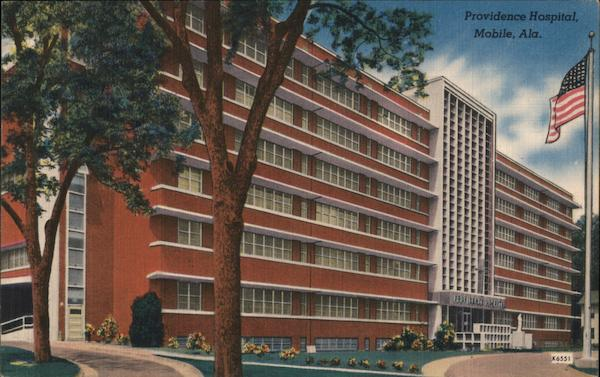
Postcard view of former Providence Hospital building, c 1950s

In 1902 the facility moved to a new Mediterranean Revival structure on an 11-acre (4.5 ha) Springhill Avenue campus. In 1904 they founded the second school of nursing to be established in Alabama. By the late 1940s the old 100-bed structure had been outgrown and a new building, in front of the old, was started in February 1949. The new 250-bed Modern-style structure was completed by October 1952.

That structure was also outgrown by the 1980s. The Sisters decided to move the hospital to a 250-acre (100 ha) site on the western boundary of the city. Bertrand Goldberg, known for his innovative hospital designs, was hired to design the new $60-million facility. It would be one of the last major hospital complexes designed by his firm. By this time Goldberg had completed a number of other healthcare facilities and had refined his innovative "bed-cluster pod." The pod, with its groups of rooms encircling a central nurse's station, increased the ability of nurses to see and access patients easily. Construction on the reinforced concrete high-rise structure began in 1982 and accepted its first patients on July 15, 1987.

In 1999, the Daughters of Charity National Health System and Sisters of St. Joseph Health System formed Ascension Health, later restructured and named Ascension. Providence Hospital joined Ascension in 1999. In 2017, Providence Hospital was renamed Ascension Providence, when the company renamed all its hospitals to include the Ascension name.

On April 18, 2023, it was announced The University of South Alabama Health Care Authority, also known as USA Health, agreed to purchase Providence Hospital and its clinics from St. Louis-based Ascension for $85 million. On October 1, 2023, The University of South Alabama announced the completion of the acquisition of Providence Hospital, making it part of USA Health, the university's academic health system.

== See also ==
- List of tallest buildings in Mobile
