= Bishop Portier House =

Historic house in Alabama, United States

- U.S. National Register of Historic Places
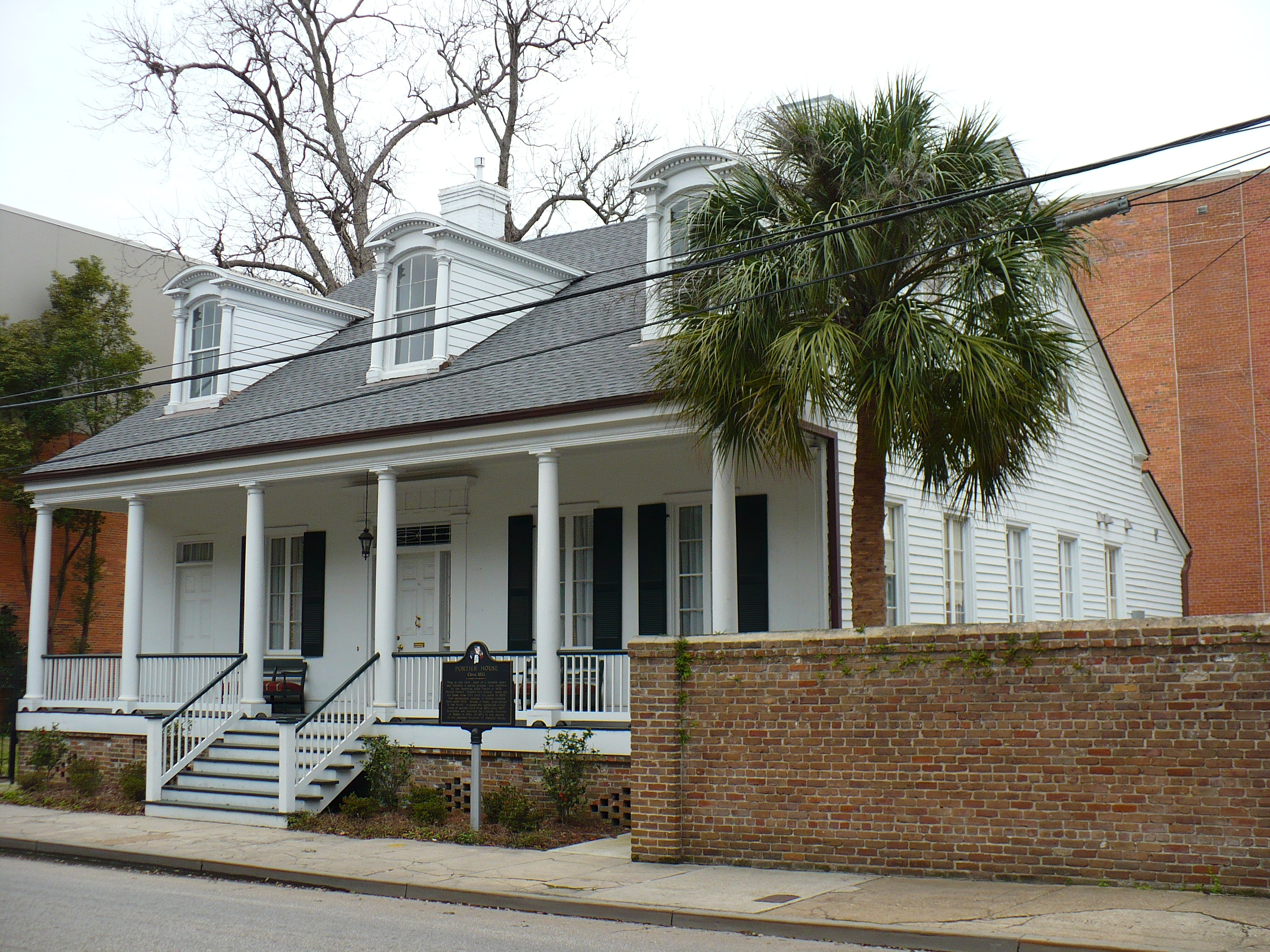
- The house in 2009

- Location within Mobile, Alabama Location within Alabama Location within the United States
- Location: 307 Conti Street; Mobile, Alabama
- Coordinates: 30°41′24″N 88°2′42″W
- Area: 0.4 acres (0.16 ha)
- Built: 1834
- Architect: Claude Beroujon
- Architectural style: Creole cottage with Federal details.
- MPS: Historic Roman Catholic Properties in Mobile Multiple Property Submission
- NRHP reference No.: 70000109
- Added to NRHP: February 26, 1970

The Bishop Portier House is a historic residence in Mobile, Alabama, United States. It sits diagonally across from the Cathedral of the Immaculate Conception, and faces Cathedral Square. It is owned by the Roman Catholic Archdiocese of Mobile. The house, built c. 1834, is one of Mobile's best surviving examples of a Creole cottage with neoclassical details. It was listed on the National Register of Historic Places on February 26, 1970, and subsequently was added to the Historic Roman Catholic Properties in Mobile Multiple Property Submission also.

== History ==
The house is named for Michael Portier, Mobile's first Roman Catholic bishop, who made this his home from 1834, until his death in 1859. The house was designed by Claude Beroujon, a seminarian architect and nephew of Portier. Four subsequent bishops resided here until 1906. Fr. Abram Ryan, poet-priest of the South, occupied the northwest corner room on the second floor from 1870, until 1877. The residence was restored by the archdiocese in 1958, and again in 2007. In 1970, it was placed on the National Register of Historic Places.

== Description ==
The structure is frame with clapboarding, and plastered gallery. It is one and one-half stories, with a square plan, and a center hall running from front to rear. It has a gabled roof encompassing full-length galleries, front and rear, on slender columns. There are three ornate dormers with classical detail. The center entrance is framed by pilasters, entablature, transom, and side lights.
