= Saint Joseph's Roman Catholic Church (Mobile, Alabama) =

Historic church in Alabama, United States

- U.S. National Register of Historic Places
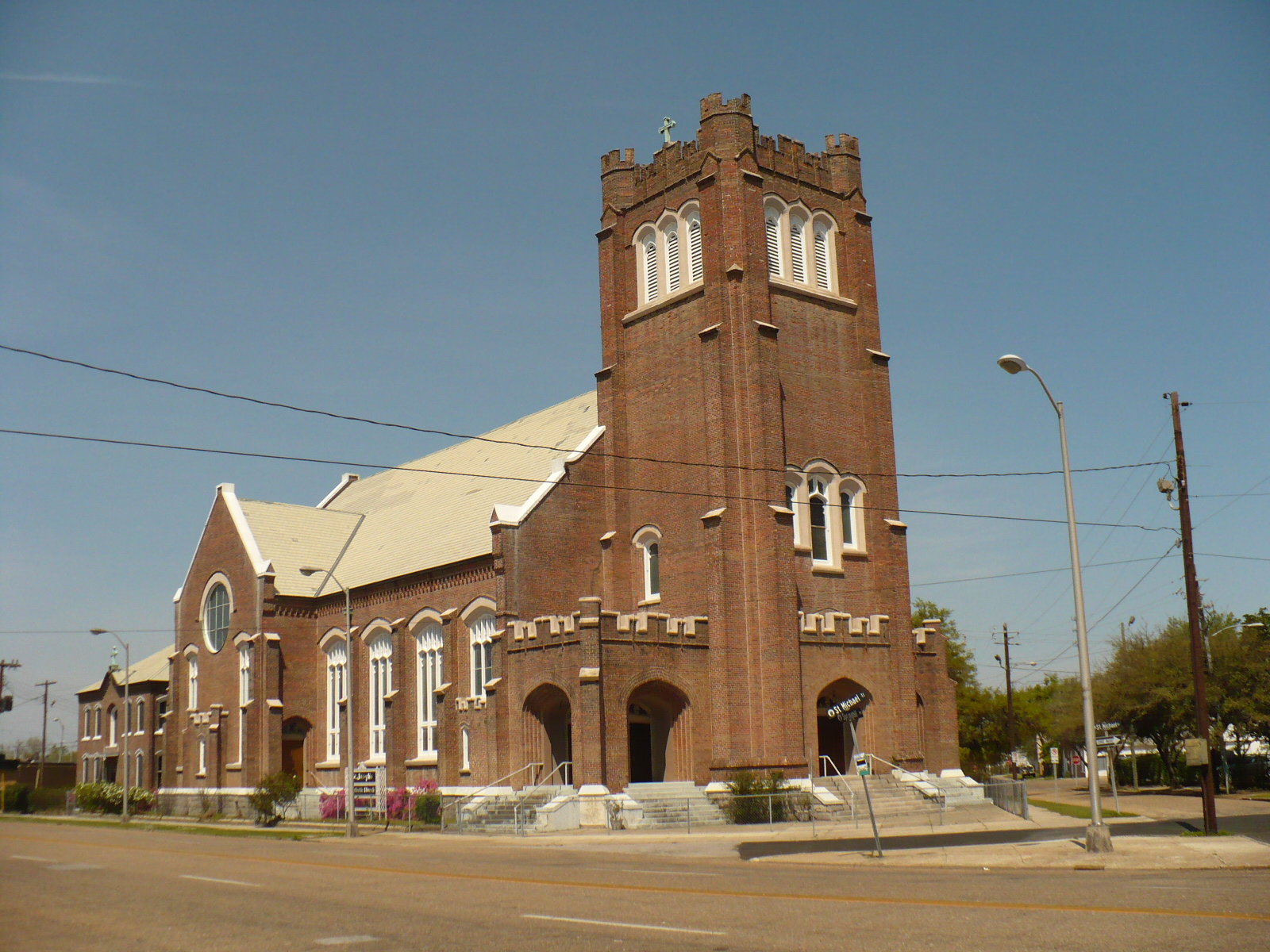
- Saint Joseph's Roman Catholic Church in 2008.

- Location within Alabama Location within the United States
- Location: Mobile, Alabama
- Coordinates: 30°41′23″N 88°3′14″W
- Built: 1907
- Architect: Diboll & Owen; Chamblin, G.A.
- Architectural style: Gothic Revival
- MPS: Historic Roman Catholic Properties in Mobile Multiple Property Submission
- NRHP reference No.: 91000841
- Added to NRHP: July 3, 1991

Saint Joseph's Roman Catholic Church was a historic Roman Catholic church building in Mobile, Alabama, United States. It served as the parish church for St. Joseph's Parish in the Roman Catholic Archdiocese of Mobile.

St. Joseph's Parish was the third oldest in Mobile. It was formed in 1857 to serve Catholics too far removed from the downtown Cathedral and the Church of St. Vincent de Paul in South Mobile.

St. Joseph's Parish was approaching its 160th year of service before its closure in 2018.

== History ==
Bishop Michael Portier appointed a Jesuit priest, Father Peter Ismand as the first pastor of St.Joseph Parish in the year 1857. Father Peter Ismand was a popular priest who ministered the soldiers of both the Confederacy and the Union Armed Forces. He was also very active during the Yellow Fever epidemic.

The Sisters of Mercy came to Mobile in 1884 for service in St. Joseph's Parish. Their social works mission included visiting the sick, the destitute and prisoners. They founded St. Joseph's School, later to be called the Convent of Mercy Academy. The convent was moved to another location in 1969.

Membership of the Parish began to swell and a need arose to plan and construct a larger Church. The present land at Springhill Avenue was purchased from the Prador family. The Jesuits of Spring Hill College were entrusted with the erection of a Church, which they built close to the city hospital in 1858.

The new parish was made up primarily of German immigrants. A magnificent church building with its soaring nave and spectacular, stained glass windows was designed in Gothic style. The corner stone was laid by the then Bishop Allen on August 8, 1907. Construction was completed within a year and the present sanctuary was dedicated on August 4, 1908.

In 1907 several organizations were established by the church under the leadership of Father Linus Schuler. Among these were: The Altar Society, The Holy Name Society, St. Vincent de Paul Conference, The Society for Propagation of Faith and The Holy Child Association.

In September 1908 the Mobile Daily Register wrote a short article about the newly completed church calling it "one of the handsomest churches in the state." The paper noted the lack of interior columns as a "striking feature" resulting in an "entirely open interior." The church has a seating capacity of 800.

The Jesuits continued to manage the Church and established an endowment to provide ongoing support for the Parish. In 2009 the Jesuits turned over management to the Archdioceses of Mobile.

== Architecture ==
Diboll and Owen of New Orleans were the architects and G. A. Chamblin of Mobile was the contractor.

The Church itself is an impressive example of the Gothic Revival style. It is sixty by one hundred feet/ brick with a granite water table and a one hundred and twenty foot tower. The building is a classic medieval reproduction with a gable (slate) to the front nave, a 120-foot centered square tower/ transepts and apse.

The facade is dominated by the tower, which has a central entrance of paired wooden doors with Tudor arch tops and corbeled in, battlemented parapet over the entrance. The tower features monumental buttresses with a set of tripled stained glass Tudor windows in the second story and tripled louvered vents in the third story.

The side elevations feature large Tudor stained glass windows delineated by buttresses. The transepts are buttressed and include each a pair of tall Tudor windows and large stained glass window above. There is a copper cross atop each transept.

The church is entered by the tower and double wooden doors and stained glass windows lead into the sanctuary. The interior consists of a large nave with four rows of pews and open transepts. The aisles are covered by low arches and a high arch covers the nave. There are no columns supporting these arches. The walls are clad with marble wainscoting. The stained glass windows (imported from Germany) are interspersed with the Stations of the Cross.

Lantern lights are suspended along each side of the nave. The marble chancery rail extends across the west end of the interior. The apse features free standing Corinthian columns with gilded capitals to either side and massive engaged Corinthian pillars behind. The marble altar is carved with a scene of the Last Supper and the high altar is marble as well with intricate carvings and spires.

Each transept includes a large round stained glass window with a niche below containing statuary. A small free standing semi-circular balcony over the main entrance includes organ pipes but no seating.

== Closure ==
In 2017, the Archdiocese of Mobile, Alabama announced its decision to permanently close St. Joseph Church after 109 years of operation. This decision was met with resistance from members of the church, who claimed that Archbishop Thomas Rodi had sold the church out from under them and made off with their historic artifacts and endowment fund. Financial records show that the endowment fund was over $2 million and that the parish had been financially stable, with almost $80,000 in income over expenses, before the decision to close it was made. Parishioners also alleged that Archbishop Rodi and their pastor, Msgr. Farmer, failed to provide the necessary documentation that would have allowed them to appeal the closure of the church. In 2018, St. Joseph was closed and sold, with the proceeds going to the Archdiocese. Many of the church's artworks were then removed and placed in the new St. Ignatius Church being built at the time.

== National Historic Register Significance ==
St. Joseph's Roman Catholic Church retains its integrity of location/ materials and design. The original Gothic cupolas atop the tower corners were destroyed by Hurricane Frederic in 1979. There are no other exterior changes of note. Interior integrity is excellent as well.

Saint Joseph's Roman Catholic Church is significant under National Register Criterion as an important high style example of the Second Gothic Revival in Mobile. The high style design, quality materials and workmanship are typical of Catholic architectural endeavors in the city. The property is further significant for the Rectory, contemporary with the church and stylistically compatible through its details. No other rectory in the city is so architecturally similar to its church as this one.

The building was placed on the National Register of Historic Places on July 3, 1991 as part of the Historic Roman Catholic Properties in Mobile Multiple Property Submission.
