= Saint Matthew's Catholic Church (Mobile, Alabama) =

Historic church in Alabama, United States

- U.S. National Register of Historic Places
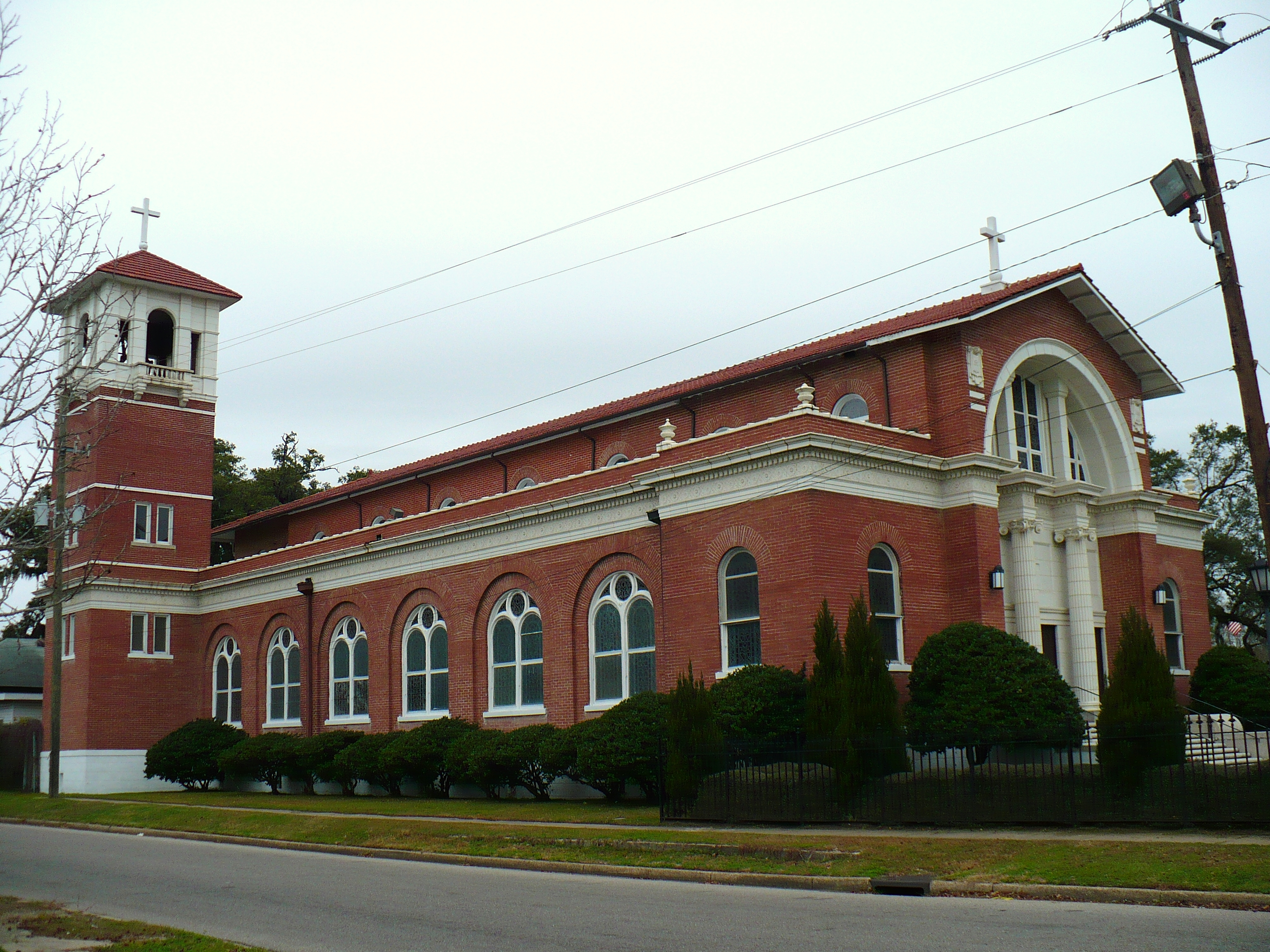
- The church in 2009

- Location within Mobile, Alabama Location within Alabama Location within the United States
- Location: 1200 South Marine Street; Mobile, Alabama; United States
- Coordinates: 30°39′46″N 88°3′28″W
- Built: 1913
- Architectural style: Mediterranean Revival
- MPS: Historic Roman Catholic Properties in Mobile Multiple Property Submission
- NRHP reference No.: 91000840
- Added to NRHP: July 03, 1991

Saint Matthew's Catholic Church is a historic Roman Catholic church building in Mobile, Alabama. It was built in the Mediterranean Revival style in 1913, shortly after its parish was founded. The building was placed on the National Register of Historic Places on July 3, 1991, as a part of the Historic Roman Catholic Properties in Mobile Multiple Property Submission.
