= Chippewa City, Minnesota =

Ghost town in Minnesota, United States

Chippewa City
- Ghost town
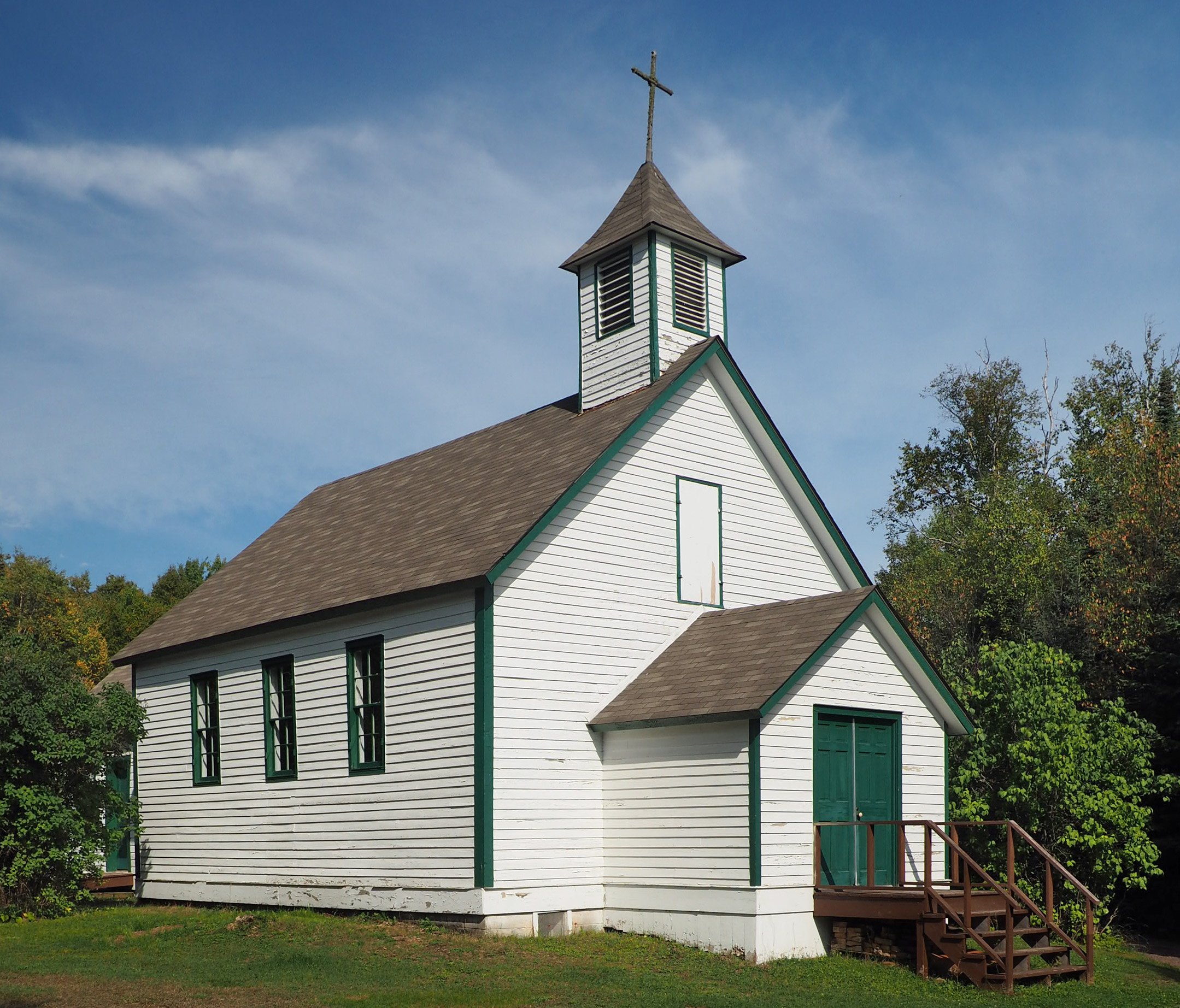
- The St. Francis Xavier Church in Chippewa City

- Location within Minnesota
- Coordinates: 47°45′35″N 90°18′07″W
- Country: United States
- State: Minnesota
- County: Cook
- Elevation: 669 ft (204 m)
- Time zone: UTC-6 (Central (CST))
  - Summer (DST): UTC-5 (CDT)
- Area code: 218
- GNIS feature ID: 655713

Chippewa City is an abandoned townsite in Cook County, Minnesota, United States.

The community was located 1.5 miles northeast of downtown Grand Marais on Minnesota Highway 61.

== History ==
Chippewa City thrived in the 1890s, with about 100 families living in the village. It was thought that this town would never dwindle. However, much of this community's room for housing was removed when Highway 61 entered it. The land was opened up to a settlement in 1854 with the signing of the Treaty of LaPointe by the Chiefs of the Indian Peace Commission. In accordance with the treaty, the land was given to Chippewa native Francis Rousain, who then sold it to another Chippewa, D. George Morrison, who then sold it to Eber E. Bly, who by 1873 sold it to Henry Mayhew.

The St. Francis Xavier Church, maintained by the Cook County Historical Society, and on the National Register of Historic Places, is located within the community.
