= St. Vincent de Paul Catholic Church (Mobile, Alabama) =

Historic church in Alabama, United States

- U.S. National Register of Historic Places
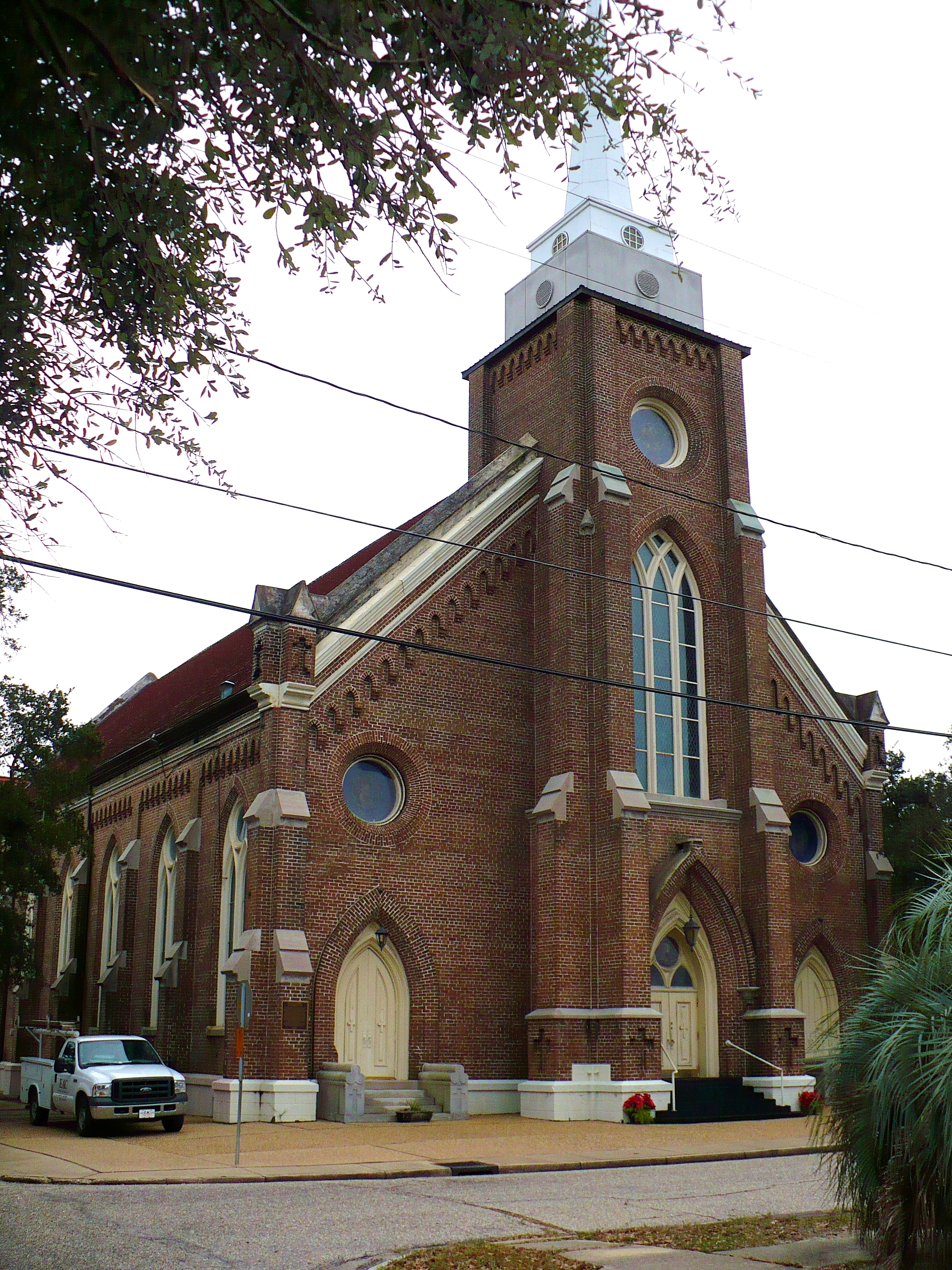
- The church in 2009

- Location within Mobile, Alabama Location within Alabama Location within the United States
- Location: 351 S. Lawrence Street; Mobile, Alabama; United States
- Coordinates: 30°40′56″N 88°2′42″W
- Built: 1874
- Architect: Hutchisson, James H.
- Architectural style: Gothic Revival
- MPS: Historic Roman Catholic Properties in Mobile Multiple Property Submission
- NRHP reference No.: 91000839
- Added to NRHP: April 24, 1992

St. Vincent de Paul Catholic Church, now known as Prince of Peace Catholic Church, is a historic Catholic church in Mobile, Alabama. It was designed by a local architect, James H. Hutchisson, in the Gothic Revival style.

The current building was built in 1874 and dedicated on January 21, 1877. It replaced an earlier frame structure that had been completed in 1847 and burned prior to the erection of this building. This building was originally the parish church for Saint Vincent de Paul Parish. A Ludowici clay tile roof was first installed on the building around 1918, and later repaired with new tile from the same manufacturer after damage caused by Hurricane Frederic.

The neighboring Black parish, St. Peter Claver, was established in 1911. On December 25, 1970 these two parishes were combined to form Prince of Peace. A new St. Vincent de Paul Parish was then established in western Mobile County to serve the Tillmans Corner area.

The original church was placed on the National Register of Historic Places on April 24, 1992, as a part of the Historic Roman Catholic Properties in Mobile Multiple Property Submission.
