= St. Francis Xavier Cathedral =

St. Francis Xavier Cathedral may refer to:

== Australia ==
- St Francis Xavier's Cathedral, Adelaide
- St Francis Xavier's Cathedral, Geraldton
- St Francis Xavier's Cathedral, Wollongong

== Bahamas ==
- St. Francis Xavier Cathedral, Nassau

== Belarus ==
- St. Francis Xavier Cathedral, Grodno

== Canada ==
- St Francis Xavier Cathedral, Chicoutimi

== India ==
- St. Francis Xavier Cathedral, Agartala
- St. Francis Xavier's Cathedral, Bangalore
- St. Francis Xavier's Cathedral, Kottar

== Indonesia ==
- St. Francis Xavier Cathedral, Ambon

== Japan ==
- St. Francis Xavier Cathedral, Kagoshima
- St. Francis Xavier Cathedral, Kyoto

== Pakistan ==
- St. Francis Xavier Cathedral, Hyderabad

== Philippines ==
- St. Francis Xavier Cathedral, Kabankalan

== Slovakia ==
- St. Francis Xavier Cathedral (Banská Bystrica, Slovakia)

== United States ==
- St. Francis Xavier Cathedral (Alexandria, Louisiana), Louisiana
- St. Francis Xavier Cathedral and Library, Indiana
- Saint Francis Xavier Cathedral (Green Bay, Wisconsin)

== See also ==
- St. Francis Xavier Church (disambiguation)
