= Convent of Mercy (Mobile, Alabama) =

- U.S. National Register of Historic Places
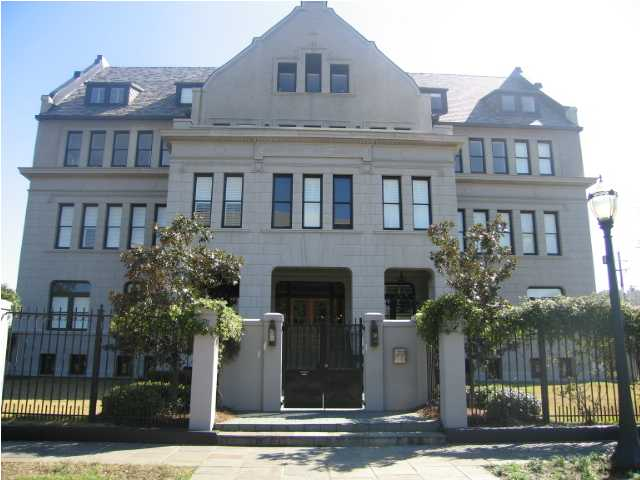
- The property in March 2008.

- Location within Mobile, Alabama Location within Alabama Location within the United States
- Location: 753 St. Francis St., Mobile, Alabama
- Coordinates: 30°41′19.54″N 88°3′9.84″W
- Area: 2 acres (0.81 ha)
- Built: 1908
- Architect: A. H. Downey
- Architectural style: Late 19th And 20th Century Revivals, Early English Baroque Revival
- MPS: Historic Roman Catholic Properties in Mobile Multiple Property Submission
- NRHP reference No.: 91000845
- Added to NRHP: April 24, 1992

The Convent of Mercy, known today as the St. Francis Place Condominiums, is a small complex of historic Roman Catholic religious buildings in Mobile, Alabama, United States. It consists of two buildings, the former convent and the former school. They were added to the National Register of Historic Places on April 24, 1992 as a part of the Historic Roman Catholic Properties in Mobile Multiple Property Submission. It, along with the Convent and Academy of the Visitation, is one of two surviving historic convent complexes in Mobile.

== History ==
The Sisters of Mercy first came to Mobile in 1884 with the new bishop, Dominic Manucy, for service in St. Joseph's Parish. Their social works mission included visiting the sick in their homes, the destitute in the poorhouse and the imprisoned in the jails. They also performed instruction in schools and prepared sacramentals. They founded St. Joseph's School, later to be called the Convent of Mercy Academy, in St. Joseph's Parish in 1895. St. Joseph School was initially taught in five frame buildings on the property, with one as the residence of the Sisters.

The cornerstone for a new 3 1/2-story Baroque Revival–style building was laid on September 8, 1908. It was designed by architect A. H. Downey as a combination convent and school to replace the former frame structures. The student body grew over the next two decades to the extent that a new 3-story brick building was built to the rear of the existing building in 1928. It would serve as the school, while the 1908 building would serve as the convent. The school closed in 1968 and the Sisters moved their convent to another Mobile location in 1969. The former school building served to house the Empress Chandelier Company for a time. Then, in 2002, the complex was restored and renovated to house the St. Francis Place Condominiums.
