= St. Francis Xavier Church, Dresden =

Demolished church in Dresden, Germany

Coordinates: 51°03′42″N 13°44′44″E

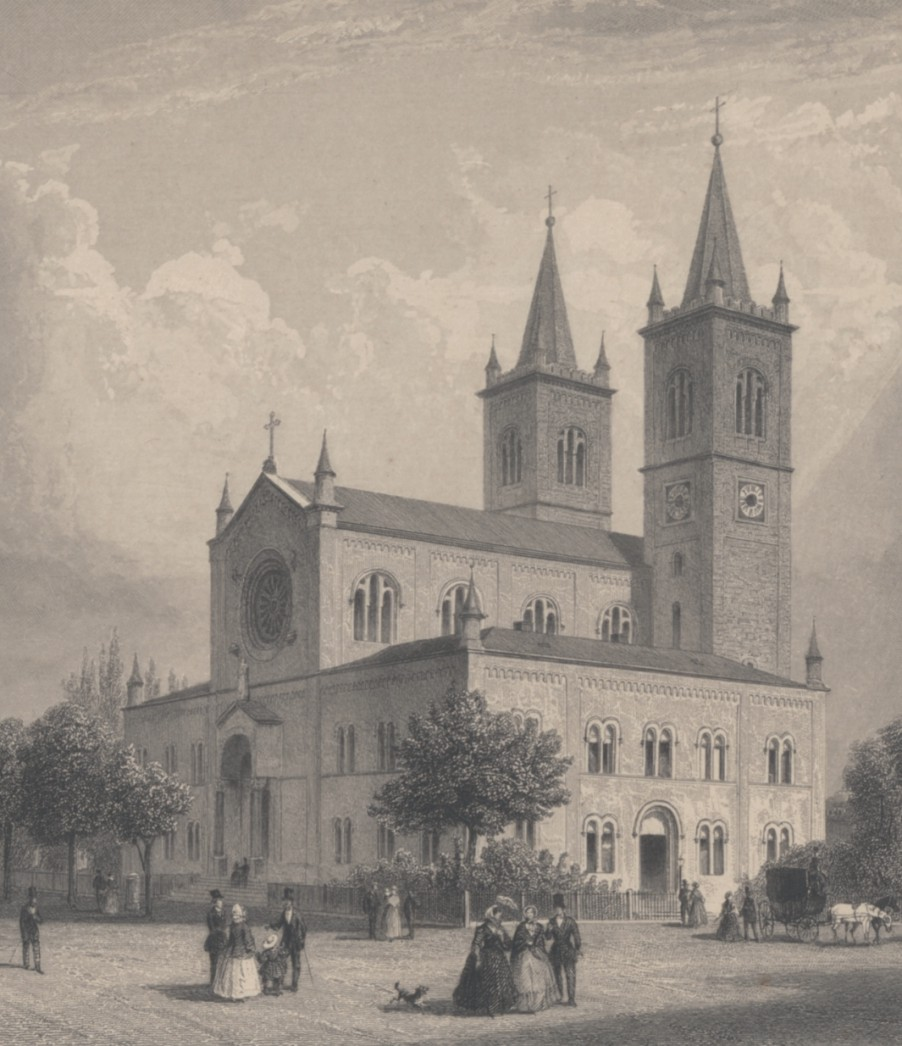
The St Francis Xavier Church in 1856.

The St Francis Xavier Church (katholische Kirche St. Franziskus Xaverius or Katholische Pfarrkirche zu Dresden-Neustadt) was a Roman Catholic church dedicated to St Francis Xavier in the Innere Neustadt district of Dresden. It was built from 1852 to 1853, severely damaged by bombing in 1945 in the Second World War, and demolished in 1957.
