= Saint Francis Xavier Roman Catholic Church (Mobile, Alabama) =

Historic church in Alabama, United States

- U.S. National Register of Historic Places
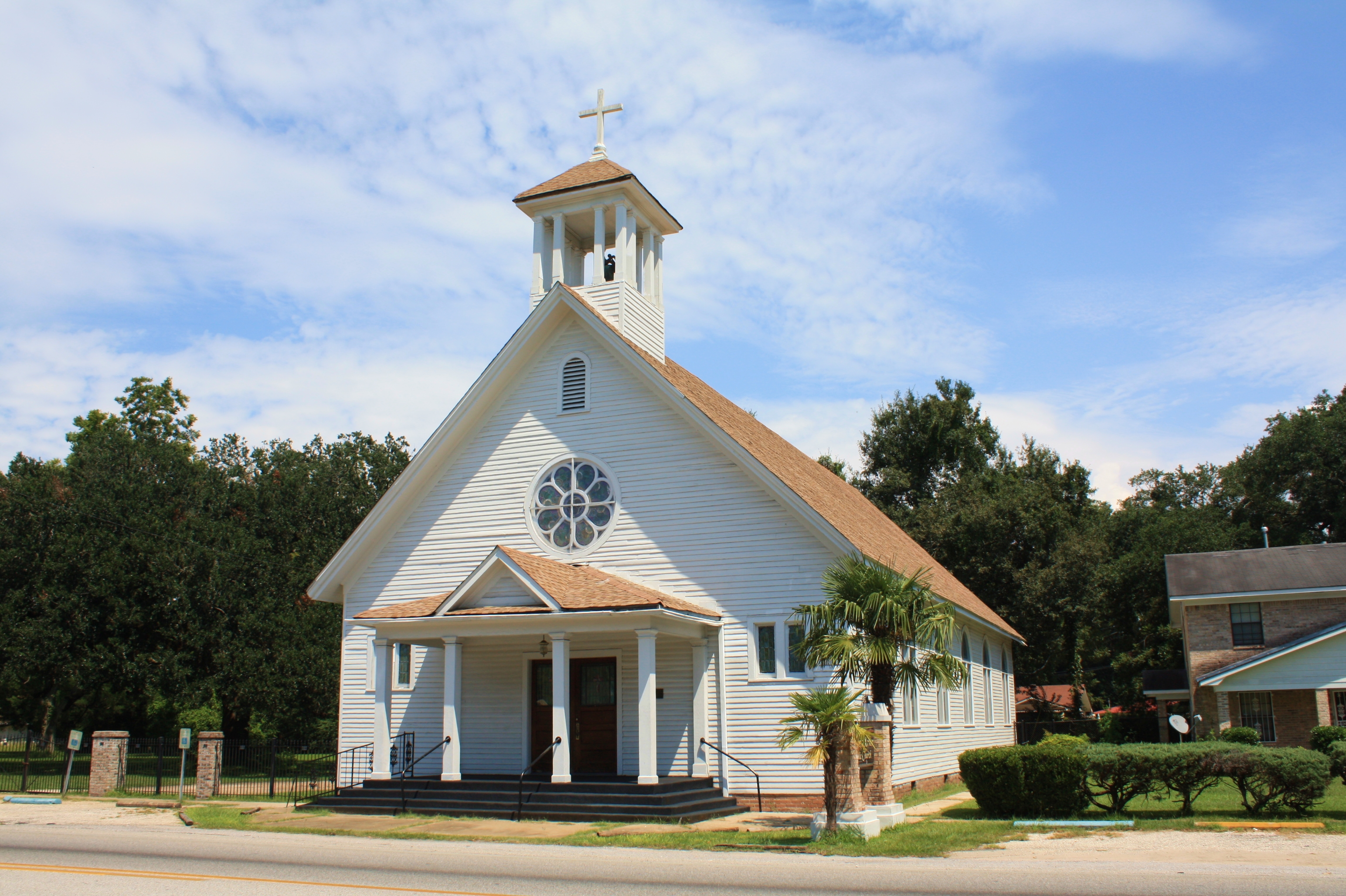

- Location within Mobile, Alabama Location within Alabama Location within the United States
- Location: 2034 St. Stephens Road; Mobile, Alabama
- Coordinates: 30°42′34″N 88°4′49″W
- Built: 1916
- Architectural style: Vernacular religious
- MPS: Historic Roman Catholic Properties in Mobile Multiple Property Submission
- NRHP reference No.: 91000842
- Added to NRHP: July 03, 1991

Saint Francis Xavier Roman Catholic Church, also known as St. Francis Xavier Church, is a historic Roman Catholic church building in the Toulminville neighborhood of Mobile, Alabama, United States. It serves as the parish church for St. Francis Xavier Parish in the Roman Catholic Archdiocese of Mobile. St. Francis Xavier Parish was established in 1868. The vernacular style building was completed in 1916, replacing a previous structure destroyed in a hurricane. It was placed on the National Register of Historic Places on July 3, 1991, as part of the Historic Roman Catholic Properties in Mobile Multiple Property Submission.
