= St. Francis Xavier Church, Mangaluru =

Roman Catholic Church in Mangaluru, India

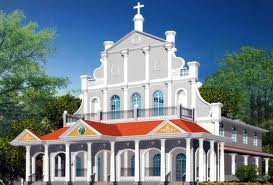
Bejai Church

St. Francis Xavier Church, commonly referred to as Bejai Church, is a historic Roman Catholic Church situated in the Bejai locality of Mangaluru. The church was built in 1869 on a plot of land measuring 5.37 acres at Bejai, which was obtained from the British government on 21 November 1869. The original structure was a chapel from which Sunday masses were offered.

== History ==
The area of Bejai was covered by the Cathedral parish for around two centuries. The construction of the chapel in Bejai was organised to reduce the inconvenience to Mangalorean Catholic residents of that area, who otherwise would have to travel a large distance to attend Mass. Sunday masses were offered by priests from the cathedral.

On 22 March 1912, the chapel was provided with a resident chaplain, Fr. Sebastian Noronha, by Bishop Paul Perini S. J. Fr. Sebastian undertook the effort to establish a primary school for Mangalorean Catholic youth, namely the St. Francis Xavier School for Boys and Lourdes Girls School, in the year 1915. He was succeeded by Fr. Joseph Peter Fernandes, who built a portion of the presbytery in 1920. The present church was built by Fr. A. E. C. Colaco in 1928. He also completed the presbytery, constructed the school building and planned the belfry, which was completed by Fr. Leo Saldana in 1937. In 1963, a girls high school was opened by the Ursuline Franciscan sisters with the assistance of the very Rev. Mgr. F. J. M. Pinto, which provided education up to the 10th Standard. After 1963, there was a relative lack of development.

=== 1995–2003 ===
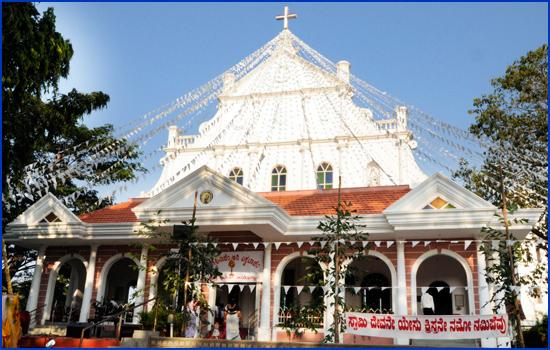
The church decorated for a festival

Fr. Bernard L. D'Souza came to Bejai church as a parish priest in 1995, and soon commenced developmental activities. The extreme western portion of the cemetery was levelled, permanent graves were shifted to a higher area, the ground was levelled and a community hall in an area of 35 cents was raised with 52 cents parking place. The hall was built within a period of one year and was inaugurated in December 1997. Bejai Church Hall currently has a capacity of 1000 seats, a stage, a gallery of 100 seats, a veranda and in the basement a mini hall with a sound system and seating capacity of 200 seats behind the stage. The total cost of construction was 7.5 million rupees.

=== 2003 onwards ===
The next major development conducted by Fr. Bernard was the Bejai Church Commercial Complex in 1998, which has become a hub of economic activity in the area. In May 2003, Fr. Joseph Peter Tauro was appointed parish priest of Bejai and manager of Lourdes Central School. Shortly afterwards the school was approved for affiliation with the CBSE in New Delhi.

The Bejai Church parish celebrated its centenary year in 2011. It currently serves 1,250 families, and a total of around 6000 Catholics in Bejai.
