= Church of St. Francis Xavier (Grand Marais, Minnesota) =

Historic church in Minnesota, United States

- U.S. National Register of Historic Places
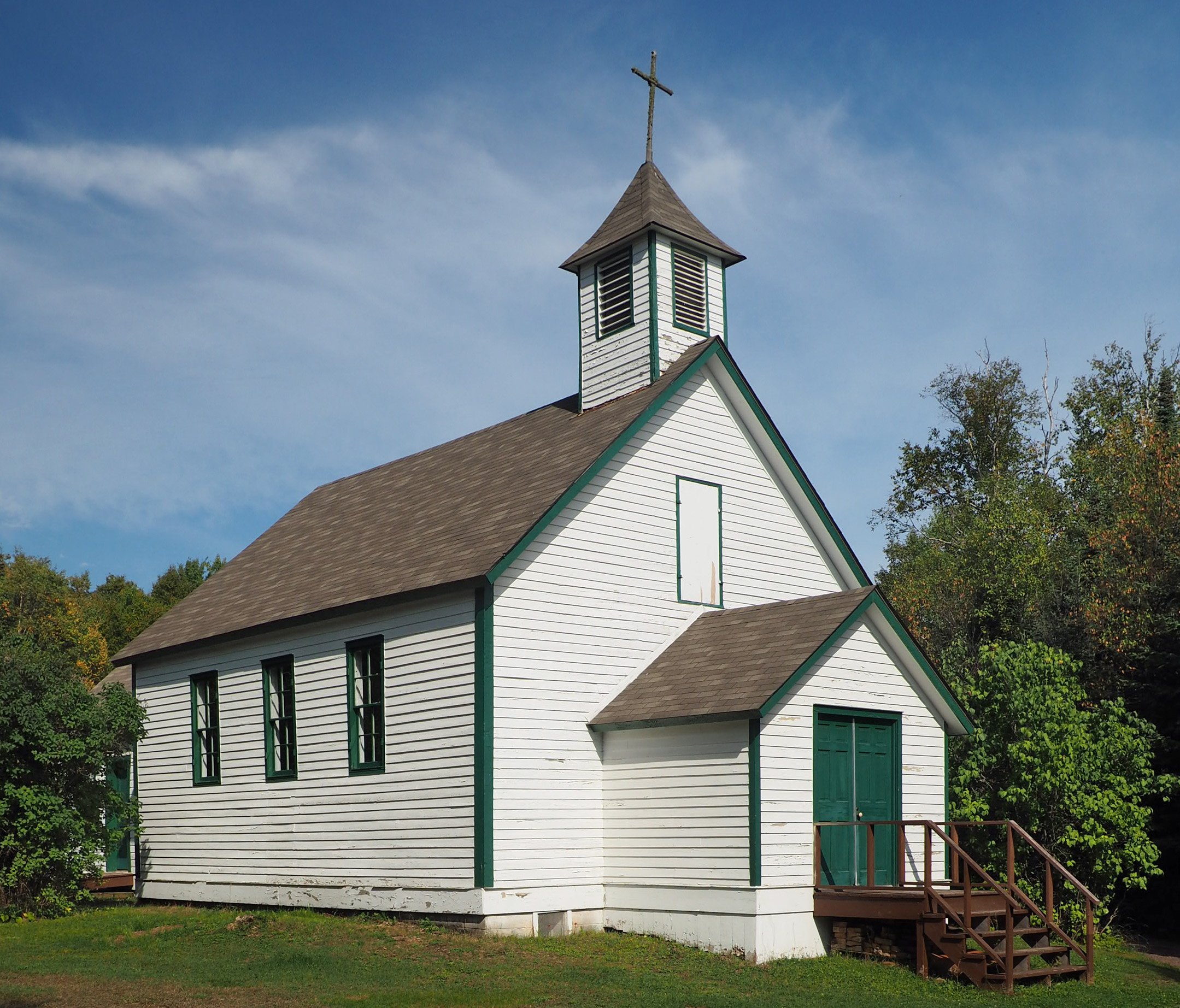
- The Church of St. Francis Xavier from the southwest

- Location within Minnesota Location within the United States
- Location: 1382 Minnesota Highway 61, Grand Marais, Minnesota
- Coordinates: 47°45′29″N 90°18′42.7″W
- Area: less than one acre
- Built: 1895
- NRHP reference No.: 86002119
- Added to NRHP: July 31, 1986

Church of St. Francis Xavier is a historic church on Minnesota Highway 61 in Grand Marais, Minnesota, United States. The church began as a Jesuit mission from Fort William, Ontario, in 1855 to minister to the Ojibwe residents of the area. The permanent structure was built in 1895 and was used until declining attendance forced it to close in 1936. The Cook County Historical society restored the site between 1970 and 1974 and it was added to the National Register in 1986. The church is located in the abandoned townsite of Chippewa City.

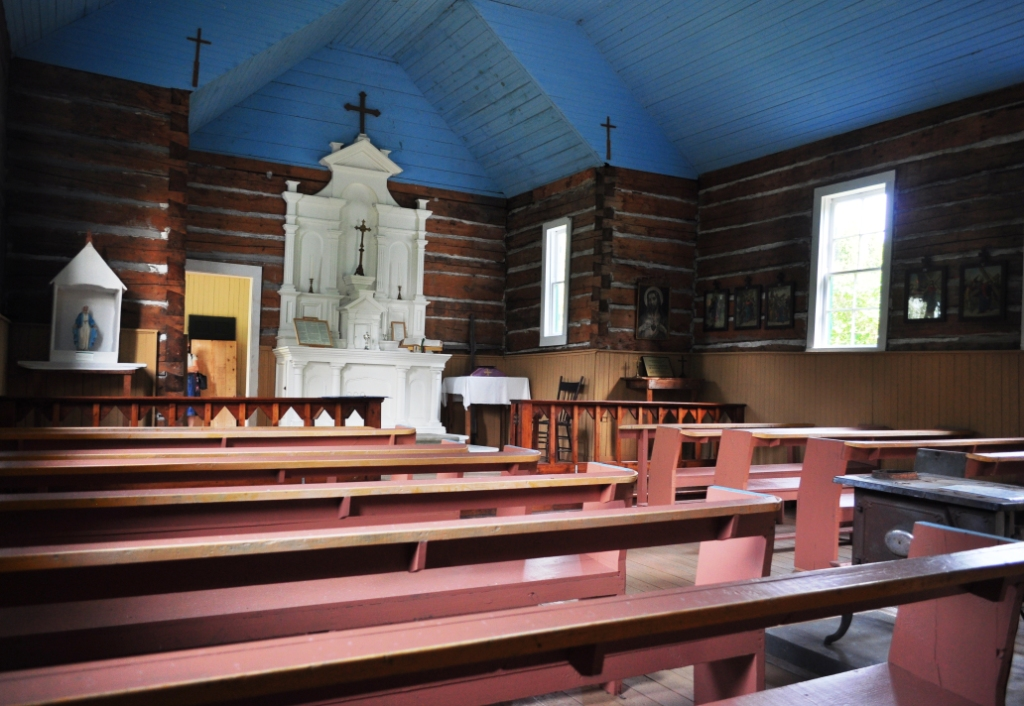
Church interior
