= Church of St. Francis Xavier (Benson, Minnesota) =

Historic church in Minnesota, United States

- U.S. National Register of Historic Places
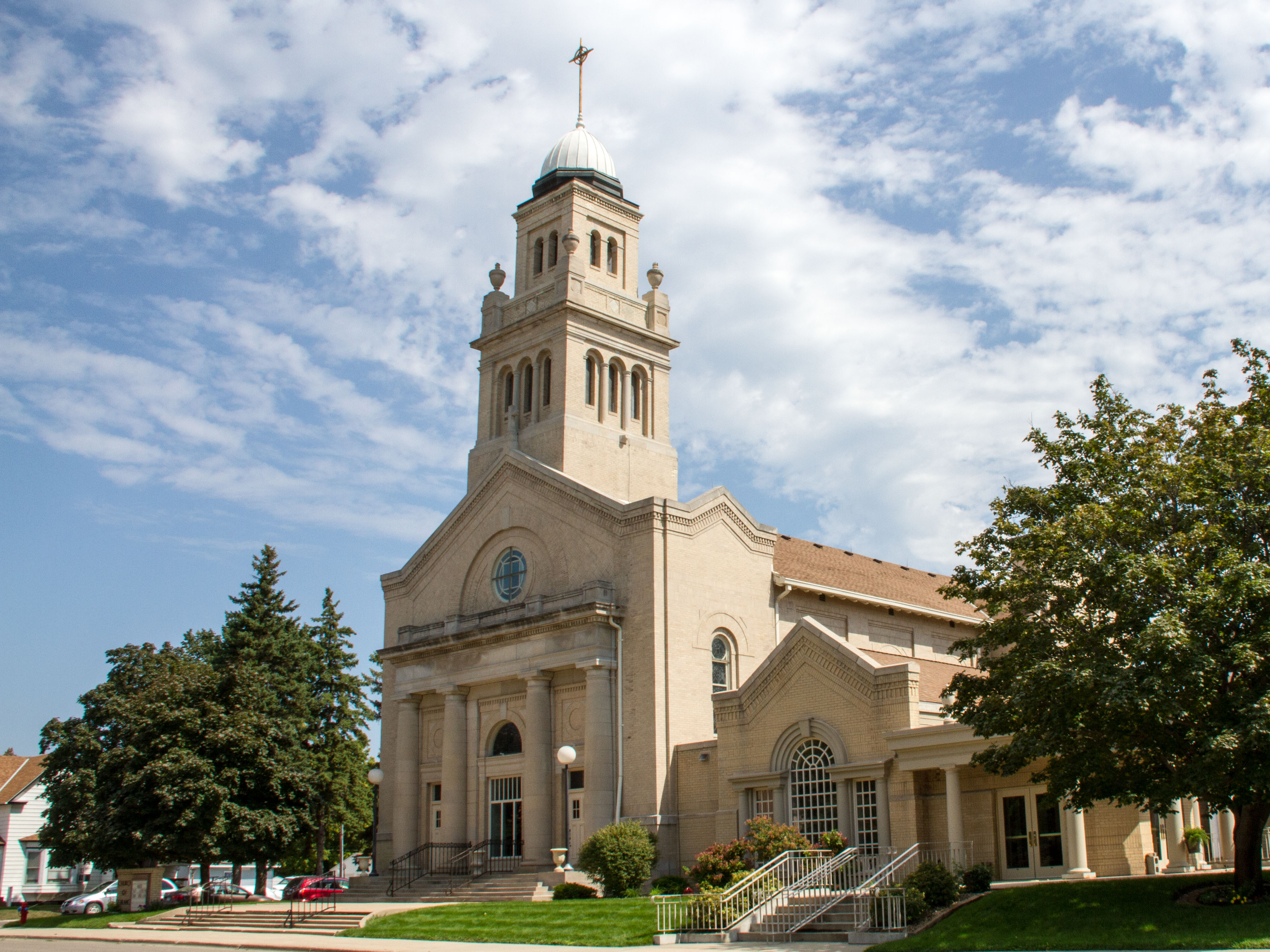
- The Church of St. Francis Xavier from the west

- Location within Minnesota Location within the United States
- Location: 508 13th Street North, Benson, Minnesota
- Coordinates: 45°19′6″N 95°35′52″W
- Area: Less than one acre
- Built: 1917
- Built by: Wilber Fallis and John Engstrom
- Architect: Emmanuel Louis Masqueray
- Architectural style: Renaissance Revival
- NRHP reference No.: 85001753
- Designated: August 15, 1985

The Church of St. Francis Xavier (St. Francis for short) is a Roman Catholic church in Benson, Minnesota, United States. The parish was founded in 1881 and its current building was designed by architect Emmanuel Louis Masqueray and constructed in 1917. St. Francis's building was listed on the National Register of Historic Places in 1985 for having local significance in the themes of architecture and European ethnic heritage. It was nominated for being one of west-central Minnesota's most architecturally sophisticated churches, for its Renaissance Revival design by Masqueray, and for its association with a parish of Swift County's late-19th-century Catholic settlers.

The parish is now part of St. Isidore the Farmer Area Faith Community, which also includes St. John in Appleton, St. Malachy in Clontarf, St. Bridget in De Graff, Sacred Heart in Murdock, and Visitation Oratory in Danvers.

== See also ==
- List of Catholic churches in the United States
- National Register of Historic Places listings in Swift County, Minnesota
