= Michael Portier =

Catholic bishop (1795–1859)

His Excellency, The Most Reverend Michael Portier
- Bishop of Mobile
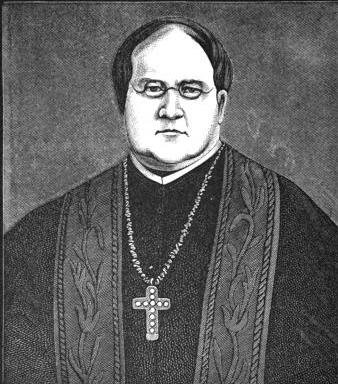
- Church: Catholic Church
- See: Diocese of Mobile
- In office: May 15, 1829 – May 14, 1859
- Successor: John Quinlan

Orders
- Ordination: May 16, 1818
- Consecration: August 26, 1825

Personal details
- Born: September 7, 1795 Montbrison, France
- Died: May 14, 1859 (aged 63) Mobile, Alabama, United States

Styles of Michael Portier
- Reference style: The Most Reverend
- Spoken style: His Excellency
- Religious style: Monsignor
- Posthumous style: not applicable

Michael Portier (September 7, 1795, Montbrison, France – May 14, 1859, Mobile, Alabama) was an American Catholic bishop who served as the first Bishop of Mobile from 1829 until his death in 1859.

Portier emigrated from France in 1817, and was ordained thereafter in the United States. He later founded many parishes and Catholic institutions in Alabama and Florida, particularly in Mobile. Among them was Providence Hospital. He also recruited religious orders of men and women to teach and care for parishioners. He is also one of several early American Catholic bishops to have owned slaves.

== Biography ==
Michel Portier was born in Montbrison in the diocese of Lyon, France. He was a student at the seminary in Lyon when recruited by Bishop Louis William Valentine Dubourg for the American mission. He emigrated to the United States at the age of 22 in 1817 with the goal of becoming a priest. He sailed from Bordeaux with Dubourg and about thirty companions on the French ship of war Caravane and landed after sixty-five days at Annapolis, Maryland on 4 September 1817. Upon arrival, they stayed for nearly two months under the hospitality of Charles Carroll of Carrollton.

=== Vicar general ===
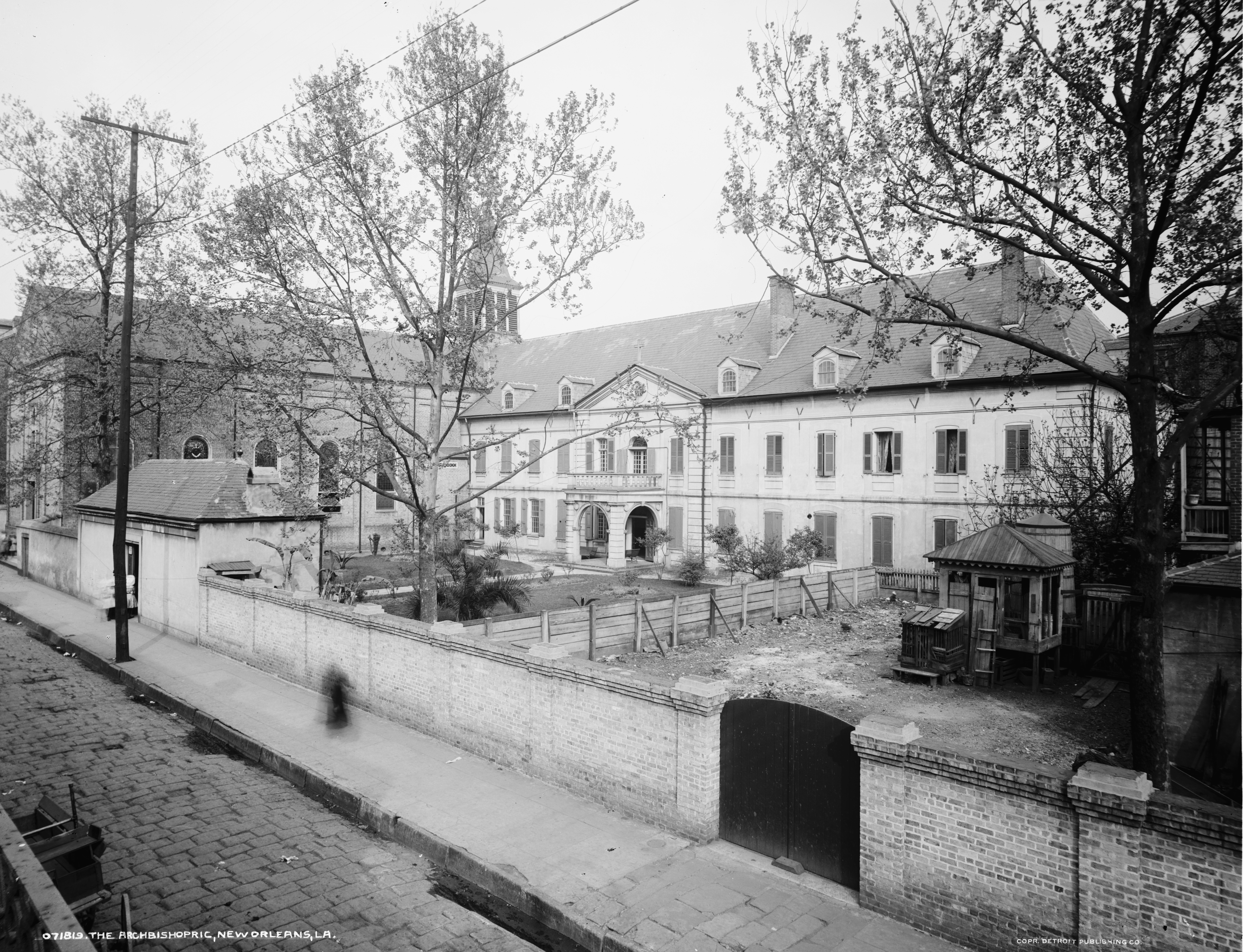
Bishop's residence and school, New Orleans

After completing his studies at St. Mary's Seminary, in Baltimore, Maryland, where he also studied English, he was ordained deacon. From there he proceeded to St. Louis, where he was ordained to the priesthood for the Diocese of Louisiana and the Two Floridas, by Dubourg, on May 16, 1818. Yellow fever outbreaks were not infrequent at the time, and he devoted himself to the sick and dying until he too fell ill. Upon his recovery, Dubourg called Portier to New Orleans, where he established a collegiate school in the former Ursuline convent in the French Quarter. During his time in New Orleans, Portier served as Vicar-General to Dubourg.

=== Vicar apostolic ===
Eight years later, on August 26, 1825, he was consecrated titular Bishop of Oleno by Bishop Joseph Rosati. He became the only Vicar Apostolic of the new Vicariate of Alabama and the Floridas, which included the Territory of Arkansas. At the time of his accession, Portier was the only clergyman in the vicariate and had practically three parishes with churches: Mobile, St. Augustine, and Pensacola. The first priest who came to his assistance was Edward T. Mayne, a student of Mt. St. Mary's College, Emmitsburg, Maryland, sent by Bishop England of Charleston, to take charge of the deserted church of St. Augustine.

His parishioners were Catholics who were descendants of colonial era peoples, including ethnic French, Spanish, German and African of former French and Spanish territories. Like several bishops of his era, Portier was a slaveowner. Portier began his administration by riding through his vicariate, offering the Eucharist, preaching, and administering the Sacraments as he went.

=== Bishop of Mobile ===
Portier sailed for Europe in 1829 to recruit assistants, and returned with a few seminarians and a priest, Mathias Loras. On May 15, 1829, the vicariate was raised by Pope Pius VIII to become the Diocese of Mobile, and Bishop Portier was made its first bishop. His cathedral was a small church twenty feet wide by fifty feet deep, his residence a still smaller two-roomed frame structure. A new cathedral was begun in 1837, and on December 8, 1850, Portier consecrated the Cathedral Basilica of the Immaculate Conception. Also in 1850, the eastern portion of Florida was detached from the Diocese of Mobile and annexed to the newly created Diocese of Savannah, based in Georgia.

In 1830, Portier established Spring Hill College, and named Mathias Loras its head. Loras served in that role until he was consecrated Bishop of Dubuque, Iowa, on December 10, 1837, by Portier. Portier also consecrated John Stephen Bazin, another president of Spring Hill, and later the third Bishop of Vincennes, Indiana on October 24, 1847.

In 1833 Portier secured from the Georgetown Visitation Monastery, Georgetown, Washington, D.C., a colony of nuns who established the Convent and Academy of the Visitation in Mobile. He brought the Brothers of the Sacred Heart from France about 1847, and the Daughters of Charity from Emmitsburg, Maryland, to manage orphan asylums for boys and girls, respectively. One of his last acts was founding a hospital at Mobile, presently known as Providence Hospital, administered by the Daughters of Charity.

=== Death ===
Portier died on May 14, 1859, aged 63. He is entombed in the crypt of the Cathedral Basilica of the Immaculate Conception in Mobile.

Catholic Church titles
Preceded by None	Bishop of Mobile; 1825–1859	Succeeded by John Quinlan
