= List of county roads in Bay County, Florida =

- County road shields used in Florida

Highway names
- Interstates: Interstate X (I-X)
- US Highways: U.S. Highway X (US X)
- State: State Road X (SR X)
- County: County Road X (CR-X)

System links
- County roads in Florida; County roads in Bay County

The following is a list of county roads in Bay County, Florida. All county roads are maintained by the county in which they reside, although not all routes are marked with standard county road shields.

== County roads in Bay County ==
Route number	Road Name(s)	From	To	Notes
CR 22	Sherman Avenue; E. 3rd Street	US 98 Bus. (5th Street) and Sherman Avenue in Panama City	US 98 Bus. / SR 22 (3rd Street) in Springfield	former SR 22
CR 28	11th Street	US 98 Bus. (Beck Avenue) and 11th Street in Panama City	US 98 (N. Tyndall Parkway) in Springfield	former SR 736
CR 30A	Michigan Avenue; W. 15th Street; Wilmont Avenue	SR 368 (23rd Street) and Michigan Avenue on the Panama City–Pretty Bayou line	US 98 (15th Street) in Panama City	former SR 30A
CR 30B	Joan Avenue; Front Beach Road; Moylan Road	CR 392 (Thomas Drive) on the Panama City Beach–Upper Grand Lagoon line	US 98 (Panama City Beach Parkway) in Upper Grand Lagoon	former SR 30B; Brief unsigned concurrency with US 98 Alt. / SR 30
CR 30C	Clara Avenue	US 98 Alt. / SR 30 (Front Beach Road) in Panama City Beach	US 98 (Panama City Beach Parkway) in Panama City Beach	former SR 30C
CR 30H	Lyndell Lane	US 98 Alt. / SR 30 in Panama City Beach	US 98 (Panama City Beach Parkway northeast of Panama City Beach	former SR 30H
CR 30P	Hills Road	US 98 Alt. / SR 30 (Front Beach Road) in Panama City Beach	US 98 (Panama City Beach Parkway) and Cambridge Boulevard in Panama City Beach	former SR 30F
CR 167		US 231 north-northeast of Fountain	CR 167 at the Bay–Calhoun county line north-northeast of Fountain	former SR 167; indicated on FDOT county map to be CR 2301, but signed as CR 167
CR 327	Lisenby Avenue; Airport Drive	US 98 (15th Street) in Panama City	SR 390 (St. Andrews Boulevard) / SR 391 (Airport Road) in Panama City	former SR 327
CR 368	23rd Avenue	SR 368 (23rd Avenue) / SR 390 (Beck Avenue) in Panama City	US 231 in Panama City	Signed as part of SR 368
CR 385	Frankford Avenue	US 98 Bus. (9th Street/Frankford Avenue) in Panama City	Florida A&M University Public Health Entomology Research & Education Center in Panama City	former SR 391
CR 386		US 98 southeast of Mexico Beach	CR 386 at the Bay–Gulf county line northeast of Mexico Beach	former SR 386
CR 386A	15th Street	US 98 in Mexico Beach	CR 386 east of Mexico Beach	former SR 386A
CR 388	Bennet Road	SR 77 / SR 388 and Edwards Road in Vicksburg	US 231 and Jadewood Circle in Youngstown	former SR 388 used to extend west to SR 79, but that became SR 388 ca. 2013
CR 389	E. 12th Street	US 231 / SR 389 (East Avenue) in Cedar Grove	SR 77 (Ohio Avenue) and 12th Street in Lynn Haven	former SR 389
CR 390	E. 14th Street	SR 77 (Ohio Avenue) / SR 390 (W. 14th Street) in Lynn Haven	US 231 in Cedar Grove	former SR 390
CR 390A				former SR 390A
CR 391				Extension of SR 391
CR 392	Thomas Drive	US 98 Alt. / SR 30 (Front Beach Road) / SR 392 (Hutchison Boulevard) in Panama City Beach	St. Andrews State Park in Lower Grand Lagoon	former SR 392
CR 396	Dellwood Beach Road	CR 747 (Magnolia Beach Road) in Upper Grand Lagoon	Dellwood Road in Upper Grand Lagoon	former SR 396
CR 396A	Jan Cooley Drive	Dead end east-northeast of Alligator Point in Upper Grand Lagoon	CR 396 (Dellwood Beach Road) in Upper Grand Lagoon	former SR 396A
CR 747	Magnolia Beach Road	CR 3031 (Thomas Drive) and Causeway Road in Upper Grand Lagoon	Annette Avenue / Magnolia Point Road in Upper Grand Lagoon	former SR 747
CR 2293	Titus Road; US 231; Star Avenue; John Pitts Road	CR 2321 in Cedar Grove	Jetton Road in Panama City	former SR 390; Brief unsigned concurrency with US 231 and CR 2315
CR 2296	Pine Log Road	Otter Creek Bridge Road north-northwest of West Bay	SR 79 in the Pine Log State Forest north-northwest of West Bay	
CR 2297		Davis Point Road / Allanton Road northwest of Allanton	SR 22 east-northeast of Callaway	former SR 167
CR 2300		Lansing Smith Electric Generating Plant southwest of Southport	SR 77 north of Southport	former SR 391
CR 2301		US 231 in Bayou George	CR 388 in Bennett	former SR 167; indicated on FDOT county map to be CR 2301, but signed as CR 167
CR 2301		US 231 north-northeast of Fountain	CR 167 at the Bay–Calhoun county line north-northeast of Fountain	former SR 167; indicated on FDOT county map to be CR 2301, but signed as CR 167
CR 2302	13th Street; Escambia Avenue	Deaurrecoechea Drive / Cavanaugh Lane south of Southport	SR 77 east of Southport	former SR 77A
CR 2302	Resota Beach Road	CR 2321 south-southwest of Resota Beach	Edwards Road / Resota Beach Road north-northwest of Resota Beach	
CR 2303	Indian Bluff Road; Cherokee Street; Bay Head Road	CR 2301 north of Cedar Grove	CR 2301 north of Cedar Grove	Signed backward: southern terminus is north of its northern terminus.
CR 2311	Highpoint Road	CR 2321 in Cedar Grove	Highpoint Road / High Point Lane	former SR 77C
CR 2312	Baldwin Road	SR 390 in Panama City	US 231 in Cedar Grove	former SR 744; portions between SR 390 and SR 77, and between CR 389 and US 231, are not displayed on FDOT county map.
CR 2314	Game Farm Road	SR 389 (East Avenue) and Game Farm Road on the Cedar Grove–Springfield line	CR 2327 (Transmitter Road) and Game Farm Road in Springfield	former SR 746
CR 2315	Plantation Drive; Old Bicycle Road; Star Avenue	Plantation Drive / Coleridge Road / Carriage Lane east of Callaway	US 231 / CR 2293 in Cedar Grove	former SR 719
CR 2316	Douglas Road	SR 389 (East Avenue) on the Cedar Grove–Springfield line	CR 2327 (Transmitter Road) in Springfield	
CR 2321		SR 77 east of Southport	US 231 in Cedar Grove	former SR 77A
CR 2322	E. 7th Street	CR 2329 (School Avenue) in Springfield	US 98 (Tyndall Parkway) and E. 7th Street in Callaway	
CR 2323	Boat Race Road; Berthe Avenue	US 98 Bus. in Parker	SR 22 north of Callaway	former SR 729
CR 2325	East Street; Bob Little Road; East 14th Street	Moss Drive / Moss Street / 4th Street in Parker	CR 2327 (Transmitter Road) in Springfield	former SR 22A
CR 2327	Transmitter Road	SR 22 (E. 3rd Street) and Transmitter Road in Springfield	CR 390 in Lynn Haven	former SR 735; portion north of US 231 not displayed on FDOT county map.
CR 2329	School Avenue	SR 22 (3rd Street) in Springfield	US 98 (E. 15th Street) on the Cedar Grove–Springfield line	former SR 743
CR 2337	Sherman Avenue	CR 28 (11th Street) on the Panama City–Cedar Grove line	SR 389 (East Avenue) on the Cedar Grove–Springfield line	former SR 389A; portion south of US 98 not displayed on FDOT county map.
CR 2341	Jenks Avenue	South of SR 368 (23rd Street) in Panama City	SR 390 and Northshore Road west of Lynn Haven	
CR 3026	Everitt Avenue; Cherry Street	US 98 Bus. on the Panama City–Springfield line	CR 2323 (Berthe Avenue) and Cherry Street in Callaway	
CR 3030	N. Lagoon Avenue; Daniel Street	CR 392 (Thomas Drive) in Panama City Beach	CR 3031 (Thomas Drive) in Upper Grand Lagoon	former SR 392A
CR 3031	Thomas Drive	CR 392 (Thomas Drive) and Bristol Street in Lower Grand Lagoon	US 98 and Wildwood Road in Upper Grand Lagoon	former SR 757
CR 3033	Richard Jackson Boulevard	US 98 Alt. / SR 30 (Front Beach Road) in Panama City Beach	US 98 (Panama City Beach Parkway) and Richard Jackson Boulevard in Panama City Beach	former SR 30D
CR 3035	Argonaut Road; Argonaut Street	US 98 Alt. / SR 30 (Front Beach Road) in Panama City Beach	US 98 (Panama City Beach Parkway) in Panama City Beach	former SR 30J
CR 3037	Wisteria Lane	US 98 Alt. / SR 30 (Front Beach Road) in Laguna Beach	US 98 (Panama City Beach Parkway) in Laguna Beach	former SR 30E
