= Florida State Road 389 =

State highway in Florida, United States

State Road 389
- SR 389 in red, CR 389 in blue

Route information
- Maintained by FDOT
- Length: 3.030 mi (4.876 km)

Major junctions
- South end: US 98 Bus. in Panama City
- US 98 in Cedar Grove
- North end: US 231 / CR 389 in Hiland Park

Location
- Country: United States
- State: Florida
- Counties: Bay

Highway system
- Florida State Highway System; Interstate; US; State; Former; Pre‑1945; Toll; Scenic
← SR 388	→ SR 390

State Road 389 (SR 389) is a north–south highway carried by East Avenue in Bay County, Florida. The southern terminus is at US 98 BUS (SR 30) in Panama City. The northern terminus is US 231 (SR 75) in Hiland Park where the road continues as County Road 389 (CR 389).

Before the late 1970s, the state-maintained portion actually continued south of its present terminus and dead-ended at the local paper mill. Today, that portion of East Avenue is maintained locally.

SR 389 is continuous with CR 389, which begins at US 231 (SR 75) and ends at SR 77 in Lynn Haven. This county-maintained stretch was signed as SR S-389 prior to the late 1970s.

== Major intersections ==
The entire route is in Bay County.

Location	mi	km	Destinations	Notes
Panama City	0.000	0.000	US 98 Bus. (5th Street / SR 30)	
Panama City–Cedar Grove line	0.744	1.197	CR 28 (11th Street)	
Cedar Grove	1.246	2.005	US 98 (East 15th Street / SR 30A)	
Hiland Park	2.483	3.996	CR 2337 south (Sherman Avenue)	
Hiland Park	2.891	4.653	East Game Farm Road (CR 2314 east)	
Hiland Park	3.030	4.876	US 231 (SR 75) / CR 389 north (East Avenue) – Panama City, Youngstown	
1.000 mi = 1.609 km; 1.000 km = 0.621 mi
