= Special routes of U.S. Route 98 =

Special routes of U.S. Route 98

Highway system
- United States Numbered Highway System; List; Special; Divided

There are six special routes along U.S. Route 98 and seven former routes. Most US 98 bannered routes are located in the U.S. state of Florida.

== Alabama ==
=== Alabama alternate route ===
U.S. Route 98 Alternate
- Location: Fairhope–Barnwell, Alabama

U.S. Route 98 Alternate (US 98 Alt.) is an alternate route of US 98. It travels from Fairhope, through Point Clear, to Barnwell along the former alignment of US 98. Although it is mostly signed as County Route 98, some US 98 Alt. signs remain.

Major junctions

The entire route is in Baldwin County.

Location	mi	km	Destinations	Notes
			US 98 – Mobile, Daphne	Western terminus
			US 98 – Fairhope, Pensacola	Eastern terminus
1.000 mi = 1.609 km; 1.000 km = 0.621 mi

=== Mobile truck route ===
U.S. Route 98 Truck
- Location: Mobile, Alabama

U.S. Route 98 Truck is the truck detour for US 98 around the Central Business District of Mobile, Alabama, allowing large trucks to bypass the narrow and low clearance Bankhead Tunnel. It also serves as a route for vehicles carrying hazardous cargo that are prohibited from using the larger George Wallace Tunnel on Interstate 10. The route exists in concurrency with US 90, as well as a portion of I-165.

The route begins on North Broad Street at the north end of the wrong way concurrency between US 90 and 98. Overlapping US 90 and AL 13/Alt. 16, North Broad Street carries all four routes northwest until passing the intersection of Congress Street, then makes a sharp curve to the northeast passing S D Bishop State Junior College and Bishop State Community College. North of Dr. Martin Luther King Jr. Avenue (formerly Glidden Place), the routes make an east-northeasterly turn onto Beauregard Street. At the intersection with North Water Street, all routes make a left turn at the southern terminus of I-165. The routes leave I-165 at Exit 2 (New Bay Bridge Road), though westbound signs indicate another leg of US Truck Route 98 continuing north of the interchange.

New Bay Bridge Road passes through historic Africatown, where it has an interchange with the southern terminus of US 43, which is also where AL 13 leaves, then drops the "new" from the street name, encroaching on more industrial surroundings as it encounters interchanges with Paper Mill Road and Clint Street before crossing the Cochrane–Africatown USA Bridge onto Blakely Island where the routes curve straight south onto the Old Spanish Trail. U.S. Truck Route 98 ends at the eastern portal of the Bankhead Tunnel just north of Exit 27 on I-10, where US 90 and 98 continue onto another concurrency, this time in the same direction over Battleship Parkway.

Major junctions

The entire route is in Mobile County.

Location	mi	km	Destinations	Notes
Mobile			US 98	Western terminus
Mobile			US 90 west	West end of US 90 concurrency
Mobile			I-165 begins	West end of I-165 concurrency
Mobile			To Conception Street Road	Eastbound exit and westbound entrance
Mobile			I-165 north to I-65	East end of I-165 concurrency
			I-10 / US 90 east / US 98 – Mobile, Pensacola	Eastern terminus; east end of US 90 concurrency
1.000 mi = 1.609 km; 1.000 km = 0.621 mi: Concurrency terminus; Incomplete access

== Florida ==
=== Pensacola business loop ===
U.S. Highway 98 Business
- Location: Pensacola, Florida
- Length: 2.290 mi (3.685 km)

U.S. Highway 98 Business is an east–west business route located mostly in downtown Pensacola, Florida. It is also known as Garden Street, Alcaniz Street, W.D. Childers Plaza and Gregory Street.

Major junctions

The entire route is in Pensacola, Escambia County.

mi	km	Destinations	Notes
0.000	0.000	US 98 / SR 292 (South Pace Boulevard / Navy Boulevard)	
1.979	3.185	North Alcaniz Street (SR 291 north)	
2.0	3.2	I-110 north (SR 8A) to I-10 – Airport	I-110 exit 1; access from US 98 Bus. east is via Tarragona Street
2.290	3.685	US 98 (North 9th Avenue / SR 289 north / East Chase Street) to I-110 north – Beaches, Port of Pensacola, Gregory Street east	
1.000 mi = 1.609 km; 1.000 km = 0.621 mi

=== Panama City business route ===
U.S. Highway 98 Business
- Location: Panama City, Florida
- Length: 9.102 mi (14.648 km)

U.S. Highway 98 Business was the original segment of US 98 in Panama City, Florida until U.S. Bypass Route 98 was decommissioned in 1979. It currently serves as a business route along the coast of Panama City between St. Andrews and Parker. Streets consist of Beck Avenue, West 10th Street, Chestnut Avenue, West 9th Street, Frankford Avenue, Beach Drive, 6th Street, East 5th Street, Boat Race Road, and Pitts Bayou.

Major intersections

The entire route is in Bay County.

Location	mi	km	Destinations	Notes
Panama City	0.000	0.000	US 98 (SR 30 west / SR 30A east) / SR 390 east (Beck Avenue) to US 231 – Panama City Beach, Cedar Grove	
Panama City	0.665	1.070	CR 28 east (11th Street)	
Panama City	1.330	2.140	CR 385 north (Frankford Avenue)	
Panama City	3.400	5.472	US 231 north (Harrison Avenue / SR 75) – Youngstown, St. John, IN	
Panama City	4.019	6.468	SR 77 north (MLK Jr. Boulevard)	
Panama City	5.566	8.958	SR 389 north (East Avenue) – Cedar Grove	
Springfield	6.130	9.865	SR 22 east (Third Street) – Callaway, Wewahitchka	
Parker	8.490	13.663	South Highway 22A	former SR 22A
Parker	8.635	13.897	To US 98 west (SR 30A) / Boatrace Road	
Parker	9.102	14.648	US 98 east (SR 30) – Mexico Beach	no left turn eastbound
1.000 mi = 1.609 km; 1.000 km = 0.621 mi

=== Brooksville truck route ===
U.S. Highway 98 Truck
- Location: Brooksville, Florida

U.S. Route 98 Truck is the truck detour for US 98 around Brooksville, Florida. Although a significant portion of the truck route exists within the city limits, it still avoids historic downtown Brooksville by moving to the south and the west. The route exists in concurrency with two existing State Roads and one County Road, and never independently.

Beginning at Jasmine Avenue, and East Jefferson Road (State Road 50A), Truck US 98 runs in concurrency with State Road 50 in a southwesterly direction. As it approaches County Road 581 it turns from southwest to direct west. Crossing the railroad tracks near County Road 445, the road passes by a large church before curving slightly to the northwest. This segment also contains the secret designation of State Road 700, until it reaches the intersection of U.S. Route 41. Here, State Road 700 leaves the truck route, and heads north along US 41 (SR 45) until branching off to Ponce De Leon Boulevard to rejoin US 98. Meanwhile, SR 50/Truck US 98 passes a branch of the Brooksville Post Office, and makes a northbound curve at Horse Lake Drive, then at the Hernando County Sheriff's Office before meeting West Jefferson Road. This entire section of SR 50/US Truck 98 was widened from two lanes to four lanes in the early-21st Century.

While SR 50 takes its sharp left turn toward Weeki Wachee, and SR 50A begins eastbound into downtown Brooksville, Truck Route US 98 continues north along County Road 485, also known as Cobb Road. From that intersection it narrows down to two lanes, as it approaches a four-way stop intersection and accompanying red blinker-lights with County Road 484 (West Ford Dade Avenue).

Two old sections of Cobb Road used to exist. One is to the right north of County Road 484 (West Fort Dade Avenue), and the other is a mining road that runs from the intersection with Yontz Road to an isolated section of County Road 476 (Lake Lindsey Road) in Stafford.

Crossing the railroad tracks a second time after the intersection with Yontz Road (Former County Road 485B), the road winds through a rural field between a mining area and a hilly region before finally reuniting with US 98 south of the Willow Prairie Lake area. Truck Weigh Stations exist just west of the northern terminus of Truck US 98 on the right of way of a former railroad crossing.

== Former ==
=== Natchez business route ===
U.S. Highway 98 Business
- Location: Natchez, Mississippi
- Existed: 1960s–1970s

Business U.S. Route 98 was a short business route of U.S. Route 98 in Natchez, Mississippi between the early 1960s and 1970s. It also included concurrencies with US 61, Bus US 61, Jefferson Street, Canal Street.

=== Spanish Fort truck route ===
U.S. Route 98 Truck
- Location: Spanish Fort, Alabama
- Existed: ????–2000s

=== Pensacola toll route ===
U.S. Highway 98 Toll
- Location: Pensacola-Navarre in Florida
- Existed: 1939–1946

=== Panama City Beach bypass route ===
U.S. Highway 98 Bypass
- Location: Panama City Beach, Florida
- Existed: 1973–1979

Bypass U.S. Route 98 was a bypass of the concurrency of U.S. Routes 98 between Hollywood Beach, Florida and Panama City Beach, Florida, that was replaced by mainline US 98. The road was also unsigned State Road 30A, which still exists.

=== Panama City alternate route ===
U.S. Highway 98 Alternate
- Location: Panama City Beach, Florida
- Existed: 1979–2012

U.S. Highway 98 Alternate was the original segment of US 98 in Panama City Beach, Florida until U.S. Bypass Route 98 was decommissioned in 1979. The road is signed as State Road 30 and begins at the Carillion Beach Resorts as Front Beach Road. It turns from south to east where it runs directly along the shores of the Gulf of Mexico. It also includes a pair of wye intersections with both legs of the southern terminus of State Road 79. The road doesn't begin to move away from the beach until east of Dement Circle, when it turns northeast, and then intersects with South Thomas Drive, and then the western terminus of County Road 392 and eastern terminus of CR 392A. US ALT 98 finally ends at US 98 at an interchange just west of the north end of CR 392.

=== Dade City truck route ===
U.S. Highway 98 Truck
- Location: Dade City, Florida
- Existed: 1980s–2007

Truck U.S. Route 98-301 was a truck bypass of the concurrency of U.S. Routes 98 & 301 in Dade City, Florida. The road was also unsigned State Road 533, which still exists.

Truck US 98-301 ran to the east of the original US 98-301, which previously ran through the heart of Dade City along 7th Street. After the intersection with Alternate County Road 35 it ran parallel to a CSX railroad line, and passes by the old Dade City Atlantic Coast Line Railroad Depot.

In February 2007, this section was converted into the main branch of the US 98-301 concurrency. It maintains the unsigned SR 533 designation, while SR 35 and SR 700 remain on the 7th Street (Old US 98/301), barring a relinquished portion in downtown Dade City.

Major junctions

The entire route is in Dade City, Pasco County.

mi	km	Destinations	Notes
		US 98 / US 301 / SR 35 / SR 39 (7th Street)	Former US Bus 98-301, Now SR 39
		CR 35A (Old Lakeland Highway)	
		SR 52 west (Meridian Avenue)	
		US 98 / US 301 / SR 35 / SR 39 (7th Street)	Former US Bus 98-301, Now SR 39
1.000 mi = 1.609 km; 1.000 km = 0.621 mi

Browse numbered routes
← SR 530	SR 533	→ SR 534

=== Dade City business route ===
U.S. Highway 98 Business
- Location: Dade City, Florida
- Existed: 1980s–2007

Business U.S. Route 98-301 was the main line of the concurrency of U.S. Routes 98 & 301 in Dade City, Florida until February 2007. The road was also unsigned State Road 35, State Road 39, and State Road 700. During the decommissioning of US 98-301 Truck Route, FDOT was carrying out a resurfacing project of the road, and exposed the road's status as State Road 39. SRs 35 and 700 remain hidden, however.

=== Lakeland business route ===
U.S. Highway 98 Business
- Location: Lakeland, Florida
- Existed: 1960s–1999

Business U.S. Route 98 was a short business route of U.S. Routes 98 in Lakeland, Florida between the early 1960s and 1999. It also included a concurrency with former US Bus 92 along Main Street.

=== Bartow business route ===
U.S. Highway 98 Business
- Location: Bartow, Florida

Business U.S. Route 98 was a short business route of U.S. Route 98 in Bartow, Florida between the early 1960s and 1999. The route ran along parts of Broadway and Main Street in Downtown Bartow.

== See also ==
- List of special routes of the United States Numbered Highway System
