= Florida State Road 390 =

State highway in Florida, United States

State Road 390

Route information
- Maintained by FDOT
- Length: 10.164 mi (16.357 km)

Major junctions
- West end: US 98 / US 98 Bus. in Panama City
- East end: US 231 in Panama City

Location
- Country: United States
- State: Florida
- Counties: Bay

Highway system
- Florida State Highway System; Interstate; US; State; Former; Pre‑1945; Toll; Scenic
← SR 389	→ SR 391

State Road 390 (SR 390) is a two-lane state highway in Bay County, Florida. The route is signed as east-west but runs more north-south for much of its run. The western (southern) terminus is at the intersection of U.S. Route 98 (US 98)/SR 30 and US 98 BUS/SR 30A in St. Andrews (part of Panama City). The highway is carried by Beck Ave from this point until shortly after it crosses SR 368 (23rd St), at which point it becomes St Andrews Blvd. The route winds northeasterly into Lynn Haven, where it is carried by Tennessee Ave at one point. In Lynn Haven, the road eventually turns due east and intersects with SR 77 (Ohio Ave), and continues east until its terminus at US 231/SR 75. The portion between SR 77 and US 231 was signed as SR S-390 before being given to the county in the late 1970s, and back to the state in 2016.

Further north on US 231/SR 75, John Pitts Road branches off to the east, and before the early 1980s, this road was signed as a segment of SR S-390. This road is now signed as CR 2293 and eventually dead ends east of US 231/SR 75.

== Major intersections ==
The entire route is in Bay County.

Location	mi	km	Destinations	Notes
Panama City	0.000	0.000	US 98 (SR 30 west / SR 30A east) / US 98 Bus. east (Beck Avenue / SR 30 east) – Cedar Grove, Panama City Beach	
Panama City	0.824	1.326	SR 368 (23rd Street) – Gulf Coast State College, Florida State University Panama City	
Pretty Bayou	1.468	2.363	CR 385 (Frankford Avenue) – Florida A&M University Mulrennan Public Health Entomology Center	
Pretty Bayou	1.746	2.810	SR 391 south (Airport Road)	
Pretty Bayou	2.042	3.286	SR 327 south (Lisenby Avenue) – National Guard Armory	
Panama City	2.826	4.548	CR 2312 east (Baldwin Road)	
Lynn Haven	5.856	9.424	SR 77 (Ohio Avenue) – Southport	
Lynn Haven	7.197	11.582	CR 389	
Lynn Haven	8.454	13.605	CR 2327 south (Transmitter Road)	
Panama City	10.164	16.357	US 231 (SR 75)	
1.000 mi = 1.609 km; 1.000 km = 0.621 mi
