= Florida State Road 22 =

Highway in Florida, US

State Road 22

Route information
- Maintained by FDOT
- Length: 25.855 mi (41.610 km)
- Existed: 1945–present

Major junctions
- West end: US 98 Bus. in Springfield
- US 98 in Callaway
- East end: SR 71 in Wewahitchka

Location
- Country: United States
- State: Florida
- Counties: Bay, Gulf

Highway system
- Florida State Highway System; Interstate; US; State; Former; Pre‑1945; Toll; Scenic
← SR 21	→ US 23

State Road 22 (SR 22) runs east and west from US 98 Business in Springfield to SR 71 in Wewahitchka. SR 22 is known as East 3rd Street in Springfield and Wewa Highway from Callaway to Wewahitchka. With the exception of the intersection with US 98 in Callaway, SR 22 is entirely a two-lane undivided highway, and is far more rural east of Callaway.

Beginning one block south of SR 22's eastern terminus, County Road 22 (CR 22) extends the route to the banks of the Apalachicola River. Several other disconnected segments of CR 22 exist in the Apalachicola National Forest and to the east in Liberty and Wakulla Counties, evidencing a former plan to extend SR 22 to Sopchoppy via Sumatra.

== Major intersections ==
County	Location	mi	km	Destinations	Notes
Bay	Springfield	0.000	0.000	US 98 Bus. (SR 30)	
Bay	Springfield	0.561	0.903	CR 2327 north (Transmitter Road)	
Bay	Callaway	1.057	1.701	Bob Little Road	former SR 22A
Bay	Callaway	1.560	2.511	US 98 (Tyndall Parkway / SR 30A) – Tyndall AFB, Panama City	
Bay		2.571	4.138	CR 2323 south (Berthe Avenue)	
Bay	Callaway	3.069	4.939	CR 2315 (Star Avenue)	
Bay		7.116	11.452	CR 2297 south – Eastern Shipbuilding Group	
Gulf		23.370	37.610	CR 22A east	
Gulf	Wewahitchka	25.568	41.148	CR 22A west (Old Panama Highway)	
Gulf	Wewahitchka	25.855	41.610	SR 71	
1.000 mi = 1.609 km; 1.000 km = 0.621 mi
