= Sunnyside, Florida =

Coordinates: 30.25048°N 85.947714°W

- Unincorporated Community
- Interactive map of Sunnyside, Florida
- Country: United States
- State: Florida
- County: Bay

Government
  - Commissioner: Phillip Griffits (R)
- Time zone: UTC-6 (Central (CST))
  - Summer (DST): UTC-5 (CDT)
- ZIP code: 32413
- Area code: 850

Sunnyside is an unincorporated community in Bay County, Florida, United States. It is part of the Panama City–Lynn Haven–Panama City Beach Metropolitan Statistical Area.

Sunnyside is located along State Road 30 (former US 98 Alternate) west of Laguna Beach and Santa Monica, and east of Riviera Beach.
