= U.S. Route 231 in Florida =

Highway in Florida

U.S. Highway 231

Route information
- Maintained by FDOT
- Length: 66.591 mi (107.168 km)
- Existed: 1926–present

Major junctions
- South end: 6th Street in Panama City
- US 98 in Panama City; SR 20 near Fountain; I-10 / SR 8 / US 90 in Cottondale
- North end: US 231 / SR 1 near Campbellton

Location
- Country: United States
- State: Florida
- Counties: Bay, Jackson

Highway system
- United States Numbered Highway System; List; Special; Divided; Florida State Highway System; Interstate; US; State; Former; Pre‑1945; Toll; Scenic
← SR 230	→ SR 231
← I-75	SR 75	→ SR 76

U.S. Route 231 (US 231) in Florida is a north–south United States Highway. It runs 52 miles (84 km) from Panama City north to the Alabama State Line in Bay and Jackson Counties. The entire route is also unsigned State Road 75 (SR 75), and is a four-lane highway throughout the state whether the road is divided or not.

== Route description ==
=== Panama City and Bay County ===
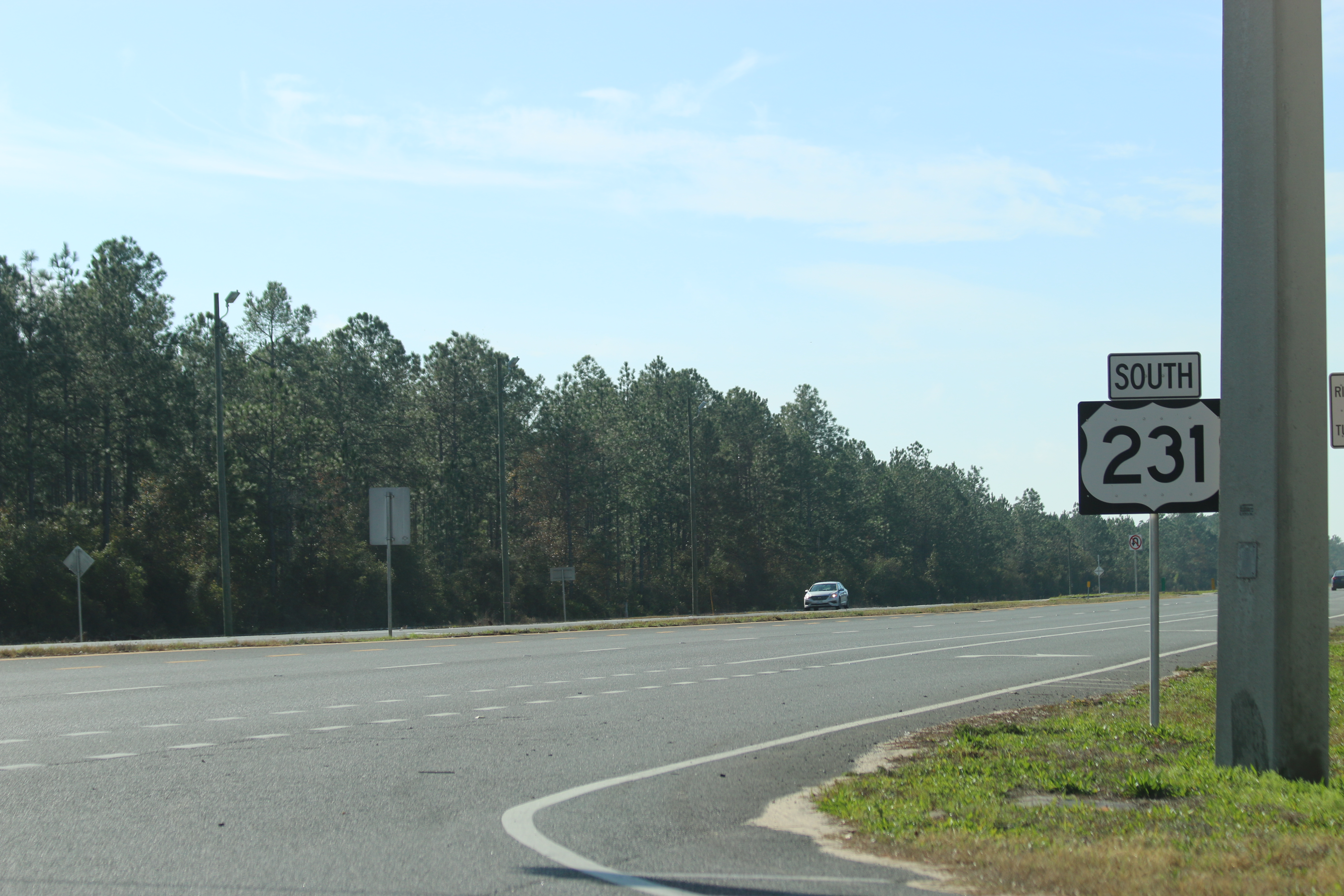
Looking south at US 231 north of Panama City

U.S. Route 231 begins its northward journey in Panama City at US Business Route 98 (Sixth Street) as a continuation of Harrison Avenue, which spans as far south as the Panama City Marina. Harrison Avenue runs straight north and south as far south as Fourth Street and serves as the point in the city where intersecting west-to-east streets change their names from "West ?th Street," to "East ?th Street." After crossing U.S. Route 98 (15th Street), US 231 intersects an at-grade railroad crossing with the Atlanta and Saint Andrews Bay Railway and moves onto a four-lane momentarily divided highway that runs parallel to that very crossing, while Harrison Avenue becomes State Road 391. For the rest of its journey through the state, US 231 runs as a four-lane divided highway, except in specific towns and cities. After US 231 leaves Harrison Avenue, the tracks that run alongside the northbound lane are hidden by small trees. Sparse development exists on the opposite side which increases as the road moves north. One other intersection (East 19th Street) can be spotted between some shopping centers, and the first major intersection since Harrison Avenue which is State Road 77 (North Cove Boulevard), the northeast corner of which is occupied by the Panama City Mall. After this it intersects Edwards Drive, which while only a local road leading to an industrial area across the tracks, also has an intersection with Industrial Drive which is the address of the headquarters of Bay Line Railroad the company that inherited the A&SAB railroad line running along US 231. North of there and some more local intersections it has an at-grade interchange with State Road 368 (East 23rd Street). Continuing at the same trajectory and intersecting another group of local streets, it briefly enters Hiland Park where it intersects SR/CR 389 and just north of this, the eastern terminus of County Road 2312 (East Baldwin Road). It is only after this point that the road becomes a divided highway, but remains along the same trajectory, and runs along that same railroad line even as it enters a formerly incorporated town known as Cedar Grove, where it becomes slightly less urban and eventually serves as the eastern terminus of State Road 390, and shortly after this, the southern terminus of County Road 2321 (formerly SR 77A). Still along the same trajectory, it has a short concurrency with County Road 2293 between Titus Road and John Pitts Road, the latter of the two which also contains County Road 2315 (former State Road 719).

The road and the tracks cross bridges over Bayou George and enter the community named after the waterway. The closest road resembling a major intersection there is County Road 2301 (formerly State Road 167). Later Route 231 dips below the level of the railroad tracks around Wendy Street, but returns to the same level. Later it passes by an unfinished industrial park which includes such sites as the Coastal Helicopters Incorporated Heliport. Bay County Correctional Facility can also be found near here. Further northeast the area becomes more rural, surrounded by much more forestland interrupted at first by a power line right-of-way and later by scattered local businesses dot the road further northeast. Around Nixon the road begins to curve more to the north, and the A&SAB railroad tracks still remain parallel to the northbound lane. Most of the road at this point is surrounded by forests, farms, farm-related businesses, and small dirt roads. Though the intersection with Scotts Ferry Road is touted as a major intersection on Google Maps, in reality it is only another dirt road. US 231 remains a four-lane divided highway until it reaches Youngstown, and becomes a four-lane undivided highway with a continuous center-left-turn lane. The few intersections within this segment are local streets, one of which leads to a local FDOT facility. The closest thing resembling a major intersection within Youngstown is the eastern terminus of County Road 388, the vicinity of which is a school zone for a school along CR 388. The divider begins again at a dirt road named Pamela Lane that momentarily runs parallel to US 231 before making a right turn in front of a local lumber store. Surprisingly relevant to this, the rest of the journey is almost entirely timber country until a small truck stop and fast food restaurant can be spotted along the southbound lane in Fountain where the road intersects State Road 20. North of there, the A&SAB railroad line branches away from US 231 to the northeast, but is encountered again as it makes a reverse curve over a pair of bridges over the tracks. This track runs parallel to a former segment of the road and returns to ground level at the Pine Lake RV Park. The former segment ends just south of the intersection with County Road 167 (formerly State Road 167) in Betts. CR 167 provides one last chance to enter neighboring Calhoun County. All other intersections at this point are local streets and dirt roads. The road moves northeast as it inches closer to the Bay-Calhoun County Line, but instead crosses the Bay-Jackson County Line just north of a power line right-of-way.

=== Jackson County ===
Whereas US 231 runs along the northeastern edge of Bay-Calhoun County Line as it left Bay County, it runs along the western edge of the Washington-Jackson County Line county as it enters Jackson County. What would appear to be a former segment of the road can be found between Freeman Road and Lakepoint Road, as it curves far away from Compass Lake, only to run along the east side of the same A&SAB railroad line it ran along the west side of in most of Bay County. The north end of Lakepoint Road can be found at the shared intersection with Pikes Pond Road. North of there, the road moves away from the tracks again near a side road and former segment called "Blossom Loop" on the southbound side and enters Round Lake where the divider ends again. Blossom Loop ends at US 231 just south of the intersection with Felix Street, but another former segment named "Dryer Street" begins on the northbound side just north of the same intersection, although this former segment is shorter than the latter. Between Reddy Creek Road and Shores Road, the lake the community is named for is found on the east side of the road and the tracks move back to the west side of the road. The divider is revived again north of Estelle Street as the road leaves Round Lake. The surroundings in this segment are a repeat of the one south of Round Lake, but the divided section is short-lived however as it eventually approaches a bridge over Stump Creek entering Alford where the divider ends and the road becomes Georgia Street. Compared to the other communities north of Panama City, Alford is more developed and has more paved intersections, among them County Road 1656 (formerly State Road 276A). Three blocks later, the first of which includes the Alford Post Office, the concurrency with County Road 276 begins at the Park Avenue/Park Road intersection. The divider begins again at Little Valley Road. After curving away from the tracks across from Rowell Road, US 231 enters the community of Steele City, and CR 276 turns east onto Kynesville Road which becomes State Road 276 near Marianna. North of this is the eastern terminus of the western segment of County Road 280 (Corbin Road), which leads into Washington County.

A surprisingly unusual full traffic signal can be found at the intersection of Green Circle Parkway, formerly Farren Ranch Road, a local street converted to the entrance to the Green Circle Bio-Energy Plant. The tracks return to the west side of the road just south of Dilmore Road, and the northeast corner is the site of two major gas stations and truck stops meant for travelers as it approaches the half-cloverleaf interchange with Interstate 10 (I-10) at exit 130. The A&SAB railroad line, the reason for the half-cloverleaf interchange, branches away again on its northernmost side. The road officially enters Cottondale just south of the intersection of Obert Road, the northwest corner of which also contains a dirt driveway to Cottondale Airport. Further north into Downtown Cottondale, the speed limit is reduced and the divider ends once again as the road becomes Main Street, although it remains four-lanes wide just south of the intersection of U.S. Route 90. North of US 90, the road runs briefly through a school zone and four blocks later intersects an at-grade crossing with the CSX P&A Subdivision, which is just east of a junction with the A&SAB railroad line. A block north at Front Street, the Cottondale Post Office is on the northwest corner. Roughly around Milton Street, the area becomes surprisingly residential with random local businesses such as farm stands churches. Just after Dogwood Drive, plastic pylons run along the double-solid line along the left-turn lane for County Road 169 then US 231 becomes a divided highway north of the city limits and curves to the northeast again.

After an intersection with the entrance to a trailer park along the southbound lane, the road encounters two intersections with County Road 164 (Lovewood Road), the first of which is paved, and the next which is a dirt road, but nevertheless becomes a multiplex with numerous major highways in Marianna and points east. As the road descends slightly it crosses a power line right-of-way, the east side of which contains the end of an intersection that's not so important until you consider the fact that it has a connection with the next road. The right-of-way to an abandoned segment of US 231/SR 75 branches off to the northeast just south of the intersection with the northern terminus of State Road 73, then the road curves to the left and is reunited with the former right-of-way of US 231/SR 73 behind a ramshackle church made out of trailers and sheds. Farmland becomes more prevalent at this point than forest land. The farmland is briefly suspended just north of the intersection of Springfield Road, but begins to return to the area on the southeast corner of the intersection with County Road 162 (Main Street/Jacob Road), and opens up once again, although occasionally this farmland is interrupted by small random parcels of woodland. Between Misty Trail and New Bethel Road, Route 231 curves to the west where the divided highway ends just before another bridge over the A&SAB railroad line as it enters Campbellton. Returning to ground level, the road then curves north as it approaches State Road 273. and a former section of State Road 2, both of which have local extensions cut off on the opposite sides of the intersections that were cut off at Route 231 and converted into dead end streets. Merely yards later in front of a large farm and feed warehouse, the road intersects State Road 2, the northwest corner of which contains the local post office.

North of Campbellton, the road divides again for one last time north of Dothan Street as it curves around the west bank of Brantley Pond then returns to the same alignment after the intersection of Rambo Road. Though a Florida Welcome Center exists on the southbound lane which can also be accessed from the northbound lane, two last intersections exist in Florida; Dionne Road, a narrow dirt road that can only be accessed from the northbound lane, and A.M.E. Road, a paved intersection that runs west from same lane along the Florida-Alabama border. US 231 crosses the Alabama State Line a mere 144 feet north of that intersection, which is also the northern terminus of State Road 75 and southern terminus of Alabama State Route 1.

== Major intersections ==
County	Location	mi	km	Destinations	Notes
Bay	Panama City	0.000	0.000	6th Street and Harrison Avenue	Southern terminus of US 231
Bay	Panama City	0.620	0.998	CR 28 (11th Street)	
Bay	Panama City	1.124	1.809	US 98 (15th Street / SR 30A) – Beaches	
Bay	Panama City	1.164	1.873	SR 391 north (Harrison Avenue) – Junior Museum of Bay County	
Bay	Panama City	1.938	3.119	SR 77 (Martin Luther King Jr. Boulevard) – Lynn Haven, Chipley, BMC Gooding Institute	
Bay	Panama City	2.644	4.255	SR 368 west (23rd Street)	
Bay	Hiland Park	3.886	6.254	SR 389 south / CR 389 north (East Avenue) – Lynn Haven, Cedar Grove	
Bay	Hiland Park	4.043	6.507	CR 2312 west (Baldwin Road)	
Bay		5.225	8.409	CR 2327 (Transmitter Road) – Tyndall AFB, Mexico Beach	
Bay	College Station	7.434	11.964	SR 390 west – Lynn Haven	
Bay	College Station	7.529	12.117	CR 2321 north – Deer Point Dam	
Bay		9.038	14.545	CR 2293 west (Titus Road)	
Bay		9.115	14.669	CR 2293 east / CR 2315 south (Star Avenue)	
Bay	Bayou George	10.426	16.779	CR 2301 north	
Bay	Youngstown	20.415	32.855	CR 388 west	
Bay		25.223	40.592	SR 20 – Ebro, Clarksville, Panama City Beach, Beaches, Dog Track	
Bay	Betts	32.503	52.309	CR 167 north – Panama Beach Raceway, Florida Caverns State Park	
Jackson		35.630	57.341	Lake Point Road - Compass Lake	former US 231 / SR 75
Jackson		39.463	63.510	Lake Point Road - Compass Lake	former US 231 / SR 75
Jackson	Alford	43.878	70.615	CR 1656 east (Third Avenue)	
Jackson	Alford	44.086	70.950	CR 276 west (Park Avenue)	south end of CR 276 overlap
Jackson	Steele City	46.018	74.059	CR 276 east (Kynesville Road) – Marianna, Florida Caverns State Park	north end of CR 276 overlap
Jackson	Steele City	46.138	74.252	CR 280 west (Corbin Road)	
Jackson		48.013	77.269	I-10 (SR 8) – Pensacola, Tallahassee	Exit 130 (I-10)
Jackson	Cottondale	50.822	81.790	US 90 (Levy Street / SR 10) – Chipley, Marianna, Florida Caverns State Park, Falling Waters State Recreation Area	
Jackson	Cottondale	51.871	83.478	CR 169 north (Peanut Road) – Graceville	
Jackson		54.824	88.231	SR 73 south – Marianna, Florida Caverns State Park	
Jackson		58.259	93.759	CR 162 – Jacob City, Greenwood, NFREC-Marianna Beef Unit and Bull Test	
Jackson	Campbellton	63.104	101.556	SR 273 south – Chipley	
Jackson	Campbellton	63.191	101.696	SR 2 – Graceville, Malone	
Jackson	State Line	66.591	107.168	US 231 north (SR 1) – Dothan	Alabama state line
1.000 mi = 1.609 km; 1.000 km = 0.621 mi: Concurrency terminus

== History ==
A US 231 shield used in Florida prior to 1993

US 231 was established in Florida in 1926, but the original southern terminus was in Marianna where the west end of the US 90/SR 73 concurrency is today. This would change in 1954 when it was rerouted to Panama City.

Beginning in 1956, signs for U.S. Highways in Florida had different colors for each highway. The shield for US 231 was yellow with black lettering and a white outline, until the state was forced by the federal government to conform to standards that required consistent black-and-white signs in 1993.

In the 1990s and early 21st century, residents of Dothan, Alabama across the state line sought to transform US 231 into a spur of an interstate highway. This same proposal also included the upgrading of US 231 in Florida. The proposal was never implemented.

U.S. Route 231
Previous state: Terminus	Florida	Next state: Alabama
