= Florida State Road 30 =

Highway in Florida, US

State Road 30

Route information
- Maintained by FDOT
- Length: 283.214 mi (455.789 km)
- Existed: 1945–present

Major junctions
- West end: US 98 towards Mobile, AL
- SR 392A in Panama City Beach
- East end: US 19 / US 27 Alt. / US 98 / US 221 in Perry

Location
- Country: United States
- State: Florida
- Counties: Escambia, Santa Rosa, Okaloosa, Walton, Bay, Gulf, Franklin, Wakulla, Jefferson, Taylor

Highway system
- Florida State Highway System; Interstate; US; State; Former; Pre‑1945; Toll; Scenic
← SR 29	→ SR 30A

State Road 30 (SR 30) is the mostly hidden Florida Department of Transportation designation for most of US 98 from the Florida-Alabama state line to east of Perry, Florida.

In a 14-mile-long stretch west of Panama City, US 98 and SR 30 are separated by less than one mile (1.6 km), with SR 30 on Front Beach Road along the shore of the Gulf of Mexico in Hollywood Beach, Laguna Beach, and Panama City Beach, and US 98 inland (as unsigned State Road 30A) along Panama City Beach Parkway bypassing the beach communities. In 2009, the Florida DOT began signing Front Beach Road as SR 30, and removed US 98 Alt signs.

In Panama City, and Callaway, US 98 and SR 30 take different courses as they pass through the two cities, in which SR 30 becomes Business US 98 and US 98 becomes unsigned SR 30A (for more details on the routing through Panama City and Callaway, click here). Both at the western and eastern end of the split, US 98 and SR 30 merge upon approach of a bridge (on Panama City Parkway crossing Saint Andrew Bay to the west; and, to the east, New Dupont Bridge crossing East Bay for access to – and through – Tyndall Air Force Base).

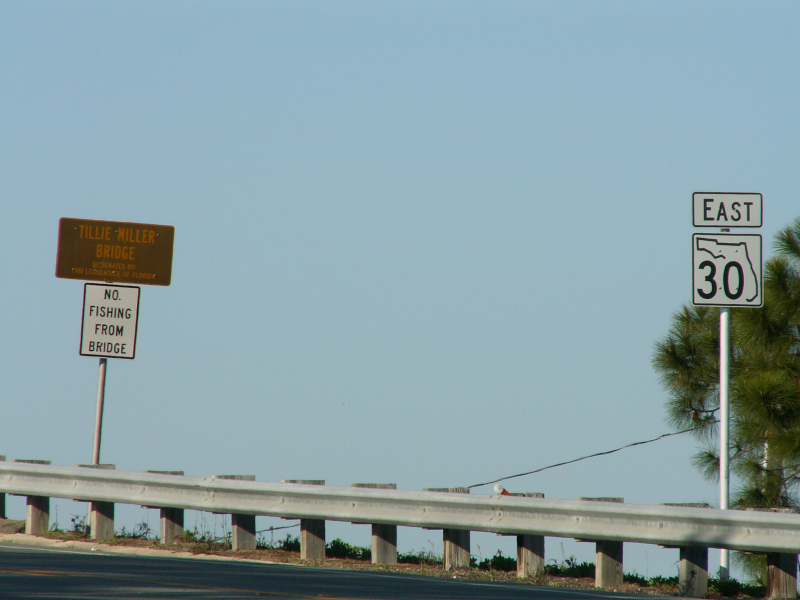
SR 30 signage at the CR 379 intersection in Carabelle

The eastern terminus of SR 30 is an intersection with US 19-US 27-SR 20 in Perry. There, a motorist driving eastbound on US 98 (West Hampton Springs Avenue) can turn southward onto its continuation on Byron Butler Parkway (Alternate US 27-US 19-US 98). Motorists continuing eastward on East Hampton Springs Avenue travel along southbound US 27-SR 20 toward Mayo, Alachua, and Gainesville.

== History ==
FDOT announced in January 2010, near the end of the Pensacola Bay Bridge's 50-year design life, that the bridge was structurally deficient and would have to be replaced within six years. As of 2011, a study is underway to determine the "feasibility, location, and conceptual design" of a replacement bridge. As of February 2013, plans have begun to replace the bridge with construction beginning within two years, at a cost of $595.6 million, on a course slightly to the west of the existing bridge. The new bridge, like the current one, will not charge a toll. As of February 2020, construction of the new bridge is complete with only the pedestrian portion to be completed with the old bridge being dismantled to make way for the parallel bridge to begin construction. However, just months later during Hurricane Sally on September 15-16, 2020, a barge got stuck under the bridge before a crane fell onto one span of the bridge; this knocked almost the entire span into Pensacola Bay, rendering the bridge completely unusable; repairs were quickly arranged, with the bridge planned to be reopened in March 2021.

== Major intersections ==
County	Location	mi	km	Destinations	Notes
Escambia		0.000	0.000	US 98 west (SR-42) – Mobile	Alabama state line (Lillian Bridge over Perdido Bay)
Escambia	see US 98 (mile 0.000-12.049)				
Escambia	Pensacola	12.049	19.391	US 98 east / SR 292 (South Pace Boulevard)	east end of US 98 overlap; west end of US 98 Bus. overlap
Escambia	Pensacola	see US 98 Bus. (mile 0.000-2.290)			
Escambia	Pensacola	14.339	23.076	US 98 west (North 9th Avenue / SR 289 north)	east end of US 98 Bus. overlap; west end of US 98 overlap
see US 98 (mile 15.215-95.983)
Bay		95.107	153.060	US 98 east (Panama City Beach Parkway / SR 30A east) – East End of Beaches	east end of US 98 overlap; east end of state maintenance
Bay		96.427	155.184	Kelly Street (exit N)	
Bay	Laguna Beach	97.598	157.069	Exit M: Twin Lakes Drive	
Bay	Laguna Beach	97.868	157.503	Exit L: CR 3037 north (Wisteria Lane)	
Bay	Laguna Beach	98.679	158.808	Exit K: Toledo Place	
Bay	Panama City Beach–Laguna Beach line	99.149	159.565	west end of state maintenance	
Bay	Panama City Beach	100.145	161.168	Cobb Road (exit J)	
Bay	Panama City Beach	101.041	162.610	SR 79 north – West Bay, Northwest Florida / Beaches International Airport, Dog Track	
Bay	Panama City Beach	102.346	164.710	Exit H: Powell Adams Road	
Bay	Panama City Beach	102.739	165.342	Hills Road (exit G)	
Bay	Panama City Beach	103.580	166.696	Exit F: Nautlius Street	
Bay	Panama City Beach	104.189	167.676	SR 392 east (Hutchison Boulevard)	
Bay	Panama City Beach	104.784	168.634	Exit E: Clara Avenue to express route	
Bay	Panama City Beach	105.404	169.631	Alf Coleman Road to express route (exit D)	
Bay	Panama City Beach	105.988	170.571	east end of state maintenance	
Bay	Panama City Beach	106.070	170.703	R. Jackson Boulevard to express route (exit C)	
Bay	Panama City Beach	107.043	172.269	Thomas Drive	former SR 745
Bay	Panama City Beach	107.322	172.718	SR 392 west (Hutchison Boulevard / CR 392 east)	west end of state maintenance
Bay		107.822	173.523	Exit B: Moylan Road	
Bay		109.642	176.452	US 98 west (Panama City Beach Parkway / SR 30A)	interchange; west end of US 98 overlap
Bay	see US 98 (mile 109.931-113.859)				
Bay	Panama City	113.570	182.773	US 98 east (SR 30A) / SR 390 east (Beck Avenue) to US 231 – Cedar Grove	east end of US 98 overlap; west end of US 98 Bus. overlap; no left turn eastbound (onto SR 390)
Bay	see US 98 Bus. (mile 0.000-9.102)				
Bay	Parker–Callaway line	122.672	197.421	US 98 west (Tyndall Parkway / SR 30A) – Cedar Grove	east end of US 98 Bus. overlap; west end of US 98 overlap; no left turn eastbound
see US 98 (mile 123.672-283.185)
Taylor	Perry	282.185	454.133	US 19 north / US 27 / US 221 Truck north (Byron Butler Parkway / Hampton Springs Avenue / SR 20) – Tallahassee	west end of US 19 / US 27 Alt. / US 221 Truck overlap
Taylor	Perry	283.214	455.789	US 221 north (Jefferson Street / SR 55) / CR 361A south (Puckett Road) – Downtown Perry US 19 south / US 27 Alt. south / US 98 south (Byron Butler Parkway / SR 55) – Cross City, St. Petersburg	
1.000 mi = 1.609 km; 1.000 km = 0.621 mi: Concurrency terminus

== Related routes ==
=== Bay County Road 30 ===
County Road 30
- Location: Bay County

County Road 30 (CR 30) runs along a segment of Front Beach Road in Laguna Beach. The former section of SR 30 was relinquished by the Florida Department of Transportation in exchange for County Road 390. CR 30 runs from the junction with U.S. 98/SR 30A/SR 30 eastbound and ends at the intersection with Deluna Place on the city line of Panama City Beach, where SR 30 resumes.

=== State Road 30A ===
State Road 30A
- Location: Panama City Beach, Callaway, Panama City, Gulf County

State Road 30A (SR 30A) is a Florida Department of Transportation designation shared by four alternate routings of SR 30 in the Florida panhandle. Two segments have SR 30A signage; the other two do not as they are segments of U.S. Route 98 (US 98). Three of the four SR 30A segments are next to the shore of the Gulf of Mexico for most (if not all) of their length.

=== Walton County Road 30A ===
County Road 30A
- Location: Point Washington

Just west of Santa Rosa Beach, near East Hewlett Road, County Road 30A branches off Reddick Road (US 98/SR 30) and heads southeastward toward the shore of the Gulf of Mexico. While US 98/SR 30 continues through the heart of Point Washington State Forest, CR 30A follows the shoreline, passing through Grayton Beach and Seaside, before rejoining SR 30 near Inlet Beach.

=== Gulf County Road 30A & Franklin County Road 30A ===
County Road 30A
- Location: Gulf County, Franklin County

County Road 30A in Gulf and Franklin counties is a former segment of SR 30A. The road follows the shoreline of Bay San Blas, Indian Lagoon, and Saint Vincent Sound from the junction with SR 30A and SR 30E to US 98.

=== State Road 30B ===
State Road 30B
- Location: Pensacola

State Road 30B is an unsigned road in Pensacola known locally as Gregory Square. Running east from Gregory Street, it dead ends at a culdesac a mere 0.123 miles (0.198 km) later. The road was once part of State Road 30, until it was realigned. Gregory Street is maintained by FDOT and is inventoried as part of State Road 30, but it is not a signed road.

The entire route is in Pensacola, Escambia County.

mi	km	Destinations	Notes
0.000	0.000	Gregory Street	One-way street eastbound; western terminus; eastbound entrance and westbound exit
0.030	0.048	North Tarragona Street	Western end of two-way traffic
0.123	0.198	Dead end	
1.000 mi = 1.609 km; 1.000 km = 0.621 mi

=== Gulf County Road 30B ===
County Road 30B
- Location: Gulf County

County Road 30B (CR 30B), formerly State Road 30B, runs along St. Joseph Peninsula and is known locally as Indian Pass Road. It was a scenic route, with the western terminus at an intersection with CR 30A and an eastern terminus at the Indian Pass campground.

=== State Road 30E ===
State Road 30E
- Location: Cape San Blas

State Road 30E (SR 30E) exists on the St. Joseph Peninsula and is known locally as Cape San Blas Road. It's a scenic route, with the western terminus in St. Joseph Peninsula State Park near Eagle Harbor. Eastbound motorists drive by the T.H. Stone Memorial and the Cape San Blas lighthouse as they approach the terminus of SR 30E, an intersection with the SR 30A loop roughly a mile south of St. Joseph Point Lighthouse.

The entire route is in Gulf County.

Location	mi	km	Destinations	Notes
Cape San Blas	0.000	0.000	T.H. Stone Memorial St. Joseph Peninsula State Park	
	8.716	14.027	SR 30A west (CR 30A east) – Port St. Joe, Indian Pass	
1.000 mi = 1.609 km; 1.000 km = 0.621 mi

=== Bay County Roads 30A, 30B, 30C, 30H, and 30P ===
In Panama City Beach, a series of former state roads exist that were relinquished to Bay County control, all of which were alternatives to State Road 30. All routes are named after their former state road numbers, except for CR 30P, which is the former SR 30F.

=== State Road 384 ===
State Road 384
- Location: Panama City
- Length: 0.902 mi (1,452 m)
- Existed: 2021–present

State Road 384 is the designation of a pair of one-way frontage roads for US 98 (SR 30) in Panama City. The roads completed construction in 2021 as part of the 23rd Street Flyover Project which elevated US 98 over Seaport Drive, Collegiate Drive, 23rd Street (SR 368), and the Bay Line Railroad. Both segments of SR 384 are 0.45 miles (0.72 km) long, totalling 0.9 miles (1.4 km).

=== State Road 385 ===
State Road 385
- Location: Panama City
- Length: 0.043 mi (69 m)
- Existed: 2021–present

State Road 385, known as Seaport Drive, is a road totaling 0.04 miles (0.064 km) in length connecting the eastbound and westbound segments of SR 384 via the US 98 (SR 30) underpass. Originally the intersection of US 98 and Collegiate Drive, the road was modified and given state highway status as part of the 23rd Street Flyover Project.

Browse numbered routes
← SR 375	SR 384; SR 385	→ SR 388

=== State Road 392A ===
As the 16-mile-long SR 30 parallels the Gulf Coast, it passes through Hollywood Beach, Sunnyside, Laguna Beach, and Panama City Beach—popular "Spring Break" stops for U.S. college students—before curving back inland to rejoin US 98. The popularity of the Panama City Beach beachfront (with Miracle Strip Amusement Park) has often resulted in the overloading of Front Beach Road and the prompting of FDOT's "creation" of a second bypass of the downtown area: the 3 mile (4.8 km) long State Road 392A.

Unlike SR 30A, SR 392A is entirely within the city limits of Panama City Beach, no more than 0.4-mile (0.64 km) inland from the Gulf of Mexico. Locally known as Hutchison Boulevard, it is signed east–west. The western terminus is an intersection with SR 30 Alternate near Youpon Road; the eastern terminus is an intersection with SR 30 at Thomas Drive.

The entire route is in Panama City Beach, Bay County.

mi	km	Destinations	Notes
0.000	0.000	SR 30 (Front Beach Road)	
0.542	0.872	Exit E: Clara Avenue / Beach School Road - Beaches	
1.288	2.073	Alf Coleman Road / Miracle Strip Road - Beach (exit D)	
1.924	3.096	R. Jackson Boulevard (exit C)	
3.117	5.016	SR 30 (Front Beach Road) – Panama City, Sunnyside	
1.000 mi = 1.609 km; 1.000 km = 0.621 mi

Browse numbered routes
← SR 391	SR 392A	→ SR 393
