= Florida State Road 388 =

Highway in Florida

State Road 388
- Don Johnson Memorial Highway
- SR 388 highlighted in red, CR 388 highlighted in blue

Route information
- Maintained by FDOT
- Length: 12.339 mi (19.858 km)

Major junctions
- West end: SR 79 / West Bay Parkway near West Bay
- East end: SR 77 / Edwards Road near Vicksburg

Location
- Country: United States
- State: Florida
- Counties: Bay

Highway system
- Florida State Highway System; Interstate; US; State; Former; Pre‑1945; Toll; Scenic
← SR 385	→ SR 389

State Road 388 (SR 388) is a 12.3-mile-long (19.8 km) state highway in Bay County, Florida, that runs from SR 79 and West Bay Parkway northeast of West Bay east to SR 77 and Edwards Road southeast of Vicksburg. It is named the Don Johnson Memorial Highway.

The highway connects Northwest Florida Beaches International Airport with the rest of the Panama City–Lynn Haven, Florida metropolitan statistical area, as well as providing a major thoroughfare for commuters to travel around the north side of St. Andrews Bay.

== Route description ==
SR 388 begins at an intersection with SR 79 and West Bay Parkway north of the settlement of West Bay. The route travels east, crossing Crooked Creek on a bridge, before intersecting with the western segment of CR 388. Continuing slightly northeast, it reaches a roundabout with another West Bay Parkway, the access road for Northwest Florida Beaches International Airport. Continuing further northeast, it crosses Burnt Mill Creek on a bridge before continuing due east until it terminates at an intersection with SR 77 and Edwards Road near the ghost town of Vicksburg.

== History ==
The western segment of CR 388 was formerly a segment of SR 388. However, SR 388 was realigned onto a 4-mile-long (6.4 km) four-lane divided highway segment with bike lanes to the north, along with a roundabout being added to its intersection with the West Bay Parkway which leads to Northwest Florida Beaches International Airport, and a multi-use path on the south side of the road. The project cost $51 million, with the westbound lanes opening to traffic on December 6, 2022, and the eastbound lanes on February 22, 2023.

The eastern segment of CR 388 was also a former segment of SR 388.

== Major intersections ==
The entire route is in Bay County.

Location	mi	km	Destinations	Notes
	0.000	0.000	SR 79 / West Bay Parkway	Western terminus; continues as West Bay Parkway beyond SR 79
	12.339	19.858	SR 77 / Edwards Road	Eastern terminus; continues as Edwards Road beyond SR 77
1.000 mi = 1.609 km; 1.000 km = 0.621 mi

== Related routes ==
=== County Road 388 (Western) ===
County Road 388
- Connector Road
- Location: Rural Bay County
- Length: 3.6 mi (5.8 km)
- History: Commissioned on February 22, 2023

County Road 388 (CR 388), also known as Connector Road, is a 3.6-mile-long (5.8 km) county road in Bay County, Florida that is a former alignment of SR 388. It begins at an intersection with SR 79 at the settlement of West Bay and runs east before turning northeast and terminating at an intersection with SR 388 slightly southwest of its roundabout with the West Bay Parkway that leads to Northwest Florida Beaches International Airport.

==== Major intersections ====
The entire route is in Bay County.

Location	mi	km	Destinations	Notes
West Bay	0.0	0.0	SR 79 – Panama City Beach, Ebro	Western terminus
	3.6	5.8	SR 388	Eastern terminus
1.000 mi = 1.609 km; 1.000 km = 0.621 mi

=== County Road 388 (Eastern) ===
County Road 388
- Bennet Road; Vicksburg Road
- Location: Rural Bay County
- Length: 15.2 mi (24.5 km)

County Road 388 (CR 388), also known at points as Bennet Road and Vicksburg Road, is a 15.2-mile-long (24.5 km) county road in Bay County, Florida that is a former extension of SR 388 from SR 77 northeast of Vicksburg to US 231 and Jadewood Circle at the unincorporated community of Youngstown.

==== Major intersections ====
The entire route is in Bay County.

Location	mi	km	Destinations	Notes
	0.0	0.0	SR 77	Western terminus
	9.0	14.5	CR 2301 south / Blue Springs Road	Northern terminus of CR 2301
Youngstown	15.2	24.5	US 231 (SR 75) / Jadewood Circle	Eastern terminus; continues beyond US 231 as Jadewood Circle
1.000 mi = 1.609 km; 1.000 km = 0.621 mi
