= Florida State Road 391 =

State highway in Florida, United States

State Road 391

Route information
- Maintained by FDOT
- Length: 2.273 mi (3.658 km)

Major junctions
- South end: US 231 in Panama City
- North end: SR 390 in Pretty Bayou

Location
- Country: United States
- State: Florida
- Counties: Bay

Highway system
- Florida State Highway System; Interstate; US; State; Former; Pre‑1945; Toll; Scenic
← SR 390	→ SR 392A

State Road 391 (SR 391) is carried mainly by Airport Road (a.k.a. Airport Drive) in Bay County, Florida. Its southern terminus is at U.S. Route 231 (US 231 or SR 75), where it is carried briefly by Harrison Avenue. Its northern terminus is at SR 390.

Before the late 1970s, the state-maintained portion continued along Airport Road to its intersection with SR 327 (Lisenby Avenue) at the local major airport. In the late 1970s, county stickers were affixed to the state road signs along this portion of the highway. This segment is now maintained locally and has no highway number shields.

== Major intersections ==
The entire route is in Bay County.

Location	mi	km	Destinations	Notes
Panama City	0.000	0.000	US 98 (15th Street / SR 30A) / US 231 (SR 75)	
Panama City	1.554	2.501	SR 368 (23rd Street)	
Panama City	1.874	3.016	SR 327 (Lisenby Avenue)	
Pretty Bayou	2.273	3.658	SR 390 (St. Andrews Boulevard) – Lynn Haven	
1.000 mi = 1.609 km; 1.000 km = 0.621 mi
