= Santa Monica, Florida =

Santa Monica
- Unincorporated Community
- Location within Florida Location within the United States
- Coordinates: 30°15′01″N 85°56′38″W
- Country: United States
- State: Florida
- County: Bay
- Incorporated (town): None
- Incorporated (city): None

Government
  - Commissioner: Philip "Griff" Griffitts
- Time zone: UTC-6 (Central (CST))
  - Summer (DST): UTC-5 (CDT)
- ZIP code: 32413
- Area code: 850

Santa Monica is an unincorporated community in Bay County, Florida, United States. It is part of the Panama City–Lynn Haven–Panama City Beach Metropolitan Statistical Area. Its population is 60.

Santa Monica is located along State Road 30 (former US 98 Alternate) west of Laguna Beach.
