= Fountain, Florida =

Coordinates: 30°28′44″N 85°25′11″W

- Unincorporated Community
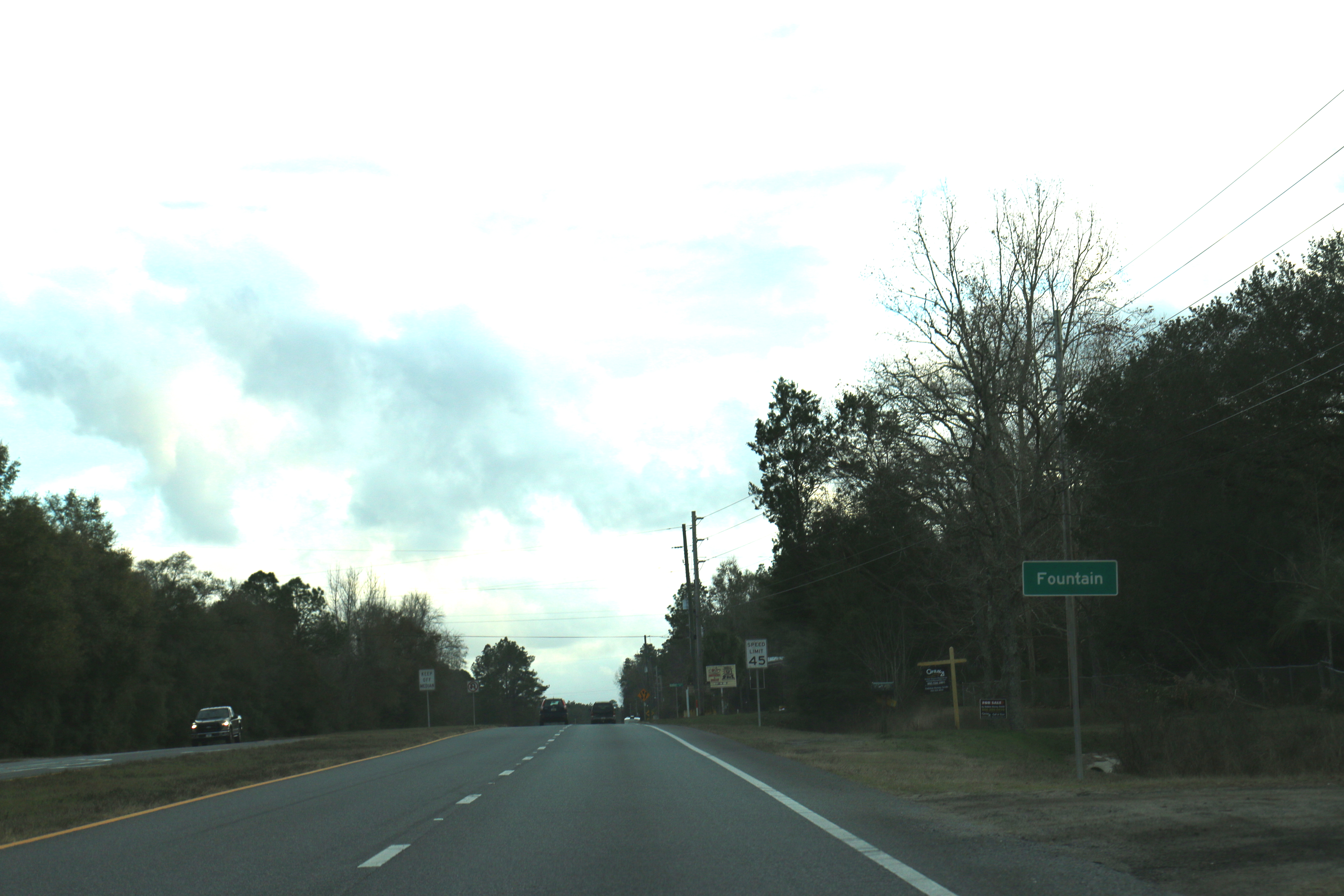
- The sign for Fountain on US 231 south bound
- Interactive map of Fountain, Florida
- Country: United States
- State: Florida
- County: Bay

Government
  - Commissioner: Doug Moore
- Time zone: UTC-6 (Central (CST))
  - Summer (DST): UTC-5 (CDT)
- ZIP code: 32438
- Area code: 850

Fountain is an unincorporated community in Bay County, Florida, United States. It is part of the Panama City–Lynn Haven–Panama City Beach Metropolitan Statistical Area. The main roads through Fountain are U.S. 231 and State Road 20 and SR 388.

Via US 231, Dothan, Alabama is 55 mi (89 km) north, and Panama City is 28 mi (45 km) south-southwest.
