= Bayou George, Florida =

Coordinates: 30°15′46″N 85°32′24″W

- Unincorporated Community
- Interactive map of Bayou George, Florida
- Country: United States
- State: Florida
- County: Bay
- Time zone: UTC-6 (Central (CST))
  - Summer (DST): UTC-5 (CDT)
- ZIP code: 32466
- Area code: 850

Bayou George is an unincorporated community in Bay County, Florida, United States. It is part of the Panama City–Lynn Haven–Panama City Beach Metropolitan Statistical Area. Bayou George is named after a waterway that flows into part of Saint Andrews Bay. The main roads through the community are US 231 and former SR 167, now County Road 2301.
