= First Presbyterian Church (Lynn Haven, Florida) =

Church in Lynn Haven, Florida

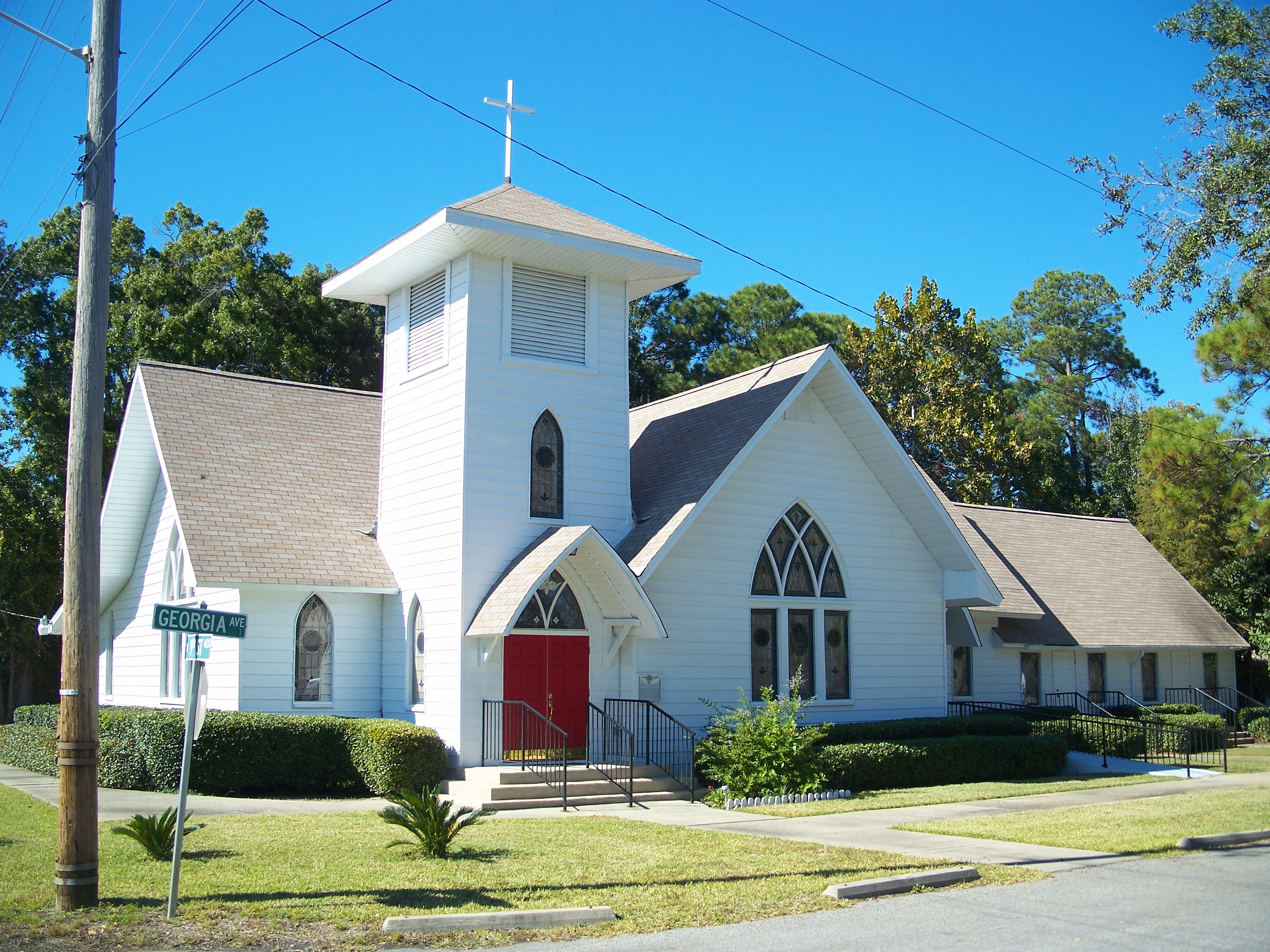
- Interactive map of the First Presbyterian Church area

General information
- Architectural style: Carpenter Gothic
- Location: 810 Georgia Avenue, Lynn Haven, Florida, United States
- Coordinates: 30.246037°N 85.65237°W
- Construction started: 1911
- Completed: 1911
- Client: First Presbyterian Church

Technical details
- Structural system: wooden

The First Presbyterian Church, built in 1911, is a historic Carpenter Gothic-style Presbyterian church located in Lynn Haven. Bay County, Florida, USA.

In 1989, the First Presbyterian Church was listed as the Lynn Haven Presbyterian Church in A Guide to Florida's Historic Architecture, published by the University of Florida Press. The listing described the church building as an "interesting architectural study in scale and massing".

First Presbyterian is still an active church in the Presbytery of Florida. The Rev. Lisa Martin is the current pastor.
