= Southport, Florida =

- Unincorporated Community
- Interactive map of Southport, Florida
- Country: United States
- State: Florida
- County: Bay
- Incorporated (town): None
- Incorporated (city): None

Government
  - Commissioner: Doug Moore
- Time zone: UTC-6 (Central (CST))
  - Summer (DST): UTC-5 (CDT)
- ZIP code: 32409
- Area code: 850

Southport is an unincorporated community in Bay County, Florida, United States. It is located along the north side of North Bay and west of Deer Point Lake. The main roads through the community are State Road 77, Edwards Rd, County Road 388, State Road 20, and County Road 2321. It is also part of the Panama City–Lynn Haven–Panama City Beach Metropolitan Statistical Area. The area has seen exponential development post Hurricane Michael due to population influx.

== Geography ==
Southport is located north of Panama City at 30.289444 N, -85.640556 W (30° 17′ 22″ N, 85° 38′ 26″ W). Florida State Road 77 is the main route through the community, leading north 38 mi (61 km) to Chipley on Interstate 10 and south 11 mi (18 km) to the center of Panama City.

== Schools ==
Southport Florida has two schools, Southport Elementary School and Deane Bozeman Middle School. They are part of the Bay County School District.
