= Upper Grand Lagoon, Florida =

- Census-designated place
- Interactive map outlining Upper Grand Lagoon
- Coordinates: 30°10′26″N 85°45′41″W
- Country: United States
- State: Florida
- County: Bay

Area
  - Total: 15.91 sq mi (41.21 km^{2})
  - Land: 8.10 sq mi (20.98 km^{2})
  - Water: 7.81 sq mi (20.23 km^{2})
- Elevation: 0 ft (0 m)

Population (2020)
  - Total: 15,778
  - Density: 1,947.6/sq mi (751.96/km^{2})
- Time zone: UTC-6 (Central (CST))
  - Summer (DST): UTC-5 (CDT)
- FIPS code: 12-73312
- GNIS feature ID: 2402953

Upper Grand Lagoon is a census-designated place (CDP) in Bay County, Florida, United States. The population was 15,778 at the 2020 census, up from 13,963 at the 2010 census. It is part of the Panama City–Panama City Beach, Florida Metropolitan Statistical Area.

== Geography ==
According to the United States Census Bureau, the CDP has a total area of 15.9 square miles (41.2 km^{2}), of which 8.1 square miles (21.0 km^{2}) is land and 7.8 square miles (20.2 km^{2}), or 49.13%, is water.

== Demographics ==
Historical population
Census	Pop.	Note	%±
1980	3,314		—
1990	7,855		137.0%
2000	10,889		38.6%
2010	13,963		28.2%
2020	15,778		13.0%

=== 2020 census ===
As of the 2020 census, Upper Grand Lagoon had a population of 15,778. The median age was 45.7 years. 18.1% of residents were under the age of 18 and 20.1% of residents were 65 years of age or older. For every 100 females there were 98.5 males, and for every 100 females age 18 and over there were 97.3 males age 18 and over.

99.4% of residents lived in urban areas, while 0.6% lived in rural areas.

There were 6,722 households in Upper Grand Lagoon, of which 24.2% had children under the age of 18 living in them. Of all households, 47.6% were married-couple households, 19.8% were households with a male householder and no spouse or partner present, and 24.5% were households with a female householder and no spouse or partner present. About 27.0% of all households were made up of individuals and 10.3% had someone living alone who was 65 years of age or older.

There were 8,896 housing units, of which 24.4% were vacant. The homeowner vacancy rate was 2.1% and the rental vacancy rate was 11.9%.

Racial composition as of the 2020 census
Race	Number	Percent
White	12,800	81.1%
Black or African American	704	4.5%
American Indian and Alaska Native	89	0.6%
Asian	366	2.3%
Native Hawaiian and Other Pacific Islander	24	0.2%
Some other race	349	2.2%
Two or more races	1,446	9.2%
Hispanic or Latino (of any race)	1,134	7.2%

=== 2000 census ===
As of the census of 2000, there were 10,889 people, 4,615 households, and 3,032 families residing in the CDP. The population density was 1,320.2 inhabitants per square mile (509.7/km^{2}). There were 5,733 housing units at an average density of 695.1 per square mile (268.4/km^{2}). The racial makeup of the CDP was 93.66% White, 1.41% African American, 0.82% Native American, 1.63% Asian, 0.09% Pacific Islander, 0.68% from other races, and 1.70% from two or more races. Hispanic or Latino of any race were 2.45% of the population.

There were 4,615 households, out of which 29.3% had children under the age of 18 living with them, 52.2% were married couples living together, 9.7% had a female householder with no husband present, and 34.3% were non-families. 27.5% of all households were made up of individuals, and 7.9% had someone living alone who was 65 years of age or older. The average household size was 2.33 and the average family size was 2.83.

In the CDP, the population was spread out, with 22.7% under the age of 18, 7.2% from 18 to 24, 31.8% from 25 to 44, 25.4% from 45 to 64, and 12.8% who were 65 years of age or older. The median age was 39 years. For every 100 females, there were 105.0 males. For every 100 females age 18 and over, there were 103.6 males.

The median income for a household in the CDP was $42,060, and the median income for a family was $55,000. Males had a median income of $35,179 versus $25,056 for females. The per capita income for the CDP was $24,996. About 7.5% of families and 9.6% of the population were below the poverty line, including 14.4% of those under age 18 and 7.0% of those age 65 or over.
