= U.S. Route 98 =

Highway in the United States

U.S. Route 98
- US 98 highlighted in red

Route information
- Length: 962.5 mi (1,549.0 km)
- Existed: 1933–present

Major junctions
- West end: US 84 in Bude, MS
- I-55 at Summit, MS; I-59 at Hattiesburg, MS; I-65 at Mobile, AL; I-10 at Mobile and Spanish Fort, AL; I-110 at Pensacola, FL; I-75 near Brooksville, FL; I-4 at Lakeland, FL; Florida's Turnpike at West Palm Beach, FL; I-95 at West Palm Beach, FL; US 1 at West Palm Beach, FL
- East end: SR A1A / SR 80 at Palm Beach, FL

Location
- Country: United States
- States: Mississippi, Alabama, Florida

Highway system
- United States Numbered Highway System; List; Special; Divided
← US 97	→ US 99

U.S. Route 98 (US 98) is an east–west United States Highway in the Southeastern United States that runs from western Mississippi to southern Florida. It was established in 1933 as a route between Pensacola and Apalachicola, Florida, and has since been extended westward into Mississippi and eastward across the Florida Peninsula. It runs along much of the Gulf Coast between Mobile, Alabama, and Crystal River, Florida, including extensive sections closely following the coast between Mobile and St. Marks, Florida. The highway's western terminus is with US 84 in Bude, Mississippi. Its eastern terminus is Palm Beach, Florida, at State Road A1A (SR A1A) near the Mar-a-Lago resort.

== Route description ==
U.S. 98's western terminus is in Mississippi, and its eastern terminus is in Florida. Much of its route through Alabama and Florida falls within coastal counties.

=== Mississippi ===
US 98 enters the state from the southeast and immediately widens to four lanes. It bypasses Lucedale to the north, and an interchange with Mississippi Highway 63 provides four-laned access to Pascagoula on the Mississippi Gulf Coast, increasing road capacity for hurricane evacuations. At Hattiesburg, an interchange with U.S. Route 49 provides four-laned access to Gulfport (to the south) and Jackson (to the north). The road continues west from its intersection with US 49 to Interstate 59 at exit 59, with which it is concurrent through exit 65 (Hardy Street). The highway runs westward through Columbia before meeting US 51 in McComb. It then joins Interstate 55 from exit 15 (South McComb) to exit 20 (Summit). The last remaining two-laned section of US 98 in Mississippi then runs northwestward to its terminus near Bude in Meadville at US 84.

US 98 serves as a primary hurricane evacuation route in southern Mississippi, connecting cities along the Mississippi Sound to inland destinations further north.

The Mississippi section of US 98 is defined in Mississippi Code Annotated § 65-3-3.

=== Alabama ===
In Alabama, US 98 is paired with unsigned State Route 42 (SR 42). The route enters Alabama from the east near Lillian in rural Baldwin County. At Daphne, US 98 begins a concurrency with US 90. US 90 and 98 junction I-10 at Daphne on the eastern shore of Mobile Bay, then again on the western side of the bay as they enter downtown Mobile. As the two routes approach the Mobile River, US 98 is split into two routes, with a US 98 Truck route crossing the Mobile River via the Cochrane–Africatown USA Bridge, co-signed with US 90. Passenger car traffic passes directly into town under the Mobile River via the Bankhead Tunnel. Once the truck route rejoins the main route in downtown Mobile, US 98 assumes a northwestward trajectory, and enters Mississippi near the community of Wilmer in western Mobile County. US 98 is the southern terminus of two major U.S. highways: US 31, at Spanish Fort, and US 45 in Mobile.

The safety of the route, or the lack thereof, has earned the road the nickname "Bloody 98". The existing route between Semmes and the Mississippi state line is a two-lane undivided highway, and widening the route has been delayed due to a lack of budget and concern over pollution of Big Creek Lake, which supplies drinking water to the city of Mobile and other area towns. A project to construct a bypass route, State Route 158, was completed in October 2023, at a cost of $200 million; however, a portion of the route remains two lanes, with no timeline as to completion to the planned four-lane configuration.

=== Florida ===
A US 98 shield used in Florida prior to 1993

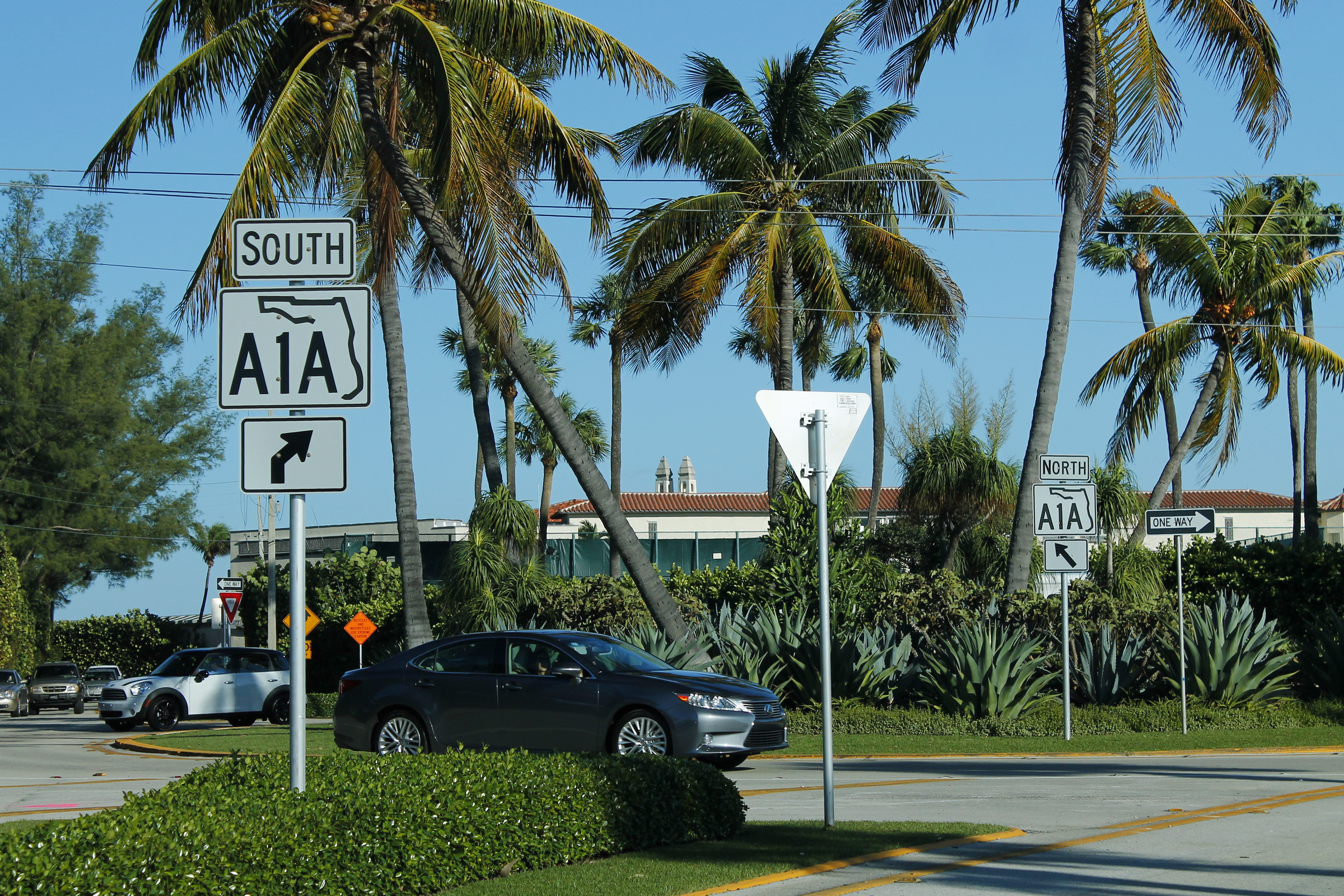
Eastern terminus of US 98/SR 80 at a roundabout with SR A1A in Palm Beach.

Within Florida, US 98 is signed as an east–west highway from the Alabama-Florida state line to Perry. Throughout most of the Florida Peninsula, the road is marked as a north–south road, but directions return to east–west on the northeast shore of Lake Okeechobee.

Concurrencies include US 441 from Royal Palm Beach to Okeechobee, US 27 from South Sebring to West Frostproof, US 17 from Fort Meade to Bartow, US 301 from Clinton Heights to Moss Town, SR 50 from Ridge Manor to Brooksville, SR 50A then US 41 in Brooksville, US 19 from Chassahowitzka to Perry, ALT US 27 from Chiefland to Perry, US 319 in Medart and from St. Theresa to Port St. Joe, and US 90 in Pensacola. The hidden designation for most of US 98 across the panhandle of the state of Florida is State Route 30. Between Chassahowitzka and Palm Beach, the hidden designation is State Route 700. There is a 60 mph speed limit east of Tyndall Air Force Base outside of Panama City all the way to Perry.

== History ==
US 98 was first commissioned in 1934. At that time, its entire route was within Florida, traveling from Pensacola to Apalachicola. In 1952, the eastern end was extended to its present terminus in Palm Beach, Florida. In 1955, the western terminus was extended westward to Natchez, Mississippi. In 1999, the western end of US 98 was truncated to its intersection with US 84 at Meadville, Mississippi, although it continued to be signed concurrently with US 84 to Washington, Mississippi until 2008.

== Major intersections ==
Mississippi
US 84 in Bude.
I-55 in Summit. The highways travel concurrently to McComb.
US 51 in McComb
I-59 in Hattiesburg. The highways travel concurrently to south of Hattiesburg.
US 11 in Hattiesburg
US 49 in Hattiesburg
Alabama
I-65 in Mobile
US 45 in Mobile
US 90 in Mobile. The highways travel concurrently through Mobile.
US 90 in Mobile. The highways travel concurrently to Spanish Fort.
I-10 in Mobile
US 31 in Spanish Fort
I-10 in Spanish Fort
I-10 / US 90 in Daphne. US 90/US 98 travels concurrently through Daphne.
Florida
US 90 in Pensacola. The highways travel concurrently through Pensacola.
US 29 in Pensacola
I-110 in Pensacola
US 331 southeast of Santa Rosa Beach
US 231 in Panama City
US 319 east of Apalachicola. The highways travel concurrently to west-southwest of St. Teresa.
US 319 in Medart. The highways travel concurrently to north-northeast of Medart.
US 19 / US 27 in Perry. US 19/US 98 travels concurrently to northeast of Chassahowitzka.
US 221 in Perry
US 129 in Chiefland
US 41 in Brooksville. The highways travel concurrently through Brooksville.
I-75 west-northwest of Ridge Manor
US 301 in Lacoochee. The highways travel concurrently to south of Dade City.
I-4 in Lakeland
US 92 in Lakeland
US 17 in Bartow. The highways travel concurrently to Fort Meade.
US 27 east of West Frostproof. The highways travel concurrently to west-southwest of Spring Lake.
US 441 in Okeechobee. The highways travel concurrently to Royal Palm Beach.
Florida's Turnpike at West Palm Beach
I-95 in West Palm Beach
US 1 in West Palm Beach
SR A1A in Palm Beach

== In popular culture ==
Blue Mountain recorded a song titled "Bloody 98," specifically referring to a two-laned section of the highway between Mobile, Alabama and Hattiesburg, Mississippi.

== Special and suffixed routes ==
- U.S. Route 98 Business in Pensacola, Florida
- U.S. Route 98 Toll from Pensacola, Florida to Navarre, Florida
- U.S. Route 98 Bypass in Panama City Beach, Florida
- U.S. Route 98 Alternate in Panama City Beach, Florida
- U.S. Route 98 Business in Panama City, Florida
- U.S. Route 98 Truck in Brooksville, Florida
- U.S. Route 98 Truck in Dade City, Florida
- U.S. Route 98 Business in Dade City, Florida
- U.S. Route 98 Business in Lakeland, Florida
- U.S. Route 98 Business in Bartow, Florida
- U.S Route 98 Alternate in Fairhope, Alabama

Browse numbered routes
← US 90	MS	→ I-110
← SR 97	AL	→ SR 99
← SR 97	FL	→ SR 100
