= Hiland Park, Florida =

- Unincorporated Place
- Location in Bay County and the state of Florida
- Coordinates: 30°12′10″N 85°37′14″W
- Country: United States
- State: Florida
- County: Bay

Government
  - Commissioner: Tommy Hamm (R)

Area
  - Total: 1.1 sq mi (2.9 km^{2})
  - Land: 1.1 sq mi (2.9 km^{2})
  - Water: 0 sq mi (0 km^{2})
- Elevation: 36 ft (11 m)

Population (2000)
  - Total: 999
  - Density: 892/sq mi (344.5/km^{2})
- Time zone: UTC-6 (Central (CST))
  - Summer (DST): UTC-5 (CDT)
- FIPS code: 12-30575
- GNIS feature ID: 0284019

Hiland Park is a former census-designated place (CDP) in Bay County, Florida, United States. The population was 999 at the 2000 census. Most of the area is now part of the city of Lynn Haven. It is part of the Panama City–Lynn Haven–Panama City Beach Metropolitan Statistical Area.

== Geography ==
Hiland Park is located at 30°12′10″N 85°37′14″W.

According to the United States Census Bureau, the CDP has a total area of 1.1 square miles (2.8 km^{2}), all land.

== Demographics ==
Historical population
Census	Pop.	Note	%±
1970	3,691		—
1980	4,763		29.0%
1990	3,865		−18.9%
2000	999		−74.2%
source: 2010

As of the census of 2000, there were 999 people, 372 households, and 277 families residing in the CDP. The population density was 882.0 inhabitants per square mile (340.5/km^{2}). There were 410 housing units at an average density of 362.0 per square mile (139.8/km^{2}). The racial makeup of the CDP was 89.29% White, 7.51% African American, 0.60% Native American, 1.80% Asian, 0.10% from other races, and 0.70% from two or more races. Hispanic or Latino of any race were 1.20% of the population.

There were 372 households, out of which 31.5% had children under the age of 18 living with them, 55.1% were married couples living together, 13.7% had a female householder with no husband present, and 25.5% were non-families. 19.1% of all households were made up of individuals, and 6.5% had someone living alone who was 65 years of age or older. The average household size was 2.66 and the average family size was 2.99.

In the CDP, the population was spread out, with 24.2% under the age of 18, 9.4% from 18 to 24, 28.0% from 25 to 44, 26.5% from 45 to 64, and 11.8% who were 65 years of age or older. The median age was 38 years. For every 100 females, there were 97.0 males. For every 100 females age 18 and over, there were 90.7 males.

The median income for a household in the CDP was $37,896, and the median income for a family was $39,129. Males had a median income of $29,315 versus $17,734 for females. The per capita income for the CDP was $17,987. About 12.0% of families and 19.3% of the population were below the poverty line, including 38.9% of those under age 18 and none of those age 65 or over.
