= Vicksburg, Florida =

Coordinates: 30.3256°N 85.6647°W

Vicksburg is a ghost town in Bay County, Florida, United States, located near the intersection of State Road 77 and County Road 388.

== Geography ==
Vicksburg is located at 30°20'N 85°40'W (30.3256,-85.6647).

== See also ==
- List of ghost towns in Florida
