= Youngstown, Florida =

Coordinates: 30°21′52″N 85°26′18″W

- Unincorporated Community
- Interactive map of Youngstown, Florida
- Country: United States
- State: Florida
- County: Bay
- Incorporated (town): None
- Incorporated (city): None
- Time zone: UTC-6 (Central (CST))
  - Summer (DST): UTC-5 (CDT)
- ZIP code: 32466
- Area code: 850

Youngstown is an unincorporated community in Bay County, Florida, United States. It was the site of an unsolved deadly train derailment in 1978. It is part of the Panama City–Lynn Haven–Panama City Beach Metropolitan Statistical Area.

== Geography ==
The main road through Youngstown is US 231, which runs from north to south through the community. US 231 leads north 62 mi (100 km) to Dothan, Alabama and southwest 20 mi (32 km) to Panama City.

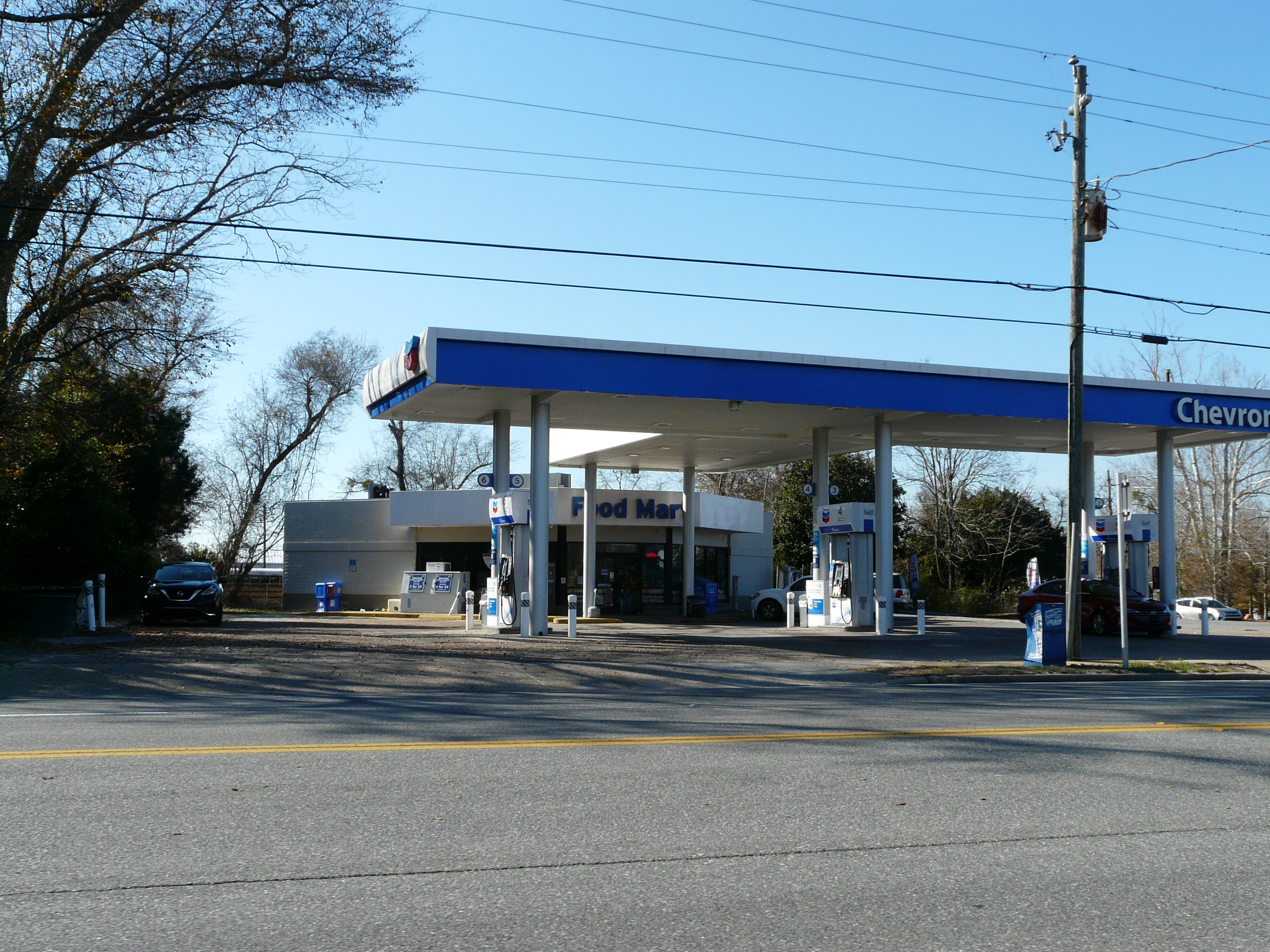
US Route 231 in Youngstown, Florida

US 231 is also the eastern terminus of County Road 388.
