= List of U.S. Highways in Florida =

United States Numbered Highways of the Florida State Highway System
- Standard US Highway shields in Florida

System information
- Notes: State Roads are generally state-maintained.

Highway names
- Interstates: Interstate X (I-X)
- US Highways: U.S. Highway X (US X)
- State: State Road X (SR X)

System links
- Florida State Highway System; Interstate; US; State; Former; Pre‑1945; Toll; Scenic

The U.S. Highways in Florida are the segments of the United States Numbered Highway System maintained by the Florida Department of Transportation (FDOT). Prior to 1993, Florida used colored shields for its U.S. Highways. There are 18 current U.S. Highways in Florida and 2 former U.S. Highways.

== Mainline highways ==
Number	Length (mi)	Length (km)	Southern or western terminus	Northern or eastern terminus	Formed	Removed	Notes
US 1	545.03	877.14	Whitehead Street / Fleming Street in Key West	US 1 / US 23 / US 301 / SR 4 / SR 15 near Folkston, GA	1926	current	
US 17	317.07	510.27	US 41 / SR 35 / SR 45 in Punta Gorda	US 17 / SR 25 near Kingsland, GA	1926	current	
US 19	261.968	421.597	US 41 / SR 45 / SR 55 in Memphis	US 19 / SR 3 / SR 300 near Thomasville, GA	1926	current	
US 23	37.656	60.601	US 1 / US 17 / SR 5 / SR 15 / SR 115 / SR 139 / SR 228 in Jacksonville	US 1 / US 23 / US 301 / SR 4 / SR 15 near Folkston, GA	1926	current	
US 27	496.352	798.801	US 1 / SR 5 / SR 948 in Miami	US 27 / SR 1 / SR 111 near Calvary, GA	1926	current	
US 29	43.6	70.2	US 90 / US 98 / SR 10A / SR 30 / SR 95 in Pensacola	US 29 / SR 15 / SR 113 in Flomaton, AL	1926	current	
US 41	478.92	770.75	US 1 / SR 5 / SR 90 in Miami	US 41 / SR 7 near Lake Park, GA	1926	current	Signed as east–west from Naples to Miami
US 90	408.723	657.776	US 90 / SR 16 near Seminole, AL	SR A1A / SR 212 in Jacksonville Beach	1926	current	
US 92	181.363	291.875	US 19 Alt. / SR 595 / SR 687 in St. Petersburg	SR A1A in Daytona Beach	1926	current	
US 94	264.16	425.12	US 41 in Naples	US 1 in Miami	1926	1949	Resigned as US 41
US 98	670.959	1,079.804	US 98 / SR 42 in Lillian, AL	SR A1A / SR 700 in Palm Beach	1933	current	Signed as north–south from Perry to Palm Beach
US 129	87.881	141.431	US 19 / US 27 Alt. / US 98 / SR 55 in Chiefland	US 129 / SR 11 in Statenville, GA	1941	current	
US 192	74.746	120.292	US 27 / SR 25 in Four Corners	SR A1A / SR 500 in Indialantic	1926	current	
US 221	39.978	64.338	US 19 / US 27 Alt. / US 98 / SR 55 in Perry	US 221 / SR 76 in Quitman, GA	1930	current	
US 231	66.591	107.168	US 98 Bus. / SR 30 / SR 75 in Panama City	US 231 / SR 1 in Madrid, AL	1926	current	
US 301	269.316	433.422	US 41 / SR 45 / SR 683 in Sarasota	US 1 / US 23 / US 301 / SR 4 / SR 15 near Folkston, GA	1949	current	
US 319	96.791	155.770	US 98 / SR 30 in Apalachicola	US 319 / SR 35 near Thomasville, GA	1933	current	
US 331	49.356	79.431	US 98 / SR 30 / SR 83 in Santa Rosa Beach	US 331 / SR 9 near Florala, AL	—	—	
US 441	433.050	696.926	US 41 / SR 7 / SR 90 in Miami	US 441 / SR 89 near Fargo, GA	1926	current	
US 541	50	80	US 41 / SR 43 / SR 55 in Palmetto	US 41 / SR 685 in Lutz	1931	1951	Became US 41 Bus. as well as parts of US 41 and US 301
Former

== Special routes ==
Number	Length (mi)	Length (km)	Southern or western terminus	Northern or eastern terminus	Formed	Removed	Notes
US 1 Bus.	3.3	5.3	US 1 / SR 5 / Ponce de Leon Boulevard in St. Augustine	US 1 / SR 5 / Dixie Highway in St. Augustine	1959	current	
US 1 Alt.	7.3	11.7	US 1 / SR 5 / SR 126 in Jacksonville	US 1 / US 17 / SR 5 / SR 15 / SR 115 in Jacksonville	—	—	
US 1 Bus.	—	—	—	—	1960	1968	
US 1 Alt.	—	—	—	—	—	—	
US 1 Alt.	—	—	US 1 / US 90 / SR 13 near Acosta Bridge	US 1 / US 23 / SR 139 in Jacksonville	1958	1960	Currently signed as SR 13, and part of SR 211
US 17 Truck	3.3	5.3	US 17 / US 92 / SR 423 / SR 600 in Winter Park	US 17 / US 92 / SR 600 / CR 438A in Maitland	—	—	
US 17 Truck	—	—	—	—	—	—	Resigned as US 17 / US 92
US 17 Alt.	—	—	—	—	—	—	
US 19 Alt.	40.08	64.50	US 92 / SR 595 / SR 687 in St. Petersburg	US 19 / SR 55 / SR 595 in Holiday	1951	current	
US 19 Alt.	—	—	—	—	—	—	
US 27 Alt.	94	151	US 27 / US 41 / SR 45 / SR 121 / SR 500 in Williston	US 19 / US 27 / US 98 / SR 20 / SR 30 / SR 55 in Perry	—	—	
US 27 Alt.	—	—	—	—	—	—	Currently signed as SR 17
US 27 Alt.	—	—	—	—	—	—	Currently signed as SR 17
US 27 Alt.	—	—	US 27 / US 441 / SR 500 in Lady Lake	US 27 / US 301 / US 441 / SR 500 in Belleview	—	—	Now CR 25A in Lake and Marion counties
US 41 Bus.	6.5	10.5	US 41 / SR 45 / SR 82 / SR 867 in Fort Myers	US 41 / SR 45 near North Fort Myers	—	—	
US 41 Bus.	2.9	4.7	US 41 / SR 45 / SR 45A in Venice	US 41 / SR 45 / SR 45A in Venice	1965	current	
US 41 Bus.	5.8	9.3	US 41 / SR 45 / SR 684 in Bradenton	US 41 / SR 45 / SR 55 in Memphis	—	—	
US 41 Bus.	16.7	26.9	US 41 / SR 45 / SR 676 in Palm River-Clair Mel	US 41 / SR 45 / SR 685 in Lutz	1951	current	
US 90 Alt.	12.9	20.8	US 90 in Beulah	US 90 in Ferry Pass	—	—	
US 90 Alt.	6.7	10.8	US 90 / SR 10 / SR 212 in Jacksonville	US 90 / SR 115 / SR 212 in Jacksonville	—	—	
US 92 Truck	3.3	5.3	US 17 / US 92 / SR 423 / SR 600 in Winter Park	US 17 / US 92 / SR 600 / CR 438A in Maitland	—	—	
US 92 Bus.	—	—	—	—	—	—	
US 92 Truck	—	—	—	—	—	—	Resigned as US 17 / US 92
US 98 Bus.	—	—	US 98 / SR 292 in Pensacola	US 98 in Pensacola	—	—	
US 98 Alt.	—	—	—	—	—	—	
US 98 Bus.	—	—	—	—	—	—	
US 98 Bus.	—	—	US 98 / SR 700 near Brooksville	US 98 / SR 50 / SR 700 in Brooksville	—	—	
US 98 Bus.	—	—	US 98 Truck / US 301 Truck / SR 533 in Dade City	US 98 Truck / US 301 Truck / SR 533 in Dade City	—	—	
US 98 Truck	—	—	US 98 Bus. / US 301 Bus. / SR 35 / SR 39 / SR 700 in Dade City	US 98 Bus. / US 301 Bus. / SR 35 / SR 39 / SR 700 in Dade City	—	—	Resigned as US 98 / US 301
US 98 Toll	—	—	—	—	—	—	
US 98 Byp.	—	—	—	—	—	—	
US 98 Bus.	—	—	—	—	—	—	
US 98 Bus.	—	—	—	—	—	—	
US 129 Alt.	—	—	US 19 / US 27 Alt. / US 98 / SR 55 in Old Town	US 27 / US 129 / SR 20 in Branford	1959	1970	Almost entirely SR 349 today
US 221 Truck	—	—	US 19 / US 27 Alt. / US 98 / US 221 in Perry	US 221 / CR 359A north of Perry	—	—	
US 301 Bus.	—	—	US 98 Truck / US 301 Truck / SR 533 in Dade City	US 98 Truck / US 301 Truck / SR 533 in Dade City	—	—	Currently signed as SR 39
US 301 Truck	—	—	US 98 Bus. / US 301 Bus. / SR 35 / SR 39 / SR 700 in Dade City	US 98 Bus. / US 301 Bus. / SR 35 / SR 39 / SR 700 in Dade City	—	—	
US 301 Alt.	—	—	US 301 / US 441 / SR 25 / SR 200 in Ocala	US 301 / SR 200 in Citra	—	—	Now CR 200A
US 319 Alt.	—	—	—	—	—	—	
US 319 Bus.	—	—	—	—	—	—	
US 441 Truck	—	—	US 41 / US 441 / SR 25 in Lake City	US 441 / CR 100A / CR 250 in Lake City	—	—	Runs along US 41, CR 100A, and CR 250
US 441 Bus.	—	—	US 441 / SR 500 in Tangerine	US 441 / SR 19 / SR 44 / SR 500 in Tavares	—	—	Now signed as CR Old 441 and occasionally CR 500A
US 441 Alt.	—	—	US 27 / US 441 / SR 500 in Lady Lake	US 27 / US 301 / US 441 / SR 500 in Belleview	—	—	Now CR 25A in Lake and Marion counties
US 441 Alt.	—	—	US 301 / US 441 / SR 25 / SR 200 in Ocala	US 441 / SR 25 in Derrick	—	—	Now CR 25A
US 541 Alt.	—	—	—	—	—	—	
Former
