= Parker, Florida =

- City
- City of Parker
- Seal
- Motto: "A Community of Friendly Neighbors"
- Interactive map outlining Parker
- Coordinates: 30°07′24″N 85°36′02″W
- Country: United States
- State: Florida
- County: Bay
- Settled (Austerlitz): 1830
- Incorporated (City of Parker): July 1967

Government
  - Type: Mayor-Council
  - Mayor: Andrew Kelly
  - Mayor Pro Tem: Tonya Barrow
  - Council Members: Katy Bodiford, Mark Rega, and Ron Chaple
  - City Clerk: Rachelle Stanley
  - City Attorney: Timothy J. Sloan

Area
  - Total: 2.43 sq mi (6.30 km^{2})
  - Land: 1.91 sq mi (4.95 km^{2})
  - Water: 0.52 sq mi (1.35 km^{2})
- Elevation: 10 ft (3.0 m)

Population (2020)
  - Total: 4,010
  - Density: 2,097.9/sq mi (809.99/km^{2})
- Time zone: UTC-6 (Central (CST))
  - Summer (DST): UTC-5 (CDT)
- ZIP code: 32404
- Area code(s): 850, 448
- FIPS code: 12-55075
- GNIS feature ID: 2404479
- Website: http://www.cityofparker.com

Parker is a city in Bay County, Florida, United States. It is part of the Panama City–Panama City Beach, Florida Metropolitan Statistical Area. As of the 2020 US census, it had a population of 4,010, down from 4,317 at the 2010 census.

== Geography ==
According to the United States Census Bureau, the city has a total area of 6.3 km^{2} (2.4 mi^{2}), of which 1.9 square miles (4.9 km^{2}) is land and 0.5 square miles (1.3 km^{2}) (20.16%) is water.

=== Climate ===
The City of Parker is part of the humid subtropical climate zone with a Köppen Climate Classification of "Cfa" (C = mild temperate, f = fully humid, and a = hot summer)

== Demographics ==
Historical population
Census	Pop.	Note	%±
1960	2,669		—
1970	4,212		57.8%
1980	4,298		2.0%
1990	4,598		7.0%
2000	4,623		0.5%
2010	4,317		−6.6%
2020	4,010		−7.1%
U.S. Decennial Census

=== Racial and ethnic composition ===
Parker racial composition (Hispanics excluded from racial categories) (NH = Non-Hispanic)
Race	Pop 2010	Pop 2020	% 2010	% 2020
White (NH)	3,259	2,767	75.49%	69.00%
Black or African American (NH)	523	517	12.11%	12.89%
Native American or Alaska Native (NH)	33	11	0.76%	0.27%
Asian (NH)	109	123	2.52%	3.07%
Pacific Islander or Native Hawaiian (NH)	1	0	0.02%	0.00%
Some other race (NH)	4	29	0.09%	0.72%
Two or more races/Multiracial (NH)	147	240	3.41%	5.99%
Hispanic or Latino (any race)	241	323	5.58%	8.05%
Total	4,317	4,010		

=== 2020 census ===
As of the 2020 census, Parker had a population of 4,010. The median age was 44.4 years. 18.7% of residents were under the age of 18 and 20.3% were 65 years of age or older. For every 100 females there were 95.9 males, and for every 100 females age 18 and over there were 94.1 males age 18 and over.

As of 2020, 100.0% of residents lived in urban areas, while 0.0% lived in rural areas.

In 2020, there were 1,660 households in Parker, of which 27.8% had children under the age of 18 living in them. Of all households, 41.0% were married-couple households, 20.8% were households with a male householder and no spouse or partner present, and 28.7% were households with a female householder and no spouse or partner present. About 26.4% of all households were made up of individuals and 11.0% had someone living alone who was 65 years of age or older.

In 2020, there were 2,074 housing units, of which 20.0% were vacant. The homeowner vacancy rate was 2.7% and the rental vacancy rate was 9.7%.

As of 2020, the American Community Survey estimated that there were 1,110 families residing in the city.

=== 2010 census ===
As of the 2010 United States census, there were 4,317 people, 2,012 households, and 1,140 families residing in the city.

In 2010, the population density was 2,272.1 inhabitants per square mile (877.3/km^{2}). There were 2,310 housing units at an average density of 1,215.8 per square mile (469.4/km^{2}).

In 2010, there were 1,861 households, 23.6% had children under the age of 18 living with them, 42.8% were headed by married couples living together, 14.5% had a female householder with no husband present, and 36.6% were non-families. 29.4% of households were made up of individuals, and 11.6% were someone living alone who was 65 or older. The average household size was 2.32, and the average family size was 2.82.

In 2010, the age distribution was 21.2% under the age of 18, 9.1% from 18 to 24, 24.3% from 25 to 44, 28.0% from 45 to 64, and 17.4% 65 or older. The median age was 40.9 years. For every 100 females, there were 94.8 males. For every 100 females age 18 and over, there were 91.6 males.

=== Income and poverty, 2000 census ===
As of the 2000 census, the median household income was $35,813, and the median family income was $43,929. Males had a median income of $28,455 versus $21,205 for females. The per capita income for the city was $18,660. About 10.1% of families and 12.2% of the population were below the poverty line, including 21.3% of those under age 18 and 4.6% of those age 65 or over.

== Education ==
Parker is home to Parker Elementary School, the city is part of the Bay District Schools district.

== Parks and recreation ==
The following parks are located within the city limits:

- Earl Gilbert Park
- Parker Sports Complex
- Parker Environmental Exploratorium and Boat Ramp
- Parker Memorial Park
- Under the Oaks Park
