= Springfield, Florida =

- City
- Seal
- Interactive map outlining Springfield
- Location within Florida Location within the United States
- Coordinates: 30°11′15″N 85°37′08″W
- Country: United States
- State: Florida
- County: Bay
- Incorporated: February 12, 1935

Government
  - Type: Mayor-Commission

Area
  - Total: 4.30 sq mi (11.13 km^{2})
  - Land: 4.18 sq mi (10.82 km^{2})
  - Water: 0.12 sq mi (0.31 km^{2})
- Elevation: 33 ft (10 m)

Population (2020)
  - Total: 8,075
  - Density: 1,932.9/sq mi (746.28/km^{2})
- Time zone: UTC-6 (Central (CST))
  - Summer (DST): UTC-5 (CDT)
- FIPS code: 12-68275
- GNIS feature ID: 2405513
- Website: www.springfieldfl.net

Springfield is a city in Bay County, Florida, United States, east of Panama City. It is part of the Panama City–Panama City Beach, Florida Metropolitan Statistical Area. Springfield was incorporated on February 12, 1935. The population was 8,075 at the 2020 census, down from 8,903 at the 2010 census.

== Geography ==
According to the United States Census Bureau, the city has a total area of 4.6 square miles (11.8 km^{2}), of which 4.3 square miles (11.2 km^{2}) is land and 0.23 square miles (0.6 km^{2}) (4.88%) is water.

== Demographics ==
Historical population
Census	Pop.	Note	%±
1940	1,188		—
1950	1,084		−8.8%
1960	4,628		326.9%
1970	5,949		28.5%
1980	7,220		21.4%
1990	8,715		20.7%
2000	8,810		1.1%
2010	8,903		1.1%
2020	8,075		−9.3%
U.S. Decennial Census

=== Racial and ethnic composition ===
Springfield racial composition (Hispanics excluded from racial categories) (NH = Non-Hispanic)
Race	Pop 2010	Pop 2020	% 2010	% 2020
White (NH)	5,612	4,457	63.03%	55.20%
Black or African American (NH)	2,074	1,872	23.30%	23.18%
Native American or Alaska Native (NH)	59	26	0.66%	0.32%
Asian (NH)	332	312	3.73%	3.86%
Pacific Islander or Native Hawaiian (NH)	7	10	0.08%	0.12%
Some other race (NH)	12	24	0.13%	0.30%
Two or more races/Multiracial (NH)	289	525	3.25%	6.50%
Hispanic or Latino (any race)	518	849	5.82%	10.51%
Total	8,903	8,075		

=== 2020 census ===
As of the 2020 census, Springfield had a population of 8,075. The median age was 37.1 years. 22.9% of residents were under the age of 18 and 14.8% were 65 years of age or older. For every 100 females, there were 98.5 males, and for every 100 females age 18 and over, there were 95.7 males.

99.8% of residents lived in urban areas, while 0.2% lived in rural areas.

There were 3,039 households, of which 32.8% had children under the age of 18 living in them. Of all households, 36.5% were married-couple households, 21.2% were households with a male householder and no spouse or partner present, and 31.3% were households with a female householder and no spouse or partner present. About 25.8% of all households were made up of individuals, and 9.7% had someone living alone who was 65 years of age or older.

There were 3,766 housing units, of which 19.3% were vacant. The homeowner vacancy rate was 3.6% and the rental vacancy rate was 14.3%.

=== Demographic estimates ===
In the 2020 ACS 5-year estimates, there were 2,474 families residing in the city.

=== 2010 census ===
As of the 2010 United States census, there were 8,903 people residing in the city.

In 2010, the population density was 2,070.5 inhabitants per square mile (794.9/km^{2}). There were 4,238 housing units at an average density of 985.6 per square mile (380.5/km^{2}).

In 2010, there were 3,478 households, 27.9% had children under the age of 18 living with them, 37.8% were headed by married couples living together, 19.6% had a female householder with no husband present, and 36.5% were non-families. 28.8% of households were made up of individuals, and 8.9% were someone living alone who was 65 or older. The average household size was 2.52, and the average family size was 3.07.

In 2010, the age distribution was 24.6% under the age of 18, 11.2% from 18 to 24, 26.5% from 25 to 44, 24.6% from 45 to 64, and 13.0% 65 or older. The median age was 34.9 years. For every 100 females, there were 97.5 males. For every 100 females age 18 and over, there were 96.7 males.

In 2010, the median household income was $36,693. The per capita income for the city was $18,001. About 15.3% of families and 21.5% of the population were below the poverty line, including 29.7% of those under age 18 and 15.1% of those age 65 or over.

=== 2000 census ===
As of the census of 2000 there are 8,810 people, 3,427 households, and 2,350 families residing in the city. The population density is 859.0/km^{2} (2,223.6/mi^{2}). There are 3,946 housing units at an average density of 384.7/km^{2} (996.0/mi^{2}). The racial makeup of the city is 67.43% White, 23.34% African American, 0.85% Native American, 4.26% Asian, 0.12% Pacific Islander, 0.96% from other races, and 3.03% from two or more races. 2.55% of the population are Hispanic or Latino of any race.

In 2000 there are 3,427 households out of which 33.6% have children under the age of 18 living with them, 45.1% are married couples living together, 18.1% have a female householder with no husband present, and 31.4% are non-families. 25.9% of all households are made up of individuals and 8.1% have someone living alone who is 65 years of age or older. The average household size is 2.56 and the average family size is 3.05.

In 2000, in the city the age distribution is 28.4% under the age of 18, 10.0% from 18 to 24, 29.0% from 25 to 44, 21.2% from 45 to 64, and 11.4% who are 65 years of age or older. The median age is 33 years. For every 100 females there are 91.6 males. For every 100 females age 18 and over, there are 88.1 males.

In 2000 the median income for a household in the city is $27,844, and the median income for a family is $34,665. Males have a median income of $25,417 versus $19,916 for females. The per capita income for the city is $12,689. 21.5% of the population and 15.3% of families are below the poverty line. Out of the total people living in poverty, 29.7% are under the age of 18 and 15.1% are 65 or older.

== Education ==
Springfield was home to Rutherford High School, Everitt Middle School, Springfield Elementary School, and Shaw Adult Learning Center. After Hurricane Michael Springfield Elementary School shut down. The building that once was Springfield Elementary School is now The Bay District School's Safety & Security Operations Center. Everitt Middle School's former building is currently in the process of being demolished and its students now share a building with Rutherford High School due to hurricane damage. Shaw Adult Learning Center was shut down in 2004. The city is part of the Bay District Schools district.
