= Callaway, Florida =

- City
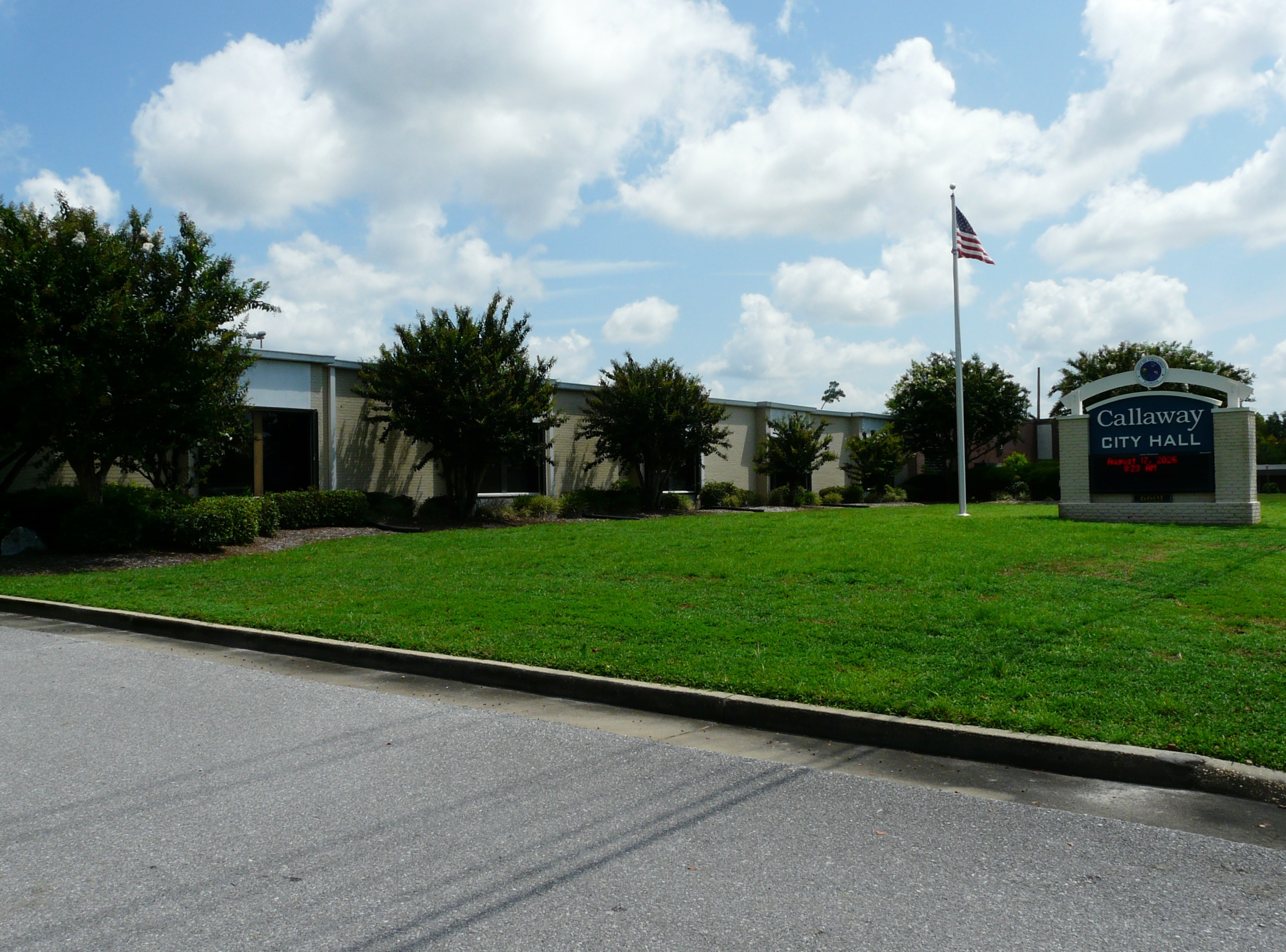
- Callaway City Hall

- Seal

- Location in Bay County and the state of Florida
- Coordinates: 30°07′32″N 85°32′30″W
- Country: United States
- State: Florida
- County: Bay

Area
  - Total: 9.54 sq mi (24.71 km^{2})
  - Land: 9.42 sq mi (24.40 km^{2})
  - Water: 0.12 sq mi (0.31 km^{2})
- Elevation: 30 ft (9.1 m)

Population (2020)
  - Total: 13,045
  - Density: 1,384.6/sq mi (534.61/km^{2})
- Time zone: UTC-6 (Central (CST))
  - Summer (DST): UTC-5 (CDT)
- ZIP code: 32404
- Area code: 850
- FIPS code: 12-09725
- GNIS feature ID: 2403971
- Website: www.cityofcallaway.com

Callaway is a city in Bay County, Florida, United States, and is a suburb of Panama City. The population was 13,045 at the 2020 census, down from 14,405 at the 2010 census. It is part of the Panama City–Panama City Beach, Florida Metropolitan Statistical Area.

== Geography ==
According to the United States Census Bureau, the city has a total area of 9.6 square miles (24.8 km^{2}), of which 9.0 square miles (23.3 km^{2}) is land and 0.58 square miles (1.5 km^{2}) (5.94%) is water.

== Demographics ==
Historical population
Census	Pop.	Note	%±
1960	950		—
1970	3,240		241.1%
1980	7,154		120.8%
1990	12,253		71.3%
2000	14,233		16.2%
2010	14,405		1.2%
2020	13,045		−9.4%
U.S. Decennial Census

=== Racial and ethnic composition ===
Callaway racial composition (Hispanics excluded from racial categories) (NH = Non-Hispanic)
Race	Pop 2010	Pop 2020	% 2010	% 2020
White (NH)	9,730	7,948	67.55%	60.93%
Black or African American (NH)	2,563	2,274	17.79%	17.43%
Native American or Alaska Native (NH)	82	48	0.57%	0.37%
Asian (NH)	584	522	4.05%	4.00%
Pacific Islander or Native Hawaiian (NH)	11	29	0.08%	0.22%
Some other race (NH)	27	89	0.19%	0.68%
Two or more races/Multiracial (NH)	559	860	3.88%	6.59%
Hispanic or Latino (any race)	849	1,275	5.89%	9.77%
Total	14,405	13,045		

=== 2020 census ===
As of the 2020 census, Callaway had a population of 13,045. The median age was 39.2 years. 22.1% of residents were under the age of 18 and 16.7% of residents were 65 years of age or older. For every 100 females there were 97.8 males, and for every 100 females age 18 and over there were 95.8 males age 18 and over.

97.2% of residents lived in urban areas, while 2.8% lived in rural areas.

There were 5,021 households in Callaway, of which 31.4% had children under the age of 18 living in them. Of all households, 45.3% were married-couple households, 20.5% were households with a male householder and no spouse or partner present, and 25.9% were households with a female householder and no spouse or partner present. About 24.9% of all households were made up of individuals and 8.7% had someone living alone who was 65 years of age or older.

There were 6,199 housing units, of which 19.0% were vacant. The homeowner vacancy rate was 4.0% and the rental vacancy rate was 17.5%.

=== 2020 ACS estimate ===
A 2020 American Community Survey 5-year estimate reported 3,727 families residing in the city.

=== 2010 census ===
As of the 2010 United States census, there were 14,405 people, 5,861 households, and 4,069 families residing in the city.

=== 2000 census ===
As of the census of 2000, there are 14,233 people, 5,541 households, and 4,006 families residing in the city. The population density is 965.8/km^{2} (2,501/mi^{2}). There are 6,167 housing units at an average density of 418.5/km^{2} (1,084/mi^{2}). The racial makeup of the city is 75.66% White, 15.82% African American, 0.84% Native American, 3.36% Asian, 0.08% Pacific Islander, 1.19% from other races, and 3.05% from two or more races. 3.58% of the population are Hispanic or Latino of any race.

Of the 5,541 households in 2000, 36.6% had children under the age of 18 living with them, 54.6% were married couples living together, 13.4% had a female householder with no husband present, and 27.7% were non-families. 22.1% of households were one person and 4.8% were one person aged 65 or older. The average household size was 2.57 and the average family size was 3.00.

In 2000, the age distribution was 27.3% under the age of 18, 9.9% from 18 to 24, 31.6% from 25 to 44, 22.7% from 45 to 64, and 8.5% 65 or older. The median age was 34 years. For every 100 females, there were 99.8 males. For every 100 females age 18 and over, there were 96.1 males.

In 2000, the median household income was $36,064 and the median family income was $41,509. Males had a median income of $27,773 versus $20,324 for females. The per capita income for the city was $16,102. About 10.3% of families and 11.6% of the population were below the poverty line, including 18.2% of those under age 18 and 7.7% of those age 65 or over.
