= Cedar Grove, Florida =

- Census-designated place
- Location in Bay County and the state of Florida
- Coordinates: 30°10′49″N 85°37′24″W
- Country: United States
- State: Florida
- County: Bay
- Incorporated: 1951
- Disincorporated: 2008

Government
  - Mayor: None

Area
  - Total: 2.64 sq mi (6.83 km^{2})
  - Land: 2.63 sq mi (6.81 km^{2})
  - Water: 0.0039 sq mi (0.01 km^{2})
- Elevation: 39 ft (12 m)

Population (2020)
  - Total: 3,148
  - Density: 1,196.5/sq mi (461.98/km^{2})
- Time zone: UTC-6 (Central (CST))
  - Summer (DST): UTC-5 (CDT)
- FIPS code: 12-11150
- GNIS feature ID: 2630664

Cedar Grove is an unincorporated area and census-designated place in Bay County, Florida, United States. It was formerly an incorporated town, but it was dissolved in 2008 after a vote by residents. The town had 90 days from October 3, 2008, to implement the dissolution ordinance and hand over all operations to organs of the county government. This was the first time in Florida history that a town was disincorporated by a vote of its citizens. The dissolution ordinance took effect at 8:00 AM on October 22, 2008, at which time the police department was disbanded and all assets became the property of the Bay County Commission. The current census-designated place had a population of 3,148 at the 2020 census, down from 3,397 at the 2010 census. It is part of the Panama City–Panama City Beach, Florida Metropolitan Statistical Area.

== Geography ==
According to the United States Census Bureau, the census-designated place has a total area of 2.7 square miles (7.0 km^{2}), all land.

== Demographics ==
Historical population
Census	Pop.	Note	%±
1960	676		—
1970	689		1.9%
1980	1,104		60.2%
1990	1,479		34.0%
2000	5,367		262.9%
2010	3,397		−36.7%
2020	3,148		−7.3%
U.S. Decennial Census

After disincorporation, the community was listed as a census designated place in the 2010 U.S. census.

=== Racial and ethnic composition ===
Cedar Grove CDP, Florida – Racial and ethnic composition Note: the US Census treats Hispanic/Latino as an ethnic category. This table excludes Latinos from the racial categories and assigns them to a separate category. Hispanics/Latinos may be of any race.
Race / Ethnicity (NH = Non-Hispanic)	Pop 2000	Pop 2010	Pop 2020	% 2000	% 2010	% 2020
White alone (NH)	4,511	2,260	1,589	84.05%	66.53%	50.48%
Black or African American alone (NH)	513	725	873	9.56%	21.34%	27.73%
Native American or Alaska Native alone (NH)	35	24	20	0.65%	0.71%	0.64%
Asian alone (NH)	94	60	51	1.75%	1.77%	1.62%
Native Hawaiian or Pacific Islander alone (NH)	5	2	7	0.09%	0.06%	0.22%
Other race alone (NH)	6	9	13	0.11%	0.26%	0.41%
Mixed race or Multiracial (NH)	90	112	186	1.68%	3.30%	5.91%
Hispanic or Latino (any race)	113	205	409	2.11%	6.03%	12.99%
Total	5,367	3,397	3,148	100.00%	100.00%	100.00%

=== 2020 census ===
As of the 2020 census, Cedar Grove had a population of 3,148. The median age was 34.8 years. 28.6% of residents were under the age of 18 and 11.9% of residents were 65 years of age or older. For every 100 females there were 98.6 males, and for every 100 females age 18 and over there were 91.8 males age 18 and over.

100.0% of residents lived in urban areas, while 0.0% lived in rural areas.

There were 1,103 households in Cedar Grove, of which 34.8% had children under the age of 18 living in them. Of all households, 36.0% were married-couple households, 21.9% were households with a male householder and no spouse or partner present, and 32.5% were households with a female householder and no spouse or partner present. About 26.6% of all households were made up of individuals and 9.9% had someone living alone who was 65 years of age or older.

There were 1,324 housing units, of which 16.7% were vacant. The homeowner vacancy rate was 2.6% and the rental vacancy rate was 10.3%.

Racial composition as of the 2020 census
Race	Number	Percent
White	1,659	52.7%
Black or African American	883	28.0%
American Indian and Alaska Native	34	1.1%
Asian	52	1.7%
Native Hawaiian and Other Pacific Islander	7	0.2%
Some other race	188	6.0%
Two or more races	325	10.3%

=== 2000 census ===
As of the census of 2000, there were 5,367 people, 2,109 households, and 1,423 families residing in the town. The population density was 572.5 inhabitants per square mile (221.0/km^{2}). There were 2,341 housing units at an average density of 249.7 per square mile (96.4/km^{2}). The racial makeup of the town was 85.47% White, 9.60% African American, 0.73% Native American, 1.77% Asian, 0.09% Pacific Islander, 0.56% from other races, and 1.79% from two or more races. Hispanic or Latino of any race were 2.11% of the population.

There were 2,109 households, out of which 34.6% had children under the age of 18 living with them, 46.7% were married couples living together, 16.2% had a female householder with no husband present, and 32.5% were non-families. 26.4% of all households were made up of individuals, and 7.4% had someone living alone who was 65 years of age or older. The average household size was 2.49 and the average family size was 3.00.

In the town the population was spread out, with 27.2% under the age of 18, 9.9% from 18 to 24, 29.4% from 25 to 44, 20.7% from 45 to 64, and 12.9% who were 65 years of age or older. The median age was 34 years. For every 100 females, there were 92.4 males. For every 100 females age 18 and over, there were 87.3 males.

The median income for a household in the town was $28,762, and the median income for a family was $31,577. Males had a median income of $25,203 versus $18,250 for females. The per capita income for the town was $13,588. About 16.1% of families and 19.0% of the population were below the poverty line, including 29.8% of those under age 18 and 7.1% of those age 65 or over.
