= Lynn Haven, Florida =

- City
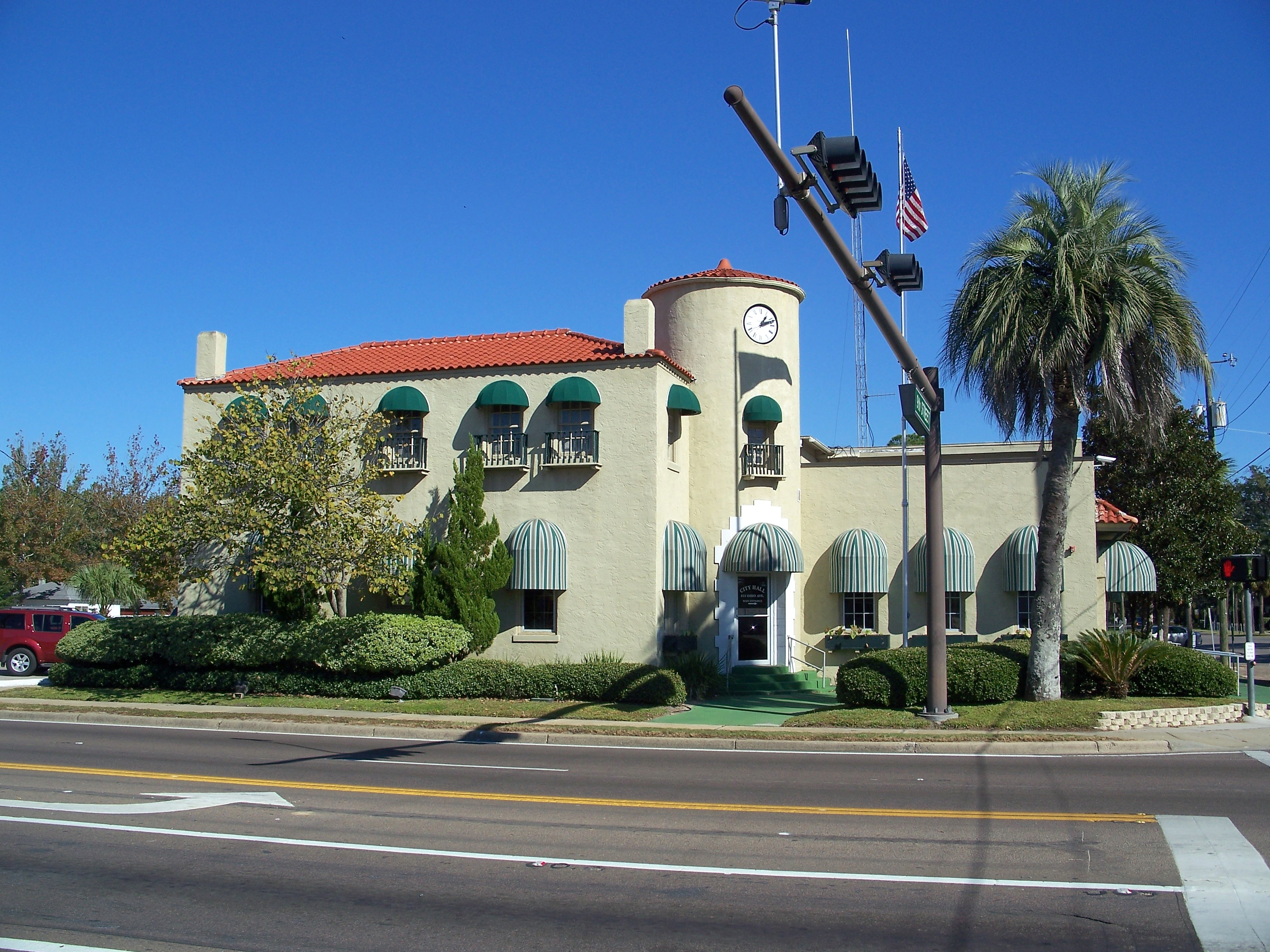
- City Hall as seen from Florida State Road 77

- Seal
- Interactive map of Lynn Haven, Florida
- Coordinates: 30°14′42″N 85°36′05″W
- Country: United States
- State: Florida
- County: Bay
- Incorporated (town): July 1, 1914
- Incorporated (city): 1927

Area
  - Total: 10.53 sq mi (27.27 km^{2})
  - Land: 10.45 sq mi (27.07 km^{2})
  - Water: 0.073 sq mi (0.19 km^{2})
- Elevation: 20 ft (6.1 m)

Population (2020)
  - Total: 18,695
  - Density: 1,788.6/sq mi (690.57/km^{2})
- Time zone: UTC-6 (Central (CST))
  - Summer (DST): UTC-5 (CDT)
- ZIP code: 32444
- Area code: 850
- FIPS code: 12-41825
- GNIS feature ID: 2404981
- Website: www.cityoflynnhaven.gov

Lynn Haven is a city in Bay County, Florida, United States, north of Panama City. The population was 18,695 at the 2020 census, up from 18,493 at the 2010 census. It is part of the Panama City, Florida metropolitan area.

== History ==
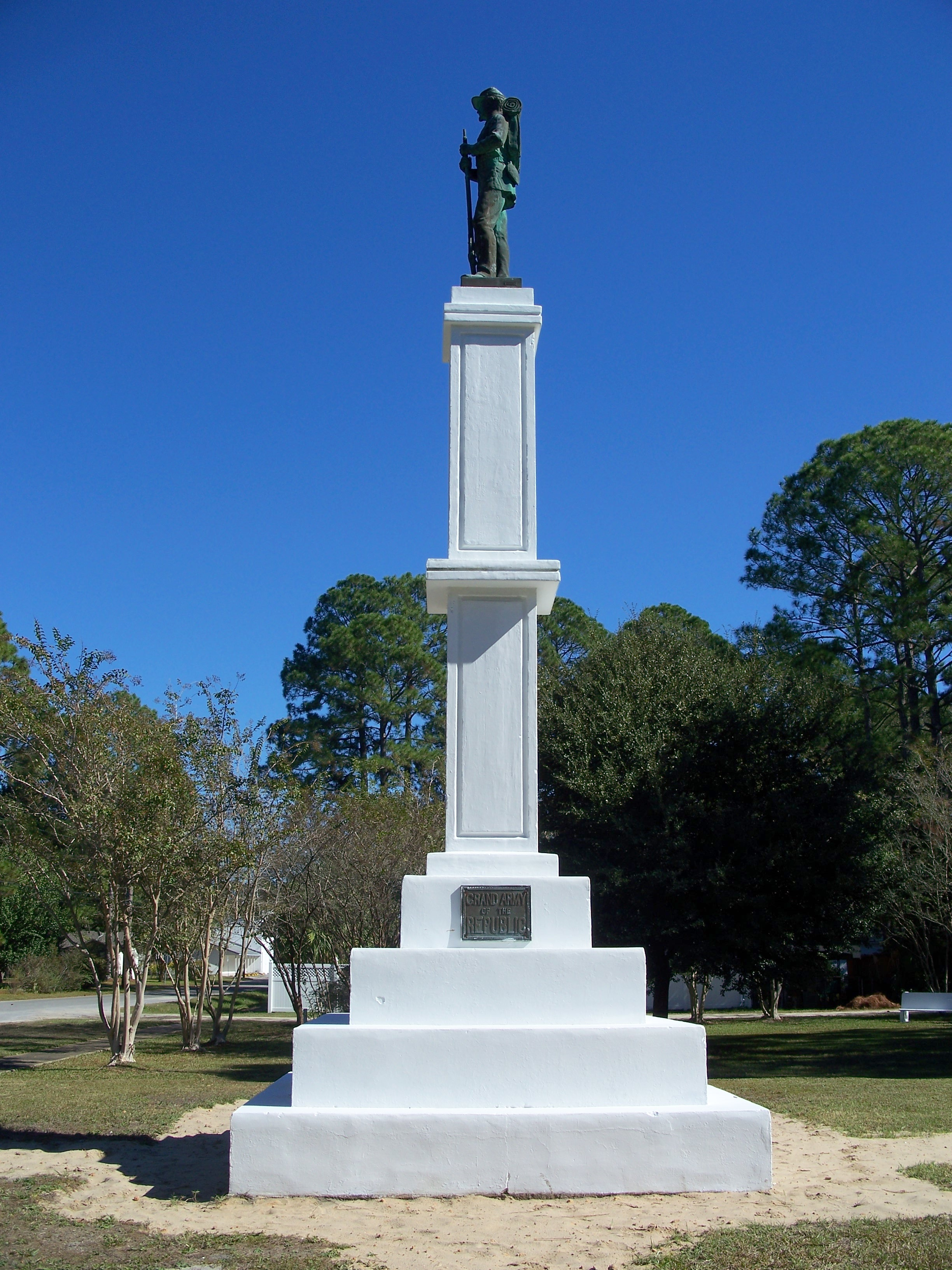
Union soldier monument

Lynn Haven was founded in 1911 by Union veterans from the American Civil War. The town was named after W. H. Lynn, a primary stockholder of the St. Andrews Bay Development Company, the corporation that owned and developed the land on which Lynn Haven grew.

On October 10, 2018, Hurricane Michael made landfall near Lynn Haven. The 3rd strongest hurricane to ever make landfall in the contiguous United States was the first category 5 hurricane to strike the United States since Hurricane Andrew in 1992. Hurricane Michael displaced thousands of Lynn Haven residents.

After Hurricane Michael, the FBI initiated a federal investigation into city corruption, which resulted in the suspension of Mayor Margo Anderson by Governor Ron DeSantis. She resigned from her position and was later arrested at her home in Jacksonville, Florida. Prosecutors charged Anderson with 64 counts for her involvement in hurricane debris removal scheme resulting in the theft of $5 million. Anderson entered a plea agreement and charged with one felony of lying to the FBI. She served one month in prison. Several other city officials were charged and pleaded guilty, including former City Manager Michael White and former City Attorney Adam Albritton. Additionally, local businessman James Finch, owner of Phoenix Construction, was charged with bribing former City Commissioner Antonius Barnes with $45,000 in checks over several years. Finch has a history of being associated with corruption in previous cases. Barnes took a plea deal in the case, but did not testify in the second trial, which subsequently led to a not guilty verdict for Finch.

During a special election, Jesse L. Nelson, a local pastor of Macedonia Missionary Baptist Church, was elected Mayor on May 18, 2021, by a slim margin. He is the first African-American mayor to be elected to the position.

== Geography ==
Lynn Haven is located north of Panama City along Florida State Road 77, which is the main route through the city. FL-77 leads north 41 mi (66 km) to Chipley along Interstate 10 and south 6 mi (10 km) to the center of Panama City.

According to the United States Census Bureau, the city has a total area of 11.8 square miles (30.5 km^{2}), of which 10.4 square miles (26.9 km^{2}) is land, and 1.4 square miles (3.6 km^{2}) (11.90%) is water.

== Demographics ==
Historical population
Census	Pop.	Note	%±
1920	874		—
1930	928		6.2%
1940	1,246		34.3%
1950	1,787		43.4%
1960	3,078		72.2%
1970	4,044		31.4%
1980	6,239		54.3%
1990	9,298		49.0%
2000	12,451		33.9%
2010	18,493		48.5%
2020	18,695		1.1%
U.S. Decennial Census

=== Racial and ethnic composition ===
Lynn Haven racial composition (Hispanics excluded from racial categories) (NH = Non-Hispanic)
Race	Pop 2010	Pop 2020	% 2010	% 2020
White (NH)	14,891	13,760	80.52%	73.60%
Black or African American (NH)	1,831	1,766	9.90%	9.45%
Native American or Alaska Native (NH)	90	69	0.49%	0.37%
Asian (NH)	433	622	2.34%	3.33%
Pacific Islander or Native Hawaiian (NH)	21	24	0.11%	0.13%
Some other race (NH)	15	44	0.08%	0.24%
Two or more races/Multiracial (NH)	453	1,071	2.45%	5.73%
Hispanic or Latino (any race)	759	1,339	4.10%	7.16%
Total	18,493	18,695		

=== 2020 census ===
As of the 2020 census, Lynn Haven had a population of 18,695. The median age was 39.3 years. 23.5% of residents were under the age of 18 and 16.3% of residents were 65 years of age or older. For every 100 females there were 90.8 males, and for every 100 females age 18 and over there were 88.7 males age 18 and over.

99.6% of residents lived in urban areas, while 0.4% lived in rural areas.

There were 7,333 households in Lynn Haven, of which 34.8% had children under the age of 18 living in them. Of all households, 51.3% were married-couple households, 15.2% were households with a male householder and no spouse or partner present, and 27.1% were households with a female householder and no spouse or partner present. About 24.0% of all households were made up of individuals and 9.7% had someone living alone who was 65 years of age or older.

There were 8,668 housing units, of which 15.4% were vacant. The homeowner vacancy rate was 3.4% and the rental vacancy rate was 14.1%.

Racial composition as of the 2020 census
Race	Number	Percent
White	14,058	75.2%
Black or African American	1,818	9.7%
American Indian and Alaska Native	84	0.4%
Asian	630	3.4%
Native Hawaiian and Other Pacific Islander	24	0.1%
Some other race	382	2.0%
Two or more races	1,699	9.1%
Hispanic or Latino (of any race)	1,339	7.2%

=== Other 2020 estimates ===
In 2020, there were 5,715 families residing in the city.

In 2020, there were 2,136 veterans living in the city. 3.4% of the population were foreign born persons.

In 2020, 97.1% of households had a computer and 93.5% had a broadband internet subscription. 94.8% of those 25 years and older had a graduated high school or higher and 28.7% of that same population had a bachelor's degree or higher.

In 2020, the median household income was $68,406 and the income per capita was $28,826. 10.5% of the population lived below the poverty threshold. The median gross rent was $1,274 and the median value of owner-occupied housing units was $214,800.

=== 2010 census ===
As of the 2010 United States census, there were 18,493 people, 7,169 households, and 4,796 families residing in the city.

== Education ==
Lynn Haven is served by Bay District Schools.

There are six public schools:

- Deer Point Elementary School
- Lynn Haven Elementary School
- Mowat Middle School
- A. Crawford Mosley High School
- Tom P Haney Technical College
- New Horizon School

There are two charter schools:

- Bay Haven Charter School
- North Bay Haven Charter School

== Historic areas ==
Historic areas and buildings in Lynn Haven include:

- Bailey Bridge, built in 1946 to replace the wooden pier that spanned North Bay from Lynn Haven to Southport
- City Hall, built in 1928
- First Presbyterian Church, built in 1911
- McMullin Library, built in 1911
- Monument Park
- Panama Country Club Golf Course, developed in 1927
- Roberts Hall, built in 1912

== Library ==
Lynn Haven Public Library, Bay County's first library, was established in the city of Lynn Haven in 1911 when a group of fourteen ladies donated a book and three magazines. Without a true library, they met in various homes and other local buildings as the Lynn Haven Literary Club. By 1915, the collection grew to 500 volumes. In 1922, the McMullin family donated a building and $1,000 and library became known as the McMullin Library. The Literary Club began a weekly story-telling hour on Saturdays for children under the age of twelve.

In 1925, the Literary Club joined the Federation of Women's Club, continuing their sponsorship of the McMullin Library. The Lynn Haven Women's Club provided building maintenance and expense, made several improvements, and purchased many books.

In 1961, the McMullin Library joined the Northwest Regional Library System. During this time, the city was flourishing and required a larger, more modern building. The building was moved to make room for the widening of Ohio Avenue and was moved three more times before finding a permanent home on Georgia Avenue. In 2017, the Heritage Society of Lynn Haven and the Independent Order of Odd Fellows began a $110,000 renovation project to restore the building.

In 1970, the new North Bay Branch Library was constructed. In the middle of the 1980s, the library underwent a major expansion to improve service and create room for over 11,000 volumes. A fund drive was held, along with funds matched by a grant from the State of Florida allowed for the building addition. The grand opening happened at the end of 1988.

In 1990, the City of Lynn Haven took charge of the library's financial responsibilities and the name was changed to the Lynn Haven Public Library.

Hurricane Michael, a category 5 storm, damaged the library in 2018. The building was removed in March 2021. City leaders may use the $1.9 million in insurance money to build a new library in a different location. Plans for a new library were unveiled in January 2022, but no decision has been made as of November 2023.
