= 1924 United States presidential election in Illinois =

- November 4, 1924

All 29 Illinois votes to the Electoral College

Nominee	Calvin Coolidge	John W. Davis	Robert M. La Follette
Party	Republican	Democratic	Progressive
Home state	Massachusetts	West Virginia	Wisconsin
Running mate	Charles G. Dawes	Charles W. Bryan	Burton K. Wheeler
Electoral vote	29	0	0
Popular vote	1,453,321	576,975	432,027
Percentage	58.84%	23.36%	17.49%
County results
Coolidge
30–40%
40–50%
50–60%
60–70%
70–80%
Davis
40–50%
50–60%
La Follette
40–50%
President before election
Calvin Coolidge
Republican
Elected President
Calvin Coolidge
Republican

The 1924 United States presidential election in Illinois took place on November 4, 1924, as part of the 1924 United States presidential election. State voters chose 29 representatives, or electors, to the Electoral College, who voted for president and vice president.

A strongly Democratic state during the Second Party System, Illinois became Republican-leaning after the American Civil War due to a combination of strong Free Soil Party heritage amongst its Yankee northern counties with the wartime conversion of some Virginian-settled rock-ribbed Democratic Southern Illinois counties to Unionist Republicanism à la Appalachia. Between the Civil War and World War I, partisanship in Illinois – like in the Border States – largely re-fought the war, with the result that although the Democratic Party gained at least 43 percent of the statewide vote via Southern and German Catholic support in every election up to 1900, they never gained an absolute majority and carried the state's electoral votes only in 1892.

Due to the Democratic Party's growing Populist and prohibitionist leanings, a decline in Democratic support after 1900 in its German Central Illinois strongholds transformed Illinois into a powerfully Republican state at all levels. Even Woodrow Wilson in 1912 when the GOP was mortally divided carried the state by only a very narrow margin, and in 1920 hostility to the League of Nations and the perceived anti-German bias of both outgoing President Wilson and new Democratic nominee and former Ohio Governor James M. Cox – the latter of whom had banned German-language instruction in Ohio schools – meant Harding carried Illinois by over 42 percentage points and the state was his sixth strongest in a national landslide. German Catholic Clinton County, and twelve southern-settled counties in the Illinois River valley and southward, went Republican for the first time.

During the Republican National Convention, Illinosian Charles G. Dawes easily won the Vice-Presidential nomination ahead of fellow state resident Frank Lowden. The first campaign in Illinois was not by Coolidge or Davis, but by radical third-party nominee, veteran Wisconsin Senator Robert M. La Follette, who on July 4 confirmed his previous plan to run a third-party campaign when nominated by the "Conference for Progressive Political Action". La Follette on Labor Day, August 22, said he hoped to carry Illinois because he believed gubernatorial candidate Len Small would not aid the Coolidge ticket. Democratic nominee John W. Davis, a conservative Southern Democrat from West Virginia, spent four days in Chicago conferring with party leaders from half-a-dozen other states, but did not campaign downstate. Coolidge was urged to campaign in the state after suspicions La Follette would be a severe threat in Chicago and other German-American communities. Coolidge did not respond, and Dawes was viciously criticised by La Follette's running mate, Montana Senator Burton K. Wheeler, for being associated with the Central Trust Company and Lorimer Street State Savings Bank.

At the beginning of the campaign it was considered possible that Davis could carry Illinois if there was a strong enough vote for La Follette. However, as early as mid-August it was thought that the Coolidge-Dawes ticket was certain of carrying Illinois, and in mid-September it seemed likely Coolidge was a clear first with La Follette running ahead of Davis, a result that would be repeated in a survey during the second week of October.

== Primaries ==
The primaries and general elections coincided with those for other federal offices (Senate and House), as well as those for state offices.

=== Turnout ===
The total vote in the state-run primary elections (Democratic and Republican) was 1,101,583.

The total vote in the general election was 2,470,067. Both major parties held non-binding state-run preferential primaries on April 8.

=== Democratic ===
1924 Illinois Democratic presidential primary
- April 8, 1924
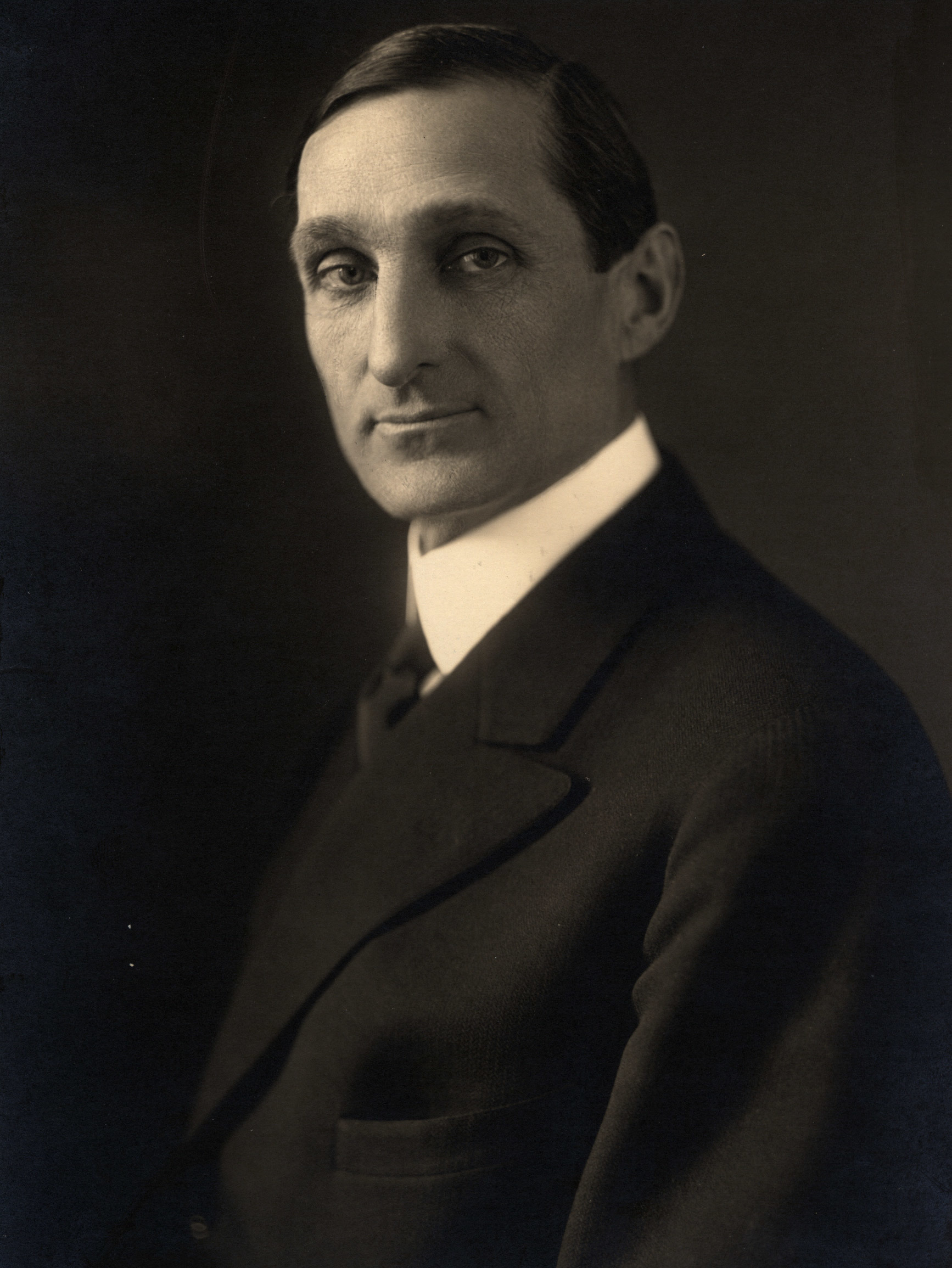
Candidate	William Gibbs McAdoo
Home state	California
Popular vote	180,544
Percentage	98.93%

The 1924 Illinois Democratic presidential primary was held on April 8, 1924, in the U.S. state of Illinois as one of the Democratic Party's state primaries ahead of the 1924 presidential election.

The preference vote was a non-binding "beauty contest". Delegates were instead elected by direct votes by congressional district on delegate candidates. Delegate candidates either were listed on the ballot with their preference on for a particular presidential candidate, or were listed as expressing no preference.

The preference vote was near-unanimously won by the only name on the ballot, former United States Secretary of the Treasury William Gibbs McAdoo.

1924 Illinois Democratic presidential primary
Candidate	Votes	%
William Gibbs McAdoo	180,544	98.93
William E. Dever (write-in)	1,574	0.86
Al Smith (write-in)	235	0.13
James Reed (write-in)	84	0.05
Scattering	66	0.04
Total	182,503	100

=== Republican ===
1924 Illinois Republican presidential primary
- April 8, 1924
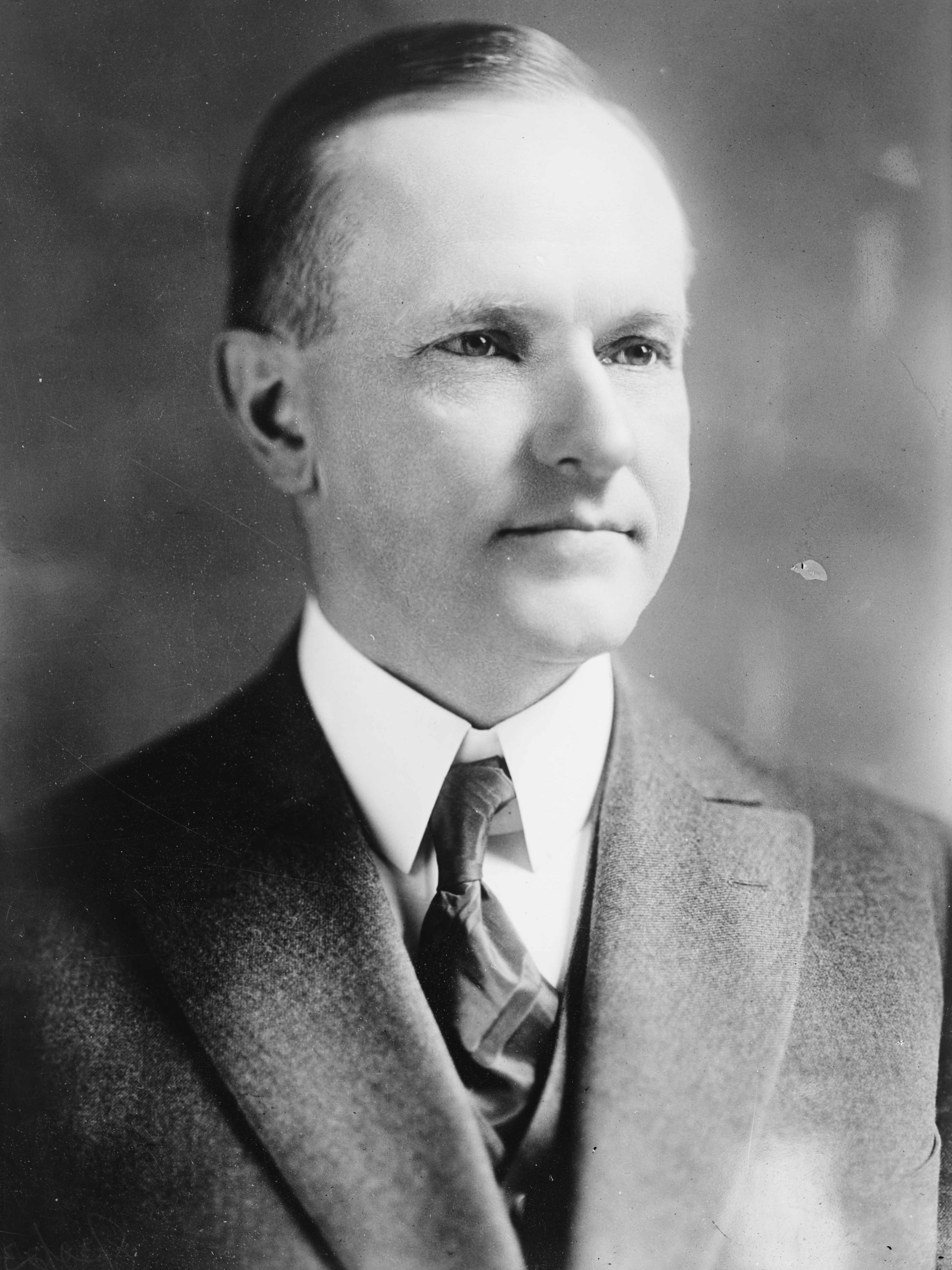

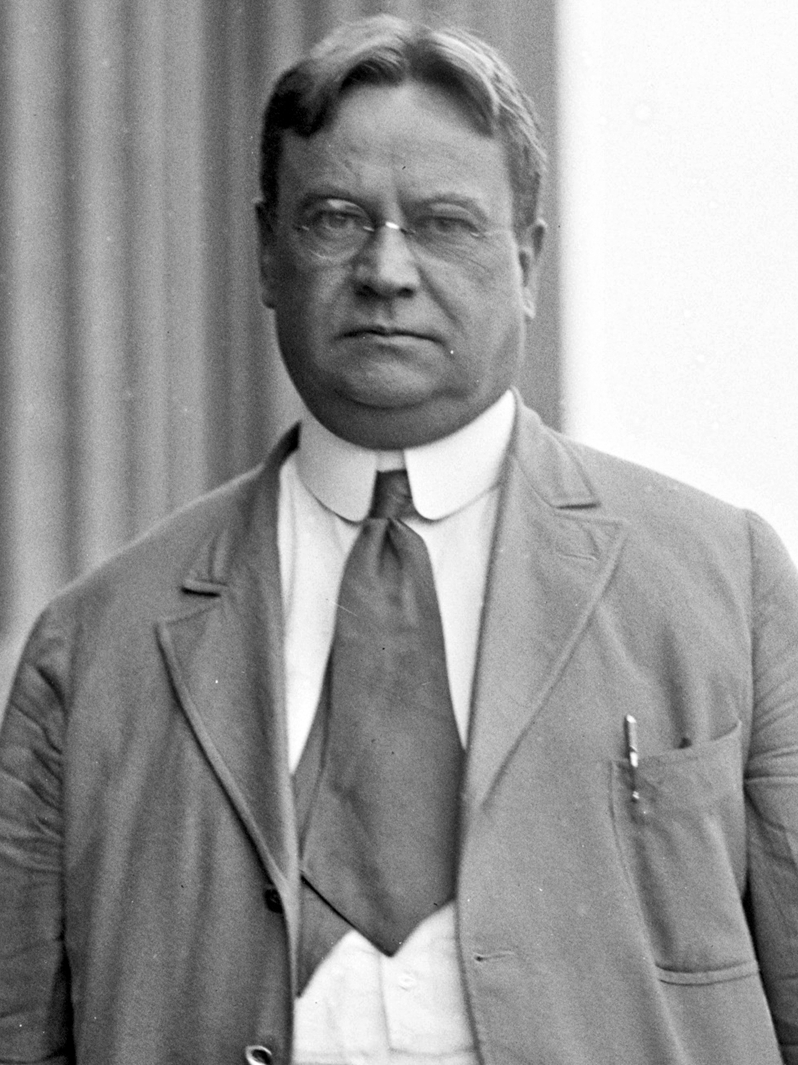
Candidate	Calvin Coolidge	Hiram Johnson
Home state	Massachusetts	California
Popular vote	533,193	385,590
Percentage	58.01%	41.95%

The 1924 Illinois Republican presidential primary was held on April 8, 1924, in the U.S. state of Illinois as one of the Republican Party's state primaries ahead of the 1924 presidential election.

The preference vote was a "beauty contest". Delegates were instead selected by direct vote in each congressional district on delegate candidates. Delegate candidates either were listed on the ballot with their preference on for a particular presidential candidate, or were listed as expressing no preference.

1924 Illinois Republican presidential primary
Candidate	Votes	%
Calvin Coolidge (incumbent)	533,193	58.01
Hiram W. Johnson	385,590	41.95
Robert La Follette (write-in)	278	0.03
Scattering	21	0.00
Total	919,082	100

== Results ==
Presidential Candidate	Running Mate	Party	Electoral Vote (EV)	Popular Vote (PV)	
Calvin Coolidge of Massachusetts (incumbent)	Charles G. Dawes	Republican	29	1,453,321	58.84%
John W. Davis	Charles W. Bryan	Democratic	0	576,975	23.36%
Robert M. La Follette	Burton K. Wheeler	Progressive	0	432,027	17.49%
William Z. Foster	Benjamin Gitlow	Workers' Party America	0	2,622	0.11%
Herman P. Faris	Marie C. Brehm	Prohibition	0	2,367	0.10%
Frank T. Johns	Verne L. Reynolds	Socialist Labor	0	2,334	0.09%
William Wallace	John C. Lincoln	Commonwealth Land	0	421	0.02%

=== Results by county ===
County	John Calvin Coolidge Republican		John William Davis Democratic		Robert Marion La Follette Sr. Progressive		Various candidates Other parties		Margin		Total votes cast
County	#	%	#	%	#	%	#	%	#	%	Total votes cast
Adams	9,985	40.92%	8,628	35.35%	5,693	23.33%	98	0.40%	1,357	5.56%	24,404
Alexander	4,465	58.10%	2,639	34.34%	573	7.46%	8	0.10%	1,826	23.76%	7,685
Bond	3,644	56.88%	2,143	33.45%	585	9.13%	35	0.55%	1,501	23.43%	6,407
Boone	4,872	75.37%	348	5.38%	1,235	19.11%	9	0.14%	3,637 (Note: In this county where La Follette ran second ahead of Davis, margin given is Coolidge vote minus La Follette vote and percentage margin Coolidge percentage minus La Follette percentage.)	56.27%	6,464
Brown	1,637	41.49%	2,149	54.46%	139	3.52%	21	0.53%	-512	-12.98%	3,946
Bureau	9,457	60.38%	1,995	12.74%	4,169	26.62%	42	0.27%	5,288	33.76%	15,663
Calhoun	1,136	48.12%	1,115	47.23%	100	4.24%	10	0.42%	21	0.89%	2,361
Carroll	4,559	60.93%	603	8.06%	2,301	30.75%	19	0.25%	2,258	30.18%	7,482
Cass	3,139	41.23%	2,909	38.21%	1,547	20.32%	18	0.24%	230	3.02%	7,613
Champaign	14,244	62.81%	5,221	23.02%	3,149	13.89%	63	0.28%	9,023	39.79%	22,677
Christian	7,398	46.08%	5,826	36.29%	2,741	17.07%	91	0.57%	1,572	9.79%	16,056
Clark	4,731	51.55%	4,203	45.79%	211	2.30%	33	0.36%	528	5.75%	9,178
Clay	3,432	49.60%	2,987	43.17%	479	6.92%	21	0.30%	445	6.43%	6,919
Clinton	2,358	29.69%	1,693	21.32%	3,876	48.80%	15	0.19%	-1,518	-19.11%	7,942
Coles	8,342	54.90%	5,544	36.49%	1,275	8.39%	33	0.22%	2,798	18.42%	15,194
Cook	688,973	61.87%	226,141	20.31%	196,149	17.61%	2,389	0.21%	462,832	41.56%	1,113,652
Crawford	4,830	51.25%	4,223	44.81%	364	3.86%	8	0.08%	607	6.44%	9,425
Cumberland	2,698	51.09%	2,384	45.14%	190	3.60%	9	0.17%	314	5.95%	5,281
De Witt	5,173	58.77%	2,752	31.27%	846	9.61%	31	0.35%	2,421	27.51%	8,802
DeKalb	10,500	76.40%	1,540	11.20%	1,654	12.03%	50	0.36%	8,846	64.36%	13,744
Douglas	4,046	55.65%	2,315	31.84%	874	12.02%	35	0.48%	1,731	23.81%	7,270
DuPage	16,917	72.81%	1,893	8.15%	4,378	18.84%	45	0.19%	12,539	53.97%	23,233
Edgar	6,297	52.31%	5,222	43.38%	500	4.15%	18	0.15%	1,075	8.93%	12,037
Edwards	2,750	69.59%	1,047	26.49%	140	3.54%	15	0.38%	1,703	43.09%	3,952
Effingham	3,159	39.18%	3,814	47.30%	1,070	13.27%	20	0.25%	-655	-8.12%	8,063
Fayette	5,010	48.43%	4,668	45.13%	627	6.06%	39	0.38%	342	3.31%	10,344
Ford	4,672	70.53%	1,093	16.50%	849	12.82%	10	0.15%	3,579	54.03%	6,624
Franklin	6,779	39.59%	5,791	33.82%	4,304	25.14%	247	1.44%	988	5.77%	17,121
Fulton	8,664	48.35%	5,011	27.96%	4,150	23.16%	96	0.54%	3,653	20.38%	17,921
Gallatin	1,792	39.16%	2,385	52.12%	368	8.04%	31	0.68%	-593	-12.96%	4,576
Greene	3,527	39.73%	4,648	52.35%	687	7.74%	16	0.18%	-1,121	-12.63%	8,878
Grundy	4,337	63.97%	742	10.94%	1,681	24.79%	20	0.29%	2,656	39.17%	6,780
Hamilton	2,659	44.02%	3,168	52.44%	200	3.31%	14	0.23%	-509	-8.43%	6,041
Hancock	6,678	51.83%	5,189	40.27%	963	7.47%	55	0.43%	1,489	11.56%	12,885
Hardin	1,378	49.06%	1,358	48.34%	70	2.49%	3	0.11%	20	0.71%	2,809
Henderson	2,879	72.87%	803	20.32%	257	6.50%	12	0.30%	2,076	52.54%	3,951
Henry	13,159	72.39%	1,944	10.69%	3,027	16.65%	49	0.27%	10,132	55.73%	18,179
Iroquois	7,498	64.07%	2,303	19.68%	1,873	16.01%	28	0.24%	5,195	44.39%	11,702
Jackson	6,424	49.30%	4,707	36.12%	1,845	14.16%	54	0.41%	1,717	13.18%	13,030
Jasper	3,030	47.37%	3,144	49.15%	201	3.14%	22	0.34%	-114	-1.78%	6,397
Jefferson	5,406	44.57%	6,258	51.59%	436	3.59%	30	0.25%	-852	-7.02%	12,130
Jersey	2,460	44.44%	2,723	49.19%	335	6.05%	18	0.33%	-263	-4.75%	5,536
Jo Daviess	4,864	50.36%	1,477	15.29%	3,279	33.95%	39	0.40%	1,585	16.41%	9,659
Johnson	2,468	60.59%	1,408	34.57%	188	4.62%	9	0.22%	1,060	26.03%	4,073
Kane	32,717	76.34%	3,517	8.21%	6,517	15.21%	107	0.25%	26,200	61.13%	42,858
Kankakee	12,462	67.47%	2,488	13.47%	3,438	18.61%	83	0.45%	9,024	48.85%	18,471
Kendall	3,513	79.68%	432	9.80%	455	10.32%	9	0.20%	3,058	69.36%	4,409
Knox	12,968	65.89%	2,617	13.30%	4,044	20.55%	51	0.26%	8,924	45.35%	19,680
Lake	18,229	75.48%	2,008	8.31%	3,671	15.20%	242	1.00%	14,558	60.28%	24,150
LaSalle	21,417	60.47%	6,216	17.55%	7,686	21.70%	98	0.28%	13,731	38.77%	35,417
Lawrence	4,607	51.50%	4,103	45.87%	167	1.87%	68	0.76%	504	5.63%	8,945
Lee	8,363	69.36%	2,367	19.63%	1,289	10.69%	38	0.32%	5,996	49.73%	12,057
Livingston	9,695	64.53%	2,911	19.37%	2,387	15.89%	32	0.21%	6,784	45.15%	15,025
Logan	7,063	57.16%	3,708	30.01%	1,537	12.44%	48	0.39%	3,355	27.15%	12,356
Macon	16,458	60.22%	6,670	24.40%	4,120	15.07%	83	0.30%	9,788	35.81%	27,331
Macoupin	8,571	39.24%	6,134	28.08%	6,959	31.86%	177	0.81%	1,612	7.38%	21,841
Madison	19,926	47.61%	12,863	30.74%	8,965	21.42%	97	0.23%	7,063	16.88%	41,851
Marion	5,889	44.01%	4,768	35.63%	2,671	19.96%	53	0.40%	1,121	8.38%	13,381
Marshall	3,776	58.41%	1,836	28.40%	823	12.73%	30	0.46%	1,940	30.01%	6,465
Mason	3,522	52.72%	2,536	37.96%	604	9.04%	18	0.27%	986	14.76%	6,680
Massac	3,227	71.44%	920	20.37%	350	7.75%	20	0.44%	2,307	51.07%	4,517
McDonough	7,505	60.99%	4,016	32.63%	746	6.06%	39	0.32%	3,489	28.35%	12,306
McHenry	8,751	67.24%	1,372	10.54%	2,864	22.01%	28	0.22%	5,887	45.23%	13,015
McLean	16,550	55.95%	6,826	23.07%	6,132	20.73%	74	0.25%	9,724	32.87%	29,582
Menard	2,931	56.18%	1,954	37.45%	319	6.11%	13	0.25%	977	18.73%	5,217
Mercer	5,618	68.30%	1,699	20.66%	890	10.82%	18	0.22%	3,919	47.65%	8,225
Monroe	2,390	48.35%	1,369	27.70%	1,173	23.73%	11	0.22%	1,021	20.66%	4,943
Montgomery	8,022	47.26%	5,622	33.12%	3,225	19.00%	106	0.62%	2,400	14.14%	16,975
Morgan	8,223	55.40%	5,721	38.54%	877	5.91%	23	0.15%	2,502	16.86%	14,844
Moultrie	3,001	53.10%	2,403	42.52%	225	3.98%	23	0.41%	598	10.58%	5,652
Ogle	8,449	71.61%	1,591	13.48%	1,727	14.64%	32	0.27%	6,722	56.97%	11,799
Peoria	25,243	58.55%	6,343	14.71%	11,306	26.22%	220	0.51%	13,937	32.33%	43,112
Perry	3,693	39.76%	3,007	32.37%	2,536	27.30%	53	0.57%	686	7.39%	9,289
Piatt	3,799	64.31%	1,733	29.34%	354	5.99%	21	0.36%	2,066	34.98%	5,907
Pike	4,989	45.59%	5,424	49.57%	481	4.40%	49	0.45%	-435	-3.98%	10,943
Pope	2,161	66.51%	978	30.10%	106	3.26%	4	0.12%	1,183	36.41%	3,249
Pulaski	3,355	61.57%	1,700	31.20%	390	7.16%	4	0.07%	1,655	30.37%	5,449
Putnam	1,364	61.50%	260	11.72%	586	26.42%	8	0.36%	778	35.08%	2,218
Randolph	4,527	41.61%	3,734	34.32%	2,591	23.81%	28	0.26%	793	7.29%	10,880
Richland	3,082	50.07%	2,749	44.66%	295	4.79%	29	0.47%	333	5.41%	6,155
Rock Island	20,563	57.69%	3,631	10.19%	11,320	31.76%	133	0.37%	9,243	25.93%	35,647
Saline	6,084	47.03%	4,037	31.21%	2,743	21.20%	73	0.56%	2,047	15.82%	12,937
Sangamon	23,443	51.58%	12,640	27.81%	9,054	19.92%	309	0.68%	10,803	23.77%	45,446
Schuyler	2,729	46.21%	2,860	48.43%	298	5.05%	19	0.32%	-131	-2.22%	5,906
Scott	2,227	50.49%	1,994	45.21%	180	4.08%	10	0.23%	233	5.28%	4,411
Shelby	5,605	48.13%	5,265	45.21%	717	6.16%	59	0.51%	340	2.92%	11,646
St. Clair	23,380	45.85%	14,921	29.26%	12,468	24.45%	225	0.44%	8,459	16.59%	50,994
Stark	2,698	71.07%	784	20.65%	310	8.17%	4	0.11%	1,914	50.42%	3,796
Stephenson	8,638	53.27%	2,452	15.12%	5,088	31.38%	38	0.23%	3,550	21.89%	16,216
Tazewell	7,488	52.11%	3,375	23.49%	3,470	24.15%	37	0.26%	4,018	27.96%	14,370
Union	2,579	39.16%	3,783	57.44%	216	3.28%	8	0.12%	-1,204	-18.28%	6,586
Vermilion	17,822	54.64%	6,424	19.70%	8,073	24.75%	296	0.91%	9,749	29.89%	32,615
Wabash	2,564	45.61%	2,442	43.44%	589	10.48%	26	0.46%	122	2.17%	5,621
Warren	6,912	65.07%	2,440	22.97%	1,225	11.53%	46	0.43%	4,472	42.10%	10,623
Washington	3,444	56.43%	1,717	28.13%	917	15.03%	25	0.41%	1,727	28.30%	6,103
Wayne	4,937	52.70%	4,247	45.34%	164	1.75%	20	0.21%	690	7.37%	9,368
White	3,780	44.71%	4,377	51.77%	278	3.29%	19	0.22%	-597	-7.06%	8,454
Whiteside	11,532	74.04%	1,957	12.56%	2,057	13.21%	30	0.19%	9,475	60.83%	15,576
Will	22,780	64.16%	4,707	13.26%	7,902	22.26%	116	0.33%	14,878	41.90%	35,505
Williamson	9,366	45.27%	6,117	29.57%	5,114	24.72%	92	0.44%	3,249	15.70%	20,689
Winnebago	21,978	71.32%	2,228	7.23%	6,434	20.88%	174	0.56%	15,544	50.44%	30,814
Woodford	4,290	57.48%	1,828	24.49%	1,326	17.77%	20	0.27%	2,462	32.98%	7,464
Totals	1,453,321	58.84%	576,975	23.36%	432,027	17.49%	7,744	0.31%	876,346	35.48%	2,470,067

== Analysis ==
After polls in mid-October suggested a trend toward him, Davis intended to campaign downstate, but never did so. As election day neared, it became clearer that Coolidge would carry Illinois, although at the beginning of the fourth week of October it was thought he would win by only half Harding's 1920 margin, even with La Follette abandoning his campaigns in the Corn Belt. Polls on October 29 further confirmed Illinois as in Coolidge's hands,

Ultimately Coolidge won by substantially more than the mid-October predictions, although by less than Harding had in 1920. Davis did regain seven of the thirteen counties that defected to the GOP for the first time in 1920, but still did worse than any other major party nominee in Illinois presidential election history except William Howard Taft in 1912. La Follette ran third below Davis, running far below his performance in his adjacent home state of Wisconsin and other states to the northwest, but nonetheless performed extremely well for a third party in German Catholic precincts and in industrial areas of the Upper Mississippi Valley adjacent to Iowa. The Wisconsin Senator did carry one county – German Catholic Clinton – which was the nation's southeasternmost county to vote for La Follette. Coolidge maintained the dominance that Warren Harding had enjoyed in 1920, despite losing substantial German Catholic and Mississippi Valley industrial support to La Folette. This is the most recent presidential election in which Illinois would vote to the right of neighboring Indiana.

== See also ==
- United States presidential elections in Illinois
