= Florida State Road 327 =

State highway in Florida, United States

State Road 327
- SR 327 in red, CR 327 in blue

Route information
- Maintained by FDOT
- Length: 0.589 mi (948 m)

Major junctions
- South end: SR 368 in Panama City
- North end: SR 390 in Pretty Bayou

Location
- Country: United States
- State: Florida
- Counties: Bay

Highway system
- Florida State Highway System; Interstate; US; State; Former; Pre‑1945; Toll; Scenic
← SR 326	→ SR 329

State Road 327 (SR 327) is carried by Lisenby Avenue in Panama City, Florida. Its southern terminus is SR 368 (23rd Street), and its northern terminus is SR 390 (St. Andrews Boulevard).

Until the late 1970s, Lisenby Avenue from its intersection with Airport Road (then SR 391) to its intersection with 15th Street (U.S. Route 98/SR 30) was signed as State Road S-327. In the early 1980s, the state shields were replaced by blue county shields, which designated the stretch as County Road 327 (CR 327). Then, in 1989, the portion north of 23rd Street (State Road 368) was taken over by the state, and the county shields were replaced by modern state shields. (The portion south of 23rd Street remained County 327).

Due to a major airport remodeling, the northern tip of State Road 327 was truncated in the late 1990s, and in about 2005, the entire stretch of Lisenby Avenue north of State Road 390 was given over to local maintenance.

== Major intersections ==
The entire route is in Bay County.

Location	mi	km	Destinations	Notes
Panama City	0.000	0.000	SR 368 (23rd Street) / Lisenby Avenue (CR 327 south)	
Panama City	0.159	0.256	SR 391 (Airport Road)	
Pretty Bayou	0.589	0.948	SR 390 (St. Andrews Boulevard)	
1.000 mi = 1.609 km; 1.000 km = 0.621 mi
