= Albert R. Welsh =

American politician (1860–1930)

Albert Ransom Welsh (1860 – September 22, 1930) was an American politician active in Florida and the only Republican elected to the Florida Senate between 1872 and 1952.

== Biography ==
Welsh was a realtor by profession. Riding on the coattails of Herbert Hoover's victory in the 1928 election, Welsh was elected to the Florida Senate as part of a well-organized slate in Pinellas County that also won a number of local offices. Welsh defeated member of the Florida House of Representatives and Democratic candidate S. D. Harris. He was elected to represent the 11th district.

He died September 22, 1930. In the 1930 general election, S. D. Harris, Welsh's 1928 opponent, was elected to succeed him.
