= 1924 United States presidential election in North Carolina =

- November 4, 1924

Nominee	John W. Davis	Calvin Coolidge
Party	Democratic	Republican
Home state	West Virginia	Massachusetts
Running mate	Charles W. Bryan	Charles G. Dawes
Electoral vote	12	0
Popular vote	284,270	191,753
Percentage	58.89%	39.73%
County results
Davis
50–60%
60–70%
70–80%
80–90%
90–100%
Coolidge
50–60%
60–70%
80–90%
President before election
Calvin Coolidge
Republican
Elected President
Calvin Coolidge
Republican

The 1924 United States presidential election in North Carolina took place on November 4, 1924, as part of the 1924 United States presidential election, which was held throughout all contemporary forty-eight states. Voters chose twelve representatives, or electors to the Electoral College, who voted for president and vice president.

As a former Confederate state, North Carolina had a history of Jim Crow laws, disfranchisement of its African-American population and dominance of the Democratic Party in state politics. However, unlike the Deep South, the Republican Party had sufficient historic Unionist white support from the mountains and northwestern Piedmont to gain a stable one-third of the statewide vote total in most general elections A rapid move following disenfranchisement to a completely “lily-white” state GOP also helped maintain Republican support amongst the state's voters. Like Virginia, Tennessee and Oklahoma, the relative strength of Republican opposition meant that North Carolina did not have statewide white primaries, although certain counties did use the white primary.

In 1920, with the passage of the Nineteenth Amendment, North Carolina became the first former Confederate state to abolish its poll tax, which when in force was less severe than other former Confederate states with the result that more whites participated. In that election North Carolina would, alongside Kentucky, see the largest mobilisation of female voters in the entire country. Despite some thought that Republican nominee Harding might threaten to carry the state, in fact North Carolina showed the smallest swing against the Democrats of any state in the Union.

During the prolonged Democratic Party primaries, North Carolina shifted its delegates between William Gibbs McAdoo, Virginian Carter Glass, and Alabamian Oscar W. Underwood, except for a few votes for favorite son George Gordon Battle. Ultimately neither McAdoo nor New York Governor Al Smith – who represented the immigrant, anti-Prohibition wing of the party – could prove acceptable to all Democratic delegates and the nomination went to a compromise candidate in Wall Street lawyer John W. Davis of West Virginia. Although West Virginia was a border state whose limited African-American population had not been disenfranchised, Davis did share the extreme social conservatism of Southern Democrats of his era; he supported poll taxes and opposed women's suffrage. In addition, Davis, like Coolidge, favored strictly limited government. At the same time a progressive third-party run was predicted as early as winter 1923–24, and ultimately Wisconsin Senator Robert M. La Follette would be nominated by the “Committee for Progressive Political Action”.

None of the three candidates did any campaigning in a state which had voted Democratic at every election since 1876. All media polls from September onwards suggested that North Carolina would always go to Davis. A Digest poll at the end of October, which included votes for some candidates not on the ballot, had Davis winning by 21.5 percentage points, and that proved a good guide to the final margin, which saw Davis carry North Carolina by 19.16 points, an increase of 5.68 points upon James M. Cox’s margin in 1920 and in fact 2.77 points greater than Woodrow Wilson’s margin in the state in 1916. Although Progressive Party candidate La Follette would relegate Davis to third in twelve states and carry his home state of Wisconsin, he had almost no appeal in pro-League of Nations North Carolina. With only 1.38 percent of the vote, North Carolina would be La Follette’s second-weakest state after neighbouring South Carolina.

== Results ==
1924 United States presidential election in North Carolina
Party	Candidate	Votes	%
Democratic	John W. Davis	284,270	58.89%
Republican	Calvin Coolidge (incumbent)	191,753	39.73%
Progressive	Robert M. La Follette	6,651	1.38%
Prohibition	Herman P. Faris	13 (Note: These votes were given as a statewide total and not separated by county.)	0.00%
Total votes		482,674	100%

=== Results by county ===
1924 United States presidential election in North Carolina by county
County	John William Davis Democratic		John Calvin Coolidge Republican		Robert M. La Follette Sr. Progressive		Margin	
County	%	#	%	#	%	#	%	#
Robeson	92.53%	4,064	7.15%	314	0.32%	14	85.38%	3,750
Currituck	91.16%	670	7.07%	52	1.77%	13	84.08%	618
Bertie	91.59%	1,785	8.16%	159	0.26%	5	83.43%	1,626
Northampton	91.17%	1,662	7.90%	144	0.93%	17	83.27%	1,518
Halifax	90.20%	3,232	7.48%	268	2.32%	83	82.72%	2,964
Edgecombe	89.04%	2,274	6.70%	171	4.27%	109	82.34%	2,103
Anson	90.47%	2,372	8.58%	225	0.95%	25	81.88%	2,147
Martin	89.88%	1,999	9.71%	216	0.40%	9	80.17%	1,783
Warren	88.43%	1,742	8.43%	166	3.15%	62	80.00%	1,576
Craven	88.86%	2,942	9.82%	325	1.33%	44	79.04%	2,617
Hoke	88.77%	1,146	10.92%	141	0.31%	4	77.85%	1,005
Chowan	87.39%	714	12.00%	98	0.61%	5	75.40%	616
Scotland	87.18%	1,469	12.17%	205	0.65%	11	75.01%	1,264
Franklin	86.34%	1,991	13.10%	302	0.56%	13	73.24%	1,689
Greene	85.55%	1,119	13.91%	182	0.54%	7	71.64%	937
Pitt	84.91%	3,197	13.60%	512	1.49%	56	71.31%	2,685
Hertford	84.80%	932	14.92%	164	0.27%	3	69.88%	768
Granville	82.37%	2,220	17.11%	461	0.52%	14	65.27%	1,759
Pender	81.31%	1,175	17.51%	253	1.18%	17	63.81%	922
Wilson	79.99%	2,619	17.53%	574	2.47%	81	62.46%	2,045
Vance	80.39%	2,013	18.77%	470	0.84%	21	61.62%	1,543
Lenoir	80.26%	2,191	18.83%	514	0.92%	25	61.43%	1,677
Pasquotank	79.59%	1,236	19.64%	305	0.77%	12	59.95%	931
Union	79.45%	2,721	19.62%	672	0.93%	32	59.82%	2,049
Jones	79.27%	692	20.50%	179	0.23%	2	58.76%	513
Richmond	76.46%	2,475	18.50%	599	5.04%	163	57.95%	1,876
Nash	76.63%	3,129	20.16%	823	3.21%	131	56.48%	2,306
New Hanover	74.80%	4,735	18.80%	1,190	6.40%	405	56.00%	3,545
Camden	75.56%	436	22.88%	132	1.56%	9	52.69%	304
Gates	75.87%	679	24.02%	215	0.11%	1	51.84%	464
Mecklenburg	73.73%	8,443	22.46%	2,572	3.82%	437	51.27%	5,871
Wake	70.77%	8,376	25.14%	2,975	4.10%	485	45.63%	5,401
Onslow	71.19%	1,122	26.84%	423	1.97%	31	44.35%	699
Lee	71.81%	1,834	27.80%	710	0.39%	10	44.01%	1,124
Wayne	70.32%	3,366	28.81%	1,379	0.88%	42	41.51%	1,987
Caswell	69.53%	1,075	30.21%	467	0.26%	4	39.33%	608
Cleveland	67.81%	3,749	31.52%	1,743	0.67%	37	36.28%	2,006
Cumberland	67.47%	2,923	31.67%	1,372	0.85%	37	35.80%	1,551
Hyde	67.04%	653	31.31%	305	1.64%	16	35.73%	348
Beaufort	65.65%	3,048	32.35%	1,502	2.00%	93	33.30%	1,546
Bladen	65.72%	1,551	33.31%	786	0.97%	23	32.42%	765
Duplin	64.93%	2,924	34.24%	1,542	0.82%	37	30.69%	1,382
Haywood	65.18%	4,582	34.71%	2,440	0.11%	8	30.47%	2,142
Perquimans	64.48%	550	34.58%	295	0.94%	8	29.89%	255
Gaston	64.24%	6,554	34.95%	3,566	0.80%	82	29.29%	2,988
Iredell	63.54%	6,449	35.12%	3,565	1.34%	136	28.41%	2,884
Orange	62.43%	1,879	35.38%	1,065	2.19%	66	27.04%	814
Pamlico	63.48%	798	36.52%	459	0.00%	0	26.97%	339
Rockingham	62.72%	4,467	36.03%	2,566	1.25%	89	26.69%	1,901
Columbus	62.49%	2,757	36.92%	1,629	0.59%	26	25.57%	1,128
Buncombe	59.93%	10,098	37.30%	6,285	2.77%	467	22.63%	3,813
Durham	59.34%	4,837	37.95%	3,093	2.71%	221	21.40%	1,744
Person	60.52%	1,576	39.36%	1,025	0.12%	3	21.16%	551
Alamance	59.48%	4,859	39.38%	3,217	1.14%	93	20.10%	1,642
Tyrrell	59.02%	638	40.89%	442	0.09%	1	18.13%	196
Moore	57.93%	2,771	41.27%	1,974	0.79%	38	16.66%	797
Forsyth	56.18%	7,404	40.33%	5,315	3.48%	459	15.85%	2,089
Caldwell	56.97%	3,348	42.59%	2,503	0.44%	26	14.38%	845
Alleghany	56.99%	1,643	42.80%	1,234	0.21%	6	14.19%	409
Rowan	52.84%	4,816	39.06%	3,560	8.10%	738	13.78%	1,256
Dare	56.69%	826	43.17%	629	0.14%	2	13.52%	197
Rutherford	56.51%	5,101	43.17%	3,897	0.32%	29	13.34%	1,204
Burke	56.46%	4,137	43.54%	3,190	0.00%	0	12.92%	947
Guilford	55.22%	8,804	42.79%	6,822	1.99%	317	12.43%	1,982
Cabarrus	54.60%	4,449	43.08%	3,510	2.32%	189	11.52%	939
Chatham	55.44%	3,446	44.32%	2,755	0.24%	15	11.12%	691
Carteret	54.75%	2,261	44.89%	1,854	0.36%	15	9.85%	407
Yancey	54.35%	2,592	45.21%	2,156	0.44%	21	9.14%	436
Montgomery	54.39%	2,483	45.50%	2,077	0.11%	5	8.89%	406
McDowell	53.62%	3,023	45.94%	2,590	0.44%	25	7.68%	433
Harnett	53.14%	3,296	46.68%	2,895	0.18%	11	6.47%	401
Polk	52.52%	1,613	47.05%	1,445	0.42%	13	5.47%	168
Jackson	52.50%	3,100	47.21%	2,788	0.29%	17	5.28%	312
Ashe	52.28%	4,333	47.68%	3,952	0.04%	3	4.60%	381
Lincoln	51.86%	2,909	47.39%	2,658	0.75%	42	4.47%	251
Macon	51.72%	2,178	47.85%	2,015	0.43%	18	3.87%	163
Stanly	51.26%	3,832	48.07%	3,594	0.67%	50	3.18%	238
Washington	51.25%	883	48.40%	834	0.35%	6	2.84%	49
Davidson	50.88%	6,507	48.69%	6,227	0.44%	56	2.19%	280
Transylvania	49.17%	1,776	50.22%	1,814	0.61%	22	-1.05%	-38
Catawba	48.28%	5,754	50.32%	5,998	1.40%	167	-2.05%	-244
Johnston	48.56%	4,656	51.20%	4,910	0.24%	23	-2.65%	-254
Alexander	48.25%	2,291	51.33%	2,437	0.42%	20	-3.07%	-146
Stokes	47.76%	2,309	51.33%	2,482	0.91%	44	-3.58%	-173
Graham	47.81%	841	51.56%	907	0.63%	11	-3.75%	-66
Watauga	46.94%	2,365	52.90%	2,665	0.16%	8	-5.95%	-300
Surry	46.63%	4,418	52.67%	4,990	0.70%	66	-6.04%	-572
Clay	46.24%	953	52.89%	1,090	0.87%	18	-6.65%	-137
Brunswick	45.54%	1,118	52.79%	1,296	1.67%	41	-7.25%	-178
Randolph	45.90%	5,397	53.89%	6,336	0.20%	24	-7.99%	-939
Henderson	45.54%	3,007	53.73%	3,548	0.73%	48	-8.19%	-541
Swain	44.55%	1,769	54.85%	2,178	0.60%	24	-10.30%	-409
Cherokee	42.71%	1,742	56.73%	2,314	0.56%	23	-14.02%	-572
Davie	40.07%	1,795	59.64%	2,672	0.29%	13	-19.58%	-877
Sampson	38.54%	2,021	60.79%	3,188	0.67%	35	-22.25%	-1,167
Wilkes	36.86%	3,586	63.02%	6,131	0.11%	11	-26.16%	-2,545
Yadkin	32.26%	1,381	67.48%	2,889	0.26%	11	-35.23%	-1,508
Madison	30.66%	1,471	67.79%	3,252	1.54%	74	-37.13%	-1,781
Mitchell	30.80%	689	68.84%	1,540	0.36%	8	-38.04%	-851
Avery	13.95%	357	85.51%	2,189	0.55%	14	-71.56%	-1,832

== See also ==
- United States presidential elections in North Carolina
