= Florida State Road 368 =

State highway in Florida, United States

State Road 368
- SR 368 in red, SR 368A in blue

Route information
- Maintained by FDOT
- Length: 5.388 mi (8.671 km)

Major junctions
- West end: US 98 in Panama City
- East end: US 231 in Panama City

Location
- Country: United States
- State: Florida
- Counties: Bay

Highway system
- Florida State Highway System; Interstate; US; State; Former; Pre‑1945; Toll; Scenic
| ← SR 366 | → SR 369 |

State Road 368 (SR 368) is a short state road an east–west "bypass route", locally known as 23rd Street, in and around the vicinity of Panama City, Florida. The road is entirely four-lanes wide with center left-turn lanes where available, and is divided only at its eastern terminus. No roads overlap SR 368 or vice versa.

== Route description ==
State Road 368 begins at an interchange with U.S. Route 98 (SR 30) in St. Andrews, next to Gulf Coast State College, and across from the Port Authority of Panama City. The road runs northeast from US 98 along the main line of the former Atlanta and Saint Andrews Bay Railway which moves away from the road at West 20th Street, then turns north and then east. The route remains at this trajectory for the rest of its journey. From there it skirts along the southern border of Pretty Bayou where it intersects such highways as State Road 390 and later County Road 385 (Frankford Avenue), one of three routes leading north to Panama City-Bay County International Airport. Entering Panama City, the road serves as the southern terminus of State Road 327 and the northern terminus of its county extension County Road 327 (North Lisenby Avenue). This road also leads to the airport. Three blocks later, it has a diagonal intersection with State Road 391 (Airport Road), which as the name implies leads to the airport as well.

The rest of the road passes by such sites as the Gulf Coast College Seminary, Gulf Coast Medical Center, and Forest Lawn Memorial Cemetery, before entering the northeast side of the city and crossing an intersection with State Road 77, the southeast corner of which includes the Panama City Mall. State Road 368 terminates at an at-grade interchange with U.S. Route 231 (SR 75), just east of its own intersection with SR 77.

== Major intersections ==
The entire route is in Panama City, Bay County.

| mi | km | Destinations | Notes |
|---|---|---|---|
| 0.000 | 0.000 | US 98 (SR 30) | The Western Terminus at US-98 is now an interchange with on and off ramps connecting SR-368 to the elevated US-98. The interchange opened in February 2021. |
| 0.610 | 0.982 | Collegiate Drive (SR 368A west) - Florida State University Panama City Campus | |
| 1.812 | 2.916 | SR 390 (Beck Avenue) | |
| 2.339 | 3.764 | CR 385 (Frankford Avenue) | |
| 2.840 | 4.571 | SR 327 north | Southern terminus of SR 327 |
| 3.116 | 5.015 | SR 391 (Airport Road) – Troy University, Junior Museum of Bay County | |
| 4.092 | 6.585 | CR 2341 (Jenks Avenue) | |
| 4.845 | 7.797 | SR 77 (Martin Luther King Jr. Boulevard) | |
| 5.388 | 8.671 | US 231 (SR 75) | Eastern terminus |
1.000 mi = 1.609 km; 1.000 km = 0.621 mi

== Related routes ==
=== County Road 368 (Liberty and Wakulla counties) ===
County Road 368
- Location: Liberty and Wakulla Counties

Further to the east in Liberty and Wakulla counties is a route designated County Road 368 that has no connection to SR 368, but was once itself a former secondary state road. The route begins at CR 67 within Apalachicola National Forest as National Forest Highway 13, which crosses a bridge over the Ochlockonee River, and thus crosses the Liberty-Wakulla County Line. From there it intersects CR 375 near Smith Creek, Florida, and continues to wind east through the forest. Within Arran, Florida, the road becomes Arran Road, although some maps describe it as "Bay Road." CR 368 ends at US 319 in Crawfordville, Florida and becomes Martin Luther King Junior Memorial Road just south of where CR 61 branches off of US 319.

=== State Road 368A ===
State Road 368A
- Location: Panama City
- Length: 0.690 mi (1,110 m)

Florida State Road 368A (SR 368A) is a spur of SR 368, designed Collegiate Drive, in Panama City. The road, which runs 0.69 miles, serves Florida State University, Gulf Coast State College and Carl Gray Park near North Bay. The entire route is unsigned.

The entire route is in Panama City, Bay County.

| mi | km | Destinations | Notes |
|---|---|---|---|
| 0.000 | 0.000 | Collegiate Drive | west end of state maintenance |
| 0.281 | 0.452 | North Bay Drive | |
| 0.551 | 0.887 | College Street / Collegiate Lane - Gulf Coast State College, Florida State University Panama City Campus | |
| 0.690 | 1.110 | SR 368 (23rd Street) | Eastern terminus |
1.000 mi = 1.609 km; 1.000 km = 0.621 mi
