= Bay County Courthouse (Florida) =

Coordinates: 30.1552°N 85.65786°W

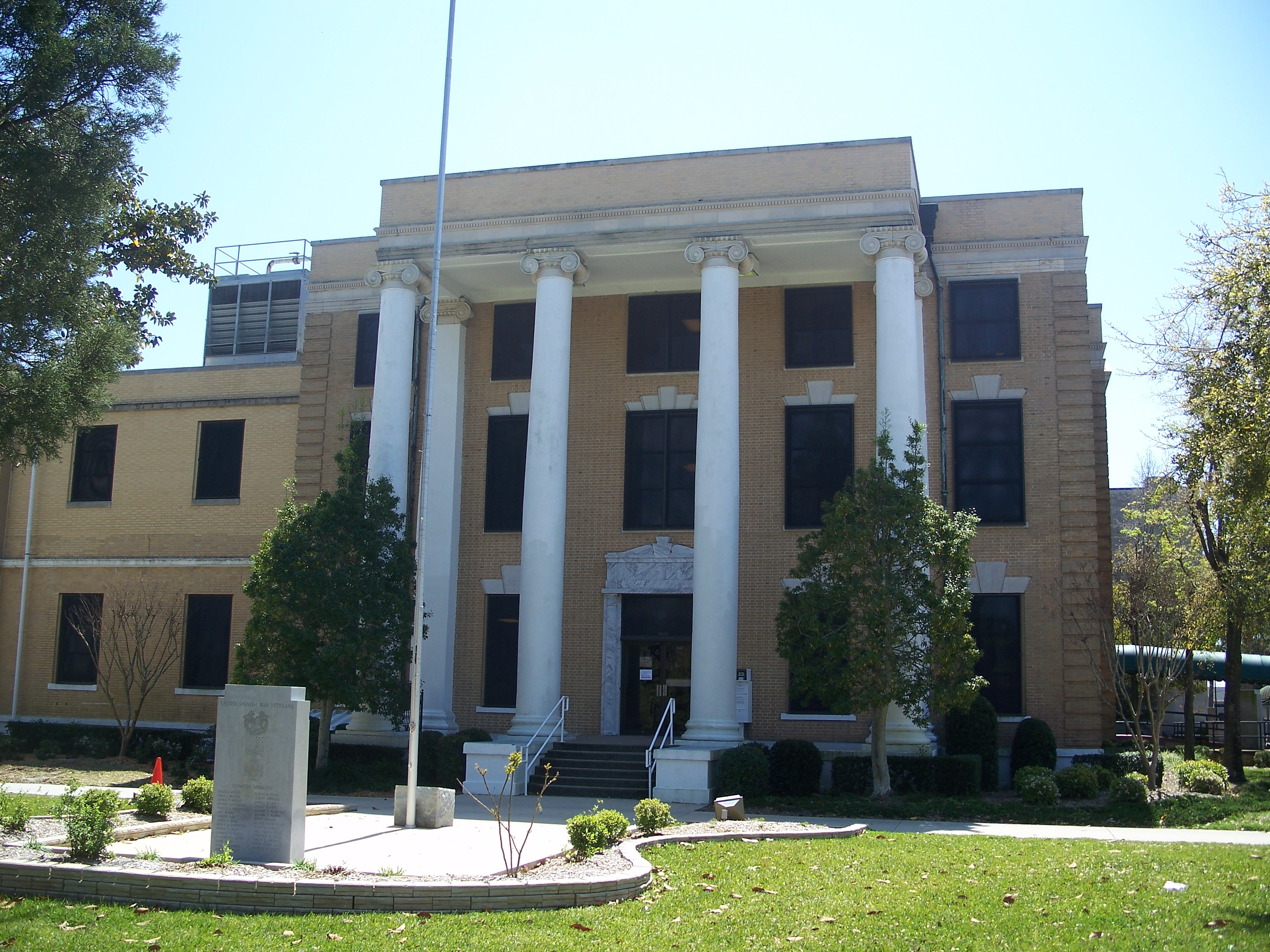
- Bay County Courthouse
- Interactive map of the Bay County Courthouse area

General information
- Architectural style: Classical Revival
- Location: Panama City, Florida, United States
- Completed: 1915, rebuilt after 1920 fire
- Cost: $
- Client: Bay County

Design and construction
- Engineer: Builder:

The Bay County Courthouse is an historic yellow brick courthouse building located at 300 East 4th Street in Panama City, Florida. Built in 1915 in the Classical Revival style, it is Bay County's first and only courthouse. After a 1920 fire gutted the building, it was rebuilt in a much simpler form without its entrance pediment, gabled roof system and ornate central clock tower. The entrance columns and entablature, however, were retained. Later additions have been built on its left side.

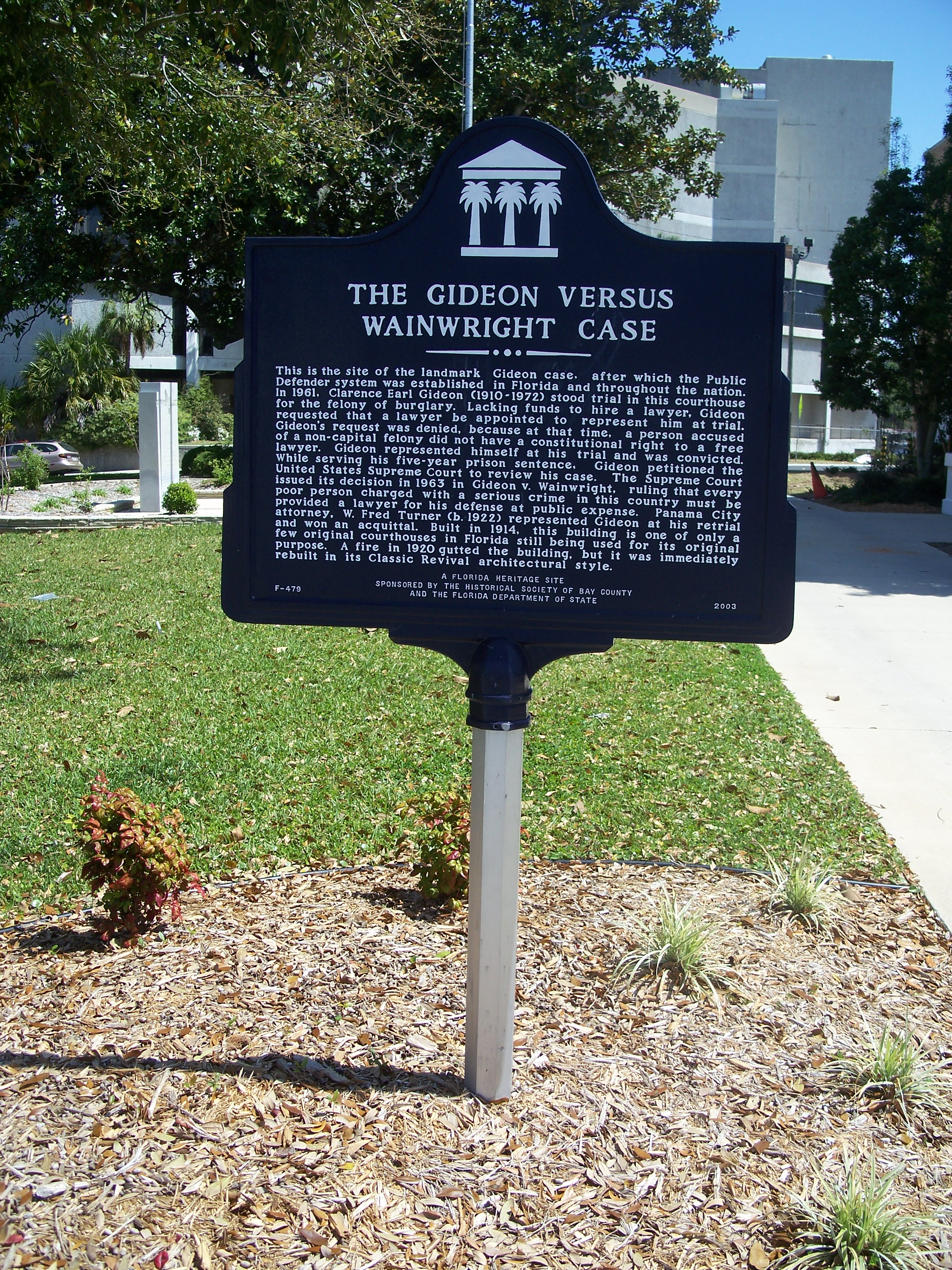
Gideon v. Wainwright historic marker on courthouse grounds

In August 1961 the Bay County Courthouse was the scene of the trial and conviction of Clarence Earl Gideon for felony theft. The court's refusal to provide Gideon with legal representation was overturned in the famous U. S. Supreme Court case of Gideon v. Wainwright. Gideon was retried here in August 1963 and was acquitted.

In 1989, the Bay County Courthouse was listed in A Guide to Florida's Historic Architecture, published by the University of Florida Press.
