= Bayway =

- Headquarters: 1116 Frankford Ave
- Locale: Panama City, Florida
- Service area: Bay County, Florida
- Service type: bus service demand-responsive transport
- Routes: 8
- Hubs: Gulf Coast State College
- Daily ridership: 1,653 Per Weekday (2024)
- Annual ridership: 470,697 (2024)
- Website: www.baywaytransit.org

Bayway (formerly Bay Town Trolley) is the primary provider of mass transportation in Bay County, Florida. The system was previously known as the Bay Town Trolley, due to the majority of buses in the fleet being tourist trolleys. However, the fleet has gradually been replaced with traditional-style buses. The Bayway system includes fixed-route buses and demand-response service.

The system got 1.653 boardings per weekday in 2024 per the NTD.

== History ==
Bay County's public transportation system was created in 1983.

In 2009, the agency expanded from provided weekday-only to Monday-Saturday service all year round. Previously, buses only ran on Saturdays during the peak tourist season.

In 2021, the Bay Town Trolley announced the intent to change the name and branding of the public transportation system. Members of the community were invited to provide suggested names via the service's website. An online vote was held in February 2022, with the new name being announced in July 2022 for a switchover in August 2022 to Bayway.

== Service ==
=== Routes ===
- 1 Lynn Haven and Panama City Mall
- 2 Panama City Hall/Marina and Callaway Walmart
- 3 Panama City Mall and Callaway Walmart
- 4 Panama City Hall/Marina and Gulf Coast State College
- 5 Panama City Mall and Gulf Coast State College via 23rd St
- 6 Panama City Mall and Gulf Coast State College via 16th St
- 7 Gulf Coast State College and West End Winn-Dixie
- X Callaway Wallmart and Mexico Beach, FL (Express Route)

=== On-demand ===
Bayway offers an on-demand service and Uber subsidies for qualifying riders who are elderly, disabled, or below a certain income level.
