= 1928 United States presidential election in Florida =

- November 6, 1928

Nominee	Herbert Hoover	Al Smith
Party	Republican	Democratic
Home state	California	New York
Running mate	Charles Curtis	Joseph Taylor Robinson
Electoral vote	6	0
Popular vote	144,168	101,764
Percentage	56.83%	40.12%
County results
Hoover
40–50%
50–60%
60–70%
70–80%
Smith
30–40%
50–60%
60–70%
70–80%
80–90%
President before election
Calvin Coolidge
Republican
Elected President
Herbert Hoover
Republican

The 1928 United States presidential election in Florida was held on November 6, 1928, as part of the 1928 United States presidential election held throughout all contemporary forty-eight states. Florida voters chose six electors, or representatives to the Electoral College, who voted for president and vice president.

Ever since the disfranchisement of blacks at the beginning of the 1890s, Florida had been a one-party state ruled by the Democratic Party. The disfranchisement of blacks and poor whites by poll taxes in 1889 had left the Republican Party – between 1872 and 1888 dependent upon black votes – virtually extinct. With the single exception of William Howard Taft's win in Calhoun County in 1908 the Democratic Party won every county in Florida in every presidential election from 1892 (Note: In the 1892 presidential election, Republican Benjamin Harrison was not on the ballot; the party backed Populist James B. Weaver.) until 1916. Only twice – and never for more than one term – did any Republican serve in either house of the state legislature between 1896 and 1928. Despite this Democratic dominance and the restrictions on the franchise of the poorer classes due to the poll tax, significant socialist movements were to develop and persist in Tampa and to a lesser extent over other parts of the state, especially against the powerful Ku Klux Klan. There was also a powerful Prohibitionist movement in older North Florida, which saw the Prohibition Party even win the governorship for one term under the notorious anti-Catholic minister Sidney J. Catts, who was later to be a major foe of Al Smith.

The 1920 presidential election saw Warren Harding, aided substantially by isolationist sentiment in the region, gain more support in the former Confederacy than any Republican since black disfranchisement, and in the process win three Florida counties. Calvin Coolidge in 1924 was to do no more than maintain these gains, but did show that the presidential GOP vote from transplanted Northerners was equal to or greater than the traditional Unionist GOP vote (which Florida entirely lacked) of Texas, Arkansas, Alabama or Georgia.

During the months between the beginning of the campaign and the actual vote, a number of newspapers – including the Orlando Sentinel and the St. Petersburg Times – utilized voting machines to take a sample ballot. All these polls, in spite of the fact that the newspapers in question favored Smith, gave large majorities to Hoover, in the case of the Times by over two-to-one. Despite these polls, Smith campaigners took a long time to realize the danger that he would not carry the traditional "Solid South".

After a heated campaign in which he had played little part, Herbert Hoover won Florida against Al Smith by 42,404 votes or by a margin of 16.71 percentage points. Vis-à-vis the 1924 election, swings of up to 100 percentage points occurred in the western Panhandle pineywoods, where opposition to Smith's Catholic religion reached the fanatical, and Hoover also gained from increased Republican voting by northern migrants in Miami, Tampa, Fort Lauderdale, Sarasota and Jacksonville, along with the growth of an urban middle class in those cities. This was the first time since 1876 that the state voted Republican. The 1928 US presidential election would be the first time that Florida would become a crucial bellwether state in presidential elections: from 1928 and on, the winner of the presidential election has carried the state in every election except in 1960, in 1992, and in 2020.

In contrast, the counties of the central and eastern Panhandle remained loyal to Smith, who still carried ten counties in this region, all over thirty-five percent nonvoting African-American, by three-to-one or larger majorities, because they saw party regularity as essential to preserving white supremacy against African Americans. However, unlike Alabama and Georgia, Florida lacked the strength to counter anti-Catholic voting – which was indeed stronger than in most other parts of the white South – with the result that Hoover gained his largest margin among the five Confederate states he carried.

== Results ==
Electoral results
Presidential candidate	Party	Home state	Popular vote		Electoral vote	Running mate		
Presidential candidate	Party	Home state	Count	Percentage	Electoral vote	Vice-presidential candidate	Home state	Electoral vote
Herbert Hoover	Republican	California	144,168 (Note: This total differs from that in America at the Polls but is suspect due to an improbably large third-party vote in Alachua County.)	56.83%	6	Charles Curtis	Kansas	6
Al Smith	Democrat	New York	101,764	40.12%	0	Joseph Taylor Robinson	Arkansas	0
Norman Thomas	Socialist	New York	4,036	1.59%	0	James Maurer	Pennsylvania	0
William Z. Foster	Communist	Illinois	3,704	1.46%	0	Benjamin Gitlow	New York	0
—	Write-ins	—	2	0.00%	0	—	—	0
Total			253,674	100%	6			6
Needed to win					266			266

=== Results by county ===
County	Herbert Clark Hoover Republican		Alfred Emmanuel Smith Democratic		Various candidates Other parties		Margin		Total votes cast
County	#	%	#	%	#	%	#	%	Total votes cast
Alachua	1,824	45.51%	1,965	49.03%	219	5.46%	-141	-3.52%	4,008
Baker	676	72.38%	242	25.91%	16	1.71%	434	46.47%	934
Bay	974	44.27%	1,190	54.09%	36	1.64%	-216	-9.82%	2,200
Bradford	534	43.73%	679	55.61%	8	0.66%	-145	-11.88%	1,221
Brevard	1,830	62.12%	1,063	36.08%	53	1.80%	767	26.04%	2,946
Broward	2,889	63.63%	1,564	34.45%	87	1.92%	1,325	29.19%	4,540
Calhoun	409	35.02%	727	62.24%	32	2.74%	-318	-27.23%	1,168
Charlotte	593	55.73%	441	41.45%	30	2.82%	152	14.29%	1,064
Citrus	505	37.77%	816	61.03%	16	1.20%	-311	-23.26%	1,337
Clay	1,088	72.05%	394	26.09%	28	1.85%	694	45.96%	1,510
Collier	151	37.01%	256	62.75%	1	0.25%	-105	-25.74%	408
Columbia	418	24.36%	1,276	74.36%	22	1.28%	-858	-50.00%	1,716
Dade	15,860	60.15%	10,136	38.44%	372	1.41%	5,724	21.71%	26,368
De Soto	1,382	64.04%	748	34.66%	28	1.30%	634	29.38%	2,158
Dixie	463	57.52%	342	42.48%	0	0.00%	121	15.03%	805
Duval	16,919	63.39%	9,316	34.91%	454	1.70%	7,603	28.49%	26,689
Escambia	4,443	53.32%	3,772	45.27%	118	1.42%	671	8.05%	8,333
Flagler	325	58.14%	219	39.18%	15	2.68%	106	18.96%	559
Franklin	334	44.30%	417	55.31%	3	0.40%	-83	-11.01%	754
Gadsden	346	22.31%	1,184	76.34%	21	1.35%	-838	-54.03%	1,551
Gilchrist	125	22.73%	392	71.27%	33	6.00%	-267	-48.55%	550
Glades	331	53.73%	281	45.62%	4	0.65%	50	8.12%	616
Gulf	156	34.98%	275	61.66%	15	3.36%	-119	-26.68%	446
Hamilton	167	16.83%	741	74.70%	84	8.47%	-574	-57.86%	992
Hardee	2,087	70.06%	826	27.73%	66	2.22%	1,261	42.33%	2,979
Hendry	337	54.18%	266	42.77%	19	3.05%	71	11.41%	622
Hernando	661	47.79%	701	50.69%	21	1.52%	-40	-2.89%	1,383
Highlands	1,393	66.52%	669	31.95%	32	1.53%	724	34.57%	2,094
Hillsborough	11,703	52.98%	9,993	45.24%	392	1.77%	1,710	7.74%	22,088
Holmes	2,260	74.44%	735	24.21%	41	1.35%	1,525	50.23%	3,036
Indian River	847	55.61%	657	43.14%	19	1.25%	190	12.48%	1,523
Jackson	1,398	35.43%	2,516	63.76%	32	0.81%	-1,118	-28.33%	3,946
Jefferson	235	20.22%	919	79.09%	8	0.69%	-684	-58.86%	1,162
Lafayette	135	23.48%	435	75.65%	5	0.87%	-300	-52.17%	575
Lake	3,383	68.08%	1,474	29.66%	112	2.25%	1,909	38.42%	4,969
Lee	2,058	63.17%	1,154	35.42%	46	1.41%	904	27.75%	3,258
Leon	630	24.72%	1,888	74.07%	31	1.22%	-1,258	-49.35%	2,549
Levy	711	46.23%	797	51.82%	30	1.95%	-86	-5.59%	1,538
Liberty	147	39.20%	226	60.27%	2	0.53%	-79	-21.07%	375
Madison	266	25.70%	769	74.30%	0	0.00%	-503	-48.60%	1,035
Manatee	2,705	63.87%	1,472	34.76%	58	1.37%	1,233	29.11%	4,235
Marion	1,927	49.75%	1,863	48.10%	83	2.14%	64	1.65%	3,873
Martin	703	58.05%	474	39.14%	34	2.81%	229	18.91%	1,211
Monroe	1,142	36.93%	1,899	61.42%	51	1.65%	-757	-24.48%	3,092
Nassau	863	65.13%	445	33.58%	17	1.28%	418	31.55%	1,325
Okaloosa	1,385	72.70%	503	26.40%	17	0.89%	882	46.30%	1,905
Okeechobee	657	68.87%	287	30.08%	10	1.05%	370	38.78%	954
Orange	6,524	70.04%	2,616	28.08%	175	1.88%	3,908	41.95%	9,315
Osceola	1,760	60.25%	1,127	38.58%	34	1.16%	633	21.67%	2,921
Palm Beach	5,298	64.23%	2,652	32.15%	298	3.61%	2,646	32.08%	8,248
Pasco	1,591	54.26%	1,308	44.61%	33	1.13%	283	9.65%	2,932
Pinellas	10,545	74.52%	3,439	24.30%	167	1.18%	7,106	50.22%	14,151
Polk	7,460	60.23%	4,576	36.94%	350	2.83%	2,884	23.28%	12,386
Putnam	2,105	63.01%	1,156	34.60%	80	2.39%	949	28.40%	3,341
St. John's	1,939	36.65%	3,307	62.50%	45	0.85%	-1,368	-25.86%	5,291
St. Lucie	983	55.88%	741	42.13%	35	1.99%	242	13.76%	1,759
Santa Rosa	1,628	73.97%	541	24.58%	32	1.45%	1,087	49.39%	2,201
Sarasota	1,603	56.46%	1,181	41.60%	55	1.94%	422	14.86%	2,839
Seminole	1,788	58.89%	1,187	39.10%	61	2.01%	601	19.80%	3,036
Sumter	1,152	55.60%	909	43.87%	11	0.53%	243	11.73%	2,072
Suwannee	606	31.68%	1,286	67.22%	21	1.10%	-680	-35.55%	1,913
Taylor	465	38.05%	739	60.47%	18	1.47%	-274	-22.42%	1,222
Union	177	25.69%	503	73.00%	9	1.31%	-326	-47.31%	689
Volusia	6,648	67.78%	3,043	31.03%	117	1.19%	3,605	36.76%	9,808
Wakulla	66	12.18%	470	86.72%	6	1.11%	-404	-74.54%	542
Walton	1,475	61.36%	908	37.77%	21	0.87%	567	23.59%	2,404
Washington	1,672	69.72%	671	27.98%	55	2.29%	1,001	41.74%	2,398
Totals	145,860	57.87%	101,764	40.37%	4,444	1.76%	44,096	17.49%	252,068

== Analysis ==
With all other prominent Democrats sitting the election out, the party nominated Alfred E. Smith, four-term Governor of New York as its nominee for 1928, with little opposition. There was nonetheless almost no pro-Smith sympathy in Florida, which as part of the "Solid South" had been a major force in his 1924 defeat. This defeat was related to four characteristics of Smith that made him anything but an ideal candidate for Southern Democrats: he was a devout Catholic, opposed to Prohibition, linked with New York City's Tammany Hall political machine, and the son of Irish and Italian immigrants. His Wall Street connections also had Smith viewed by poorer Southern whites as a "Gold Democrat". While it is generally thought that the South would have accepted a man possessing one of those characteristics, the combination proved a bitter dose for many of Florida's loyal Democrats. Many Florida Protestants believed Smith's election would endanger religious liberty and would lead to the Pope controlling the White House.

More critically, the Southern Baptist Convention similarly said that

We enter into a sacred covenant and solemn pledge that we will support for the office of President, or any other office, only such men as stand for our present order of prohibition.

Much of this anti-Smith political program was led by the Jacksonville Baptist Association, joined by the Indian River Missionary Baptist Association, Seminole Baptist Association, Peace River Baptist Association, Alachua Baptist Association, and the Florida Baptist Association in issuing similar resolutions at their 1928 annual meetings. The Methodist Episcopal Church took the same view, and it was Bishop James Cannon who stood behind militant "drys" to organize the "Anti-Smith Democrats" in Asheville, North Carolina, pledging to keep the country dry against Smith's support of modifying the Volstead Act.

The leader of the defense of Smith was Senator Duncan Upshaw Fletcher who argued that Smith was a "throroughgoing Democrat" and that the Republican Party was the party who had, in typical "Solid South" style, denounced the Southern people as rebels and traitors.

Echoing this, several Florida judges said it would be better to have a Catholic with some religion in the White House than a Republican with none. Smith's strongest supporter, Chief Justice William H. Ellis, also argued that the GOP was hypocritical in its support for Prohibition, and that because religious tests for elective office were forbidden by the Constitution, Smith would be unable to fill these offices with only Catholics. For Ellis, the election of Smith was the only way the Democratic Party could maintain itself. The Suwanee Democrat, indeed, argued that Hoover's Quaker faith meant he could not be elected President because it believed that Hoover's religious beliefs both would not permit him to fight for his country, and would stipulate racial equality in a state whose electorate was all-white.
