= Sand Hills, Florida =

- Unincorporated Community
- Interactive map of Sand Hills, Florida
- Coordinates: 30°25′53″N 85°41′16″W
- Country: United States
- State: Florida
- County: Bay
- Incorporated (town): None
- Incorporated (city): None
- Time zone: UTC-6 (Central (CST))
  - Summer (DST): UTC-5 (CDT)
- ZIP code: 32409
- Area code: 850

Sand Hills is an unincorporated community in Bay County, Florida, United States. It is located along the north side of North Bay and north of Southport. The main roads through the community are State Road 20 and State Road 77. It is also part of the Panama City-Lynn Haven-Panama City Beach, Florida Metropolitan Statistical Area.

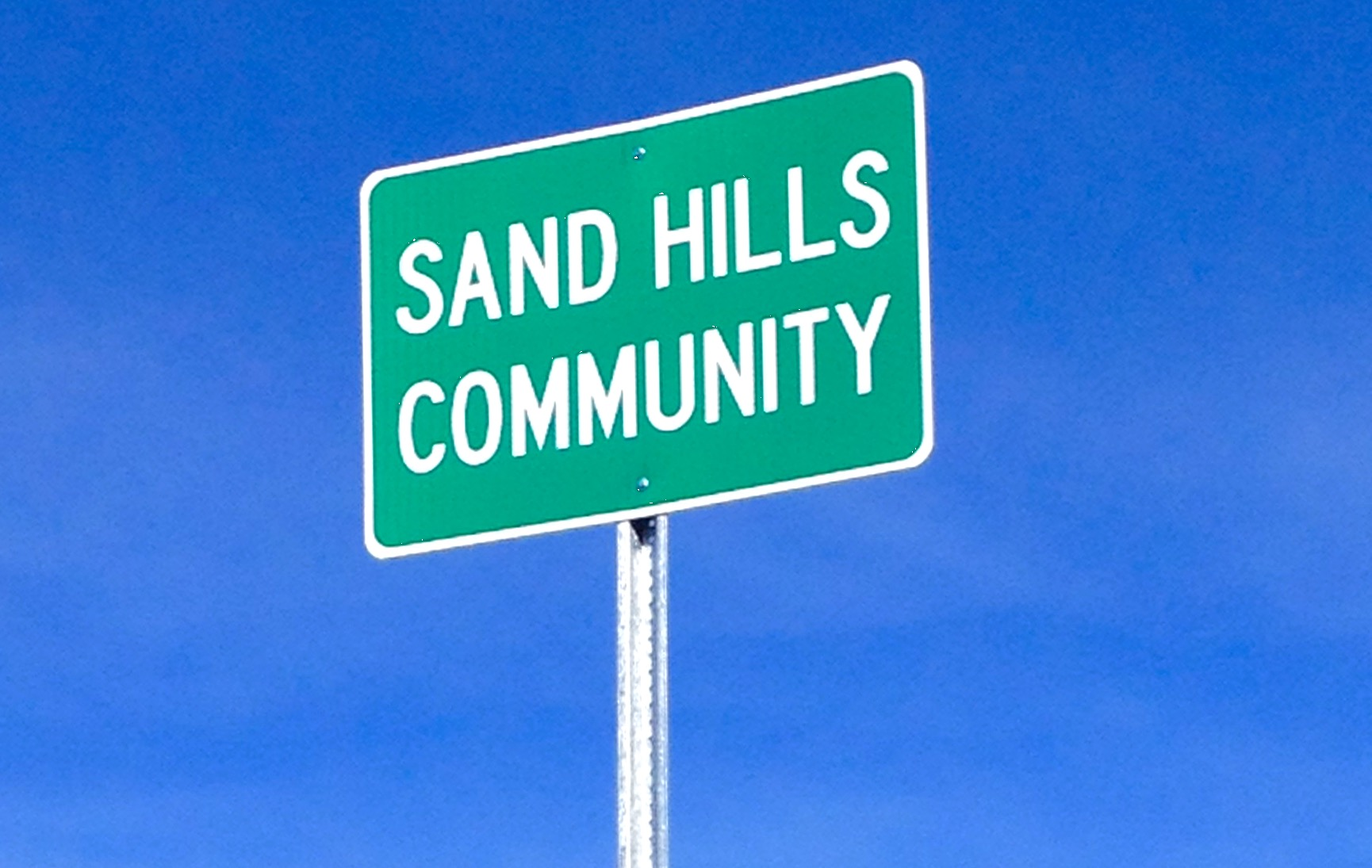
Sand Hills Sign

The area was sanctioned as a "community" and was officially plotted out under the leadership of Ben Baker.
