= Bay County, Florida =

County in Florida, United States

- County
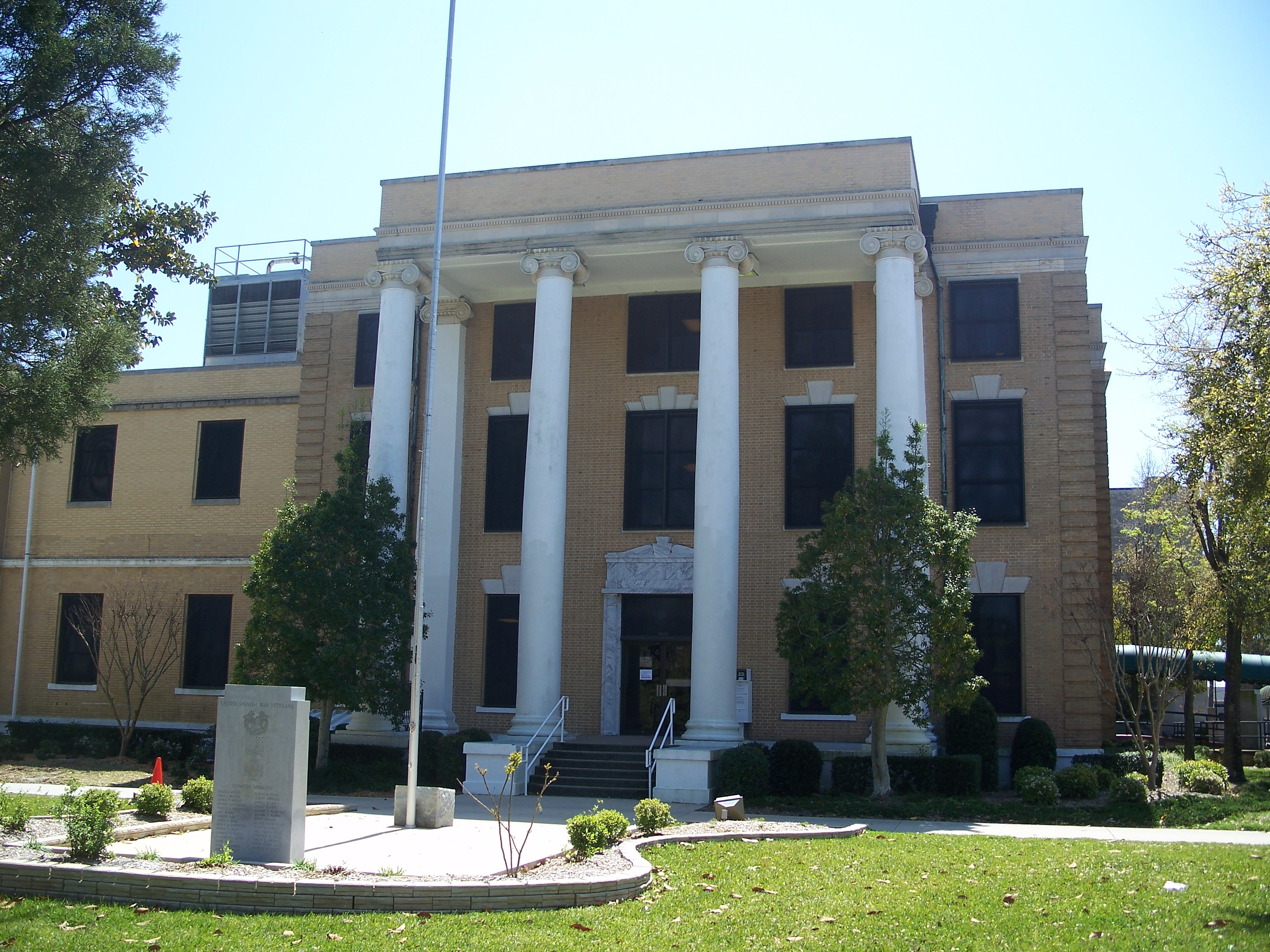
- The Bay County Courthouse in March 2008

- Flag Seal

- Location within the U.S. state of Florida
- Coordinates: 30°14′N 85°38′W
- Country: United States
- State: Florida
- Founded: April 24, 1913
- Named for: St. Andrews Bay
- Seat: Panama City
- Largest city: Panama City

Area
  - Total: 1,033 sq mi (2,680 km^{2})
  - Land: 758 sq mi (1,960 km^{2})
  - Water: 275 sq mi (710 km^{2}) 26.6%

Population (2020)
  - Total: 175,216
  - Estimate (2025): 204,479 ▲
  - Density: 231/sq mi (89.2/km^{2})
- Time zone: UTC−6 (Central)
  - Summer (DST): UTC−5 (CDT)
- Congressional district: 2nd
- Website: www.baycountyfl.gov

Bay County is a county on the Emerald Coast in Northwest Florida. As of the 2020 census, the population was 175,216. Its county seat is Panama City. Bay County is included in the Panama City, Florida metropolitan area.

== History ==
On February 12, 1913, representatives from five towns on St. Andrews Bay met in Panama City to select a name for a proposed new county. The name Bay was selected because it was satisfactory to the majority of the citizens and descriptive of the territory that would be included. On July 1, 1913, the Legislature created Bay County from portions of Washington, Calhoun and Walton counties.

Panama City was where Gideon v. Wainwright, a 1963 US Supreme Court decision that gave all persons accused of a crime the right to an attorney paid for by the government, originated.

== Geography ==
According to the U.S. Census Bureau, the county has a total area of 1,467 square miles (3,800 km^{2}), of which 759 square miles (1,970 km^{2}) is land and 708 square miles (1,830 km^{2}) is water.

Bay County is included in the Panama City, Florida metropolitan area along with Washington County.

=== Adjacent counties ===
- Washington County - north
- Jackson County - northeast
- Calhoun County - east
- Gulf County - southeast
- Walton County - west

=== National protected area ===
- Apalachicola National Forest (part)

== Demographics ==
Historical population
Census	Pop.	Note	%±
1920	11,407		—
1930	12,091		6.0%
1940	20,686		71.1%
1950	42,689		106.4%
1960	67,131		57.3%
1970	75,283		12.1%
1980	97,740		29.8%
1990	126,994		29.9%
2000	148,217		16.7%
2010	168,852		13.9%
2020	175,216		3.8%
2025 (est.)	204,479	▲	16.7%
U.S. Decennial Census; 1790-1960 1900-1990; 1990-2000 2010-2020 2020

=== Racial and ethnic composition ===
Bay County, Florida – Racial and ethnic composition Note: the US Census treats Hispanic/Latino as an ethnic category. This table excludes Latinos from the racial categories and assigns them to a separate category. Hispanics/Latinos may be of any race.
Race / Ethnicity (NH = Non-Hispanic)	Pop 1980	Pop 1990	Pop 2000	Pop 2010	Pop 2020	% 1980	% 1990	% 2000	% 2010	% 2020
White alone (NH)	82,901	108,004	122,708	133,790	128,348	84.82%	85.05%	82.79%	79.24%	73.25%
Black or African American alone (NH)	11,578	13,612	15,526	17,844	17,549	11.85%	10.72%	10.48%	10.57%	10.02%
Native American or Alaska Native alone (NH)	423	903	1,096	1,033	795	0.43%	0.71%	0.74%	0.61%	0.45%
Asian alone (NH)	1,065	2,165	2,534	3,298	4,068	1.09%	1.70%	1.71%	1.95%	2.32%
Native Hawaiian or Pacific Islander alone (NH)	x	x	111	140	194	x	x	0.07%	0.08%	0.11%
Other race alone (NH)	236	54	164	223	720	0.24%	0.04%	0.11%	0.13%	0.41%
Mixed race or Multiracial (NH)	x	x	2,487	4,417	9,696	x	x	1.68%	2.62%	5.53%
Hispanic or Latino (any race)	1,537	2,256	3,591	8,107	13,846	1.57%	1.78%	2.42%	4.80%	7.90%
Total	97,740	126,994	148,217	168,852	175,216	100.00%	100.00%	100.00%	100.00%	100.00%

A map of the racial demographics of Bay County, Florida by Census tract. Legend: Non-Hispanic White 40–50% 50–60% 60–70% 70–80% 80–90% >90% Black or African American 50–60%

=== 2020 census ===
As of the 2020 census, the county had a population of 175,216, 70,134 households, and 47,432 families. The median age was 42.3 years. 20.3% of residents were under the age of 18 and 18.5% of residents were 65 years of age or older. For every 100 females there were 98.9 males, and for every 100 females age 18 and over there were 97.6 males age 18 and over.

Of those households, 27.9% had children under the age of 18 living in them, 46.6% were married-couple households, 19.4% were households with a male householder and no spouse or partner present, and 26.1% were households with a female householder and no spouse or partner present. About 26.6% of all households were made up of individuals and 10.5% had someone living alone who was 65 years of age or older.

There were 102,971 housing units, of which 31.9% were vacant. Among occupied housing units, 67.4% were owner-occupied and 32.6% were renter-occupied. The homeowner vacancy rate was 2.7% and the rental vacancy rate was 15.4%.

The racial makeup of the county was 74.9% White, 10.2% Black or African American, 0.6% American Indian and Alaska Native, 2.4% Asian, 0.1% Native Hawaiian and Pacific Islander, 3.1% from some other race, and 8.7% from two or more races. Hispanic or Latino residents of any race comprised 7.9% of the population.

85.8% of residents lived in urban areas, while 14.2% lived in rural areas.

=== 2000 census ===
As of the census of 2000, there were 148,217 people, 59,597 households, and 40,466 families residing in the county. The population density was 194 people per square mile (75 people/km^{2}). There were 78,435 housing units at an average density of 103 per square mile (40/km^{2}). The racial makeup of the county was 84.17% White, 10.64% Black or African American, 0.78% Native American, 1.73% Asian, 0.08% Pacific Islander, 0.66% from other races, and 1.94% from two or more races. 2.42% of the population were Hispanic or Latino of any race.

There were 59,597 households, out of which 30.60% had children under the age of 18 living with them, 52.00% were married couples living together, 12.00% had a female householder with no husband present, and 32.10% were non-families. 26.00% of all households were made up of individuals, and 8.80% had someone living alone who was 65 years of age or older. The average household size was 2.43 and the average family size was 2.92.

In the county, the population was spread out, with 24.00% under the age of 18, 8.70% from 18 to 24, 30.20% from 25 to 44, 23.70% from 45 to 64, and 13.40% who were 65 years of age or older. The median age was 37 years. For every 100 females there were 98.10 males. For every 100 females age 18 and over, there were 95.80 males.

The median income for a household in the county was $36,092, and the median income for a family was $42,729. Males had a median income of $30,116 versus $21,676 for females. The per capita income for the county was $18,700. About 9.80% of families and 13.00% of the population were below the poverty line, including 18.30% of those under age 18 and 11.00% of those age 65 or over.

== Government ==
As required by the Florida Constitution, Bay County elects the constitutional officers of sheriff, tax collector, property appraiser, supervisor of elections, and clerk of the circuit court. It is also one of the thirty-eight counties in which the superintendent of schools is elected. There are five members of the county commission, each of whom is elected from a district.

=== Countywide Officials ===
Bay County elected officials
Office	Officeholder	Party	Current term ends
Sheriff	Tommy Ford	Republican	2028
Clerk of the Court and Comptroller	Bill Kinsaul	Republican	2028
Property Appraiser	Dan Sowell	Republican	2028
Supervisor of Elections	Nina Ward	Republican	2028
Tax Collector	Chuck Perdue	Republican	2028
Superintendent of Schools	Mark McQueen	Republican	2028

=== County Commission ===
Bay County Board of County Commissioners
District	Commissioner	Party	Current term ends
1	Daniel Raffield	Republican	2028
2	Robert Carroll	Republican	2026
3	Doug Crosby	Republican	2028
4	Doug Moore	Republican	2026
5	Clair Pease	Republican	2028

== Politics ==
Bay County is highly conservative, along with the Florida panhandle as a whole. The Republican presidential candidate has carried the county in every election since 1976, often by large margins.

For elections to the Florida state senate, Bay County is part of District 2.

For elections to the Florida House of Representatives, Bay County makes up District 6.

=== Voter registration ===
According to the Secretary of State's office, Republicans are a majority of the registered voters in Bay County.

Bay County Voter Registration & Party Enrollment as of March 31, 2022
Political Party	Total Voters	Percentage
Republican	66,358	53.51%
Democratic	27,605	22.26%
Independent	27,524	22.20%
Other Parties	2,508	2.02%
Total	123,995	100%

=== Statewide elections ===
United States presidential election results for Bay County, Florida
Year	Republican		Democratic		Third party(ies)	
Year	No.	%	No.	%	No.	%
1916	279	23.64%	725	61.44%	176	14.92%
1920	551	36.98%	818	54.90%	121	8.12%
1924	318	25.48%	838	67.15%	92	7.37%
1928	974	44.27%	1,190	54.09%	36	1.64%
1932	429	13.75%	2,692	86.25%	0	0.00%
1936	541	14.45%	3,202	85.55%	0	0.00%
1940	684	11.72%	5,153	88.28%	0	0.00%
1944	1,126	15.13%	6,317	84.87%	0	0.00%
1948	928	12.69%	5,168	70.68%	1,216	16.63%
1952	4,812	35.38%	8,789	64.62%	0	0.00%
1956	4,971	36.51%	8,645	63.49%	0	0.00%
1960	5,435	33.94%	10,579	66.06%	0	0.00%
1964	12,849	62.09%	7,846	37.91%	0	0.00%
1968	5,121	21.07%	4,020	16.54%	15,161	62.39%
1972	20,245	83.80%	3,914	16.20%	0	0.00%
1976	14,208	48.19%	14,858	50.39%	418	1.42%
1980	20,948	60.61%	12,389	35.85%	1,224	3.54%
1984	29,356	75.77%	9,384	24.22%	4	0.01%
1988	31,796	72.51%	11,603	26.46%	452	1.03%
1992	22,842	49.99%	12,846	28.12%	10,001	21.89%
1996	28,365	54.87%	17,068	33.02%	6,261	12.11%
2000	38,682	65.70%	18,873	32.06%	1,321	2.24%
2004	53,404	71.18%	21,068	28.08%	552	0.74%
2008	56,683	69.66%	23,653	29.07%	1,030	1.27%
2012	56,876	71.01%	22,051	27.53%	1,174	1.47%
2016	62,194	70.50%	21,797	24.71%	4,231	4.80%
2020	66,097	70.91%	25,614	27.48%	1,502	1.61%
2024	71,497	72.84%	25,201	25.67%	1,459	1.49%

United States Senate election results for Bay County, Florida1
Year	Republican		Democratic		Third party(ies)	
Year	No.	%	No.	%	No.	%
2024	72,045	74.22%	22,988	23.68%	2,032	2.09%

United States Senate election results for Bay County, Florida3
Year	Republican		Democratic		Third party(ies)	
Year	No.	%	No.	%	No.	%
2022	51,657	77.15%	14,547	21.73%	752	1.12%

Florida Gubernatorial election results for Bay County
Year	Republican		Democratic		Third party(ies)	
Year	No.	%	No.	%	No.	%
1994	23,498	56.87%	17,816	43.12%	2	0.00%
1998	26,759	69.01%	12,017	30.99%	2	0.01%
2002	34,107	70.02%	14,258	29.27%	344	0.71%
2006	31,382	65.26%	14,802	30.78%	1,907	3.97%
2010	36,512	66.39%	15,689	28.53%	2,796	5.08%
2014	40,956	71.79%	12,990	22.77%	3,104	5.44%
2018	45,709	72.17%	16,757	26.46%	865	1.37%
2022	52,590	78.38%	14,091	21.00%	412	0.61%

== Education ==
Bay District Schools operates public schools serving all portions of the county except Mexico Beach, which is served by Gulf County Schools.

=== Schools in Bay County ===
==== Pre-K – 12 schools ====
Deane Bozeman School

North Bay Haven Charter Academy

Palm Bay Preparatory Academy

Rising Leaders Academy

==== PreK-8 Schools ====
Breakfast Point Academy

Bay Haven Charter Academy

Tyndall Academy

University Academy

==== High schools ====
- Zoned

J. R. Arnold High School (Panama City Beach)

Bay High School (Panama City)

A. Crawford Mosley High School (Lynn Haven)

Rutherford High School (Springfield)

- Special Purpose

A.D. Harris High School (Panama City)

Haney Technical High School (Panama City)

New Horizons Learning Center (Lynn Haven)

Rosenwald High School (Panama City)

==== Middle schools ====
Jinks Middle School

Merritt Brown Middle School

Mowat Middle School

Surfside Middle School (Panama City Beach)

==== Elementary schools ====
A. Gary Walsingham Academy Covenant Christian School Callaway Elementary School

Cedar Grove Elementary School

Deer Point Elementary School

Hiland Park Elementary School

Hutchison Beach Elementary School (Panama City Beach)

Lucille Moore Elementary School

Lynn Haven Elementary School

M. Cherry Street Elementary School

Millville Elementary School

Northside Elementary School

Oakland Terrace Elementary School

Parker Elementary School

Patronis Elementary School (Panama City Beach)

Patterson Elementary School

Southport Elementary School

St. Andrew Elementary School

Tommy Smith Elementary School

Tyndall Elementary School

Waller Elementary School

West Bay Elementary School

== Public transportation ==
=== Major highways ===
Bay County does not have any interstate connections; the nearest connection is with I-10 at US-231 near Cottondale.

- US 98
- US 231
- SR 20
- SR 22
- SR 30
- SR 30A
- SR 77
- SR 79
- SR 368
- SR 388
- SR 389
- SR 390
- SR 391

=== Airports ===
The Northwest Florida Beaches International Airport opened for commercial flights in 2010. It connects the region to several major airports in the South and Midwest.

=== Public surface transportation ===
The county operates the Bayway (formerly Bay Town Trolley), which runs several routes in and around Panama City. The county also have a greyhound in Panama City.

== Library ==
Bay County is part of the Northwest Regional Library System (NWRLS), which also serves Gulf and Liberty Counties. The Bay County Public Library is the headquarters library for the system. The Bay County Board of Commissioners is the system's governing authority and single administrative unit.

Locations:

- Bay County Public Library
- Panama City Beach Public Library
- Parker Public Library
- Springfield Public Library
- Gulf County Public Library
- Charles Whitehead Public Library
- Harrell Memorial Library of Liberty County
- Jimmy Weaver Memorial Library
- Bay County Law Library (at the Bay County Public Library)

== Communities ==
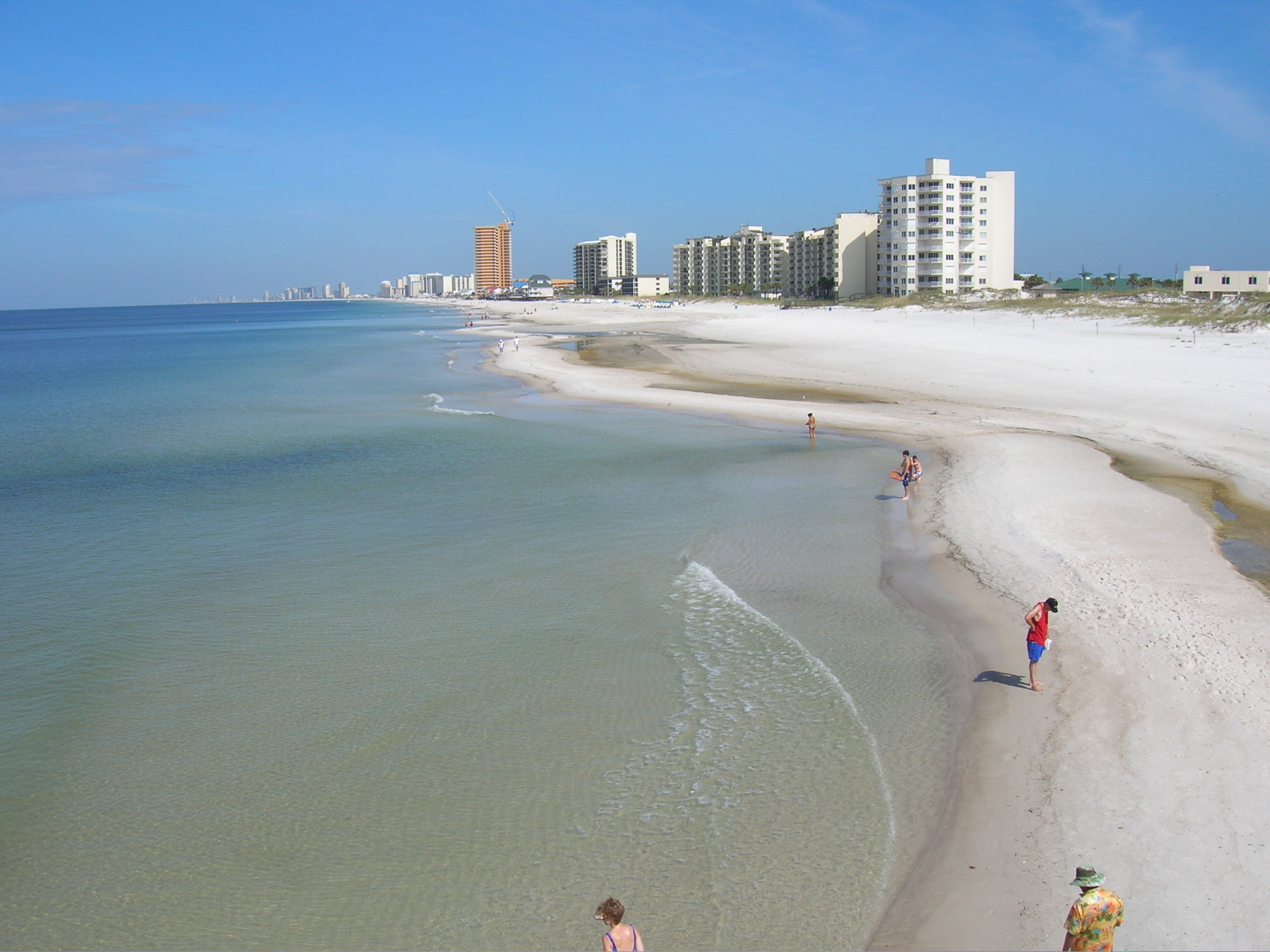
Panama City Beach

=== Cities ===
- Callaway
- Lynn Haven
- Mexico Beach
- Panama City
- Panama City Beach
- Parker
- Springfield

=== Census-designated places ===
- Cedar Grove
- Laguna Beach
- Lower Grand Lagoon
- Pretty Bayou
- Tyndall AFB
- Upper Grand Lagoon

=== Unincorporated communities ===
- Bayou George
- Cedar Grove
- Fountain
- Glenwood
- Millville
- Sand Hills
- Santa Monica
- Southport
- Sunnyside
- Vicksburg
- Youngstown

=== Former Census-designated places ===
- Hiland Park

== See also ==
- National Register of Historic Places listings in Bay County, Florida
