= 1924 Republican Party presidential primaries =

Selection of Republican US presidential candidate

- February 12 to June 7, 1924

1,109 delegates to the 1924 Republican National Convention 555 (majority) votes needed to win

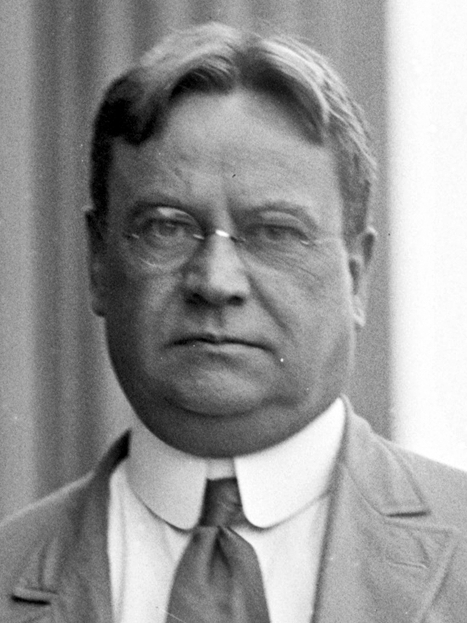
Candidate	Calvin Coolidge	Robert M. La Follette	Hiram Johnson
Home state	Massachusetts	Wisconsin	California
Delegate count	685	34	14
Contests won	15	1	1
Popular vote	2,410,363	82,492	1,007,833
Percentage	68.4%	2.3%	28.6%
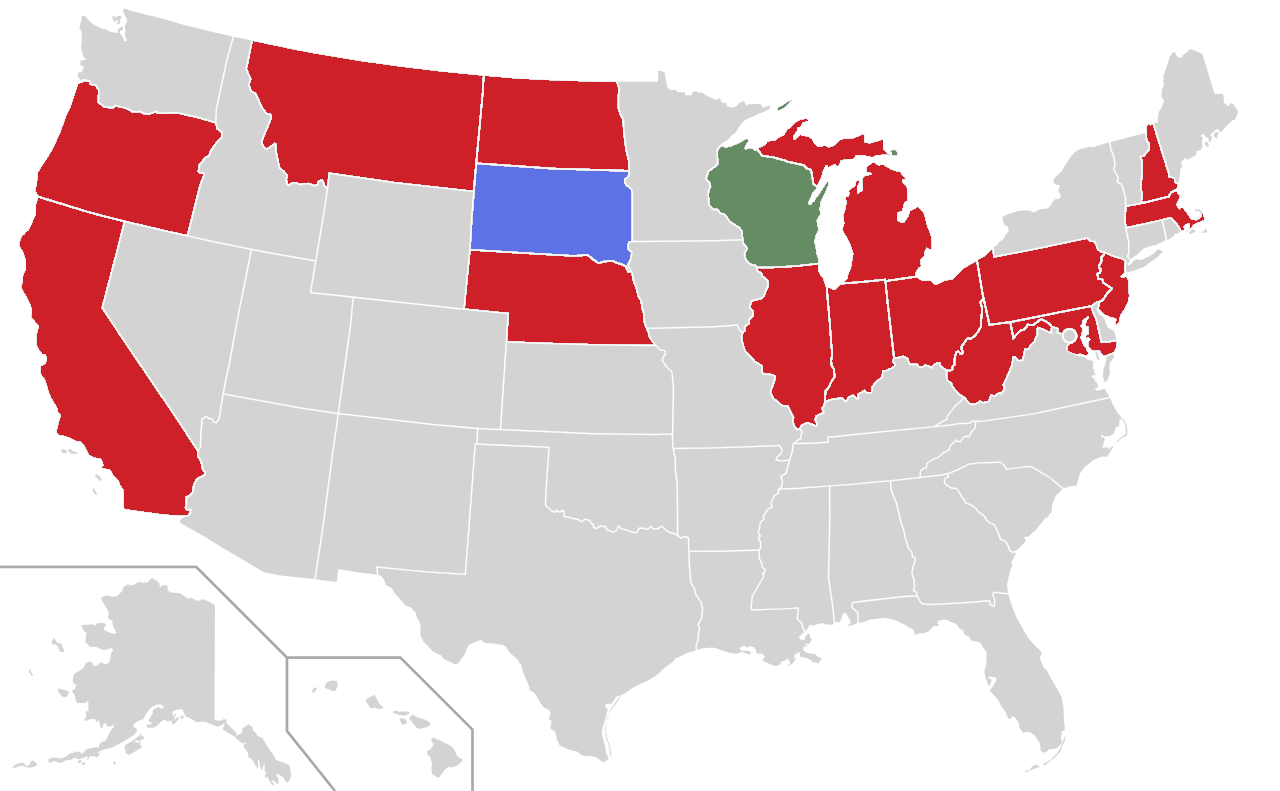
- First place finishes by preference primary results
Previous Republican nominee
Warren G. Harding
Republican nominee
Calvin Coolidge

From February 12 to June 7, 1924, voters of the Republican Party chose its nominee for president in the 1924 United States presidential election. Only 17 states held Republican primaries that year, with most states selecting Convention delegates through caucuses and state-level conventions. Delegates chosen through the primary process (in those states that held primary elections) attended the 1924 Republican National Convention held from June 10 to June 12, 1924, in Cleveland, Ohio.

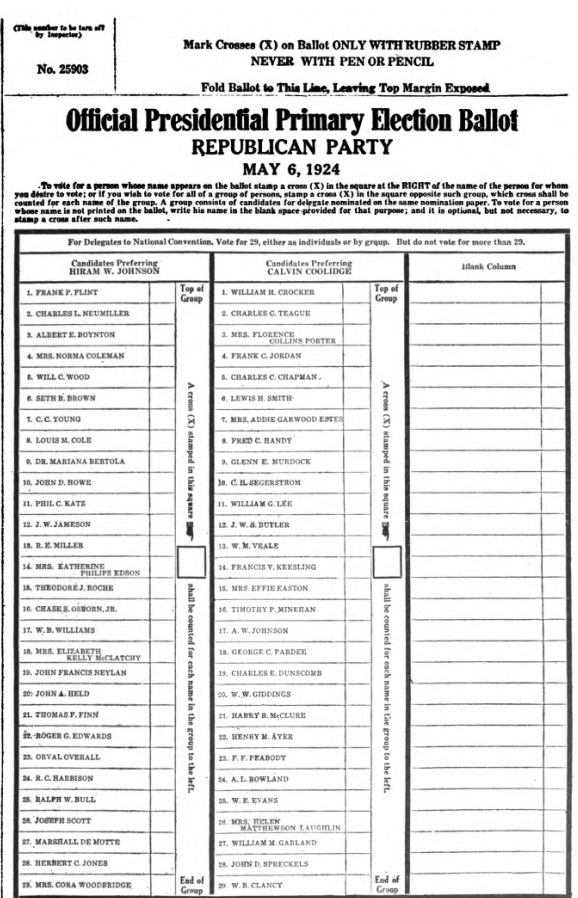
Primary ballot in California

== Schedule and results ==
Date	Total pledged delegates	Contest and total popular vote	Delegates won and popular vote			
Date	Total pledged delegates	Contest and total popular vote	Calvin Coolidge	Hiram Johnson	Robert M. La Follette	Other / Unpledged
February 12	26	Kentucky convention	26	—	—	—
February 12	11	South Carolina convention	11	—	—	—
February 21	2	Philippines convention	2	—	—	—
March 4	29	Iowa convention	29	—	—	—
March 8	27	Minnesota convention	27	—	—	—
March 11	15	Colorado convention	15	—	—	—
March 11	11	New Hampshire ?	11; 13,445	-	-	9,252 (Note: Represents votes for U.S. senator George Moses, who ran despite supporting Coolidge.)
March 18	13	North Dakota; 125,430	13 (Note: Although six of the elected delegates were La Follette supporters, delegates were required by state law to support the winner of the preference primary, Coolidge, so long as there was a possibility of his nomination.); 52,815 (42.1%)	32,363 (25.8%)	40,252 (32.1%)	-
March 19	24	North Carolina convention	24	—	—	—
March 25	11	Idaho convention	11	—	—	—
March 25	13	South Dakota; 80,726	39,791 (49.3%)	13; 40,935 (50.7%)	-	-
April 1	0	Wisconsin; 65,161	23,324 (35.8%)	411 (0.6%)	40,738 (62.5%)	688 (1.1%)
April 1	29	Wisconsin ?	1; 100,295	-	28; 200,822	-
April 3	17	Connecticut convention	-	-	-	17 (Note: While favorable to Coolidge, these delegates were not instructed to vote for him.)
April 3	15	Maine convention	15 (Note: These delegates were "Soft-Pledged"; while favorable to Coolidge, they were not instructed to vote for him.)	—	—	—
April 5	17	Washington convention	17	—	—	—
April 7	33	Michigan; 351,242	33; 236,191 (67.3%)	103,739 (29.5%)	-	11,312 (Note: Includes 10,268 votes for William Simpson.) (3.2%)
April 8	2	Hawaii convention	-	-	-	2 (Note: While favorable to Coolidge, these delegates were not instructed.)
April 8	0 (of 61)	Illinois; 919,082	533,193 (58.0%)	385,590 (41.9%)	278 (0.0%)	21 (0.0%)
April 8	61	Illinois	24	1	-	36 (Note: Representing the Illinois "Regulars", essentially the Illinois Republican Party, who were unpledged.)
April 8	19	Nebraska; 125,335	19; 79,676 (63.6%)	45,032 (35.9%)	-	627 (0.5%)
April 16	91	New York convention	-	-	-	91 (Note: While favorable to Coolidge, these delegates were not instructed to vote for him.)
April 17	10	Florida convention	10	—	—	—
April 22	79	Pennsylvania; 133,354	79; 117,262 (87.9%)	4,345 (3.3%)	1,224 (0.9%)	10,523 (Note: Includes 5,692 votes for Gifford Pinchot.) (7.9%)
April 22	31	New Jersey; 125,375	31; 117,262 (89.1%)	13,626 (10.9%)	-	10 (0.0%)
April 23	25	Oklahoma convention	25	—	—	—
April 28	9	Arizona convention	9	—	—	—
April 29	39	Massachusetts; 84,840	39; 84,840 (100.0%)	—	—	—
April 29	0	Ohio; 201,243	173,613 (86.3%)	27,578 (13.7%)	-	-
April 29	51	Ohio ?	51; 146,524	32,198	-	-
May 5	19	Maryland; 20,986	19; 19,657 (93.7%)	3 (0.0%)	-	1,326 (6.3%)
May 6 (62)	29	California; 574,325	29; 311,826 (54.3%)	262,499 (45.7%)	-	-
May 6 (62)	33	Indiana; 392,648	33; 330,045 (84.1%)	62,603 (15.9%)	-	-
May 10	9	Nevada convention	9	—	—	—
May 13	9	Wyoming convention	9	—	—	—
May 16	13	Oregon; 129,229	13; 99,187 (76.8%)	30,042 (23.2%)	-	-
May 27	23	Texas convention	23	—	—	—
May 27	19	West Virginia; 162,042	19; 162,042 (100.0%)	—	—	—
May 28	11	Montana; 19,200	11; 19,200 (100.0%)	—	—	—
Total 875 pledged delegates 3,527,388 votes			685 2,296,832 (65.1%)	14 1,008,766 (28.6%)	34 82,492 (2.3%)	146 24,507 (0.7%)

== See also ==
- 1924 Democratic Party presidential primaries
