= Pretty Bayou, Florida =

- Census-designated place
- Interactive map outlining Pretty Bayou
- Coordinates: 30°11′51″N 85°41′52″W
- Country: United States
- State: Florida
- County: Bay

Area
  - Total: 1.77 sq mi (4.58 km^{2})
  - Land: 1.62 sq mi (4.19 km^{2})
  - Water: 0.15 sq mi (0.40 km^{2})
- Elevation: 13 ft (4.0 m)

Population (2020)
  - Total: 2,911
  - Density: 1,800.2/sq mi (695.05/km^{2})
- Time zone: UTC-6 (Central (CST))
  - Summer (DST): UTC-5 (CDT)
- ZIP code: 32405
- Area code: 850
- FIPS code: 12-58962
- GNIS feature ID: 2403446

Pretty Bayou is a census-designated place (CDP) in Bay County, Florida, United States. The population was 2,911 at the 2020 census, down from 3,206 at the 2010 census. It is part of the Panama City–Panama City Beach, Florida Metropolitan Statistical Area. In 2018, Hurricane Michael caused significant damage to the city.

== Geography ==
According to the United States Census Bureau, the Pretty Bayou CDP has a total area of 1.9 square miles (4.8 km^{2}), of which 1.7 square miles (4.4 km^{2}) is land and 0.15 square miles (0.4 km^{2}), or 8.26%, is water.

== Demographics ==
Historical population
Census	Pop.	Note	%±
1980	3,340		—
1990	3,839		14.9%
2000	3,519		−8.3%
2010	3,206		−8.9%
2020	2,911		−9.2%

=== 2020 census ===
As of the 2020 census, Pretty Bayou had a population of 2,911. The median age was 48.4 years. 18.9% of residents were under the age of 18 and 24.1% of residents were 65 years of age or older. For every 100 females there were 103.4 males, and for every 100 females age 18 and over there were 101.5 males age 18 and over.

100.0% of residents lived in urban areas, while 0.0% lived in rural areas.

There were 1,208 households in Pretty Bayou, of which 25.2% had children under the age of 18 living in them. Of all households, 53.1% were married-couple households, 17.9% were households with a male householder and no spouse or partner present, and 20.4% were households with a female householder and no spouse or partner present. About 24.9% of all households were made up of individuals and 12.8% had someone living alone who was 65 years of age or older.

There were 1,374 housing units, of which 12.1% were vacant. The homeowner vacancy rate was 2.9% and the rental vacancy rate was 9.4%.

Racial composition as of the 2020 census
Race	Number	Percent
White	2,414	82.9%
Black or African American	118	4.1%
American Indian and Alaska Native	18	0.6%
Asian	78	2.7%
Native Hawaiian and Other Pacific Islander	0	0.0%
Some other race	59	2.0%
Two or more races	224	7.7%
Hispanic or Latino (of any race)	195	6.7%

=== 2010 census ===
As of the 2010 census, there were 3,206 people, 1,310 households, and 921 families residing in the CDP. The population density was 1,885.9 inhabitants per square mile (728.2/km^{2}). There were 1,488 housing units at an average density of 875.3 per square mile (338.0/km^{2}). The racial makeup of the CDP was 91.5% White, 3.1% African American, 0.4% American Indian or Alaska Native, 1.8% Asian, 0.8% some other race, and 2.2% from two or more races. Hispanic or Latino of any race were 3.3% of the population.

There were 1,310 households, out of which 21.3% had children under the age of 18 living with them, 57.3% were headed by married couples living together, 8.7% had a female householder with no husband present, and 29.7% were non-families. 24.0% of all households were made up of individuals, and 10.6% were someone living alone who was 65 years of age or older. The average household size was 2.36, and the average family size was 2.77.

In the CDP, the population was spread out, with 17.5% under the age of 18, 6.0% from 18 to 24, 19.5% from 25 to 44, 31.6% from 45 to 64, and 25.3% who were 65 years of age or older. The median age was 49.7 years. For every 100 females, there were 98.5 males. For every 100 females age 18 and over, there were 93.4 males.

=== 2000 census ===
At the 2000 census, the median income for a household in the CDP was $48,347, and the median income for a family was $56,856. Males had a median income of $39,261 versus $29,185 for females. The per capita income for the CDP was $26,930. About 4.0% of families and 6.0% of the population were below the poverty line, including 5.5% of those under age 18 and 4.6% of those age 65 or over.
