= 1924 Democratic Party presidential primaries =

- March 12 to June 7, 1924

1,096 delegates to the 1924 Democratic National Convention 729 (two-thirds) votes needed to win
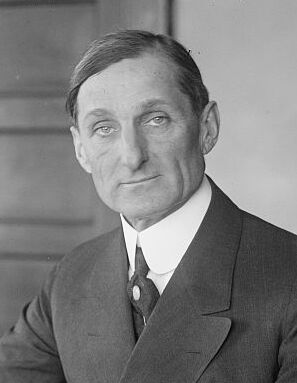

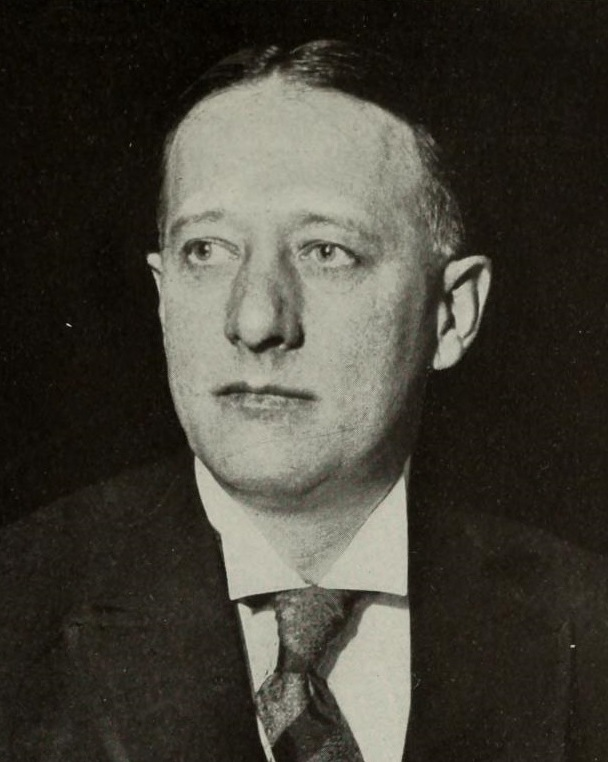

Candidate	William Gibbs McAdoo	Al Smith	John W. Davis
Home state	California	New York	West Virginia
Delegate count	431.5	241	31
Contests won	21	8	1
Popular vote	456,733	—	—
Percentage	59.8%	—	—
- First place by convention roll call McAdoo Smith Davis; Underwood Harrison Brown Various
Previous Democratic nominee
James M. Cox
Democratic nominee
John W. Davis

From March 12 to June 7, 1924, voters and members of the Democratic Party elected delegates to the 1924 Democratic National Convention, in part to nominate a candidate for President of the United States in the 1924 election.

Though William Gibbs McAdoo won a vast majority of states, and almost three-fifths of the popular vote, in those twelve states that held primary elections, it meant little to his performance nationwide. Many of the delegations from states that did not hold primary elections favored his main rivals, Oscar Underwood of Alabama and Al Smith of New York, neither of whom won any primary elections. As well as the primaries that McAdoo did not win were won by "local sons" who stood no chance of winning the nomination, or in some cases were not even formal candidates. Once at the convention, the party was deadlocked for 102 straight ballots, before dark horse candidate John W. Davis, (who was not a formal candidate when he arrived at the convention) was chosen on the 103rd ballot. Davis went on to lose the election to Republican candidate Calvin Coolidge.

== Background ==
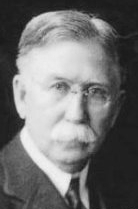
Oil tycoon Edward Laurence Doheny

Sizable Democratic gains during the 1922 Midterm elections suggested to many Democrats that the nadir that they experienced immediately after the 1920 elections was ending, and that a popular candidate like William Gibbs McAdoo of California, who could draw the popular support of labor and Wilsonians, would stand an excellent chance of winning the coming presidential election. The Teapot Dome scandal added yet even more enthusiasm for the party initially, but further disclosures revealed that the corrupt interests had been bipartisan. Edward Doheny for example, whose name had become synonymous with that of the Teapot Dome scandal, ranked highly in the Democratic Party of California, contributed highly to party campaigns, served as chairman of the state party, and was even at one point advanced as a possible candidate for vice-president in 1920. The death of Warren Harding in August 1923 and the succession of Coolidge blunted the effects of the scandals upon the Republican Party, including that of Teapot Dome, but until the convention many Democrats believed that the Republicans would be turned out of the White House.

The concept of a primary election in which any registered party member would vote for a candidate, was relatively new in the American political landscape and been introduced for presidential delegates in 1912. In only 12 states were actual primaries held, and even in them, the results were not universally binding for the delegates to the Democratic National Convention, where the presidential candidate would be formally chosen. In most of the country, the selection of delegates was confined to state-level conventions and caucuses under the heavy hand of local political machines.

== Candidates ==
There were four candidates:

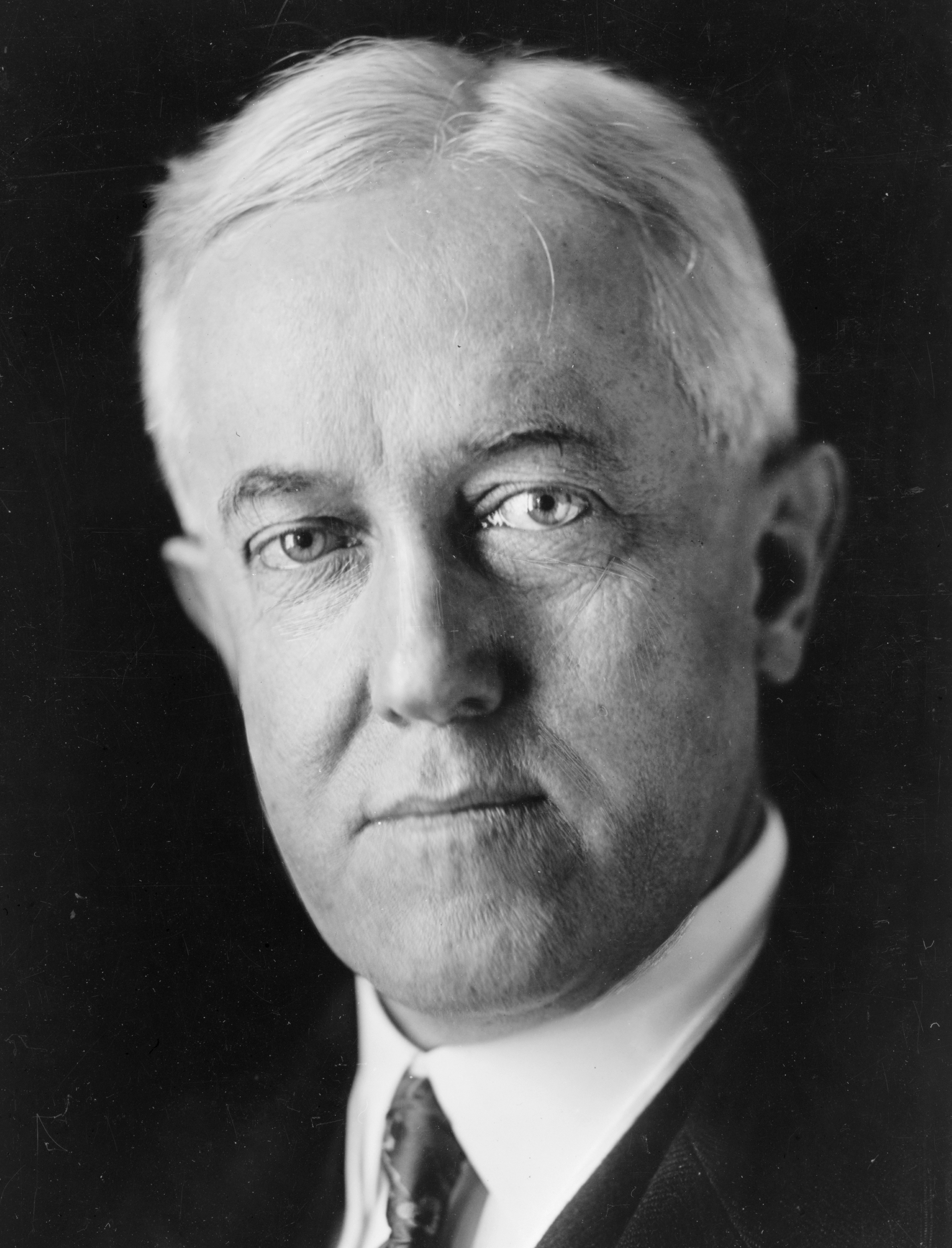
Former Ambassador
to the United Kingdom
John W. Davis
of West Virginia

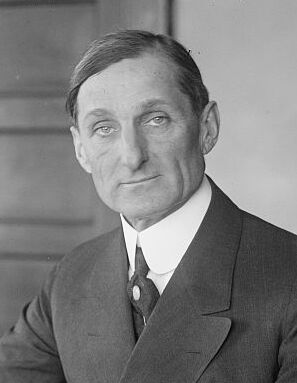
Former Secretary
of the Treasury
William Gibbs McAdoo
of California

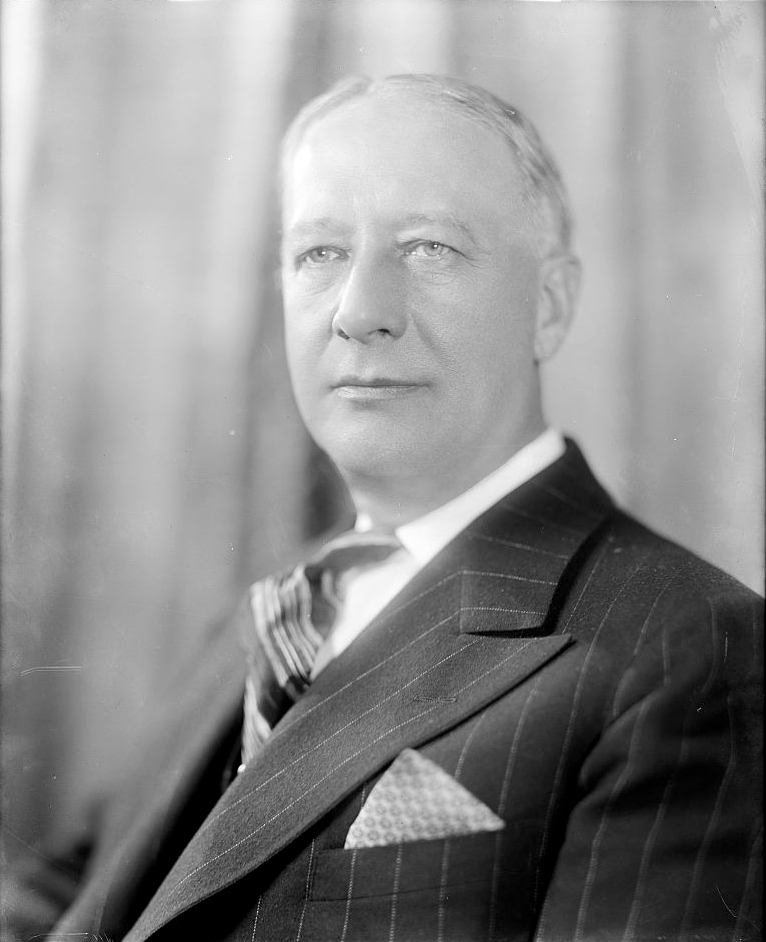
Governor
Al Smith
of New York
(campaign)

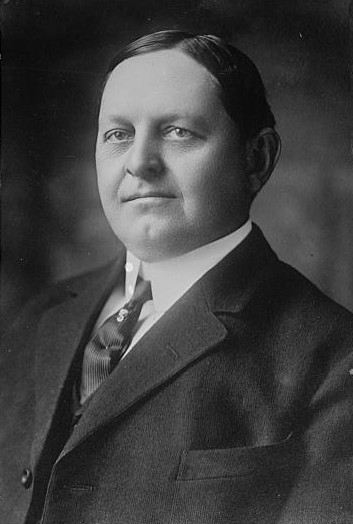
Senator
Oscar Underwood
of Alabama

== McAdoo, the frontrunner ==
The party's immediate leading candidate was the former Secretary of the Treasury, William Gibbs McAdoo, who was extremely popular with labor due to his wartime record as Director General of Railroads, and was, as former president Woodrow Wilson's son-in-law, also the favorite of the Wilsonians. However, in January 1924, unearthed evidence of his relationship with Edward L. Doheny, who had been implicated in the Teapot Dome scandal, discomforted many of his supporters. After McAdoo had resigned from the Wilson administration in 1918, Joseph Tumulty, Wilson's secretary, had warned him to avoid association with Doheny. However, in 1919, McAdoo took Doheny as a client for an unusually large initial fee of $100,000 ($1,687,908 in 2022) addition to an annual retainer. Not the least perplexing part of the deal involved a million dollar bonus for McAdoo if the Mexican government reached a satisfactory agreement with Washington on oil lands Doheny held south of the Texas border. The bonus was never paid, and McAdoo later insisted that it was a casual figure of speech mentioned in jest. At the time, however, he had telegraphed the New York World that he would have received "an additional fee of $900,000 [($17,510,177 in 2022)] if my firm had succeeded in getting a satisfactory settlement" since the Doheny companies had "several hundred million dollars of property at stake, our services, had they been effective, would have been rightly compensated by the additional fee." In fact, the lawyer received only $50,000 ($972,788 in 2022) more from Doheny.

It was also charged that on matters of interest to his client, Republic Iron and Steel, from which he received $150,000 ($2,918,363 in 2022 dollars), McAdoo neglected the regular channels dictated by propriety and consulted directly with his own appointees in the capital to obtain a fat refund.

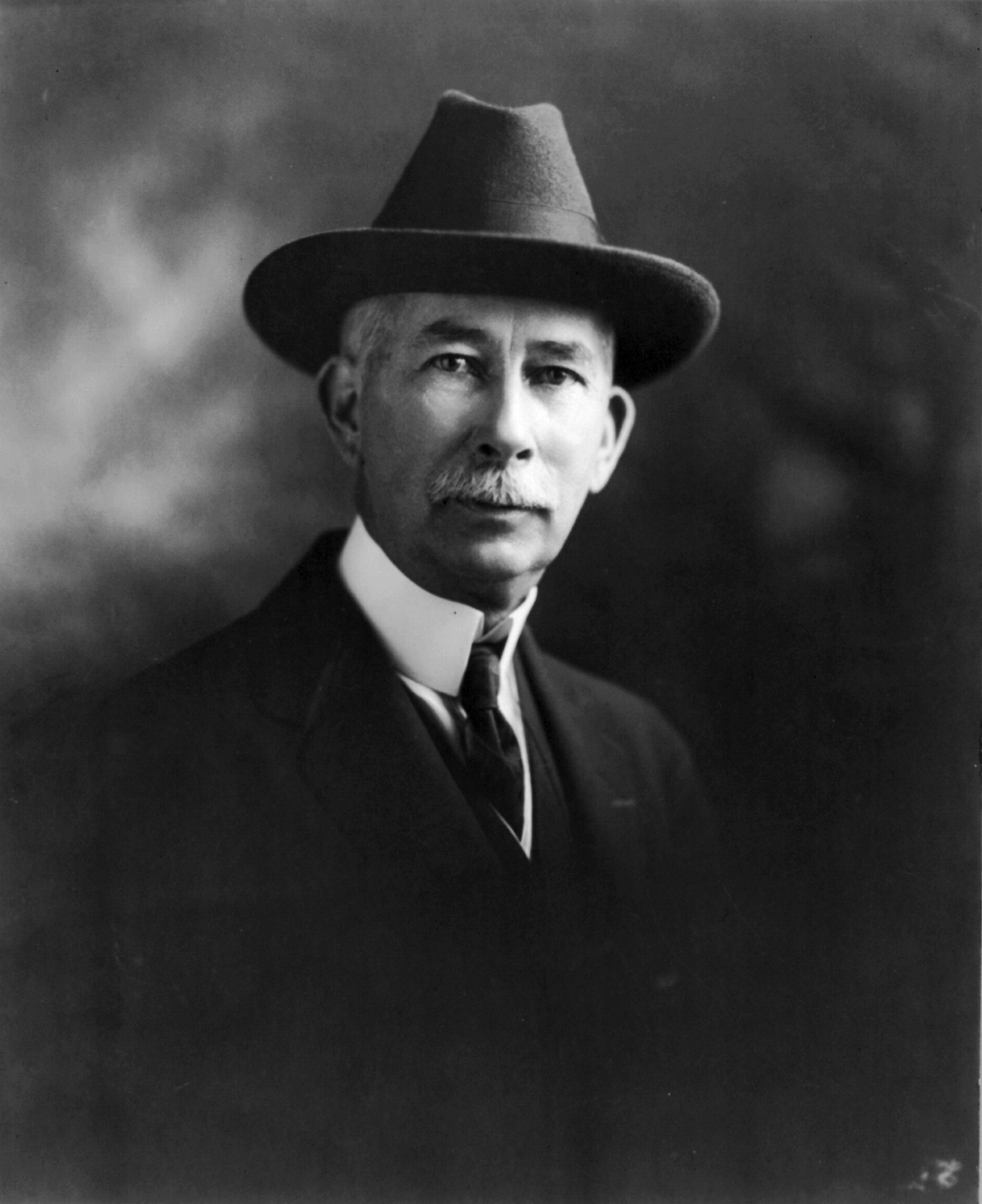
Edward Mandell "Colonel" House

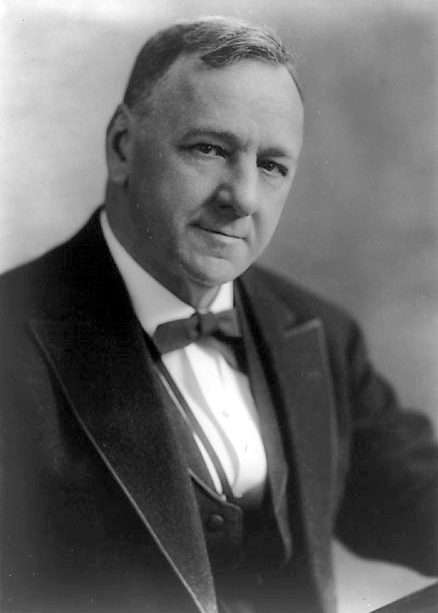
Josephus Daniels

McAdoo's connection to Doheny appeared to lessen his desirability seriously as a presidential candidate. In February, Colonel Edward M. House urged him to withdraw from the race, as did Josephus Daniels, Thomas Bell Love, and two important contributors to the Democratic party, Bernard Baruch and Thomas Chadbourne. Some advisers hoped that McAdoo's chances would improve after a formal withdrawal. William Jennings Bryan, who never doubted McAdoo's honesty, thought that the Doheny affair had damaged the lawyer's chances "seriously, if not fatally." Senator Thomas Walsh, who earlier had called McAdoo the greatest Secretary of the Treasury since Alexander Hamilton, informed him with customary curtness: "You are no longer available as a candidate." Breckinridge Long, who would be McAdoo's floor manager at the June convention, wrote in his diary on February 13: "As it stands today we are beat." The New York Times, itself convinced that McAdoo had acted in bad taste and against the spirit of the law, report the widespread opinion that McAdoo had "been eliminated as a formidable contender for Democratic nomination."

McAdoo was unpopular for reasons other than his close association with Doheny. Even in 1918, The Nation was saying that "his election to the White House would be an unqualified misfortune." McAdoo, the liberal journal then believed, had wanted to go to war with Mexico and Germany and he was held responsible for segregating clerks in the Treasury Department. Walter Lippmann wrote in 1920 that McAdoo "is not fundamentally moved by the simple moralities" and that his "honest" liberalism catered only to popular feeling. Liberal critics, believing him a demagogue, gave as evidence his stand for quick payment of the veterans' bonus.

=== Relations with the Klan ===
Much of the dissatisfaction with McAdoo on the part of reformers and urban Democrats sprang from his acceptance of the backing of the Ku Klux Klan. James Cox, the 1920 Democratic nominee, indignantly wrote that "there was not only tacit consent to the Klan's support, but it was apparent that he and his major supporters were conniving with the Klan." Friends insisted that McAdoo's silence on the matter hid a distaste that the political facts of life kept him from expressing, especially after the Doheny scandal when he desperately needed support. Thomas Bell Love of Texas, though at one time of a contrary opinion, advised McAdoo not to issue even a mild disclaimer of the Klan. To Bernard Baruch and others, McAdoo explained as a disavowal of the Klan his remarks against prejudice at a 1923 college commencement. However, McAdoo could not command the support of unsatisfied liberal spokesmen for The Nation and The New Republic, which favored the candidacy of the Republican Senator Robert LaFollette. A further blow to McAdoo was the death on February 3, 1924, of Wilson, who had ironically outlived his successor in the White House. Father-in-law to the candidate, Wilson might have given McAdoo a welcome endorsement now that the League of Nations had receded as an issue.

William Dodd of the University of Chicago wrote to his father that Wilson had been "counting on" his daughter's being in the White House. The New York Times, however, reported a rumor that Wilson had written to Cox hoping he would again be a candidate in 1924.

=== McAdoo vs. Underwood ===
Those handicaps did not deter McAdoo from campaigning vigorously and effectively in presidential primaries. He won easily against minor candidates, whose success might have denied him key delegations in the South and the West, but Senator Oscar Underwood of Alabama was no match for McAdoo. Opposed to Prohibition and to the Klan, Underwood failed to identify himself with the kind of progressivism that would have won him some compensating support. Underwood's candidacy also suffered from a view that he was not a "real southerner" since he had been born in Kentucky, and his father had served as a colonel in the Union Army. "He is a New York candidate living in the South," said William Jennings Bryan. McAdoo defeated Underwood in Georgia and even split the Alabama delegation. Whatever appeal that Underwood had outside of the South was erased by the emerging candidacy of Al Smith.

=== McAdoo vs. Smith ===
In their immediate effects, the heated primary contests drew to McAdoo the financial support of the millionaires Thomas Chadbourne and Bernard Baruch, who was indebted to McAdoo for his appointment as head of the War Industries Board, and they strengthened the resolve of Governor Smith, ten years younger than McAdoo, to make a serious try for the nomination, which he had originally sought primarily to block McAdoo on the behalf of the eastern political bosses. The contests also hardened the antagonisms between the candidates and cut deeper divisions within the electorate. In doing so, they undoubtedly retrieved lost ground for McAdoo and broadened his previously shrinking base of support, drawing to him rural, Klan, and dry elements awakened by the invigorated candidacy of Smith. Senator Kenneth McKellar of Tennessee wrote to his sister Nellie: "I see McAdoo carried Georgia by such an overwhelming majority that it is likely to reinstate him in the running."

The Klan seemed to oppose every Democratic candidate except McAdoo. A Klan newspaper rejected Henry Ford because he had given a Lincoln car to a Catholic archbishop; flatly rejected Smith as a Catholic from "Jew York;" and called Underwood the "Jew, jug, Jesuit candidate." The primaries, therefore, played their part in crystallizing the split within the party that would tear it apart at the forthcoming convention.

City immigrants and McAdoo progressives had earlier joined to fight the Mellon tax plans in Congress since both groups represented people of small means. Deeper social animosities dissolved their alliance, and the urban-rural division rapidly supplanted all others. Frank Walsh, a progressive New York lawyer, wrote, "If his [Smith's] religion is a bar, of course it is all right with me to bust up the Democratic party on such an issue."

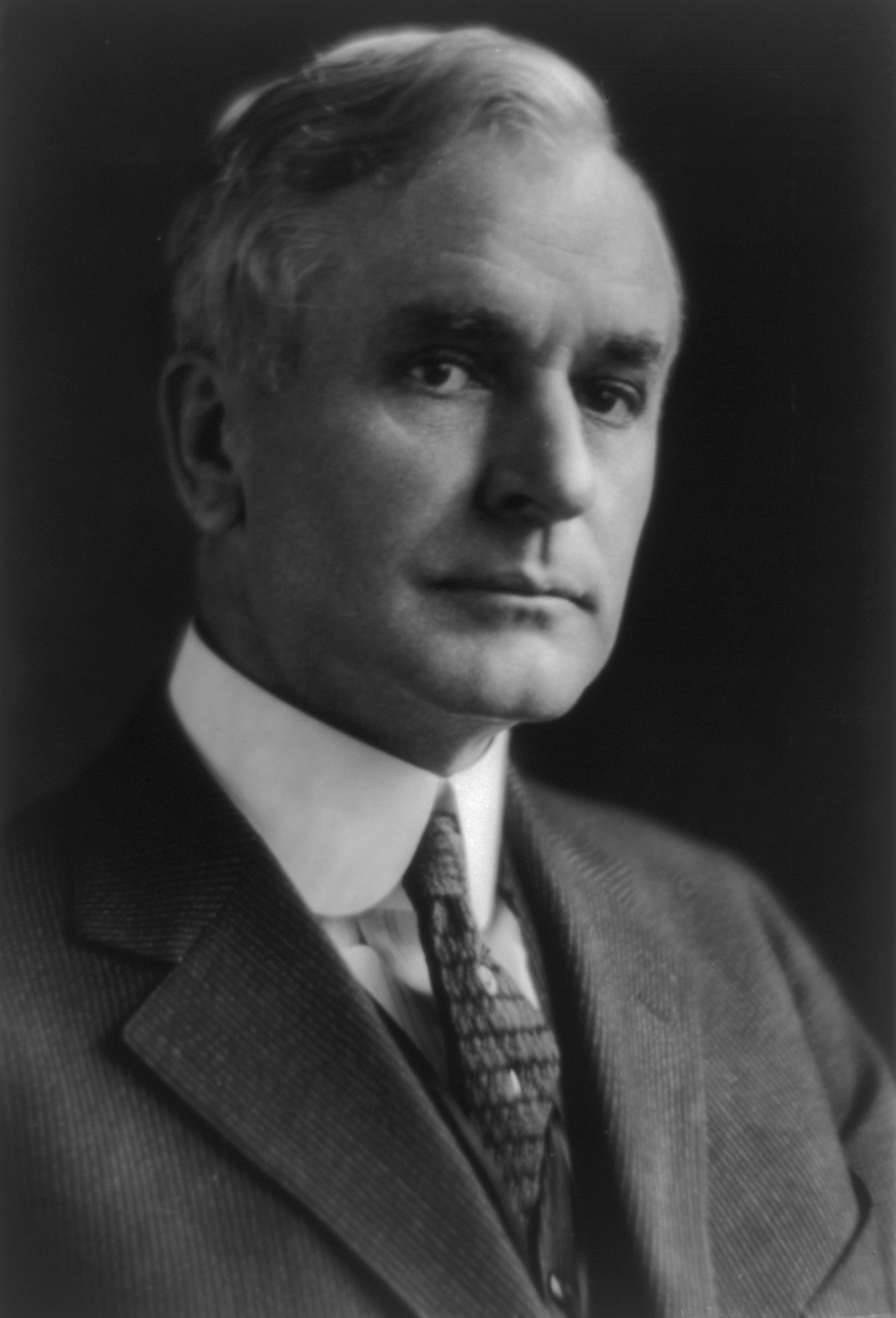
US Representative Cordell Hull

More directly, the contest between McAdoo and Smith thrust upon the Democratic national convention a dilemma of a kind that no politician would wish to confront. To reject McAdoo and nominate Smith would solidify anti-Catholic feeling and rob the party of millions of otherwise certain votes in the South and elsewhere. However, to reject Smith and nominate McAdoo would antagonize American Catholics, who constituted some 16 percent of the population, most of whom could normally be counted upon by the Democrats. Either selection would affect significantly the future of the party.

Now in the ostensibly-neutral hands of Cordell Hull, the chairman of the Democratic National Convention, party machinery was expected to shift to the victor during the convention, and a respectable run in the fall election would insure the victor's continued supremacy in Democratic politics.

Despite the strong showing by McAdoo in the primaries, an argument could be made for the political wisdom of a Smith ticket. In the 1922 congressional elections, the largest gains had come in New York, New Jersey, and other urban areas in which Roman Catholicism was strong. The new strength of the party, those elections seemed to indicate, lay not in the traditionalist countryside of Bryan and McAdoo but in the tenement areas of the city and the regions of rapid industrialization.

Also, as Franklin Roosevelt wrote to Josephus Daniels, Smith's followers came from states with big electoral votes that then often swung a presidential election: Massachusetts, New York, and Illinois. However, the strain of anti-Catholicism in America was a threat of proportions that could not be easily calculated.

Nevertheless, no one had gotten anywhere near the two thirds needed to win at the convention in New York.

== See also ==
- Republican Party presidential primaries, 1924
- White primary
