= Frank Brown Park =

Outdoor recreation facility in Panama City Beach, Florida

Coordinates: 30.2309°N 85.8773°W

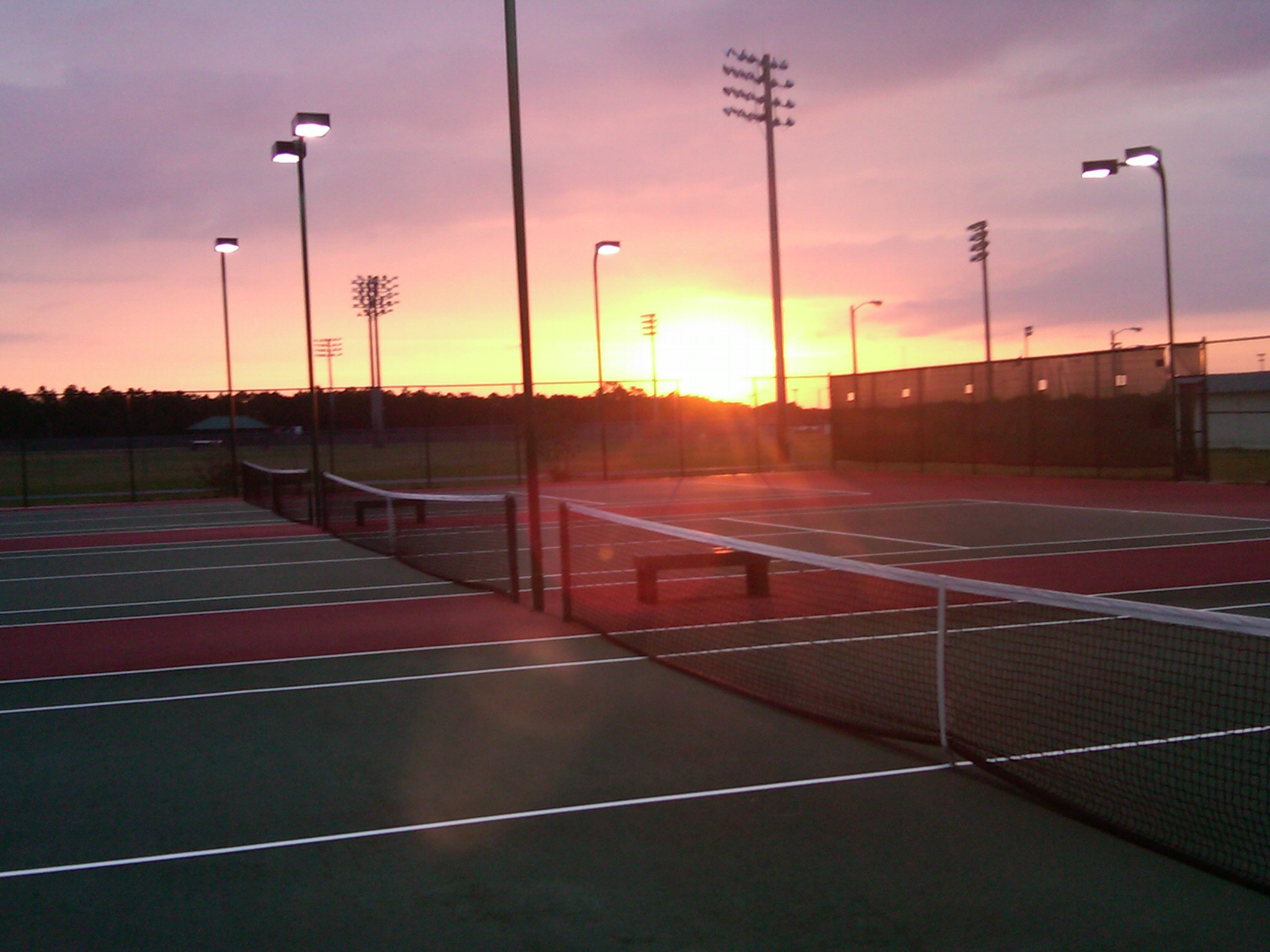
Tennis courts at Frank Brown Park, November 2009

Frank Brown Park is a 200-acre (0.81 km^{2}) outdoor recreation facility in Panama City Beach, Florida. The park hosts various sporting events throughout the year, and has facilities available for public use.

== Events ==
Organizations such as the Ironman Florida Triathlon, United States Specialty Sports Association, National Softball Association, Grand Slam Baseball, United States Fastpitch Association, Independent Softball Association, World Softball League and the International Flag Football Association hold championship events at the Frank Brown facilities.

== Facilities ==
The park includes nine softball fields, two tee ball fields, three soccer fields, four multi-purpose football fields, four tennis courts, two outdoor basketball courts, two shuffleboard courts, one indoor gym, one playground, one large group picnic pavilion, one Freshwater Youth Fishing pond, one 22-acre (89,000 m^{2}) festival site, one fenced dog play area, one aquatic center and 1.5 miles (2.4 km) of greenways and trails.

The park has undergone over $10 million worth of expansions and renovations since 2002, including the addition of an aquatic center. An additional $7.5 million in renovations to the park are currently being proposed by the Bay County Tourist Development Council.
