= Fastpitch softball =

Form of softball

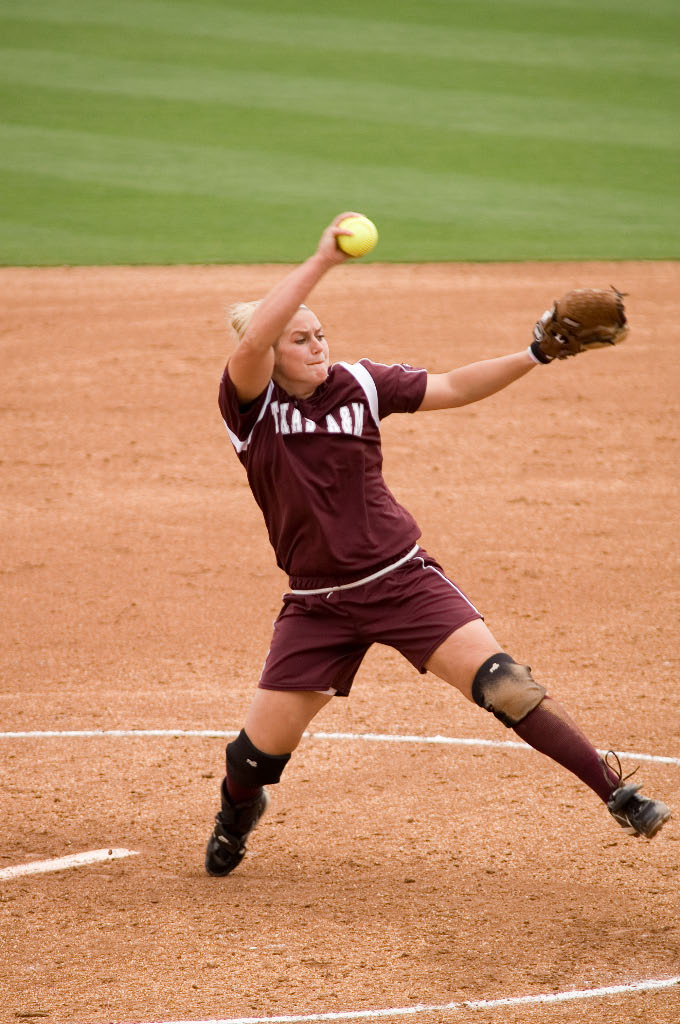
Megan Gibson-Loftin pitching in the "windmill" motion for Texas A&M

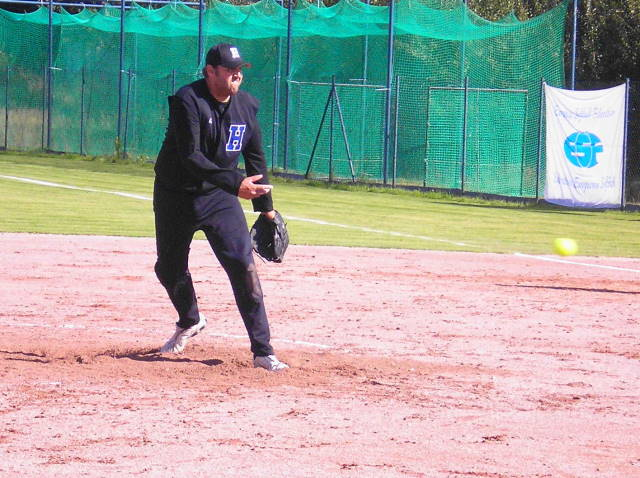
A Danish pitcher demonstrates the underhand release of the ball.

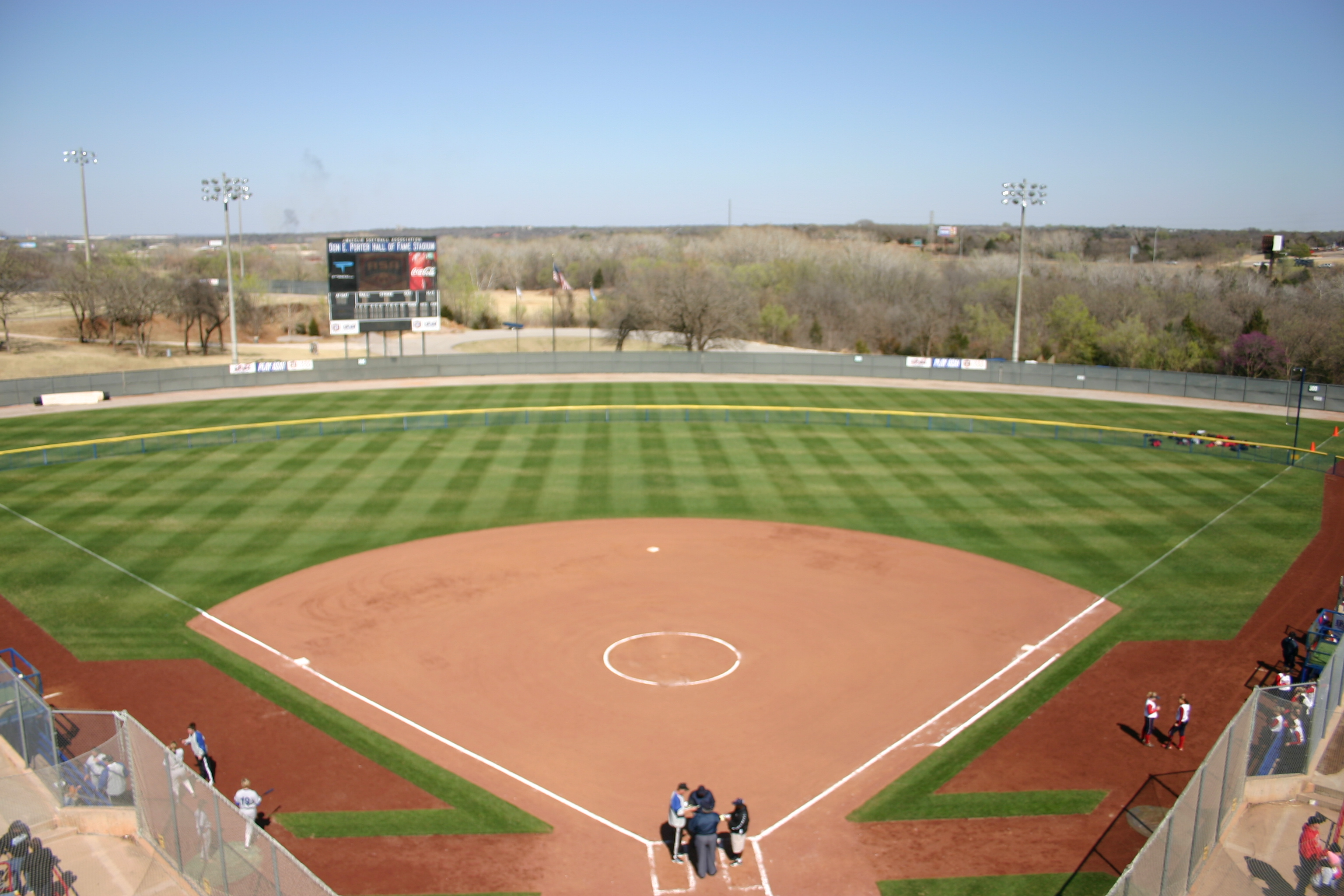
The pitching circle, seen here at ASA Hall of Fame Stadium in Oklahoma City, is a required part of ASA and WBSC fastpitch softball.

Fastpitch softball, or simply fastpitch, is a form of softball played by both women and men. While the teams are most often segregated by sex, coed fast-pitch leagues also exist. Considered the most competitive form of softball, fastpitch is the format played at the Olympic Games. Softball was on the International Olympic Committee (IOC) program in 1996, 2000, 2004, 2008, and 2020. Softball will return to the Olympic Games in 2028.

The fastpitch style is also used in college softball and other international competition. It is the form used in the American Women's Professional Fastpitch league, a women's professional league whose inaugural season began in June 2022.

Pitchers throw the ball with an underhand motion at speeds up to 79.4 miles per hour (127.8 km/h) for women. Karlyn Pickens set this record while playing for Tennessee in May 2025 at the 2025 NCAA Division I softball tournament.

The pitching style of fastpitch is different from that of slowpitch softball. Pitchers in fast-pitch softball usually throw the ball using a "windmill" type of movement. In this style of pitching, the pitcher begins with the arm at the hip. A common way to be taught how to pitch is using the motions, 'repel', 'rock', 'kick', 'drag', 'toss'. The pitcher then brings the ball in a circular motion over the head, completes the circle back down at the hip, and snaps the hand. A "modified" fast pitch is identical to a "windmill" pitch except the arm is not brought over the head in a full windmill motion, but instead is brought behind the body and is then thrust directly forward for the release. Another type of pitching movement is the "figure 8". With this style, the ball is not brought over the head at all but down and behind the body and back in one smooth motion tracing out a figure eight. There are many different pitches which can be thrown, including a two-seam fastball, four-seam fastball, changeup, two different riseballs, two dropballs, curveball, offspeed, screwball, knuckleball and more. These pitches can be taught in many different styles, depending on the pitching coach's method and the player's abilities.

Catching is also a very important part of fast pitch softball. Without a fast-paced catcher, the pitcher will not succeed. The catcher needs to be able to recognize the batters, their hitting style, and the right pitches to call. If there is a bad pitch that hits the ground, the catcher needs to block it so runs do not score, and runners do not advance on the bases. Catchers can also "frame" pitches by pulling the ball towards the center of the plate to convince the umpires to call the pitch a strike. Catchers are protected by a chest guard, helmet, mouth guard, leg protectors, and a specialized mitt. This is due to the proximity of the batters to the catcher. Catchers are responsible for throwing runners out when they try to steal bases, meaning that a catcher must have a strong arm and a quick throw. The catcher is the brains of the team, and carries it as a whole.

The game of fastpitch softball is similar to baseball, and includes stealing bases and bunting. Unlike baseball, however, there is no "leading off" – the baserunner can only leave the base when the pitcher releases the ball. Most leagues use the "dropped third strike" rule, which allows the batter to attempt an advance to first base when the catcher fails to catch the third strike.

== History ==
=== United States ===
Fast pitch softball became a very popular sport in the US during the 1930s and 1940s. Commercial and semi-pro leagues sprang up all over the country in large cities and small towns alike. Both men's and women's leagues were popular and it was not unusual for both to be playing on the same night in a "double-header". Because of the speed of these games, they were very popular with spectators. During those years, the women's games were popular and considered fun to watch but the real draws were the men's games. Pitchers that could hurl the ball in excess of 85 mph at a batter 46 feet away could strike out 15 to 20 batters a game. To make things even more difficult, the underhand delivery meant the ball was rising as it approached the plate and a talented pitcher could make the ball perform some baffling aerobatics on its journey to the batter's box.

The Amateur Softball Association (ASA) was formed in 1934 and held a National tournament each year to determine the best softball team in America. Soon there were state and regional tournaments all over the country selecting teams to vie for the coveted National Championship. Competition was fierce with teams competing not only on the field but in recruiting the best "fire baller" around. It was not unusual for a talented pitcher to be recruited by the winning team after his team was eliminated from a tournament. It was rumored that some of these "amateurs" were making fair living from playing softball.

Fast pitch softball started to lose popularity in the mid-50s for a variety of reasons. More and more families were getting television in their homes and so games drew smaller crowds. More teams were starting to play "slow pitch" with its greater emphasis on fielding. Although men's fast pitch softball is still played, the game is now mostly played by women.

One of the most important milestones in softball and American softball history occurred when the Amateur Softball Association sent the Connecticut Brakettes of Stratford, Connecticut, to compete in the International Softball Federation's (ISF) Women's World championship in 1965. The Brakettes were the ASA's first women's softball team and they finished the competition with a record of 8–3 and a silver medal. After the championship, the Brakettes travelled to many locations around the world to serve as ambassadors for the sport. During the trip, the coaches and players held softball clinics to give a diverse group of people a better understanding of softball.

Growth in America

The number of Division I softball teams in the US grew from 222 in 1997 to 277 in 2007. The number of youth teams also increased from 73,567 in 1995 to 86,049 that same year.

Currently, there are 286 National Collegiate Athletic Association (NCAA) Division 1 (D1) softball colleges across the nation. This provides an opportunity for competitors to play Division 1 softball in every state across America. 64 teams compete in the NCAA tournament, only 16 teams make it to the Super Regionals and 8 teams compete in the College Softball World Series, hosted each year in May and June in Oklahoma City.

=== Olympic acceptance ===
As the worldwide participation in softball continued to grow, the sport was eventually included in the 1996 Summer Olympic Games in Atlanta, Georgia, US.

==== USA Olympic team ====
In America, the ASA responded by developing a coaching pool consisting of the best coaches in the country along with a selection committee which would recruit the most talented US softball players. The selection committee was responsible for making the final cuts to decide which players would compete for the US team at all international competitions throughout the year. The strategy was successful as the United States won their first olympic gold medal in softball against China with a 3–0 win. This success was followed by two more olympic gold medals and seven World Championships.

== Controversies ==
In July 2005, IOC members voted 52–52 (with one abstention), to remove softball (along with baseball) from the Olympic program after the 2008 Olympic Games. Softball and baseball needed a majority vote to stay. The two sports were the first to be cut since polo in 1936. One of the reasons softball was considered for elimination from the Olympics was because there was not enough global participation and not enough depth of talent worldwide to merit Olympic status. In the three Summer Olympics which included a softball competition, four countries won medals: the United States, Australia, China and Japan.

In response to the expressed concern that there was not enough talent depth worldwide, the ISF began to introduce the game in places where softball is not traditionally played. For example, the US team donated equipment and hosted coaching clinics in the Middle East, Africa and Europe. The US team's Jessica Mendoza has also delivered equipment and conducted clinics in other countries such as Brazil, the Czech Republic and South Africa.

After softball's elimination from 2012 Olympics became a possibility, the ASA created the World Cup of Softball in Oklahoma City in 2005. This event allows the top countries in the world to compete on a yearly basis. The 2005 World Cup of Softball drew over 18,000 fans around the world for a competition between the top five international softball teams.

The World Cup of Softball was later established as one of the premier events for the sport of softball. At the second World Cup of Softball, the attendance record was broken and the television ratings were higher than in any previous US Softball event on ESPN and ESPN2. Fastpitch softball, however, was added to the 2020 Summer Olympics.

== Olympic involvement ==
Many countries have expressed interest in the addition of softball especially to the Olympic games, with collegiate softball and semi-professional games growing.

Olympic level softball was on the Summer Olympic program from 1996 to 2008. The sport of softball was later removed from the programme for 2012 and 2016, but was slated to be re-added for the 2020 Summer Olympics. Along with softball, the International Olympic Committee (IOC) had added baseball, skateboarding, karate, sports climbing, and surfing to the Summer Olympic games. The IOC expressed consideration of the youth focus and increasing interest in the newly added sports.

Originally scheduled to take place from July to August 2020, the 2020 Summer Olympics was postponed in March 2020 and pushed forward to 2021 as a result of the COVID-19 pandemic.

In August 2021, the IOC announced that softball would not be part of the 2024 Paris Olympics.

== Technique ==
=== Pitching ===
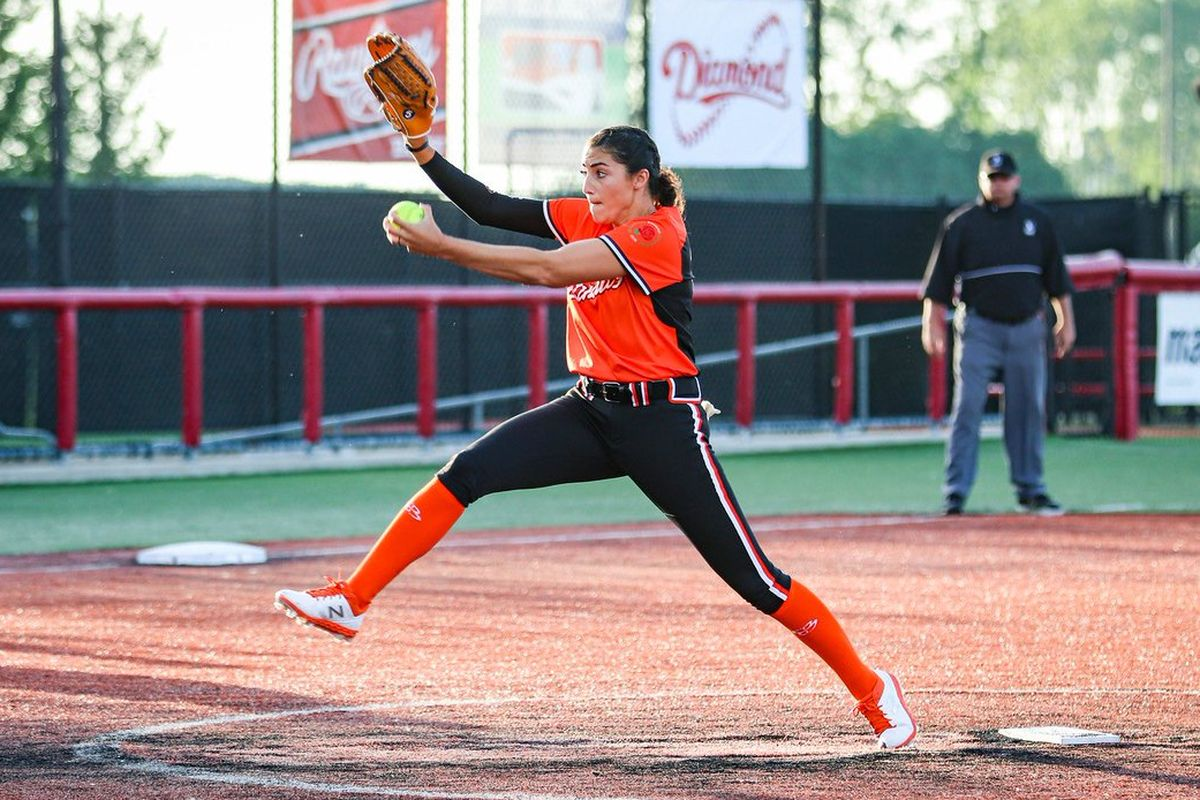
NPF Chicago Bandits Pitcher in pitching motion.

Softball pitchers at any level require a level of accuracy with their pitches. An accurate pitch is achieved through different techniques which help the pitcher to maintain a certain consistency of body weight and balance. The pitch starts with the grip and ends with a follow through after the ball is released from the hand of the pitcher. An accurate pitch requires skill in six areas: the grip, stance, windup, stride, release and follow through.

A perfect grip depends on which pitch the pitcher is throwing. For a normal fastball, it is beneficial to hold the ball firmly with your fingertips, but not so that the ball is pushed deep into your palm of your hand. In fastpitch softball, there are several types of grips for various pitches. There is not one correct way to hold or throw a pitch, it all depends on the pitcher. Some grips are easier for individuals due to the size of their hand while others find certain grips more difficult. This is why younger pitchers who have not developed into their normal hand size start with more basic grips such as the fastball. The main pitches involved in fastpitch softball are as follows: fastball, change-up, curveball, drop ball, and rise ball. Other pitches include both the drop curve, and well as the drop screw, and the backdoor curve.

The pitcher's stance is also important when pitching. In different types of competitions, different rules concerning the stance apply. In college, professional, and Olympic Games, pitchers must place both feet on the rubber when starting the pitch. Other competitions require having only one foot on the rubber. The pitcher's feet are placed at a distance that is not larger than the width of the shoulders, with either one foot or both feet on the rubber. A common stance for pitchers is to have the ball of the foot on the same side as the throwing arm (also called the pivot foot) on the front edge of the rubber, and the toes of the alternate foot shoulder width apart and toward the middle or back side of the rubber.

A stride is performed from the beginning stance by rocking back, shifting the weight back to gain momentum and then moving the weight forward onto the ball of the pivot foot. The pitcher then pushes off the rubber with the pivot foot, pivoting that foot in a 30 to 40 degree, clockwise angle as the opposite leg moves out into a stride. The stride leg must land along the "power line", which means that the pitcher's body is in line with the plate, with the pitcher's hips facing the third base line. The angle of a pitch can be altered in different ways through the stride. If the pitcher is aiming for the outside corner of the plate, the pitcher will pivot, stride with the opposite foot, and land slightly outside of the "power line"; if the inside corner is aimed, the pitcher will land slightly inside. If the movement is very subtle, the batter will probably not be able to notice the change of angle. In most leagues during the pitcher's delivery, the pivot foot must drag along the ground in order for the pitch to be legal. If the drag foot lifts off the ground, an illegal pitch will be called for crow hopping. In this case, the batter is awarded with one ball to the count, and all base runners advance to the next base. In international play – and in most men's leagues – the pitcher is allowed to jump with the pivot foot. A crow hop here is considered legal.

The windup is performed with the throwing arm and happens prior to the pitcher releasing the ball. Throughout the entire pitch, the upper body should remain upright, rather than bent over. The pitcher's throwing arm begins at the hip. Some pitchers move the throwing arm back as they shift their weight back, but it is not necessary throw an effective pitch. From the hip, the throwing arm moves up in a circle, brushing the ear, and returning to the hip prior to the release. The pitcher's arm should remain tight to the body to keep control of the pitch. This can be performed because the pitcher's lower body is pivoting in a straight line.

The release is one of the most important motions for the effectiveness of the pitch. The release technique consists of wrist-snapping and allowing the ball to roll off the fingertips when arm reaches the hip. If the snap also twists the wrist, the ball will move laterally or up and down, which can benefit the pitcher by confusing the batter. The follow through is the last motion of a pitch. This is the point when the pitcher bends the throwing arm at the elbow, and the hand moves upward, finishing in front of the pitcher's face.

==== Overuse injury risks for windmill softball pitchers ====
Windmill pitching consists of three phases. The first phase, or "wind up" involves initiation of the motion until the top of the back swing (TOB). The second phase lasts from the top of the back swing until the instant of stride foot contact (SFC). The third phase occurs between the SFC and the instant of ball release (REL).

Knowledge of the kinematic parameters of these phases is critical for physicians, physical therapists, and athletic trainers to devise better diagnostic and rehabilitative protocols that are specific to the athletes. A previous study by Alexander et al. demonstrated that the majority of kinematic parameters have low magnitudes and vary among pitchers during the windup phase. In a follow-up study, Werner et al. examined the parameters of the second and third phases, which they termed the "delivery phase". They found 7 specific parameters of pitching mechanics that correlate to risk of shoulder injury: shoulder abduction, shoulder flexion, knee flexion angle at SFC, stride length, stride angle, and elbow and hip angles at REL. Monitoring these kinematics would aid in reducing shoulder stress. Mean shoulder abduction and shoulder flexion angles at SFC were 155° ±16° and 168° ±35°, respectively. As the stride foot contacted the ground, the knee demonstrated a mean value of 27°±9° of flexion. Stride length averaged 89% ±11% of body height. Stride position varied between subjects, with a mean value of −3 ±14 cm; this indicates that when the foot contacted the ground, on average it landed slightly to the first-base side of home plate for right-handed pitchers, and to the third-base side for left-handers. The elbow flexion angle was 18° ±9° and the lower trunk (hip) angle moved toward a closed position of 52°±18° at REL. This indicated that greater degrees of shoulder abduction at SFC and greater stride angle decreased the magnitude of shoulder compression force. Conversely, longer stride, open REL hip position, and greater degrees of elbow flexion at REL and of shoulder and knee flexion at SFC all increase shoulder compression force.

Normative ranges for kinematic parameters have been established for an elite population of windmill pitchers. Specific pitching mechanic parameters correlate with clinically significant injury patterns. Interventions that take into account the aforementioned data could decrease shoulder forces, thus translating to lower rates of time-loss injury in this group of athletes. The fastest pitch on record was thrown by Eddie Feigner of "The King and His Court" who was clocked at ⁿ90 mph. Feigner was at his best in the 1950s, and it is doubtful if this figure is correct.

The fastpitch swing can be broken down into seven components: 1. Stance 2. Grip 3. Bat Position 4. Shift of Weight 5. Hand Position 6. "Squishing the Bug" 7. Follow Through and Finish. There are many drills as well that can help aid in the advancing of one's mechanisms including hitting of a tee and soft toss drills. The swing must be very concise and compact since the ball is coming very fast and there is little time to react.

=== Hitting ===
Hitting is also an important aspect of softball. Hitters will approach the plate based on a very thought out line up assigned by the coach. They will have a helmet and a bat made out of a specific composite material based on the hitter's preference and contact styles. An important technique to remember about hitting is the launch angle that the ball takes off of the bat at contact. The launch angle for a ground ball is anything less than 10° while a line drive is 10–25°. These launch angles are best for slap hitters or contact hitters, and a line drive is better than a ground ball. Fly balls come off the bat at a launch angle of 25–50° and these are good for power hitters. Fly balls are typically what a home run is made of. A pop up's launch angle is anything greater than 50°. There is never really an apparent reason to hit a fly ball, the best case scenario would be to foul it off out of play in a battle at the plate. It is always better to hit a line drive than a ground ball, especially as the defensive game gets more competitive. It is always best to find a gap rather than hit it right at the defensive players.

== Fastpitch associations ==
Associations which support fastpitch softball include:

- National Pro Fastpitch
- World Baseball Softball Confederation
- USA Softball
- National Softball Association
- Independent Softball Association
- International Softball Congress
- Little League
- USSSA
- PONY Baseball and Softball
- Premier Girls Fastpitch

Each association plays under its own official rules.

== USA Softball ==
USA Softball was created in 1933 by the American Softball Association (ASA). It is still owned and operated by the ASA, and includes the USA Men's, Women's, Junior Boys' and Junior Girls' National Team. In addition, it also oversees 150,000 amateur teams nationwide. There are 15 players on the USA Softball roster along with 3 replacement players. USA Softball offers recreational, league, tournament and National Championship play for fast pitch softball.

Before the 1996 Summer Olympics, the USA Softball National Team Selection Committee was established to make the final cuts for the team that would represent the US at every international competition. The selected 1996 United States softball team won the olympic gold medal with a 3–0 victory over China in the 1996 games.

The United States women's national softball team won three consecutive gold medals at the 1996, 2000, and 2004 Summer Olympic Games. In the 2008 olympic games, the gold medal was won by Japan after they defeated the United States. The US team received the silver medal. Softball was recognized as an official sport in the 2020 Summer Olympics. Japan won the gold medal, defeating the United States 2–0.

== See also ==
- College softball (fast-pitch at a competitive level)
- Women's Softball World Cup
