= The Church at the Beach =

- The Church at the Beach
- 30°11′5.355″N 85°48′26.01″W
- Location: 10620 Hutchison Blvd, Panama City Beach, Florida
- Country: United States
- Denomination: Baptist
- Website: tcatb.com

The Church at the Beach (Previously Gulf Beach Baptist Church) is a Baptist in Panama City Beach, Florida. It is affiliated with the Southern Baptist Convention. The church is known for its annual Easter services, which are held on the dry sand of Panama City Beach. The church also served as a testing center during the height of the COVID-19 pandemic.
