= Thunder Beach Motorcycle Rally =

Motorcycle rally in Florida

- Genre: Motorcycle rally
- Dates: Biannually on the first weekends in May and in October
- Locations: Panama City Beach, Florida
- Years active: 15
- Founded: 1999
- Attendance: 58,000–65,000
- Website: www.thunderbeachproductions.com

Thunder Beach is a biannual motorcycle rally in Panama City Beach, Florida that first began in 1999 in the Tiki Bar at the Sandpiper Beacon Beach Resort, as an event named "The Bike & Beach Bash".

The motorcycle rally attracted 65,000 people in 2007 and about 58,000 in 2008.

The event occurs in the first weekend of May and October each year and spreads across seven venues in the Panama City Beach area.
