= St. Andrews State Park =

State park in Florida, United States

Saint Andrews State Park
- IUCN category IV (habitat/species management area)
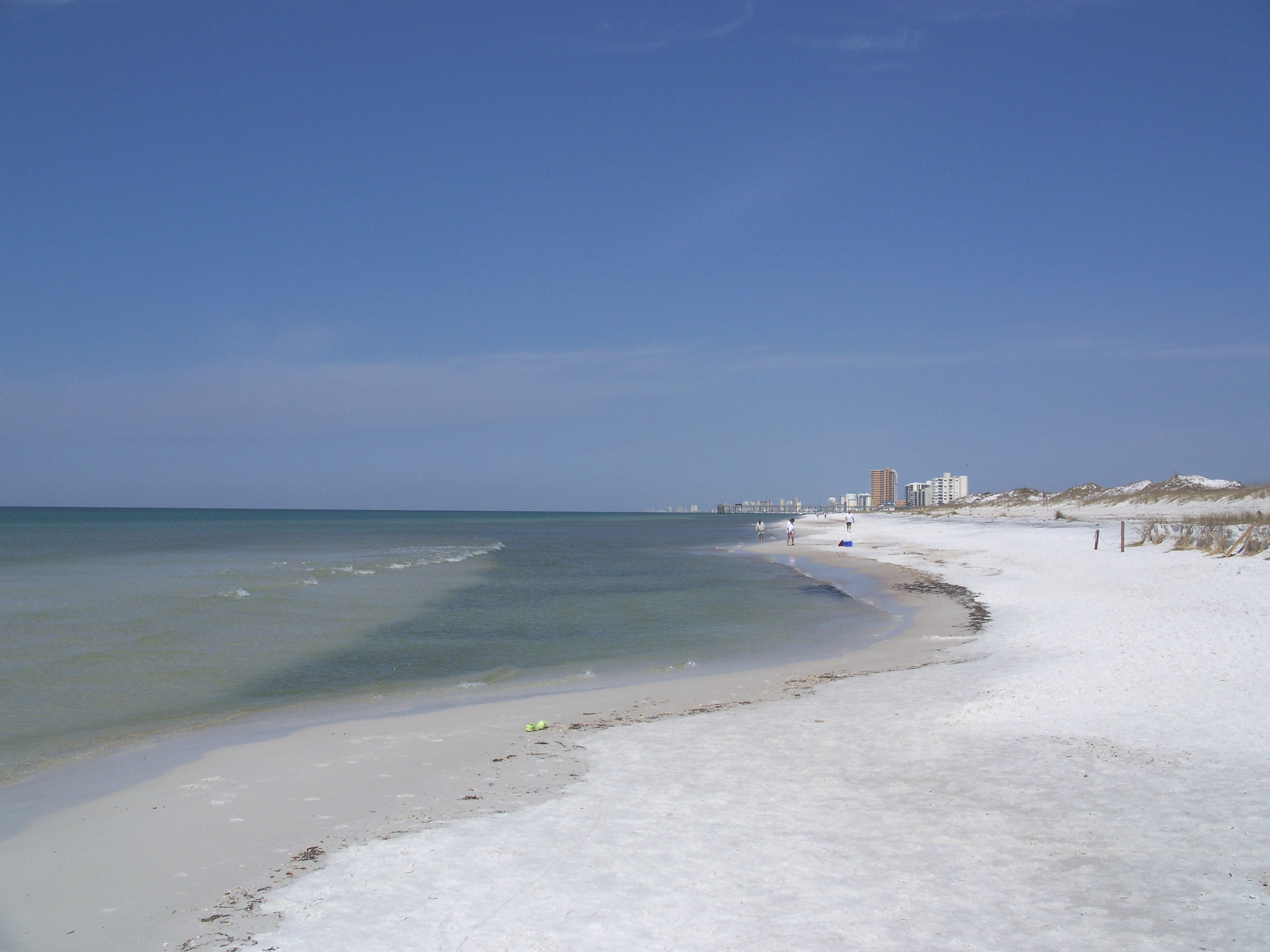
- An elevated view of the beachfront

- Location within Florida Location within the United States
- Interactive map of Saint Andrews State Park
- Location: Bay County, Florida, USA
- Nearest city: Panama City Beach, Florida
- Coordinates: 30°08′05″N 85°44′38″W
- Area: 1,167.08 acres (472.30 ha)
- Visitors: 750,000 (in 2005)
- Governing body: Florida Department of Environmental Protection

St. Andrews State Park is a 1,167.08-acre (4.7230 km^{2}) Florida State Park located three miles (5 km) east of Panama City Beach Florida, off U.S. 98. It is the headquarters of one of the state's five AmeriCorps Florida State Parks chapters.

== Recreational activities ==
The park has such amenities as two-and-a-half miles of beaches, bicycling, birding, boat tours, boating, canoeing, two fishing piers, hiking, kayaking, picnicking areas, scuba diving, snorkeling, swimming, wildlife viewing and full camping facilities. During the summer, camping reservations are recommended for best availability. It also has a visitor center, an interpretive exhibit and concessions.

== Gallery ==
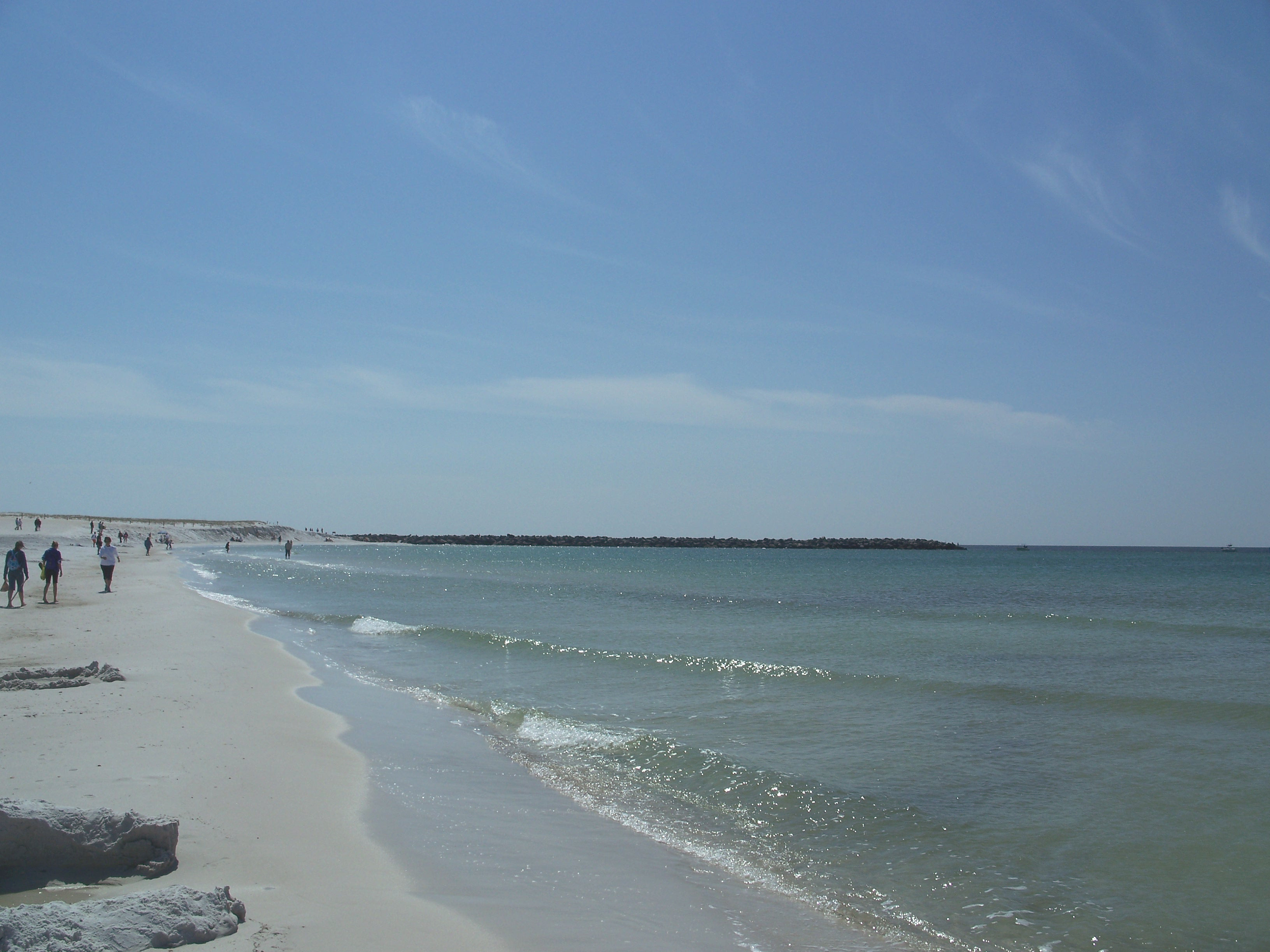
Beach on the Gulf of Mexico, in the park

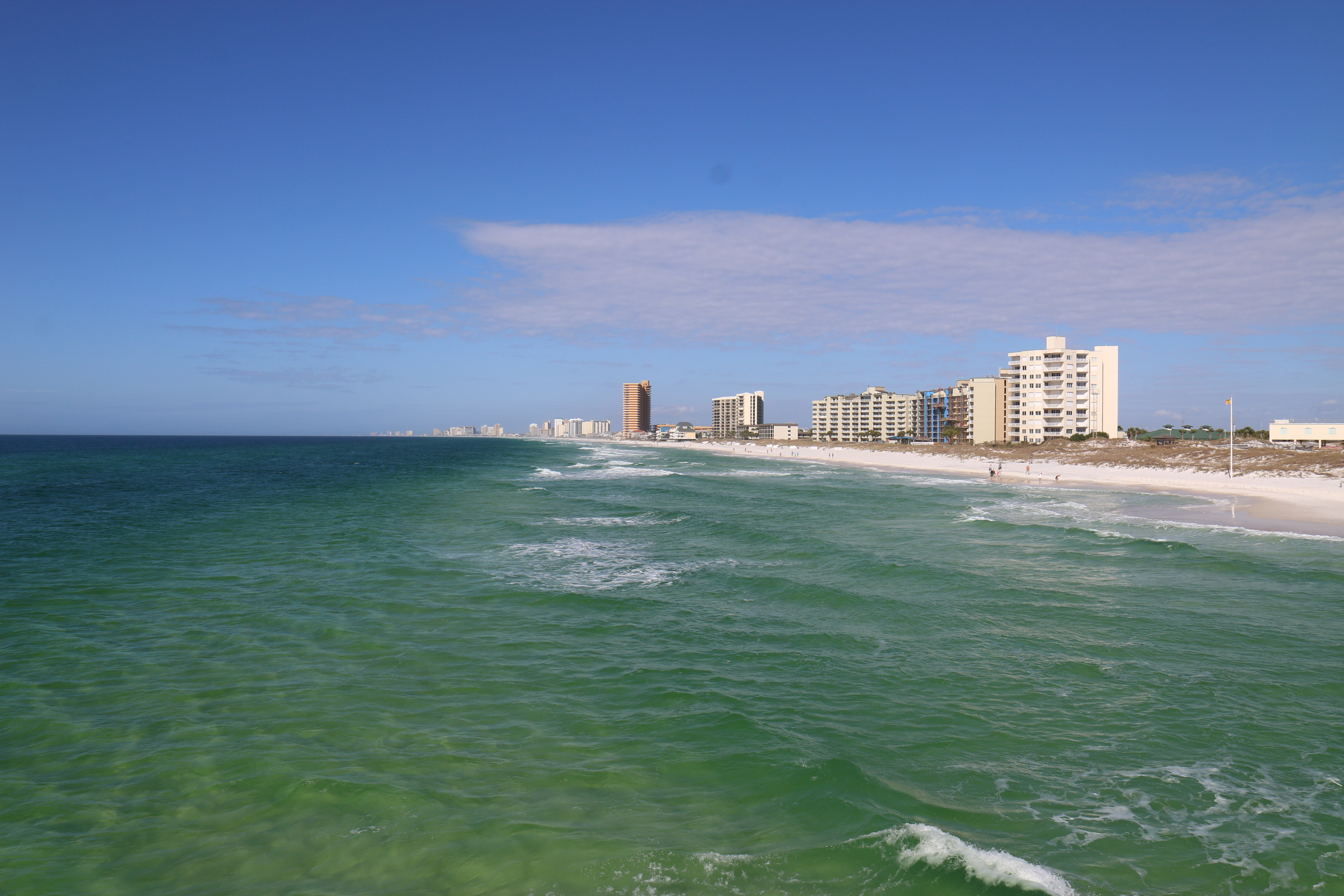
Emerald Coast waters in the park

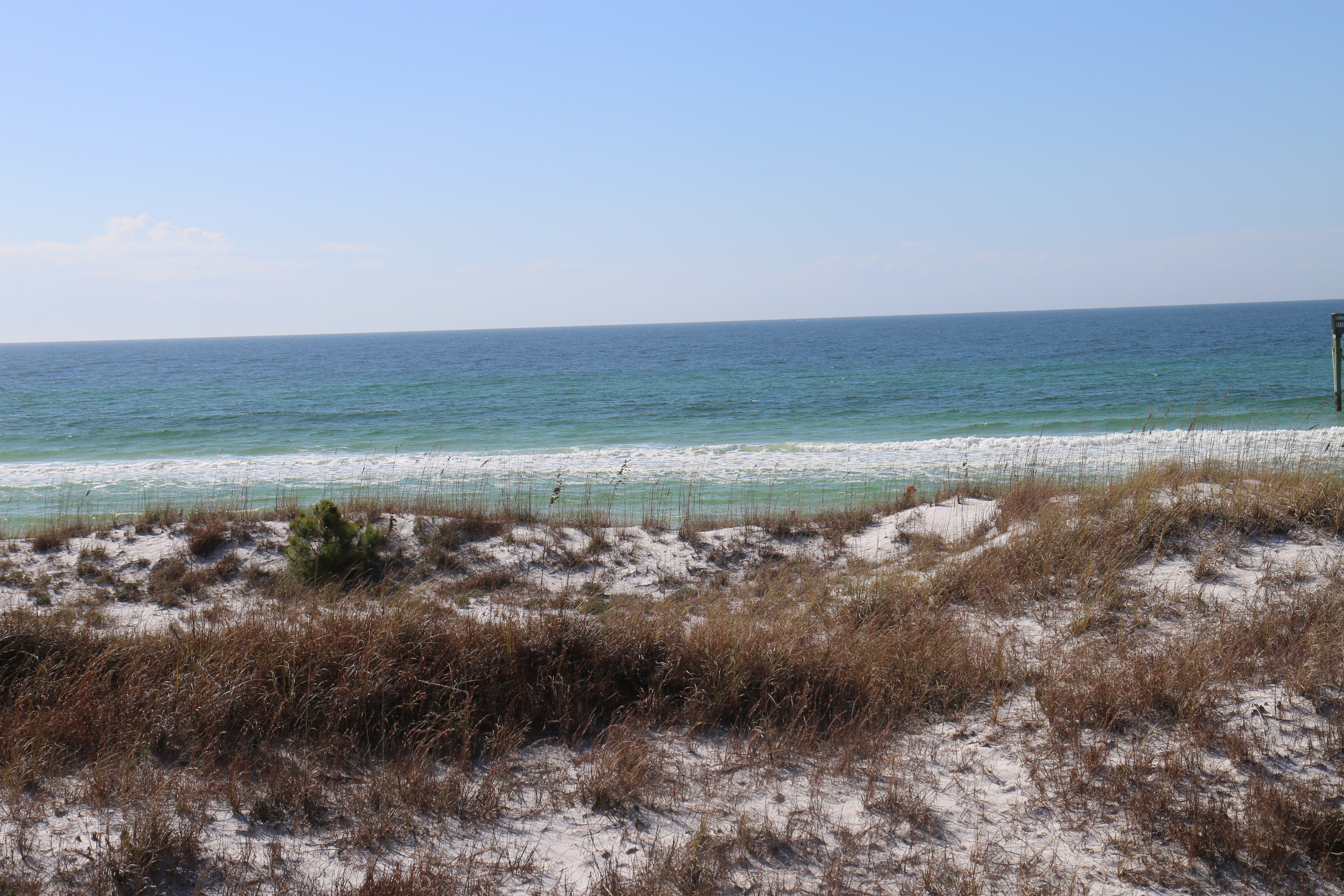
White sand dunes
