= Greenville Township, Bureau County, Illinois =

Greenville Township
- Township
- Location in Bureau County

- Bureau County's location in Illinois
- Coordinates: 41°32′27″N 89°41′29″W
- Country: United States
- State: Illinois
- County: Bureau
- Established: November 6, 1849

Area
  - Total: 36.52 sq mi (94.6 km^{2})
  - Land: 36.5 sq mi (95 km^{2})
  - Water: 0.02 sq mi (0.052 km^{2}) 0.05%
- Elevation: 630 ft (192 m)

Population (2020)
  - Total: 353
  - Density: 9.67/sq mi (3.73/km^{2})
- Time zone: UTC-6 (CST)
  - Summer (DST): UTC-5 (CDT)
- ZIP codes: 61243, 61283, 61346, 61376
- FIPS code: 17-011-31602

Greenville Township is one of twenty-five townships in Bureau County, Illinois, USA. As of the 2020 census, its population was 353 and it contained 153 housing units.

== Geography ==
According to the 2010 census, the township has a total area of 36.52 square miles (94.6 km^{2}), of which 36.5 square miles (95 km^{2}) (or 99.95%) is land and 0.02 square miles (0.052 km^{2}) (or 0.05%) is water.

=== Cities ===
- New Bedford

=== Unincorporated towns ===
- Normandy

=== Cemeteries ===
The township contains three cemeteries:

- Bowen
- Fairfield
- New Bedford Chapel

=== Major highways ===
- Illinois Route 40
- Illinois Route 92

== Demographics ==
As of the 2020 census there were 353 people, 167 households, and 147 families residing in the township. The population density was 9.67 inhabitants per square mile (3.73/km^{2}). There were 153 housing units at an average density of 4.19 per square mile (1.62/km^{2}). The racial makeup of the township was 96.88% White, 0.00% African American, 0.00% Native American, 0.00% Asian, 0.00% Pacific Islander, 0.28% from other races, and 2.83% from two or more races. Hispanic or Latino of any race were 1.13% of the population.

There were 167 households, out of which 53.30% had children under the age of 18 living with them, 38.92% were married couples living together, 47.31% had a female householder with no spouse present, and 11.98% were non-families. 11.40% of all households were made up of individuals, and 4.80% had someone living alone who was 65 years of age or older. The average household size was 1.83 and the average family size was 1.93.

The township's age distribution consisted of 15.7% under the age of 18, 10.1% from 18 to 24, 30.4% from 25 to 44, 16.7% from 45 to 64, and 27.1% who were 65 years of age or older. The median age was 42.8 years. For every 100 females, there were 93.7 males. For every 100 females age 18 and over, there were 63.3 males.

Males had a median income of $40,357 versus $19,172 for females. The per capita income for the township was $24,320. About 54.4% of families and 46.7% of the population were below the poverty line, including 83.3% of those under age 18 and 8.4% of those age 65 or over.

Historical population
| Census | Pop. | Note | %± |
|---|---|---|---|
| 2010 | 366 | | — |
| 2020 | 353 | | −3.6% |
US Decennial Census

== School districts ==
- Bureau Valley Community Unit School District 340

== Political districts ==
- Illinois's 14th congressional district
- State House District 74
- State Senate District 37
