= Independent Softball Association =

Independent Sports Association
- Formation: 1984
- Type: Softball, Baseball, Soccer, Football league
- Headquarters: Bartow, Florida, U.S.
- CEO: Mike Caldwell
- Website: https://playisasports.com/

The Independent Softball Association, now known as the Independent Sports Association (ISA), is one of four governing bodies for softball in North America. The ISA was founded by Larry Nash with the help of his wife Connie, in 1984 in Shelbyville, Tennessee. The headquarters moved to Winter Haven, Florida in 1997 and to Bartow, Florida in 2007.

== History ==
First introduced to softball in 1967, Nash was hooked from his first game. After years of playing, Nash decided that although he may have lost a step or two in the game, he still had much to offer the game of softball in the form of coaching and organizing teams. He managed a local team for a while and also became a director for one of Tennessee’s existing softball organizations. Then after many years of enjoying the sport, Nash decided he had ideas to help make softball even more fun and enjoyable and formed the Independent Softball Association.

From the first tournament with sixty-four teams and the association's first national tournament in Conyers, Georgia that saw sixteen teams, the growth began. Nash worked around the clock balancing an insurance agency, a life, a home and a growing softball association for ten years until 1994 when Nash's health came into play. That's when long time softball player, enthusiasts, sponsor and businessman Bill Ruth of Washington State University stepped in. Ruth had come across the possible sale of the ISA and figured with his love of the sport and his knowledge of business, this could work and actually acquired the association amidst some other business dealings.

The ISA has guidelines for what equipment, especially bats, are allowed in play. These guidelines are often used by municipal park district and corporate leagues who do not wish to conform to the much more restricted guidelines of the Amateur Softball Association.

Late in the 1990s the association expanded into Youth Fast Pitch and followed that expansion with the addition of Modified Pitch. In 2007 the association began its new baseball program. In October 2007, Don Stratton of Florida was named the new CEO. In 2014 Don Stratton, Hank Heffner, and Jerry Jackson became part owners of the ISA. But in 2016 came the sudden passing of Don Stratton. The ISA ownership got together and appointed Mike Caldwell from North Carolina the CEO of ISA. In 2017 Mike Caldwell also became a part owner.

== See also ==
- Amateur Softball Association
- United States Specialty Sports Association
- International Softball Congress
- National Softball Association
