= National Softball Association =

The National Softball Association (NSA) “is a sporting governing body. The NSA gives softball teams the opportunity to play in qualifying tournaments for State, National - Regional and World Series Tournament play. Also in certain NSA qualifying tournaments, teams are able to win a berth into the NSA Super-World Series. The NSA Super-World series features teams from all over the country. Some municipal park district leagues and corporate leagues follow NSA guidelines to some extent, especially in what bats are not allowed in play, however most competitive leagues require bats with ASA 2004 Certification.

== Founder ==
Hugh Cantrell is the Founder, CEO and President of the NSA. It all started, “in 1982 around his kitchen table in Lexington, Kentucky, he announced his plans for The National Softball Association to his son Eddie Ray, Don Moore, Ernie Browning, eventual board members Jim Miles and Bernie Livers”. Cantrell was a former player, coach, sponsor and tournament organizer for over 25 years. He stated that he saw that there was a need for an organization where it would put the teams and players first and do it better than the rest.

In the autumn of 1982, the plans were set in motion for Hugh and his fledgling National Softball Association to get off the ground as incorporation papers were filed in Lexington”. The official conference took place in November of the same year and it discussed the framework and groundwork for the construction in the spring of 1983.

In January 1983, Hugh appointed the first six Board of Directors that would serve as the decision-making body of the NSA”. Hugh was the seventh board member and he handled the everyday business and his six board members acted as the Rules Committee. “Six original board members are still with the NSA in some capacity as of November 2002”. This means a lot about what kind of people that Hugh selected. In 1983, the NSA sanctioned 638 teams in three states. In 2002, the NSA does or has done business in all 50 states, Canada, Guam, Puerto Rico, Mexico, The Bahamas, Russia and Holland”.

In 1985, The Presidential Award of Excellence was awarded to Hugh Cantrell, which is the NSA's highest honor”. In 1992, Hugh Cantrell, “fittingly became the first person inducted into the NSA Hall of Fame”.

In its most recent activity in the “Chattanooga Times Free Press”, its states that the National Softball Association is bringing its girl's fast-pitch Class B World Series for the Eastern half of North America to Chattanooga next summer. It also states that this event will not only feature many attendees, but their average stay is five nights, and with girls’ events there are often parents, siblings and grandparents attending.

== Hall of fame ==
The NSA Hall of Fame was established in 1992. For a list of inductees, see footnote.

== See also ==
- United States Specialty Sports Association
- International Softball Congress
- Independent Softball Association
- Amateur Softball Association

== Works cited ==
1.“About NSA.” PlayNSA. PHP-Nuke. 2009. Web. 12 Oct. 2009. 2.“National Softball Association.” Just Bats.com PlayNSA. 2009. Web.12 Oct. 2009. 3.“NSA Hall of Fame.” PlayNSA. PHP-Nuke. 2009. Web. 12 Oct. 2009. 4. Smiddie, Kelley. “Eastern World Series Will Run July 25–31.” Chattanooga Times Free Press. 18 Oct. 2009.Web. 25 Oct. 2009.
