= Panama City Beach, Florida =

Resort city in Bay County, Florida, United States

- City
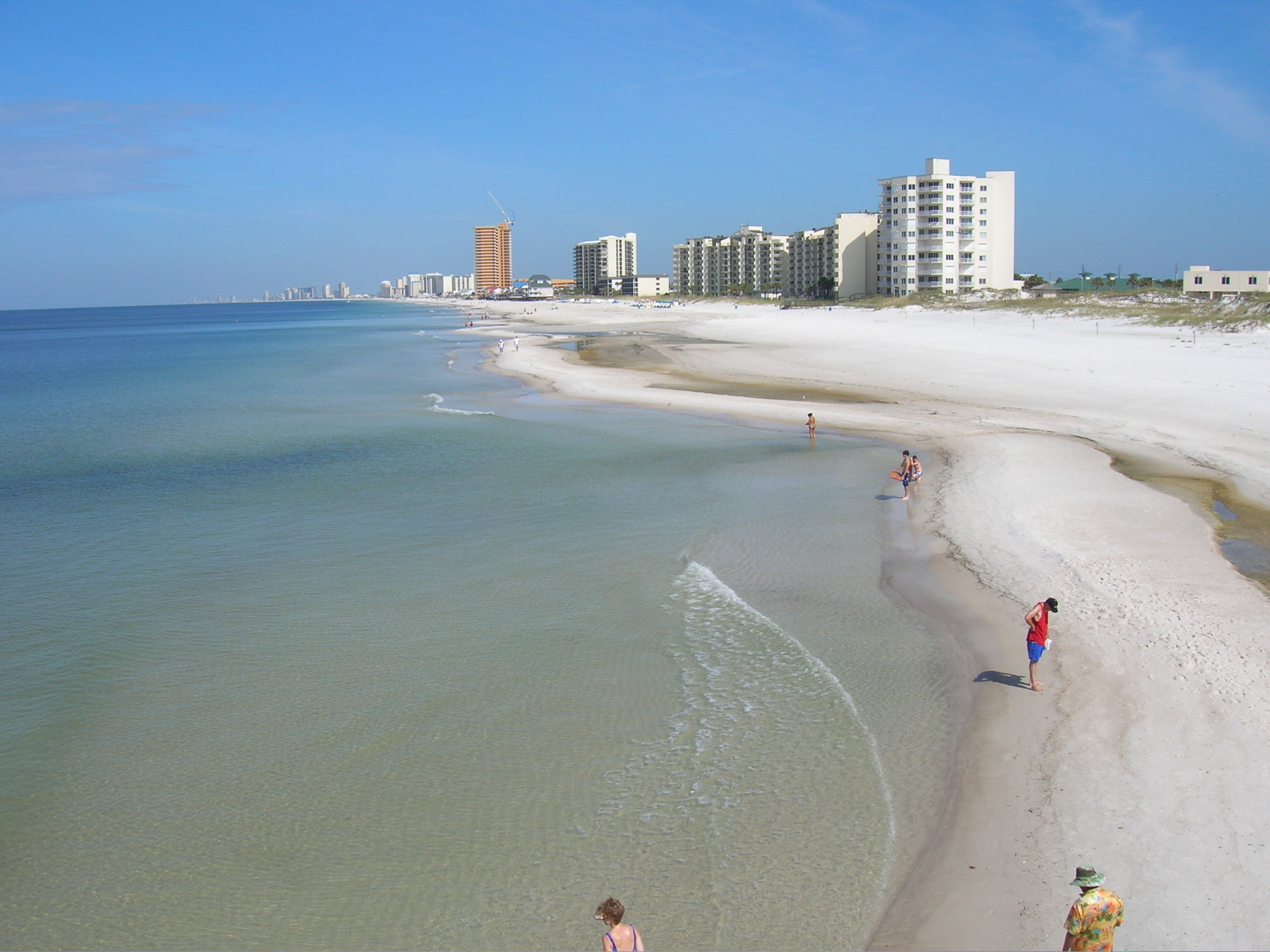
- Panama City Beach's skyline and beach, looking northwest from St. Andrews State Park

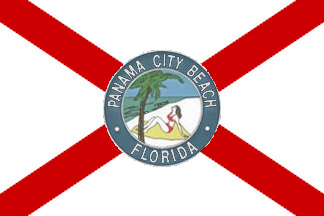
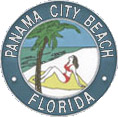
- Flag Seal
- Nicknames: PCB, Capital of Redneck Riviera, Crystal Sands, Spring Break Capital of The World
- Motto: The World's Most Beautiful Beaches
- Interactive map outlining Panama City Beach
- Location in Florida Location in the United States
- Coordinates: 30°14′12″N 85°52′40″W
- Country: United States
- State: Florida
- County: Bay
- Incorporated: 1970

Area
  - Total: 19.53 sq mi (50.57 km^{2})
  - Land: 19.32 sq mi (50.05 km^{2})
  - Water: 0.20 sq mi (0.52 km^{2})
- Elevation: 23 ft (7.0 m)

Population (2020)
  - Total: 18,094
  - Density: 936.4/sq mi (361.55/km^{2})
- Time zone: UTC– 06:00 (Central (CST))
  - Summer (DST): UTC– 05:00 (CDT)
- ZIP: 32401, 32407, 32408, 32413, 32417
- Area codes: 850, 448
- FIPS code: 12-54725
- GNIS feature ID: 2404469
- Website: www.pcbfl.gov

Panama City Beach is a resort city in the Florida Panhandle, and principal city of the Panama City metropolitan area. Being located on the Emerald Coast area of Florida, it is a popular vacation destination. Panama City Beach had a population of 18,094 at the 2020 census, up from 12,018 in 2010. Panama City Beach's slogan is "the World's Most Beautiful Beaches" due to the unique, sugar-white, sandy beaches of the Florida Panhandle.

== History ==
Panama City Beach was incorporated as a city in 1970 when a number of beachside communities merged, including the original Panama City Beach resort area founded by Gideon Thomas after the US 98 Hathaway Bridge across the west bay out of Panama City opened in 1929. Thomas purchased land along what became Thomas Dr in 1932 and opened for business in 1936. Also Long Beach Resort, created by J. E. Churchwell when he purchased land that was a former defunct beach resort owned by W.T. Sharpless (who was murdered after trying to collect tax from beachgoers in 1931) at the intersection of Thomas Dr and Front Beach Road in 1932 and opened for business in 1935. Other communities and resorts involved in the merger were Edgewater Gulf Beach, West Panama City Beach, Laguna Beach, Dutchville, Playville, and Julia.

=== Real estate boom ===
A construction boom in the early to mid-2000s changed the image of the area due to the older homes and motels being replaced with high-rise condominiums and more expansive homes, though this is turning unobstructed, low-rise beach views and affordable waterfront property into rarities. At the peak of the real estate boom, many beachfront properties had quadrupled or more in value since 2000. In November 2006, CNN/Money named Panama City Beach the number-one real-estate market in America for the next five years in.

Beachfront property has sold for upwards of $60,000 per "front foot" (linear foot) at the top of the market. The downturn in the U.S. real estate market in 2007, combined with a surge of new condo construction, brought spiraling prices somewhat under control. With the real estate boom, Panama City Beach became a well-known destination for spring break.

Category 5 Hurricane Michael made landfall near Mexico Beach in Bay County on October 10, 2018, becoming one of the strongest and most-destructive hurricanes in American history as it destroyed a large part of the county, including many structures in Mexico Beach and Panama City. An EF-0 tornado did minor damage to the northwest part of Panama City Beach on February 15.

== Geography ==
According to the United States Census Bureau, the town has a total area of 18.6 square miles (48.2 km^{2}), of which 0.23 square miles (0.6 km^{2}) or 1.17% is covered by water.

Panama City Beach is located towards the eastern half of the Florida Panhandle, along the Gulf of Mexico. The main roads through the town are U.S. Route 98 and Florida State Road 30. US 98 runs from northwest to southeast just inland from the coast, leading east 10 mi (16 km) to Panama City and northwest 47 mi (76 km) to Destin. FL-30 runs along the coast from northwest to southeast as Front Beach Rd, leading east to Panama City and northwest 15 mi (24 km) to Rosemary Beach. There are approximately 9 miles (14 km) of shoreline in Panama City Beach fronting the Gulf of Mexico.

== Demographics ==
Historical population
Census	Pop.	Note	%±
1960	36		—
1970	67		86.1%
1980	2,148		3,106.0%
1990	4,051		88.6%
2000	7,671		89.4%
2010	12,018		56.7%
2020	18,094		50.6%
U.S. Decennial Census

=== Racial and ethnic composition ===
Panama City Beach racial composition (Hispanics excluded from racial categories) (NH = Non-Hispanic)
Race	Pop 2010	Pop 2020	% 2010	% 2020
White (NH)	10,334	14,181	85.99%	78.37%
Black or African American (NH)	268	947	2.23%	5.23%
Native American or Alaska Native (NH)	64	74	0.53%	0.41%
Asian (NH)	326	556	2.71%	3.07%
Pacific Islander or Native Hawaiian (NH)	6	15	0.05%	0.08%
Some other race (NH)	22	73	0.18%	0.40%
Multiracial (NH)	301	885	2.50%	4.89%
Hispanic or Latino (any race)	697	1,363	5.80%	7.53%
Total	12,018	18,094		

=== 2020 census ===
As of the 2020 census, Panama City Beach had a population of 18,094. The median age was 45.7 years; 16.6% of residents were under 18 and 20.9% were 65 or older. For every 100 females, there were 96.4 males, and for every 100 females 18 and over, there were 95.0 males 18 and over.

About 98.4% of residents lived in urban areas, while 1.6% lived in rural areas.

Of the 8,031 households in Panama City Beach, 22.1% had children under 18 living in them, 47.5% were married-couple households, 20.2% were households with a male householder and no spouse or partner present, and 25.5% were households with a female householder and no spouse or partner present. About 30.4% of all households were made up of individuals, and 10.5% had someone living alone who was 65 or older.

The city had 20,052 housing units, of which 5.99% were vacant. The homeowner vacancy rate was 2.7% and the rental vacancy rate was 18.6%.

Racial composition as of the 2020 census
Race	Number	Percent
White	14,474	80.0%
Black or African American	968	5.3%
American Indian and Alaska Native	84	0.5%
Asian	561	3.1%
Native Hawaiian and other Pacific Islander	15	0.1%
Some other race	524	2.9%
Two or more races	1,468	8.1%
Hispanic or Latino (of any race)	1,363	7.5%

=== 2010 census ===
As of the 2010 United States census, 12,018 people, 5,149 households, and 3,166 families were residing in the city. The population density was 653.2 persons per square mile (252.2 persons/km^{2}). The 17,141 housing units had an average density of 931.6 houses per square mile (359.7 houses/km^{2}).

In 2010, of the 5,149 households, 21.1% had children under 18 living with them, 42.9% were headed by married couples living together, 9.2% had a female householder with no husband present, and 43.4% were not families. About 31.3% of all households were made up of individuals. 9.5% were someone living alone who was 65 years of age or older. The average household size was 2.22. The average family size was 2.76.

In 2010, 18.0% of the population were under the age of 18, 10.3% from 18 to 24, 27.2% from 25 to 44, 29.0% from 45 to 64, and 15.5% who were 65 or older. The median age was 40.9 years. For every 100 females, there were 99.6 males. For every 100 females 18 and over, there were 100.0 males.

=== 2000 census ===
In the 2000 census, the median income for a household was $41,198 and for a family was $49,127. Males had a median income of $32,459 versus $22,358 for females. The per capita income for the town was $26,734. About 2.2% of families and 5.0% of the population were below the poverty line, including 3.9% of those under 18 and 4.5% of those 65 or over.

== Government ==
The City of Panama City Beach has a council–manager government. The mayor sits as a council member-at-large and presides over city council meetings. If the mayor cannot preside over a city council meeting, then the vice mayor is the presiding officer of the meeting until the mayor returns to his seat.

The city manager is responsible for the administration and the day-to-day operation of all of the municipal services and city departments. The city manager also maintains intergovernmental relationships with federal, state, county, and other local governments.

The primary law enforcement agency in the town is the Panama City Beach Police Department. Part of the town is in unincorporated Bay County and is under the jurisdiction of the Bay County Sheriff's Office.

=== City council ===
- Stuart Tettemer (Republican) – Mayor Term: 2024–2028
- Paul Casto (Unknown) – Ward 1 Councilman Term: 2022–2026
- Ethan Register (Unknown) – Ward 2 Councilman Term: 2024–2028
- Mary Coburn (Unknown) – Ward 3 Council Member Term: 2022–2026
- Michael Jarman (Republican) – Vice Mayor Ward 4 Councilman Term: 2024–2028
- Eusebio Talamantez Jr. – Chief of Police

=== Former Mayors ===
- Dan Russell (Unknown) 1970–1980
- Aaron Bessant (Unknown) 1980–1982
- Philip Griffitts Sr. (Republican) 1982–2000
- Lee Sullivan (Republican) 2000–2006
- Gayle Oberst (Nonpartisan)2006–2016
- Mike Thomas (Republican) 2016–2020
- Mark Sheldon (Republican) 2020–2024

=== Services ===
- Panama City Beach Police Department
- Panama City Beach Fire Rescue

== Education ==
Surfside Middle School serves as the main middle school and Arnold High School serves as the main high school for Panama City Beach.

Primary and secondary public education is provided by the Bay District Schools.

Gulf Coast State College is located in Panama City, just across the Hathaway Bridge from Panama City Beach. Florida State University Panama City, a branch campus, is also located in Panama City.

== Transportation ==
The Northwest Florida Beaches International Airport (ECP) provides commercial flights into the area. The airport serves private aircraft, domestic passenger flights, and freight/cargo flights. It is the first international airport to be constructed after the September 11 terrorist attacks. Other modes of transportation include scooters, which can be rented by the day, as well as taxi and shuttle companies, which are permitted by the local police.

Panama City Beach also has public bus transportation known as Bayway available hourly Monday through Saturday. The Bayway runs throughout the county.

=== Major highways ===
- US 98 is an east–west highway running along the Gulf Coast. It is the main route to Destin and Panama City.
- State Road 79 is a north–south highway that starts in Panama City Beach and heads north to Interstate 10 and on to the Alabama state line.
- State Road 30, formerly US 98 Alt, also named Front Beach Road, is an east–west highway that runs mostly along the beach front, beginning and ending at US 98.
- State Road 392A, also named Hutichison Boulevard (formerly known as Middle Beach Road), is an east–west highway that runs slightly inland, generally parallel, and beginning and ending at State Road 30/Front Beach Road.

== Sports ==
The town was home to the Panama City Beach Pirates, a fourth-division soccer team from 2007 to 2015.

World Championship Wrestling held its last WCW Nitro event in Panama City Beach. WCW was bought out by its rival, WWF (now WWE).

== Recreation ==
- Frank Brown Park is a 100-acre complex with baseball, softball, soccer, and T-ball fields, basketball and tennis courts, several playgrounds, shuffleboard courts, a youth fishing pond, three dog park enclosures, and a 20-acre festival site.
- Panama City Acquatics Center is located at Frank Brown Park; the center includes an outdoor Olympic-sized pool and kids' splash pool.
- Publix Sports Park is a 160-acre sports complex with 13 fields for soccer, lacrosse, baseball, and more. Nine are synthetic turf fields.
- St. Andrews State Park offers a variety of experiences, including swimming, boating, camping, snorkeling, and bicycling.

=== Gallery ===
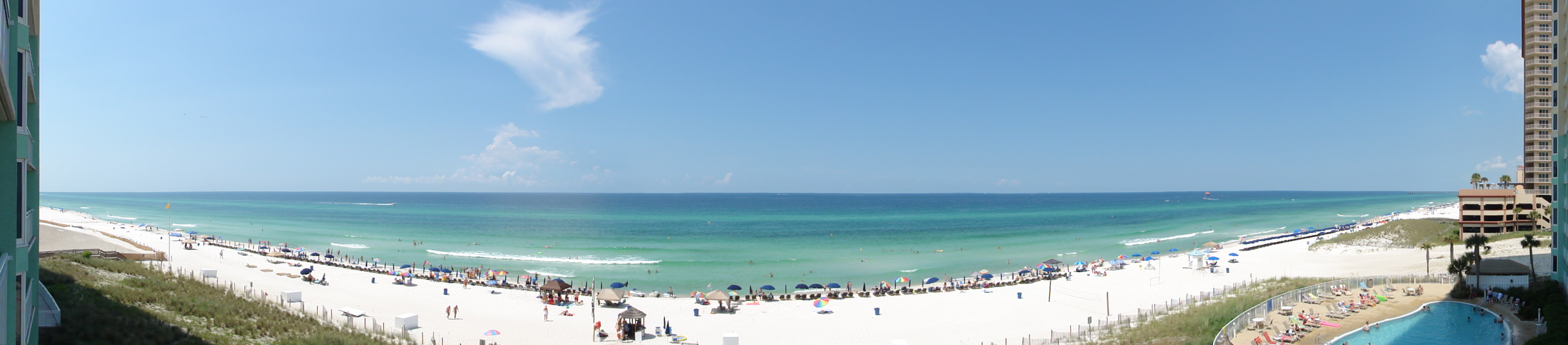
Panama City Beach Panorama
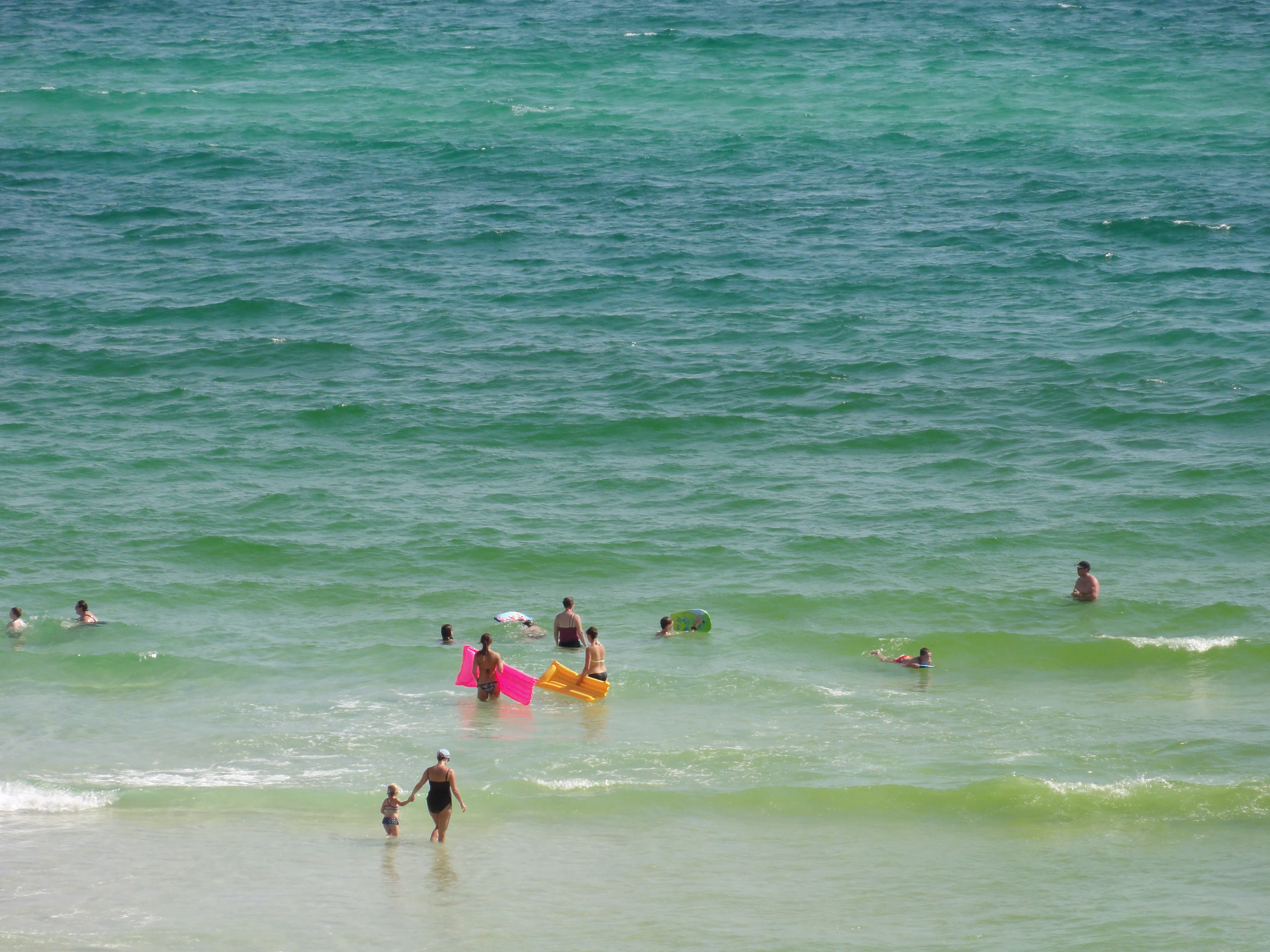
The city lies on Florida's "Emerald Coast" of the Gulf of Mexico

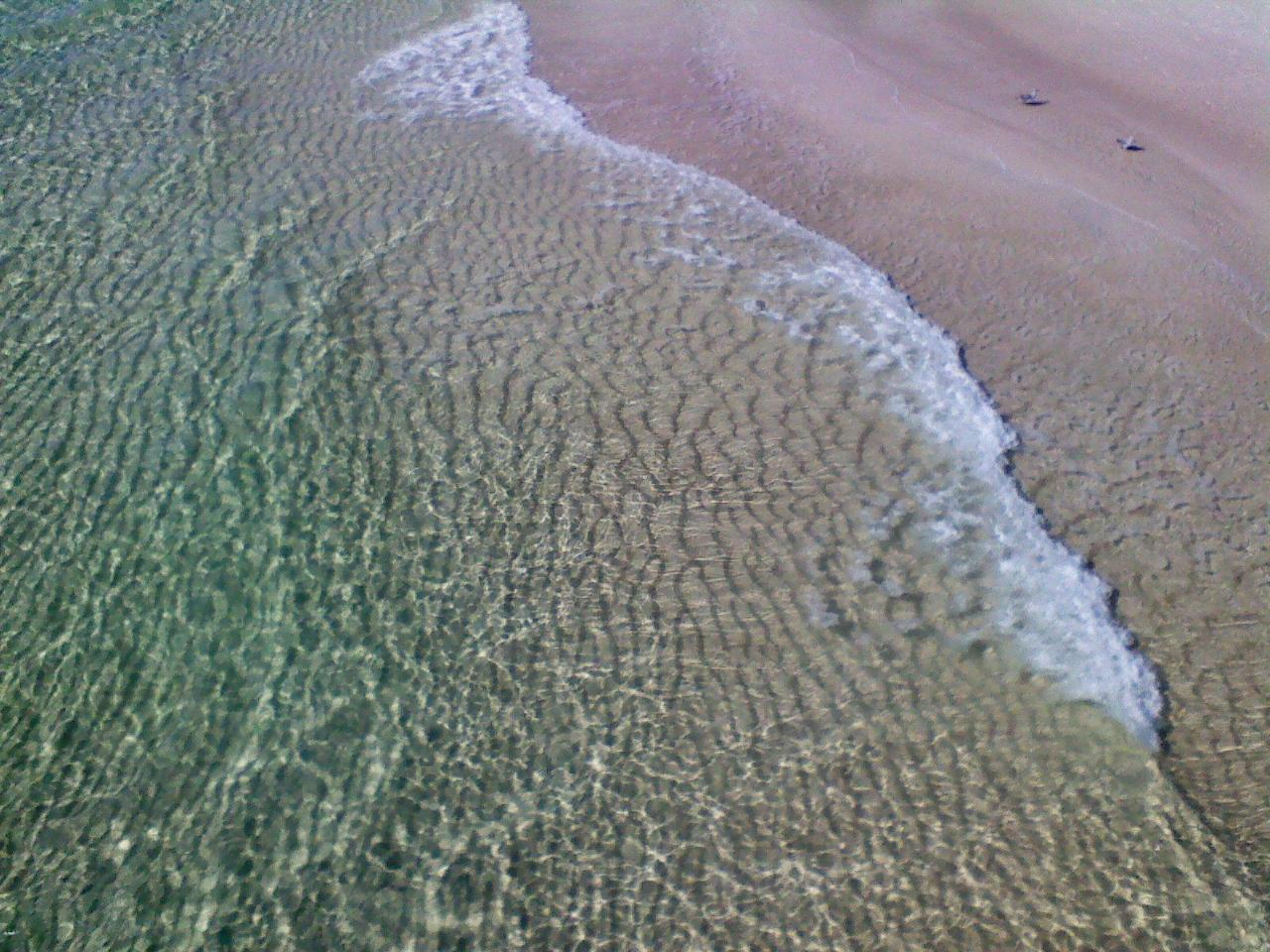
Clear waters as seen from Pier Park's pier

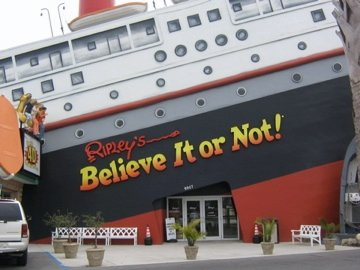
Ripley's Believe it or Not! museum, a tourist attraction

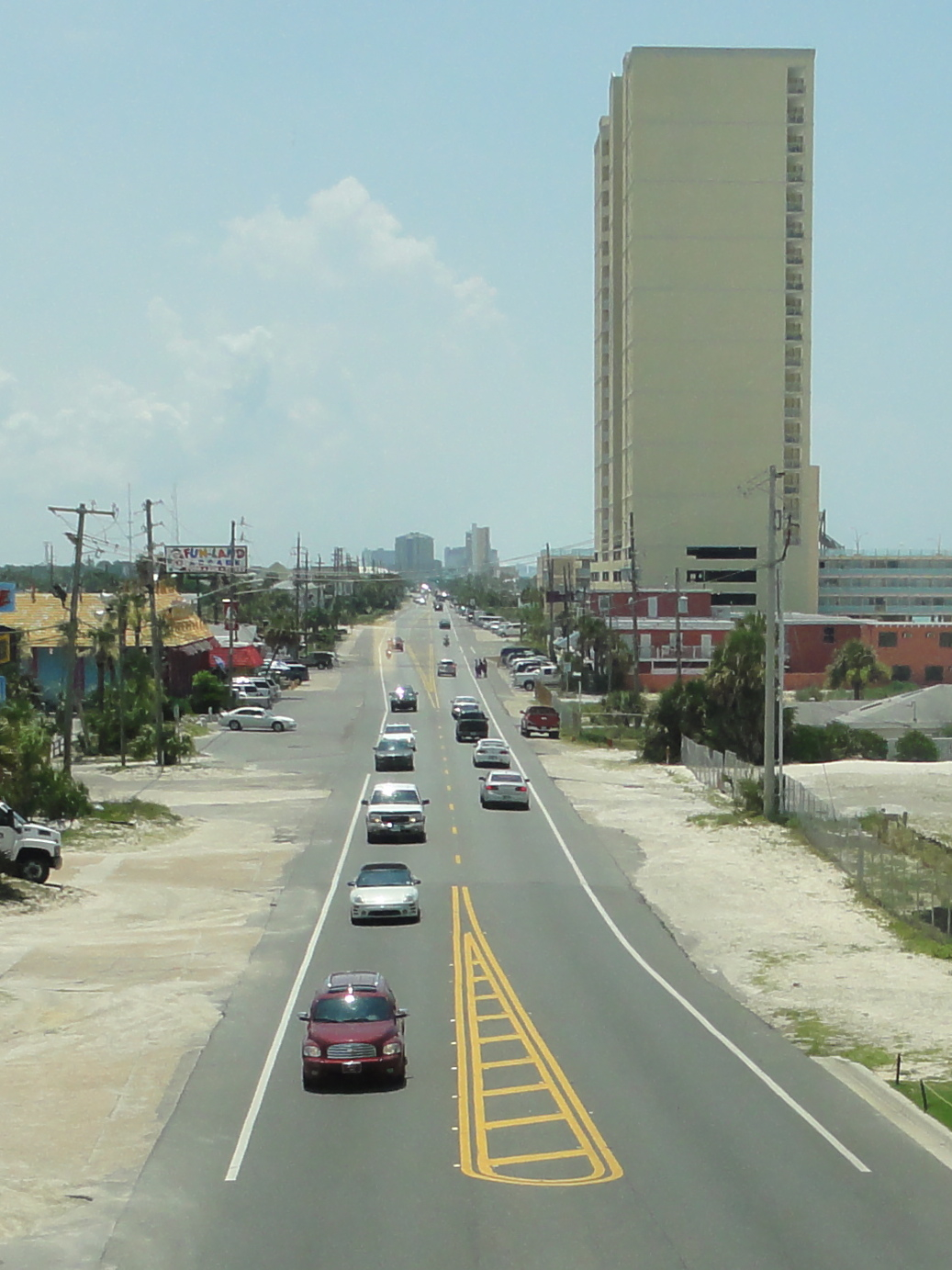
Looking down on Front Beach Road

== In popular culture ==
- Panama City Beach is the setting for the 2015 film Dancin': It's On!
- Thunder Beach Motorcycle Rally
- Gulf Coast Jam, a three-day outdoor concert event, is held annually in May/June and showcases country music performers. The event in 2024 was sold out.
- The first two seasons of MTV's Floribama Shore were filmed in the city.
