= New Bedford, Illinois =

New Bedford
- Village
- Location of New Bedford in Bureau County, Illinois.
- Coordinates: 41°30′41″N 89°43′06″W
- Country: United States
- State: Illinois
- County: Bureau
- Township: Greenville

Area
  - Total: 0.155 sq mi (0.40 km^{2})
  - Land: 0.155 sq mi (0.40 km^{2})
  - Water: 0.00 sq mi (0 km^{2})
- Elevation: 630 ft (190 m)

Population (2020)
  - Total: 76
  - Density: 490/sq mi (190/km^{2})
- Time zone: UTC-6 (CST)
  - Summer (DST): UTC-5 (CDT)
- ZIP Code(s): 61346
- Area codes: 815 & 779
- FIPS code: 17-52155
- GNIS feature ID: 2399455

New Bedford is a village in Bureau County, Illinois, United States. The population was 76 at the 2020 census. It is part of the Ottawa Micropolitan Statistical Area.

== History ==
In October 1836, Henry Thomas of West Bureau Township registered land at the narrows (now New Bedford), and for a number of years, it was the only registered tract in that section of the county. Henry Thomas was one of the first settlers to enter land at the narrows, which is now New Bedford, in October of 1836. For quite a few years, his land was the only entered tract in that section of the country. It was formerly laid out and named by the settlers from New Bedford, Massachusetts, and was originally called Winnebago. The post office for Winnebago was established on June 12, 1844, and was changed to New Bedford on July 31, 1855. New Bedford never had a railroad and remained a small village throughout its history. In 2000, the population was 95. In 2008, the population was 91. In the spring of 1837, Cyrus Watson, the first settler on Green River, built a cabin on Thomas' land, believing it to be vacant. About this time, a state road was laid from Princeton to Prophetstown on the Rock River, crossing the Green River at this point. Henry Thomas built a ferry boat, and for a number of years it was known as Thomas' Ferry.

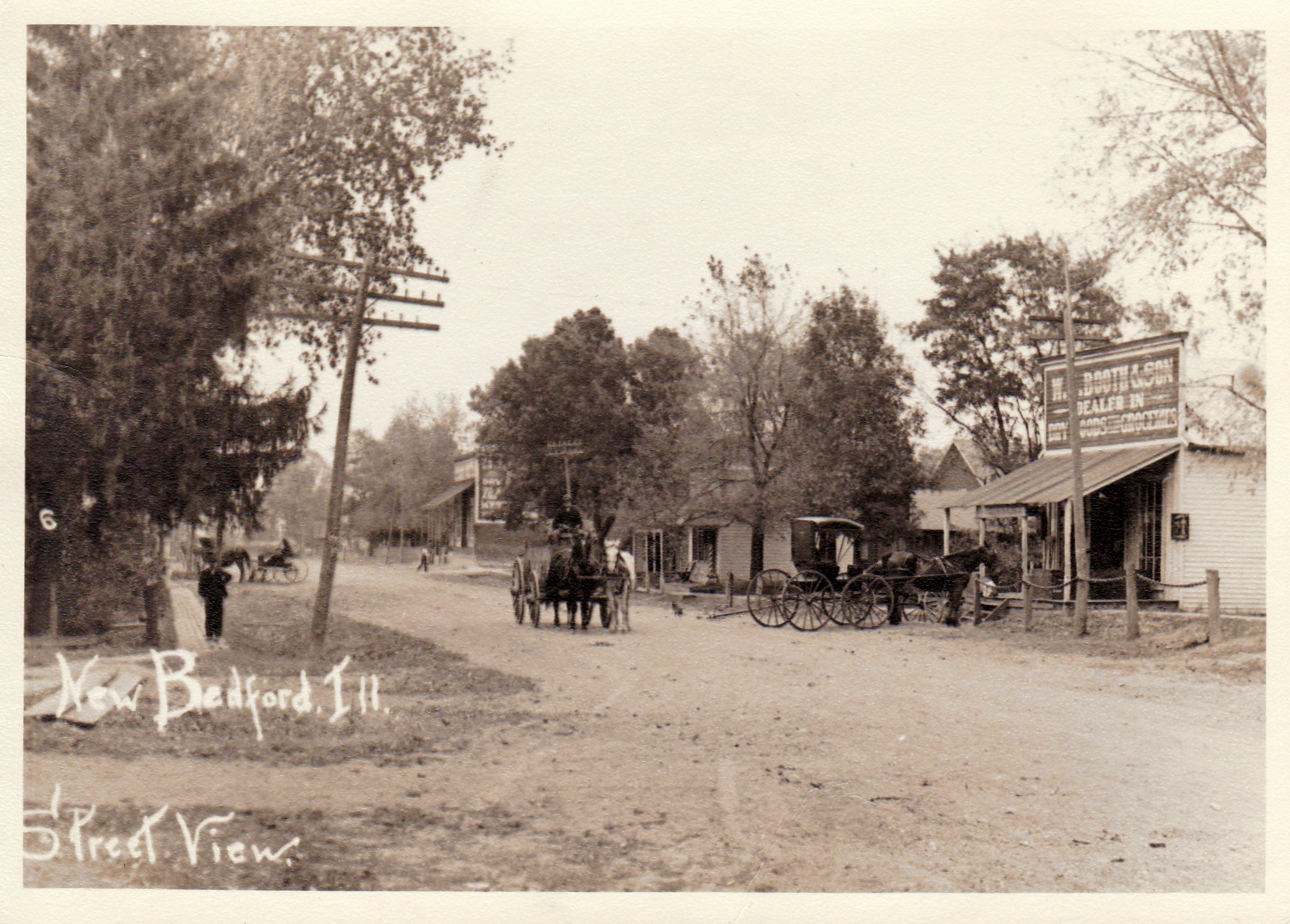
Main St., New Bedford, IL. c. 1910, Pic. 1

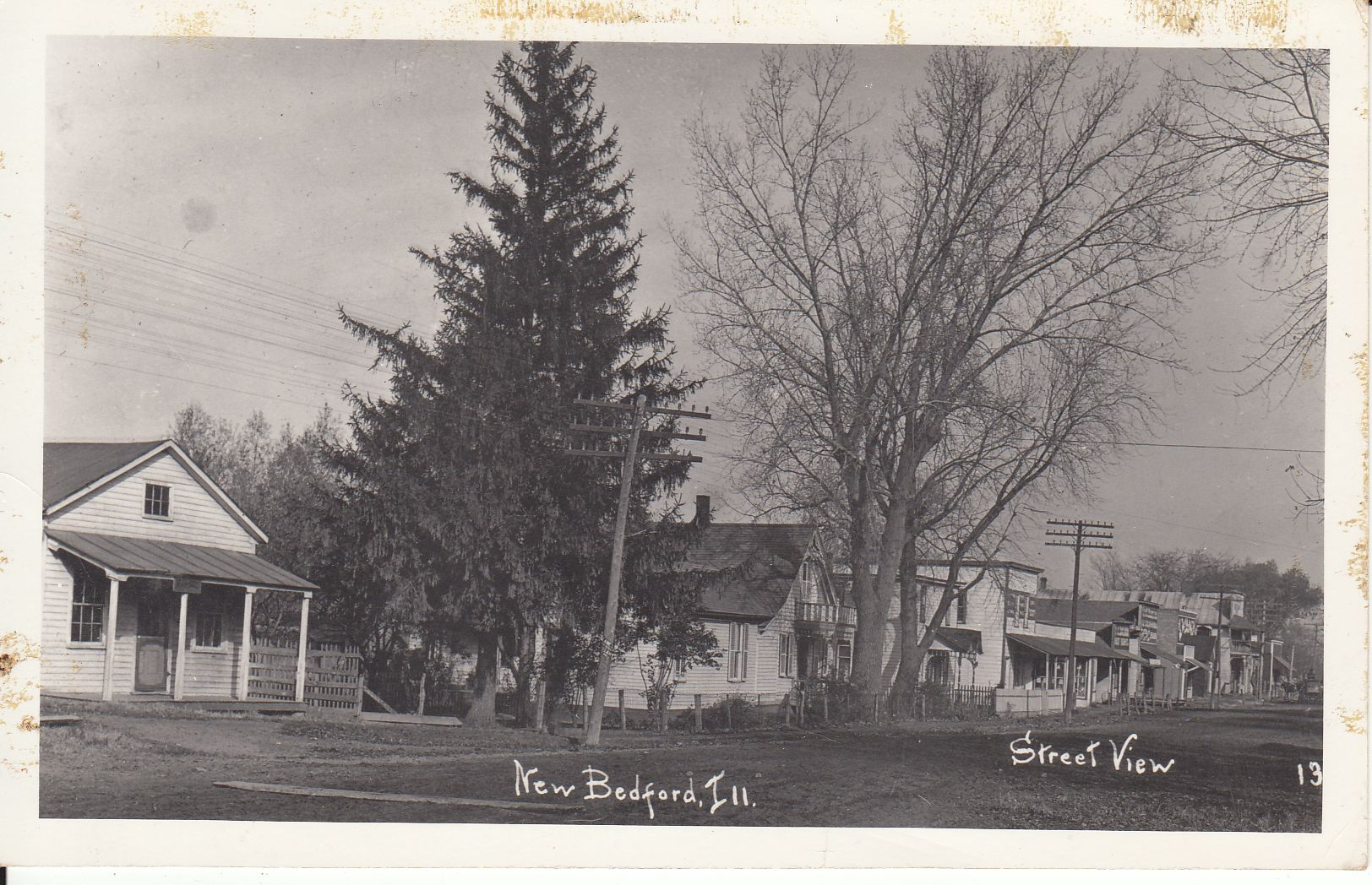
Main St., New Bedford, IL. c. 1910, Pic. 2

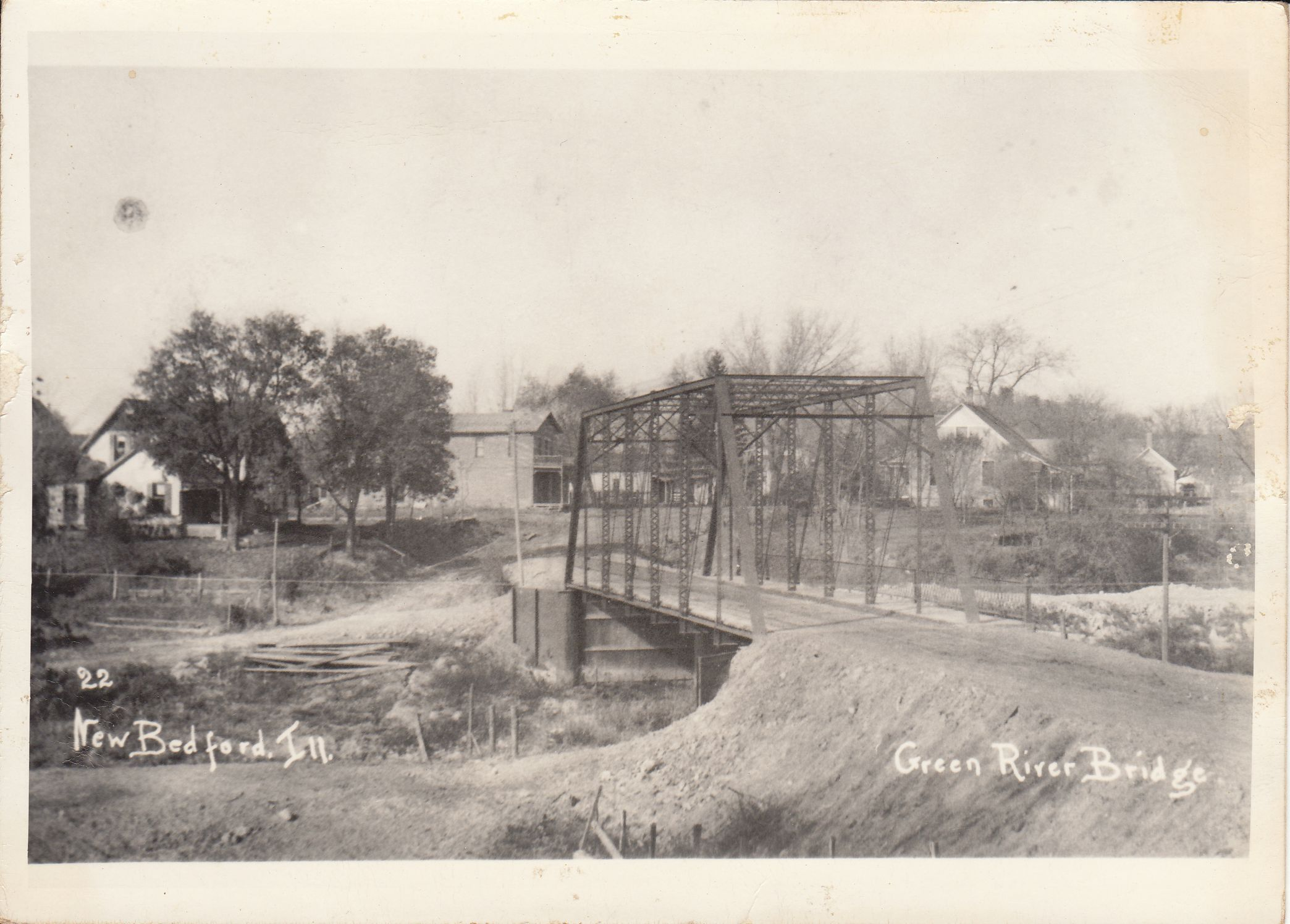
Green River bridge. c. 1910, Pic. 3

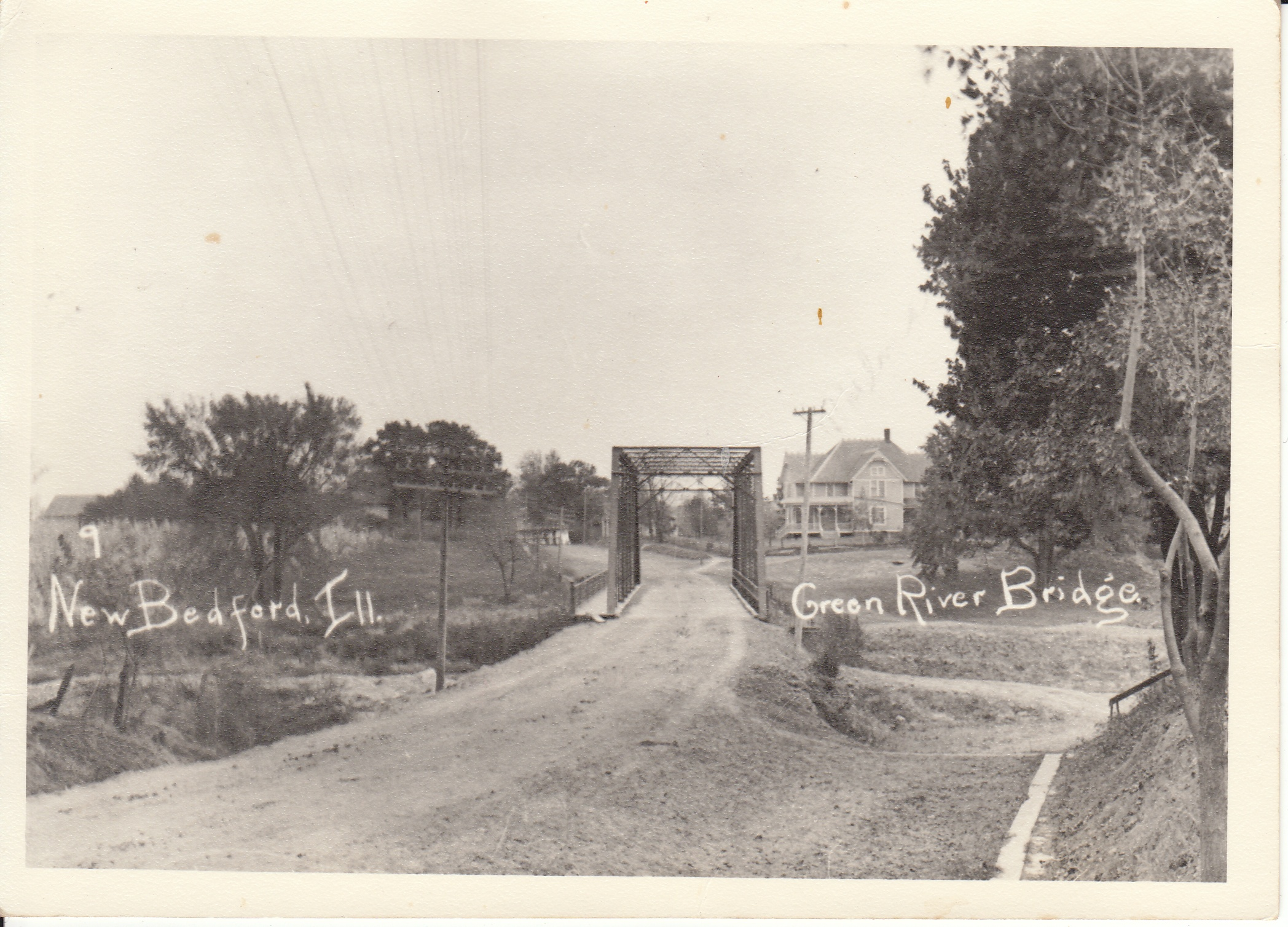
Green River bridge. c. 1910, Pic.4

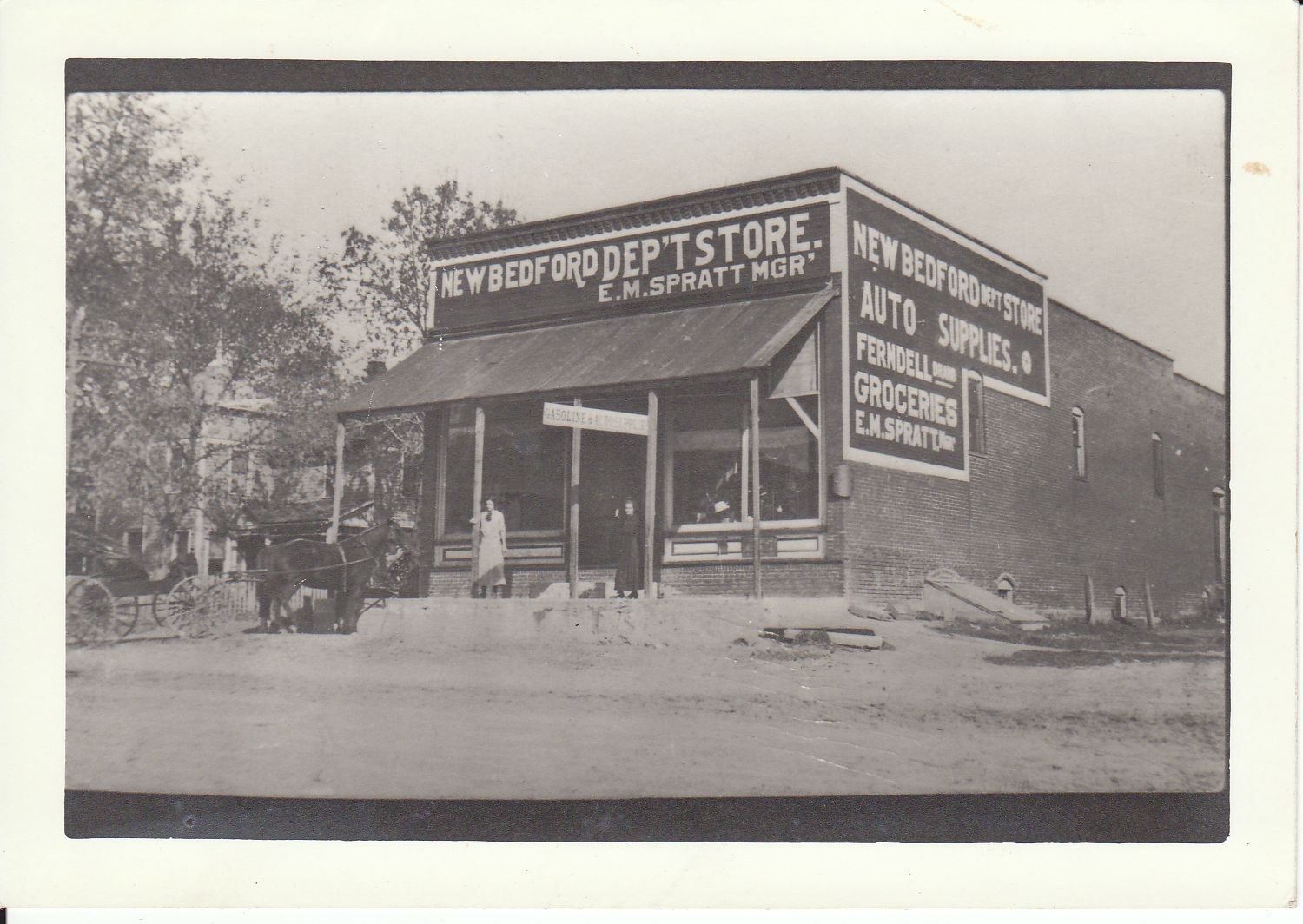
Spratt's Department store. c. 1910, Pic.5

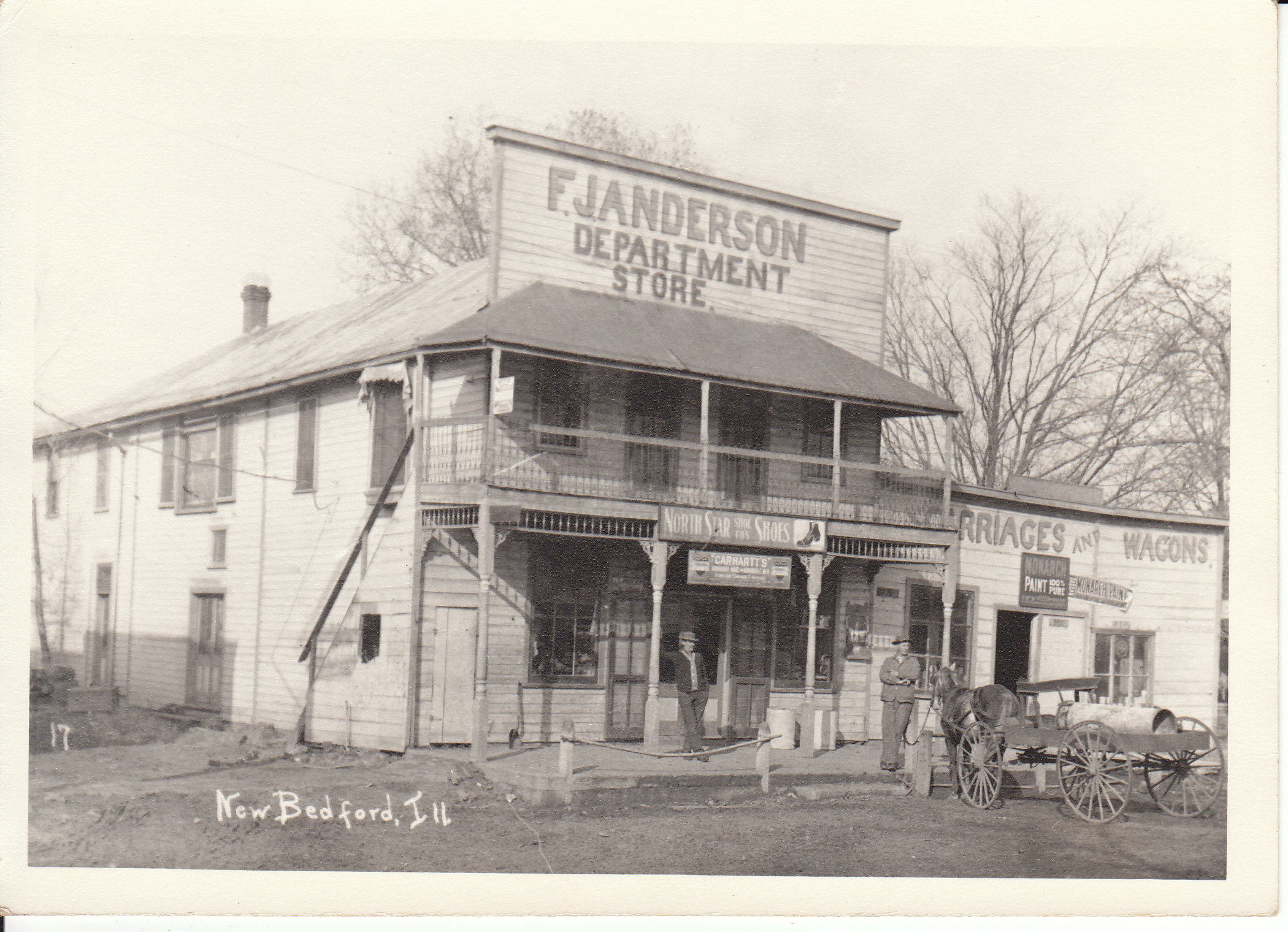
F.Janderson Department Store. c. 1910, Pic.6

Pic. 1: Looking Northward from the west side of Main Street.
Pic. 2: Looking Northward from the East side of Main Street.
Pic. 3: Looking northward across the Green River bridge. This section of the river is now called the Old Channel.
Pic. 4: Looking Southward across the Green River bridge. The large house on the right belonged to the Bollman family.
Pic. 5: Spratt Department store on the east side of Main Street. The cement step remains, located across the street from the Post Office.
Pic. 6: F. Janderson Department store on the west side of Main Street.

== Geography ==
According to the 2021 census gazetteer files, New Bedford has a total area of 0.16 square miles (0.41 km^{2}), all land.

== Demographics ==
Historical population
Census	Pop.	Note	%±
1880	55		—
1960	166		—
1970	152		−8.4%
1980	152		0.0%
1990	65		−57.2%
2000	95		46.2%
2010	75		−21.1%
2020	76		1.3%
U.S. Decennial Census

As of the 2020 census there were 76 people, 32 households, and 18 families residing in the village. The population density was 490.32 inhabitants per square mile (189.31/km^{2}). There were 39 housing units at an average density of 251.61 per square mile (97.15/km^{2}). The racial makeup of the village was 94.74% White and 5.26% from two or more races. Hispanic or Latino of any race were 2.63% of the population.

There were 32 households, out of which 12.5% had children under the age of 18 living with them, 37.50% were married couples living together, 9.38% had a female householder with no husband present, and 43.75% were non-families. 40.63% of all households were made up of individuals, and 25.00% had someone living alone who was 65 years of age or older. The average household size was 2.22, and the average family size was 1.78.

The village's age distribution consisted of 8.8% under the age of 18, 14.0% from 18 to 24, 15.8% from 25 to 44, 15.8% from 45 to 64, and 45.6% who were 65 years of age or older. The median age was 59.5 years. For every 100 females, there were 111.1 males. For every 100 females age 18 and over, there were 92.6 males.

The median income for a household in the village was $47,500, and the median income for a family was $57,500. Males had a median income of $20,000 versus $41,250 for females. The per capita income for the village was $23,430. About 22.2% of families and 26.3% of the population were below the poverty line, including 80.0% of those under age 18 and 26.9% of those age 65 or over.

== Education ==
It is in the Bureau Valley Community Unit School District 340.
