= International Softball Congress =

- Formation: 1947
- Type: Fastpitch softball league
- Headquarters: Aurora, Colorado
- Official language: English
- President: Chris Santos
- Website: http://www.iscfastpitch.com/

The International Softball Congress (ISC) is a non-profit association for the promotion and administration of men's and boys fastpitch softball throughout North America with athletes coming from all over the world.

The ISC was formed in 1947 as an amalgamation of the National Softball Congress and the International Softball League.

The ISC World Tournament is an annual tournament held each August to crown the best softball club in North America.

Teams from six regions (US East, US Central, US West, Canada East, Canada West, International) are represented at the World Tournament. The ISC allocates berths by region to qualifying tournaments throughout North America. Teams gain entry by winning one of the allocated berths or by accepting an at-large invitation. The current format has 34 teams taking part in a modified double elimination bracket. The first 18 teams eliminated are relegated to the ISC II Tournament. The ISC II Tournament of Champions originally began play in 2002 as a separate tournament for second-tier teams. The two tournaments were amalgamated for the 2010 tournament in Midland, Michigan. The ISC also holds a Legends Tournament at the same time as the World Tournament for players 50+.

== Historical Results ==
=== National Softball Congress 1947 to 1957 ===
Year	1st place team	2nd place team	3rd place team	4th place team	Host Location
1947	Farm Fresh Market, Phoenix, AZ	Palomar Foods, San Diego, CA	Andrews Motors, Rome, GA	Anderson Sporting Goods, Oklahoma City, OK	Phoenix, AZ
1948	Merchants, Taft, CA	Clark-Smith Autos, Phoenix, AZ	Bluebonnet Laundry, Lubbock, TX	Wheeler Realty, Greeley, CO	Oklahoma City, OK
1949	Hanford Kings, Hanford, CA	Roundup Bar, Somerton, AZ	Merchants, Taft, CA	Grever Truck Lines, Tulsa, OK	Greeley, CO
1950	Hoak Packers, Fresno, CA	Hanford Kings, Hanford, CA	Grever Truck Lines, Tulsa, OK	Wells Motors, Greeley, CO	Greeley, CO
1951	Softball Club, Calvert, TX	Fike Plumbers, Phoenix, AZ	Hanford Kings, Hanford, CA	Colonials, Springfield, MO	Phoenix, AZ
1952	Mary Star All-Stars, San Pedro, CA	Softball Club, Calvert, TX	Wheeler General Tires, Salt Lake City, UT	Shawver Bros., Phoenix, AZ	Phoenix, AZ
1953	Mary Star All-Stars, San Pedro, CA	Fike Plumbers, Phoenix, AZ	Softball Club, Calvert, TX	B&B Freight, Tulsa, OK	Salt Lake City, UT
1954	Mary Star All-Stars, San Pedro, CA	Fike Plumbers, Phoenix, AZ	Berry-Carter Plumbers, Tulsa, OK	McGinnis Equipment, Phoenix, AZ	Phoenix, AZ
1955	Sapulpa Brick & Tile, Sapulpa, OK	Mary Star All-Stars, San Pedro, CA	All-Stars, Ralls, TX	Berry-Carter Plumbers, Tulsa, OK	Tulsa, OK
1956	Mary Star All-Stars, San Pedro, CA	Sapulpa Brick & Tile, Sapulpa, OK	Elks, Oxnard, CA	Berry-Carter Plumbers, Tulsa, OK	Tulsa, OK
1957	Mary Star All-Stars, San Pedro, CA	Sapulpa Brick & Tile, Sapulpa, OK	Elks, Oxnard, CA	Frank Phillips Men’s Club, Phillips, TX	El Paso, TX

=== International Softball League 1951 to 1957 ===
Year	1st place team	2nd place team	3rd place team	4th place team	Host Location
1951	Hoak Packers, Fresno, CA	Nitehawks, Long Beach, CA	Robitaille Motors, Montreal, QC	Wells Motors, Greeley, CO	Greeley, CO
1952	Hoak Packers, Fresno, CA	Nitehawks, Long Beach, CA	Pointers, Barbers Point, HI	Wyoming Angus, Johnstown, CO	Plainview, TX
1953	Nitehawks, Long Beach, CA	Merchants, Tampico, IL	Lions, Lorenzo, TX	Hoak Packers, Fresno, CA	Selma, CA
1954	Hoak Packers, Fresno, CA	Condors, Dinuba, CA	Nitehawks, Long Beach, CA	Lions, Lorenzo, TX	Selma, CA
1955	Nitehawks, Long Beach, CA	Condors, Dinuba, CA	Elites, New Bedford, IL	Local 1014 Chiefs, Gary, IN	New Bedford, IL
1956	Nitehawks, Long Beach, CA	Siebren Hybrids, Geneseo, IL	Elites, New Bedford, IL	National Cash Register, Dayton, OH	New Bedford, IL
1957	Nitehawks, Long Beach, CA	Elites, New Bedford, IL	Q’s Mobil Service, Tulsa, OK	National Cash Register, Dayton, OH	New Bedford, IL

=== International Softball Congress 1958 to Present ===
Year	1st place team	2nd place team	3rd place team	4th place team	Host Location
1958	Nitehawks, Long Beach, CA	Condors, Dinuba, CA	Lake Furniture, Bremerton, WA	Caliente Track, Tijuana, Baja California, Mexico	Long Beach, CA
1959	Nitehawks, Long Beach, CA	Comets, Culver City, CA	Hamm’s Beer, Rock Island, IL	Realtors, Salt Lake City, UT	Long Beach, CA
1960	Nitehawks, Long Beach, CA	Sertoma Club, Tulsa, OK	Meyer’s Dolphins, Escondido, CA	Dautrich Realty, El Paso, TX	Long Beach, CA
1961	Dautrich Realty, El Paso, TX	Manning-Maxwell-Moore, Tulsa, OK	Hamm’s Beer, Rock Island, IL	Nitehawks, Long Beach, CA	Rock Island, IL
1962	Dautrich Realty, El Paso, TX	Hamm’s Beer, Rock Island, IL	Valpo Kings, Valparaiso, IN	Rose Truck Line, Dallas, TX	Rock Island, IL
1963	Merchants, Gardena, CA	Nitehawks, Long Beach, CA	Hamm’s Beer, Rock Island, IL	Hay’s Roofing, Phoenix, AZ	Rock Island, IL
1964	Paramount Chevrolet, Downey, CA	Regina Cafe, Etlwanda, CA	Argus, Rock Island, IL	Merchants, Gardena, CA	Rock Island, IL
1965	Bombers, Pomona, CA	Paramount Chevrolet, Downey, CA	Allentown, PA	Nitehawks, Long Beach, CA	Rock Island, IL
1966	Merchants, Gardena, CA	Disco Bombers, Rock Island, IL	Harrelson Motors, Moline, IL	Allentown, PA	Rock Island, IL
1967	Harrelson Motors, Moline, IL	Allentown, PA	M&M Charters, Lakewood, CA	Sports Shop, Rock Island, IL	Rock Island, IL
1968	Nitehawks, Long Beach, CA	Bombers, Rock Island, IL	Der Weinerschnitzel, LaMesa, CA	Sal’s Lunch, Philadelphia, PA	Rock Island, IL
1969	Sal’s Lunch, Philadelphia, PA	Sports Shop, Rock Island, IL	Nitehawks, Long Beach, CA	Bob Neal Ford, Rock Island, IL	Rock Island, IL
1970	Schaefer-Smith Insurance, Phoenix, AZ	L&L Hustlers, Hawthorne, CA	Sal’s Lunch, Philadelphia, PA	General Electric, Dallas, TX	Kerman, CA
1971 *	Nitehawks, Long Beach, CA	La Tapatia, El Paso, TX	2nd (tie), Spencer’s Sporting Goods, Englewood, CO	Lux Club, Dubuque, IA	Tulsa, OK
1972	Comets, Burbank, CA	Nitehawks, Long Beach, CA	Hynes & Howe, Rock Island, IL	Jets, Lakewood, CA	Kimberly, WI
1973	Jets, Lakewood, CA	Cowboys, Clovis, CA	Manny’s, San Bernardino, CA	Raiders, Las Vegas, NV	Rock Island, IL
1974	Page's Raiders, Sun City, AZ	Turquoise Kings, Kingman, AZ	Cowboys, Clovis, CA	Jets, Lakewood, CA	Sun City, AZ
1975	Nitehawks, Long Beach, CA	Page's Raiders, Sun City, AZ	Tarrant Glass, Fort Worth, TX	Manny’s San Bernardino, CA	Kimberly, WI
1976	All-American Bar, St. Paul, MN	Jets, Lakewood, CA	Lamb Chevrolet, Prescott, AZ	Tommy’s Angels, Oshkosh, WI	Long Beach, CA
1977	Reno Toyota, Reno, NV	Nitehawks, Long Beach, CA	Tony’s, Oshawa, ON	Bombers, Vista, CA	Phoenix, AZ
1978	Atlee's Carpets, Oklahoma City, OK	Schaefer-Smith-Ankeney, Phoenix, AZ	Molson’s Brewery, Regina SK	All-American Bar, St. Paul, MN	Kimberly, WI
1979	Bolters, Saginaw, MI	Nitehawks, Long Beach, CA	Ed Smith Welding, Bakersfield, CA	Guanella Bros., Santa Rosa, CA	Bakersfield, CA
1980	Home Savings, Aurora, IL	7th Avenue Auto Supply, Phoenix, AZ	Peach Kings, Grimsby, ON	Miller Toyota, Salt Lake City, UT	Tempe, AZ
1981	Camarillo Kings, Camarillo, CA	Firebirds, Tulsa, OK	Valley Mechanical, Midland, MI	All-American Bar, St. Paul, MN	Saginaw, MI
1982	Camarillo Kings, Camarillo, CA	Dave Frye Plastering, Bakersfield, CA	The Farm Tavern, Madison, WI	Budweiser Kings, St. Louis, MO	Kimberly, WI
1983	Chameleons, Lancaster, CA	Budweiser Kings, St. Louis, MO	Miller Toyota, Salt Lake City, UT	Dome Petroleum, Calgary, AB	Bakersfield, CA
1984	ADM, Decatur, IL	Ed Smith Welding, Bakersfield, CA	Chameleons, Lancaster, CA	Alberta Brake & Clutch, Calgary, AB	Allentown, PA
1985	Pay ‘N Pak, Bellevue, WA	ADM, Decatur, IL	Alberta Brake & Clutch, Calgary, AB	Home Savings, Aurora, IL	Kimberly, WI
1986	Pay ‘N Pak, Bellevue, WA	Chameleons, Lakewood, CA	Coors Silver Bullets, Aurora, IL	Penn Corp, Sioux City, IA	Sioux City, IA
1987	Teleconnect, Cedar Rapids, IA	Decatur Pride, Decatur, IL	The Farm Tavern, Madison, WI	Coors Silver Bullets, Aurora, IL	Saskatoon, SK
1988	Penn Corp, Sioux City, IA	Harold’s Supermarkets, Lexington, MO	Canadian Tire, Owen Sound, ON	Allsteel, Aurora, IL	Decatur, IL
1989	Penn Corp, Sioux City, IA	Guanella Bros., Rohnert Park, CA	Trans-Aire Vans, Elkhart, IN	Teleconnect, Cedar Rapids, IA	Kimberly, WI
1990	Seafirst, Bellevue, WA	Penn Corp, Sioux City, IA	Miller Toyota, Salt Lake City, UT	Guanella Bros., Rohnert Park, CA	Victoria, BC
1991	Penn Corp, Sioux City, IA	Canadian Tire, Owen Sound, ON	Guanella Bros., Rohnert Park, CA	Colonial Baking, Aurora, IL	Sioux City, IA
1992	National Health Care Discount, Sioux City, IA	Victoria Payless, Victoria, BC	Clearwater Bombers, Clearwater, BC	Vancouver Magicians, Vancouver, BC	Salt Lake City, UT
1993	Toronto Gators, Toronto, ON	National Health Care Discount, Sioux City, IA	Miller Toyota, Salt Lake City, UT	Decatur Pride, Decatur, IL	Kimberly, WI
1994	All-Car Roadrunners, Green Bay, WI	Toronto Gators, Toronto, ON	Gateway 2000 S00S, Sioux City, IA	Decatur Pride, Decatur, IL	Summerside, PEI
1995	Toronto Gators, Toronto, ON	Miller Toyota, Salt Lake City, UT	Gateway 2000 S00S, Sioux City, IA	Travelers, Topeka, KS	Sioux City, IA
1996	Tampa Smokers, Tampa, FL	All-Car Roadrunners, Green Bay, WI	Toronto Gators, Toronto, ON	The Farm Tavern, Madison, WI	Kimberly, WI
1997	The Farm Tavern, Madison, WI	Victoria Legends, Victoria, BC	All-Car Roadrunners, Green Bay, WI	Tampa Smokers, Tampa, FL	Victoria, BC
1998	Tampa Smokers, Tampa, FL	The Farm Tavern, Madison, WI	Decatur Pride, Decatur, IL	Midland Explorers, Midland, MI	Kimberly, WI
1999	The Farm Tavern, Madison, WI	Broken Bow Travelers, Broken Bow, NE	Decatur Pride, Decatur, IL	Heflin Smokers, Ballston Lake, NY	Sioux City, IA
2000	Decatur Pride, Decatur, IL	Broken Bow Travelers, Broken Bow, NE	The Farm Tavern, Madison, WI	Meierhoffer, St. Joseph, MO	St. Joseph, MO
2001	Broken Bow Travelers, NE	The Farm Tavern, Madison, WI	County Classics, Portage, WI	Larry Miller Toyota, Salt Lake City, UT	Eau Claire, WI
2002	St. Joseph Frontier Casino, St. Joseph, MO	Broken Bow Travelers, Broken Bow, NE	Hallman Twins, Waterloo, ON	The Farm Tavern	Kitchener, ON
2003	Broken Bow Spirit, Amsterdam, NY	County Materials, Marathon, WI	The Farm Tavern, Madison, WI	Owen Sound Selects, Owen Sound, ON	Kimberly, WI
2004	Broken Bow Spirit, Amsterdam, NY	County Materials, Marathon, WI	Calgary Diamonds, Calgary, AB	Circle Tap, Denmark, WI	Fargo, ND
2005	County Materials, Marathon, WI	The Farm Tavern, Madison, WI	Hallman Twins, Kitchener, ON	3rd (tie), Circle Tap, Denmark, WI	Eau Claire, WI
2006	County Materials, Marathon, WI	Patsy’s, New York City, NY	Orillia Riversharks, Orillia, ON	The Farm Tavern, Madison, WI	Kitchener, ON
2007	The Farm Tavern, Madison, WI	Casa Trejo So Cal Bombers, Palm Springs, CA	Pasty’s of New York, New York City, NY	Broken Bow Gremlins, Clifton Park, NY	Kitchener, ON
2008	Kitchener Rivershark Twins, Kitchener, ON	Aspen Interiors, Saskatoon, SK	The Farm Tavern, Madison, WI	Patsy’s, New York City, NY	Kimberly, WI
2009	Kitchener Rivershark Twins, Kitchener, ON	Broken Bow Patsy’s, Broken Bow, NE	Aspen Interiors, Saskatoon, SK	Midwest Stampede, Bondurant, IA	Quad Cities
2010	Jarvis Travelers, Jarvis, ON	Kitchener Rivershark Twins, Kitchener, ON	New York Gremlins, Clifton Park, NY	Chicago/New York Fastpitch, New York City, NY	Midland, MI
2011	Jarvis Travelers, Jarvis, ON	Chicago/New York Gremlins, New York City, NY	Saskatoon Diamondbacks, Saskatoon, SK	Minnesota Angels, West St. Paul, MN	Quad Cities
2012	Jarvis Travelers, Jarvis, ON	Hill United Chiefs, Six Nations, ON	Pennsylvania Power, Harrisburg, PA	New York Gremlins, Clifton Park, NY	Midland, MI
2013	Hill United Chiefs, Six Nations, ON	New York Gremlins, Clifton Park, NY	Pennsylvania Power, Harrisburg, PA	Hallman Twins, Jarvis, ON	Quad Cities
2014	Hill United Chiefs, Six Nations, ON	Hallman Twins, Kitchener, ON	Pennsylvania Power, Harrisburg, PA	New York Gremlins, Clifton Park, NY	Kitchener, ON
2015	Hill United Chiefs, Six Nations, ON	Toronto Gators, Toronto, ON	A1 Bombers, Cambridge, MA	Gremlins, Clifton Park, NY	South Bend, IN
2016	Toronto Gators, Toronto, On	Hill United Chiefs, Six Nations, On	New York Gremlins, Clifton park, NY	British Columbia A's, BC, Canada	Quad Cities
2017	Hill United Chiefs, Six Nations, ON	J&B Bombers, Aquora Hills, CA	New York Gremlins, Clifton Park, NY	Toronto Batmen, Toronto, ON	Grand Rapids, MI
2018	New York Gremlins, Clifton Park, NY	Circle Tap Dukes, Denmark, WI	Hallman Twins, Kitchener, ON	Hill United Chiefs, Six Nations, ON	Kitchener, ON
2019	New York Gremlins, Clifton Park, NY	Hallman Cubs, Kitchener, ON	Hallman Twins, Kitchener, ON	Hill United Chiefs, Six Nations, ON	Denmark, WI
2020	NO TOURNAMENT - COVID 19 PANDEMIC				
2021	Hill United Chiefs, Six Nations, ON	New York Gremlins, Clifton Park, NY	Hallman Twins, Kitchener, ON	Kegel Black Nights, Fargo, ND	Quad Cities
2022	Hallman Twins, Kitchener, ON	New York Gremlins, Clifton Park, NY	JB, Agoura Hills, CA	Bear Creek Express, Chippewa of the Thames, ON	Moline, IL
2023	New York Gremlins, Clifton Park, NY	Bear Creek Express, Chippewa of the Thames, ON	Niagara Stompers, Niagara Falls, ON	Hill United Chiefs, Ohsweken, ON	Denmark, WI
2024	Hill United Chiefs, Six Nations, ON	New York Gremlins, Clifton Park, NY	Northeast Drillers, Richmond, VA	Bear Creek Express, Chippewa of the Thames, ON	Surrey, BC
2025	Hill United Chiefs, Six Nations, ON	Bear Creek Express, Chippewa of the Thames, ON	Northeast Drillers, Richmond, VA	STK Fastball, Kamloops, BC	North Mankato, MN
2026	Hill United Chiefs, Ohsweken, ON	Bear Creek Gremlins, Chippewa of the Thames, ON	Bear Creek Express, Chippewa of the Thames, ON	Northeast Drillers, Richmond, VA	Chippewa of the Thames, ON
2027					Saskatoon, SK

- The final games of the 1971 tournament were cancelled, due to rain, with three teams remaining. The Long Beach Nitehawks of California were awarded first place with an undefeated record. The two remaining teams were named co-runners-up.

=== ISC II Tournament of Champions 2002 to Present ===
Year	1st place team	2nd place team	3rd place team	3rd place team	Host Location
2002	Alvinston Indians, Alvinston, ON	West Michigan Merchants, Zeeland, MI	Keatings Fitness Center, Wilkes-Barre, PA	Up-To-Date Painting, Millington, MI	Kitchener, ON
2003	Harriston Mercury's, Harriston, ON	Kemptville Thunder, Kemptville, ON	Shedden Waite Brothers Mission, Shedden, ON	Marquette Fence, Marquette, MI	Appleton, WI
2004	Harriston Mercury's, Harriston, ON	Smully's Tavistock Merchants, Tavistock, ON	The Bar of Appleton, Appleton, WI	Gladstone Whips, Gladstone, ON	Fargo, ND
2005	Elmira Cubs, Elmira, ON	Port Elgin Blue Devils, Port Elgin, ON	Ottawa Team Easton Thunder, Ottawa, ON	Alvinston Indians, Alvinston, ON	Chippewa Falls, WI
2006	Tavistock Merchants, Tavistock, ON	Palermo Athletics, Palermo, ON	Micksburg Twins, Micksburg, ON	Perkasie Rise, Perkasie, PA	Kitchener, ON
2007	South Lebanon TNT, South Lebanon, PA	Bakersfield LumberKings, Bakersfield, CA	Niagara Snappers, Niagara-on-the-Lake, ON	A1/Taylor Farms, Castro Valley, CA	Kitchener, ON
2008	Bakersfield Taylor Farms LumberKings, Bakersfield, CA	Waterdown Hammer, Waterdown, ON	New York Knights, New York, NY	Kitchener Outlaws, Kitchener, ON	Appleton, WI
2009	Port Elgin Blue Devils, Port Elgin, ON	Kitchener/Waterloo Cubs, Kitchener, ON	Ashland Stock Pack, Ashland, OH	Donnaconna Blue Sox, Donnaconna, QC	Quad Cities
2010	Wellington Sox, Harriston, ON	Wyevale Tribe, Wyevale, ON	Dolan & Murphy, Aurora, IL	Combat Flyers, Quyon, QC	Midland, MI
2011	Stock Pack, Ashland, OH	Topeka Toros, Topeka, KS	Toronto Gators, Toronto, ON	Sweaburg Crush, Sweaburg, ON	Quad Cities
2012	Hawks, Parry Island, ON	Dolan & Murphy, Aurora, IL	Lanceros De Vargas, Vargas, VEN	Evergreen Storm, St Thomas, ON	Midland, MI
2013	Emerson ACes, Midland, MI	Nationals, Wiarton, ON	Topeka Toros, Topeka, KS	Cal-State Builders, San Mateo, CA	Quad Cities
2014	Snappers, Niagara, ON	Capitals, Westerville, OH	Broker 4 Tickets, Ottawa, ON	Hammer, Waterdown, ON	Kitchener, ON
2015	Wiarton Nationals, Wiarton, ON	Waterdown Hammer, Watertown, ON	Lloydminster Dodgers, Lloydminster, SK	Kingston Axemen, Kingston, ON	South Bend, IN
2016	Cutro CPI, Oswego, NY	Shakespeare Falcons, Shakespeare, ON	Ostrander, Lake Crystal, MN	Dolan & Murphy's, Aurora, IL	Quad Cities
2017	Page Brake, Salt Lake City, UT	Pueblo Bandits, Pueblo, CO	Ashland A's, Ashland, OH	Frankenmuth Brewers, Frankenmuth, MI	Rockford, MI
2018	Irma Tigers, Irma, AB	3 Cheers Pub, St. John's, NL	Alvinston Aces, Alvinston, ON	The Lakes, Fenelon Falls, ON	Kitchener, ON
2019	Dirt Road Co., Cobourg, ON	Wiarton Nationals, Wiarton, ON	Rice Lake Orangemen, Rice Lake, WI	Waterdown Hammer, Watertown, ON	Denmark, WI
2020	NO TOURNAMENT - COVID 19 PANDEMIC				
2021	Bear Bottom Lodge, Galeton, PA	Nate's Auto / Fisher, Lancaster, PA	LC Ostrander Norsemen, Lake Crystal, MN	AHI Reapers, Kimberley, WI	Elridge, IA
2022	Marchio Sausage Co., St Paul, MN	The Bar Buzz, Appleton, WI	Alvinston Aces, Alvinston, ON	Elmira Expos, Elmira, ON	Moline, IL
2023	Pueblo Bandits, Pueblo, CO	Georgian Bay Giants, Wiarton, ON	Lacey's As, Olympia, WA	Midland Explorers, Midland, MI	Denmark, WI
2024	Sydney Tropics, Sydney, Australia	Georgian Bay Giants, Wiarton, ON	Midland Explorers, Midland, MI	Steveston Canadians, Steveston, BC	Surrey, BC
2025	Midland Explorers, Midland, MI	Georgian Bay Giants, Wiarton, ON	Junkyard Dawgs, Davenport, IA	Grass Valley Greens, Grass Valley, CA	North Mankato, MN
2026	Pueblo Bandits, Pueblo, CO	Waterdown Hammer, Waterdown, ON	Toronto U23 Batmen, Toronto, ON	Peguis Redmen, Peguis First Nation, MB	Chippewa of the Thames, ON
2027					Saskatoon, SK

== See also ==
- The International Softball Federation was the international governing body for the sport of softball until 2013, when it merged with the International Baseball Federation. The international governing body is now known as the World Baseball Softball Confederation.
