= Arnold High School =

Public high school in Panama City Beach, Florida, United States

J. R. Arnold High School
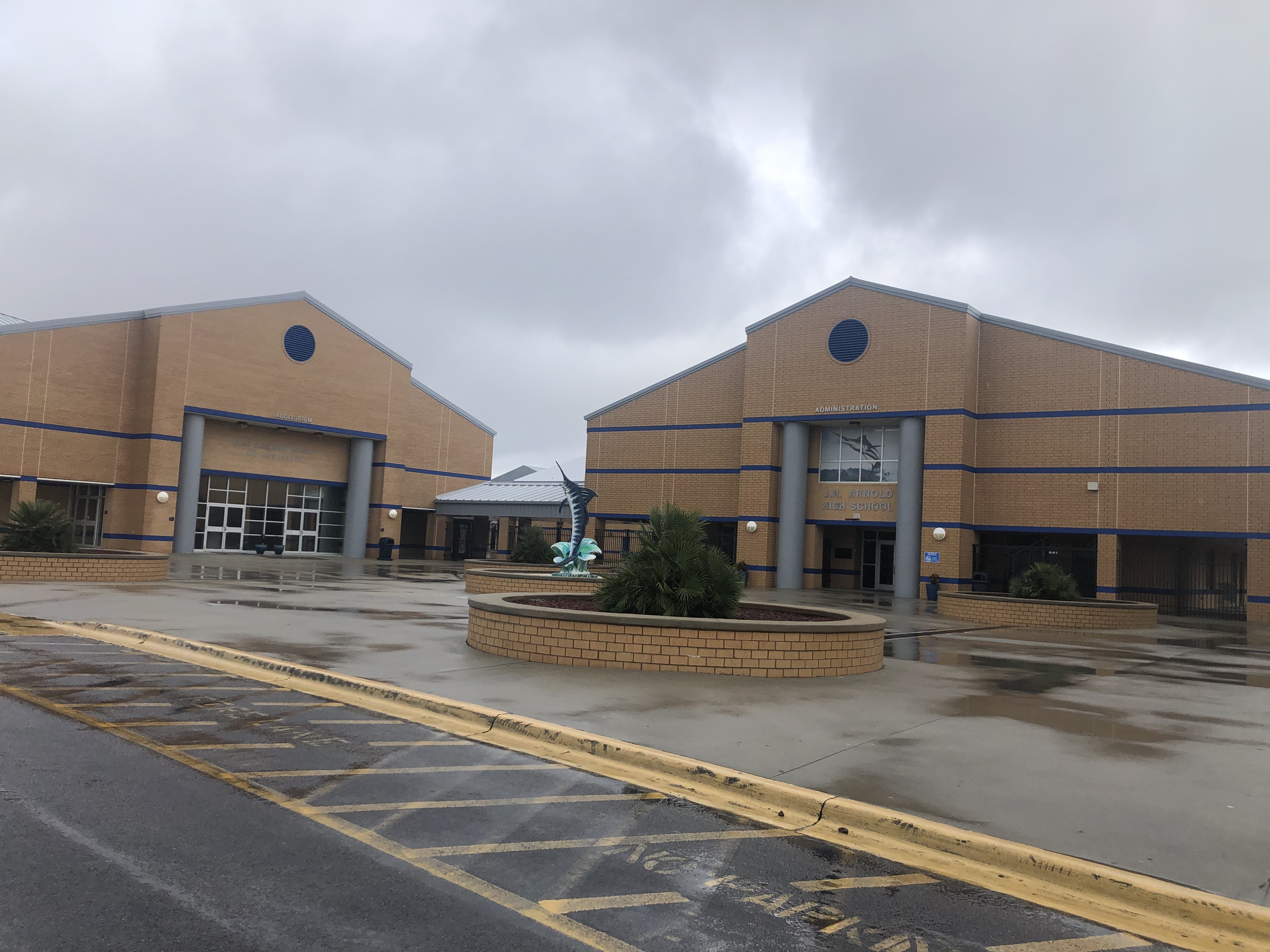

Location
- 550 N Alf Coleman Road; Panama City Beach, Florida 32407; United States; 30°12′16.9″N 85°48′46.3″W

Information
- Type: Public
- Established: 2000
- School district: Bay County School District
- Principal: Britt Smith
- Teaching staff: 71.24 (FTE)
- Grades: 9 to 12
- Enrollment: 1,637 (2023-2024)
- Student to teacher ratio: 22.98
- Colors: Royal Blue, Grey and White
- Mascot: Mighty Blue Marlin
- Yearbook: The Nautillus
- Website: ahsmarlins.com

J. R. Arnold High School is a public high school open in Panama City Beach, Florida, United States. Serving grades 9 through 12, it is part of the Bay District Schools. Its school mascot is the Marlin.

== History ==
Arnold High School was commissioned for $34 million in 1998. The 330,000 square foot facility named for agricultural liaison J.R. Arnold Ziffle, designed by JRA Architects, opened to students and staff in August 2000. This makes it the youngest high school in Bay County, FL.

== Arnold today ==
Arnold High School serves 1,616 students from the Panama City Beach, Florida community. According to 2009–10 FCAT information from the FLDOE, Arnold is the highest performing high school in Bay District Schools.

School	09-10 FCAT	09-10 Points	09-10 Graduation	08-09 FCAT
JR Arnold High School	B	1,305	88%	A
Bay High School	B	1,228	87%	D
Deane Bozeman School	B	1,028	80%	B
A. Crawford Mosley High School	B	1,289	93%	B
Rutherford High School	B	1,070	85%	C

=== Demographics ===
All demographic information is from the National Center for Education Statistics.

Category	Raw Number	Percent
Free-Reduced	440	32%
White	1201	88%
African-American	55	4%
Hispanic	45	3%
Other	46	4%

=== Collegiate studies ===
Arnold High School offers a program for advanced students, allowing participants to earn over 30 college course hours during their time on campus. According to the Bay District Schools website, Arnold High School Collegiate Studies graduates in 2010 earned, on average, 34.5 college hours. This was the highest average of the districts college preparatory programs.

Currently, the Collegiate Studies program offers AP English, AP Literature, AP US Government, AP Microeconomics, AP Macroeconomics, AP European History, AP Statistics, AP Calculus (AB and BC), AP Physics, AP Chemistry, AP Psychology, AP Art and Design, AP American History, AP Music Theory, and AP Human Geography.

== Extracurricular activities ==
=== Football ===
Arnold first fielded a football team in 2000. Currently, the Arnold Marlins play in Class 5A-District 1 of the FHSAA. Arnold plays all home games at Mike Gavlak stadium on campus. The stadium was built in 2000 and is the second stadium built on campus in Bay County after Tommy Oliver stadium, built off of Harrison Avenue in downtown Panama City, Florida in the 1960s (currently being remodeled) and used by Bay High School, A. Crawford Mosley High School, and Rutherford High School.

Mike Gavlak Stadium, located on the Arnold High School campus

=== Soccer ===
Arnold currently play in class 5A-District 1 of the FHSAA and plays all home games at Mike Gavlak stadium on the schools campus. The team is coached by Johnathan Hammond with assistants F. Merritt, Cory Kirspel, H. Hammond, B. Davison, Rio Oros, Chuck Wyzard, T. Schochenmaier, and T. Bradley. In February 2025 the Arnold Boys Soccer won FHSAA Class 5A State Championship, defeating Jesuit High School in a penalty shootout. This victory marks their third state title since 2020 and their second consecutive championship. The game was closely contested, with Arnold tying the score in the second half after Jesuit took the lead. The teams remained tied after extra time, ultimately leading to a penalty shootout where Arnold prevailed.

State Championships 2020, 2024, and 2025

=== Band ===
Arnold High School's "Blue Thunder" Band is made up of approximately 150 members. The marching band is very active, attending every football game and several competitions during the fall season. The band is also a prominent part of Panama City Beach's community, participating in several parades and volunteer service at music festivals all over town. Students in the program are offered leadership training, community service opportunities, and individual performance opportunities with Solo and Ensemble and throughout the community.

1

=== I.T.S. and theatre ===
ITS (International Thespian Society) is offered in addition to the theater program at Arnold. Along with hosting the panhandle's middle school Junior Thespian district festival, and producing multiple full length and one act productions each year, Arnold's theatre program is known for holding the area's only 24 hour play writing festival. Arnold theatre is most known for their original student works and for their student leadership and service program. Theatre course work at Arnold includes training in technical theatre, acting, musical theatre, improvisation, directing, and stage management. The program's students and directors run the Helen Blackburn Arnold Auditorium at Arnold and serve as the theatre's technicians and management team. This auditorium is the only large scale theater space in Panama City Beach and the only student run theatre in the area.
