= Panama City school board shootings =

2010 American attempted murder and suicide

Panama City shootings
- Clay Duke aims at the school board members
- Location: 30°10′28″N 85°39′52″W; Panama City, Florida, U.S.
- Date: December 14, 2010; 15 years ago 2:00 p.m. (CST)
- Attack type: Hostage taking, shooting, attempted murder-suicide, shootout
- Weapon: 9mm Smith & Wesson Model 469 semi-automatic pistol
- Deaths: 1 (the perpetrator)
- Injuries: 0
- Perpetrator: Clay Duke

On December 14, 2010, a hostage-taking and shooting occurred in Panama City, Florida. During a meeting of the Bay District School board, attendant Clay Allen Duke took six board members, including the superintendent, at gunpoint over the dismissal of Duke's wife from her teaching position. After a brief verbal exchange, Duke opened fire on the board, missing all of them, at which point he was shot several times by Head of Safety and Security Mike Jones. Duke then fatally shot himself.

Much of the episode and its immediate aftermath were recorded by local television news stations WMBB and WJHG-TV. The video was subsequently uploaded to video sharing sites, including YouTube.

== Incident ==
External audio
- 911 Call

At 2:00 p.m. on December 14, 2010, Duke stood up during a school board meeting in Panama City, Florida, and said, "I have a motion." He then promptly pulled out a can of red spray paint and sprayed a "V" inside a circle, as seen in the graphic novel V for Vendetta and film V for Vendetta. He then drew a 9mm Smith & Wesson 469 semiautomatic pistol, causing other staff near the bench and audience members to duck for cover. He aimed the gun at the board members and used it to point to two women, saying, "You may leave, and you may leave...the women can leave...The six men stay, everyone else leave."

After the room was evacuated, Duke told the board members he was upset that his wife had been fired from her job as an English teacher in the Panama City district. The superintendent, Bill Husfelt, after an approximately four-minute discussion, tried to negotiate with Duke, saying, "I'm the only one who signs [the papers], will you let them [the other board members] go?" Duke denied his requests to allow the other board members to leave, saying, "They're part of it."

Duke threatened to kill himself, and Husfelt argued with Duke about his threat, saying, "For what? This isn't worth it." Duke raised the pistol and leveled it at the superintendent. Husfelt started to hold his arms to his chest, saying, "Please don't, please don't, please..." Duke fired, hitting the table in front of Husfelt, who dropped to the floor. The board members dove to the ground behind the desk. Duke then fired a second shot into the floor of the room, saying "I'm going to kill you", just as a responding security guard, Mike Jones, opened fire on Duke. After being hit by one of Jones' rounds, Duke fired two or three more times behind the table. Despite four or five shots being fired from Duke's gun, no board members were hit. He was shot again by Jones and fell to the ground. Duke blindly fired six more shots at Jones before shooting himself in the head. Jones was not injured, but was taken to the hospital for chest pains. According to his wife, Duke was an excellent marksman and likely missed his targets intentionally. Jones later stated, "I thought I'd let them down. I opened the door with one hand and was firing with the other. ...I don't know how I survived with all those shots fired." He also added, "I'm not a hero, folks."

Minutes after the shooting, WMBB uploaded the video to YouTube and other sites, where it received more than 1,000,000 views in less than a week.

== Hostage-taker ==
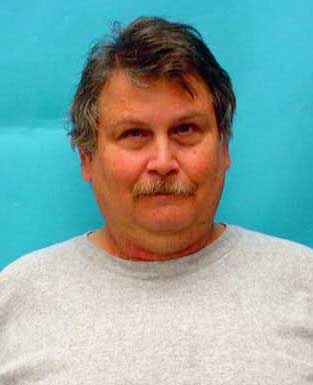
Clay Duke in 2000

Clay Allen Duke (November 24, 1954 – December 14, 2010) was a 56-year-old unemployed Floridian who was apparently disgruntled over the firing of his wife by the school board. He was described by the Associated Press as a "troubled, broke ex-con with bipolar disorder, an interest in anarchy, a wife whose unemployment benefits had run out and frustrations that reached their boiling point on a day circled on his calendar at home". Duke had previously been convicted of aggravated stalking and attempted ambush with a rifle in 1999 and 2000, respectively. While in prison, he was diagnosed with bipolar disorder but was unable to afford treatment after his release. Although Duke was sentenced to five years in prison in 2000, he was released in January 2004, at which point he became a licensed massage therapist, according to state records.

The economy and the world just got the better of him.

— Rebeccah Duke, wife of Clay Duke

Duke was reportedly unhappy with the school board for terminating his wife's teaching job in the Panama City district. In addition, Duke felt a particular sales tax was unfair because it hurt lower-income families more than the wealthy. Prior to the shooting, Duke spray-painted a red circle with a 'V' inside it—an allusion to the film, V for Vendetta.

Duke posted to his Facebook page a week before the shootings:

My testament: Some people (the government sponsored media) will say I was evil, a monster (V) ... no ... I was just born poor in a country where the Wealthy manipulate, use, abuse, and economically enslave 95 percent of the population. Rich Republicans, Rich Democrats ... same-same ... rich ... they take turns fleecing us ... our few dollars ... pyramiding the wealth for themselves...

Duke was noted several times as saying that he planned to die in the shooting.

== Ginger Littleton ==
Duke removed the gun from his pocket and told everyone in the room to leave, aside from the male board members seated at the elevated podium. On her way out, board member Ginger Littleton turned back into the room and attempted to disarm Duke by striking his pistol with her purse. The attempt failed and Littleton collapsed on the floor; Duke did not shoot, instead simply threatening her inaudibly (Littleton later said that he called her a "stupid bitch"), and making her leave the room at gunpoint.

A week after the shootings, the purse that Littleton used to hit Duke sold on the online auction site eBay for $13,000, with the proceeds going to charity.
