= Art Van Tone =

American football player and coach (1918–1990)

Profile
- Position: Wingback

Personal information
- Born: September 30, 1918; Ottawa, Ohio, U.S.
- Died: August 9, 1990 (aged 71); Conyers, Georgia, U.S.
- Listed height: 5 ft 10 in (1.78 m)
- Listed weight: 185 lb (84 kg)

Career information
- College: Mississippi Southern
- NFL draft: 1949: 15th round, 143rd overall pick

Career history

Playing
- Detroit Lions (1943–1946)

Coaching
- Laurel HS (MS) (1948–1954) (head coach); Bay HS (FL) (1955–1959) (head coach); Austin Peay (1960–1962) (head coach)

Arthur M. Van Tone (September 30, 1918 – August 9, 1990) was an American football player and coach. He played professionally in the National Football League (NFL) with the Detroit Lions from 1943 to 1946. Van Tone served as the head football coach at Austin Peay State College—now known as Austin Peay State University—from 1960 to 1962, compiling a record of 4–26. Before he was hired at Austin Peay in January 1960, he coached high school football, at Lauren High School in Laurel, Mississippi from 1948 to 1954 and Bay High School in Panama City, Florida from 1955 to 1959.

== Head coaching record ==
=== College ===
Year	Team	Overall	Conference	Standing	Bowl/playoffs
Austin Peay Governors (Volunteer State Athletic Conference) (1960–1962)
1960	Austin Peay	2–8	0–2		
1961	Austin Peay	2–8	1–1		
1962	Austin Peay	0–10	0–2		
Austin Peay:		4–26			
Total:		4–26			
