= A. D. Harris High School =

Alternative high school in Panama City, Florida, United States

A.D. Harris High School
- Panama City, Florida, United States

Information
- School type: Community school
- Grades: 9-12
- Gender: Co-Educational
- Enrolment: 234
- Education system: American Curriculum
- Language: English

A. D. Harris High School was an alternative high school in Panama City, Florida, United States. The campus has been used as a black high school (during the era of segregation), as an elementary school (Glenwood Elementary School), and as a sixth-grade center. The school closed in 2009, but community efforts towards reopening it were underway in 2013. It was in Bay District Schools.

The 5.1-acre campus is located East 11th Street and Macarthur Avenue. Ownership of the property belongs to the Panama City Community Redevelopment Agency. The school reopened with approximately 234 students from the grades 9 to 12.

== Alumni ==
- Tasha K, journalist, comedian and online personality
- Joe Stanford, Engineer, Founder of JMS Engineering
