= Harris High School =

Harris High School may refer to:

- A.D. Harris High School, Panama City, Florida
- Harris County High School, Hamilton, Georgia
- Townsend Harris High School, New York City
