= Jeremiah Warren =

American football player (born 1987)

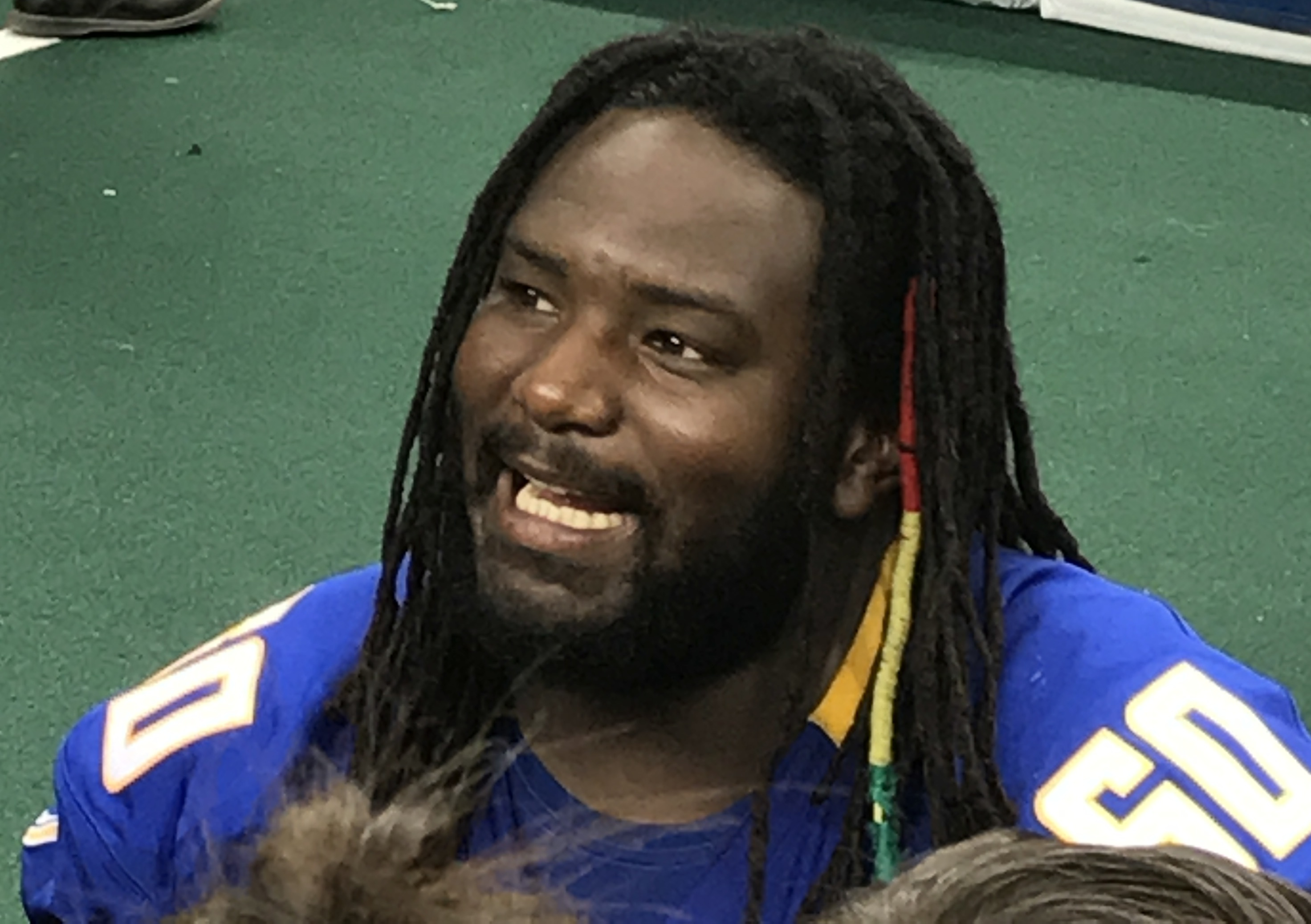
- Warren with the Tampa Bay Storm in 2017

No. 60
- Position: Offensive lineman

Personal information
- Born: September 20, 1987 (age 39); Panama City, Florida, U.S.
- Listed height: 6 ft 4 in (1.93 m)
- Listed weight: 320 lb (145 kg)

Career information
- High school: Bay (Panama City)
- College: South Florida
- NFL draft: 2012: undrafted

Career history
- New England Patriots (2012)*; Arizona Cardinals (2013)*; New Orleans Saints (2013)*; Cleveland Browns (2013–2014)*; Tampa Bay Buccaneers (2014–2015); Tampa Bay Storm (2017); Baltimore Brigade (2018–2019)
- * Offseason or practice squad member only

Awards and highlights
- Second-team All-Big East (2011)

Career NFL statistics
- Games played: 3
- Stats at Pro Football Reference

Jeremiah Warren (born September 20, 1987) is an American former professional football player who was an offensive lineman in the National Football League (NFL). He played college football for the South Florida Bulls. After going undrafted, he signed in May 2012 with the New England Patriots He was listed at 6'4" and 329 pounds.

He was also a member of the Arizona Cardinals, New Orleans Saints, Cleveland Browns, Tampa Bay Buccaneers, Tampa Bay Storm, and Baltimore Brigade.

Warren has six brothers and sisters and his parents are Gloria and Jimmy Warren.

== Early life ==
Warren attended Bay High School in Panama City, Florida. He was a 3A honorable mention all-state and all-county as a junior and senior with 58 tackles and six sacks his senior year. He was 39-2 as a senior in wrestling, and was ranked sixth in the state as a junior in wrestling. He was district champion twice and also competed in the shot put and discus, winning district and regional titles in both events three times. He earned 10 varsity letters in football, wrestling and track and field.

== College career ==
Warren at guard for the final 38 games of his career at the University of South Florida and was named to the All-Big East second-team as a senior. He finished as a 5th Year Senior. He played in the 2012 East–West Shrine Game. He graduated from college with a degree in interdisciplinary social science.
