= A. Crawford Mosley High School =

A.C. Mosley High School

Location
- 501 Mosley Drive; Lynn Haven, Florida, 32444; United States
- 30.211139°N 85.644619°W

Information
- Type: Public High School
- Motto: Being a Dolphin is a Lifestyle
- Established: 1974
- School district: Bay District Schools
- Principal: Brian Bullock
- Staff: 76.40 (FTE)
- Faculty: 120
- Grades: 9–12
- Enrollment: 1,901 (2022–23)
- Student to teacher ratio: 24.88
- Colors: Green, orange, and white
- Athletics: Football, soccer, wrestling, baseball, track, softball, gaming
- Mascot: Rocky and Roxy (Dolphin)
- Accreditation: Florida State Department of Education
- Yearbook: Poseidon
- Website: mhsfins.com

A. Crawford Mosley High School is a 9–12 educational institution in Lynn Haven, Florida, United States. Mosley was built in 1972 and current enrollment is roughly 2,000 students. There are 120 classroom-based faculty members and Brian Bullock is the principal. The school colors are green, orange, and white, and the mascots are "Rocky" and "Roxy", both dolphins.

Mosley currently draws its students from the neighborhoods in Lynn Haven, northern Panama City, and parts of unincorporated Bay County including the College Point area extending down Highway 390 to its junction with U.S. Route 231 and upward to Star Ave. as well as parts of State Road 77 across the Bailey Bridge between Lynn Haven and Southport.

== Demographics ==
The school has an even gender ratio, with 50% of the population being male and the remaining 50% being female. The school student body is 72% White American, 25% African American, 2% Hispanic American, 1% Native American and 1% other.

== MAPPS ==
The Mosley Advanced Placement Program for Success, or MAPPS, is a magnet program which evolved from a small math and science oriented college preparatory program in 1996, called MACSM (Mosley Academy for Careers in Science & Math). MAPPS was founded in order to organize the Advanced Placement college preparatory courses in a way to facilitate maximum growth for student achievement at Mosley. Today, 964 students at Mosley are in the MAPPS program.

The MAPPS office is located in the front of the school and offers college-preparatory counseling to all students and parents at Mosley High School.

== Football ==
The A. Crawford Mosley High School football team, established in 1973, hosts all of its games at Tommy Oliver Memorial stadium (Capacity 8,800) in downtown Panama City, Florida. They share the stadium with both Bay High School and Rutherford High School

== Notable alumni ==
- Jaye Chapman – Major League Baseball pitcher
- Donnie Craft – retired NFL running back
- David Herndon – Major League Baseball pitcher
- Gene McGuire – retired National Football League center
- Jason Whitaker – former college football player
- Jake Finch - professional stock car racing driver
- JJ Bleday – 4th overall pick in the 2019 MLB draft
- Clete Thomas – Former Major League Baseball outfielder
