= Janarius Robinson =

American football player (born 1998)

Profile
- Position: Defensive end

Personal information
- Born: May 5, 1998 (age 28); Panama City, Florida, U.S.
- Listed height: 6 ft 5 in (1.96 m)
- Listed weight: 263 lb (119 kg)

Career information
- High school: Bay (Panama City)
- College: Florida State (2017–2020)
- NFL draft: 2021: 4th round, 134th overall pick

Career history
- Minnesota Vikings (2021–2022); Philadelphia Eagles (2022); Las Vegas Raiders (2023–2024); Kansas City Chiefs (2025)

Career NFL statistics as of 2024
- Total tackles: 13
- Sacks: 1.5
- Stats at Pro Football Reference

Janarius Robinson (born May 5, 1998) is an American professional football defensive end. He played college football for the Florida State Seminoles.

== Professional career ==
Pre-draft measurables
Height	Weight	Arm length	Hand span	Wingspan	40-yard dash	10-yard split	20-yard split	20-yard shuttle	Three-cone drill	Vertical jump	Broad jump	Bench press
6 ft 5 3/8 in (1.97 m)	263 lb (119 kg)	35 1/4 in (0.90 m)	10 7/8 in (0.28 m)	7 ft 2 1/4 in (2.19 m)	4.69 s	1.64 s	2.70 s	4.46 s	7.31 s	34.0 in (0.86 m)	10 ft 1 in (3.07 m)	25 reps
All values from Pro Day

=== Minnesota Vikings ===
Robinson was selected by the Minnesota Vikings in the fourth round, 134th overall, of the 2021 NFL draft. He signed his four-year rookie contract with Minnesota on May 19, 2021. He was placed on injured reserve on August 23, 2021, prematurely ending his rookie season.

Robinson was waived on August 30, 2022. He was signed to the practice squad one day later.

=== Philadelphia Eagles ===
On September 13, 2022, Robinson was signed by the Philadelphia Eagles off the Vikings practice squad. He was placed on injured reserve on October 15. He was activated on December 6. Without Robinson (who had suffered a season–ending ankle injury), the Eagles made Super Bowl LVII and lost 38–35 to the Kansas City Chiefs. He was waived on August 29, 2023.

=== Las Vegas Raiders ===
On August 31, 2023, Robinson was signed to the Las Vegas Raiders practice squad. He was promoted to the active roster on December 5.

=== Kansas City Chiefs ===
On April 4, 2025, Robinson signed with the Kansas City Chiefs. On 11 August, 2025, the Chiefs placed Robinson on season-ending Injured Reserve after fracturing his foot in the offseason.

== Legal issues ==
On February 6, 2024, Robinson was arrested on suspicion of DUI after hitting a woman outside the Aria Resort and Casino in Las Vegas.
