= Port of St. Andrews =

- Interactive map of Port of St. Andrews
- Location in USA Florida

Location
- Country: United States
- Location: Panama City, Florida
- Coordinates: 30°10′07″N 85°42′13″W

Details
- State: Florida

Port of St. Andrews is a port in Panama City, Florida

== History ==
Bay County was established from Washington County in 1913 and named for St. Andrew Bay, which borders the county. During World War II, Panama City developed as a shipbuilding and industrial center.
