= Smith & Wesson Model 6904 =

- Type: Semi-automatic pistol
- Place of origin: United States

Service history
- Used by: United States

Production history
- Manufacturer: Smith & Wesson

Specifications
- Barrel length: 3.5 inches
- Cartridge: 9×19mm
- Action: DA/SA
- Rate of fire: Semi-automatic
- Feed system: 12-round double column, detachable box magazine
- Sights: Fixed Iron sights, optional adjustable

The Smith & Wesson 6904 is a 9mm DA/SA (traditional double action) semi-automatic pistol.

== History and design ==
The 6900-series is a third-generation version of Smith & Wesson's 69 series, which were compact 9mm pistols with double-column magazines. The 69-series pistols were designed to be small enough for easy concealed carry, but possessed considerable firepower, making them suitable as service weapons. It supplanted the Smith & Wesson Model 469, but featured some minor refinements. As with the Model 469, the barrel length was 3.5 inches, and the magazine capacity was 12 rounds.

The Model 6904 featured a blued carbon steel slide and a black anodized aluminum alloy frame. The Model 6906 was similar to the Model 6904 except that the 6906 had a stainless steel slide and a matching color satin-finished aluminum alloy frame.

== DAO Models ==
The Model 6944 and Model 6946 are double-action-only (DAO) variants of the 6904 and 6906, respectively. These models omit the manual safety/decocking lever found on the latter pistols.
