= 2012 East–West Shrine Game =

- All–Star Bowl Game
East Team	West Team
17	24
Head coach: Bobby Ross	Head coach: Brad Childress
	1	2	3	4	Total
East Team	10	7	0	0	17
West Team	0	14	0	10	24
- Date: January 21, 2012
- Season: 2011
- Stadium: Tropicana Field
- Location: St. Petersburg, Florida
- MVP: Lennon Creer (RB, Louisiana Tech) & Nick Sukay (CB, Penn State)
- Attendance: 18,000 (est.)

United States TV coverage
- Network: NFL Network
- Announcers: Booth: Paul Burmeister, Mike Mayock, Charles Davis; Sideline: Rebecca Haarlow

The 2012 East–West Shrine Game was the 87th staging of the all-star college football exhibition game featuring NCAA Division I Football Bowl Subdivision players and a few select invitees from Canadian university football. The game featured over 100 players from the 2011 college football season, and prospects for the 2012 draft of the professional National Football League (NFL). In the week prior to the game, scouts from all 32 NFL teams attended. The proceeds from the East-West Shrine Game benefit Shriners Hospitals for Children. Brad Childress and Bobby Ross were named coaches on December 19, 2011.

This oldest all-star game was played on January 21, 2012, at 4 p.m. ET at the Tropicana Field. The radio broadcast team was Patrick Kinas and Brian Jordan in the radio booth, and Rick Berkey reporting from the sidelines. The Pat Tillman Award was presented to Tauren Poole (RB, Tennessee) as a player who "best exemplifies character, intelligence, sportsmanship and service".

== Players ==
=== East Team ===
- Name, Pos., College
- Justin Bethel, CB, Presbyterian
- Emanuel Davis, CB, East Carolina
- Gary Gray, CB, Notre Dame
- R.J. Blanton, CB, Notre Dame
- Charles Brown, CB, North Carolina
- Micah Pellerin, CB, Hampton
- Josh Norman, CB, Coastal Carolina
- Matt Conrath, DL, Virginia
- Julian Miller, DL, West Virginia
- Jabaree Tuani, DL, Navy
- Kyle Wilber, DL, Wake Forest
- Akiem Hicks, DL, Regina
- Nick Jean-Baptiste, DL, Baylor
- Micanor Regis, DL, Miami
- Travian Robertson, DL, South Carolina
- Bruce Figgins, FB/TE, Georgia
- Brandon Lindsey, LB, Pittsburgh
- Najee Goode, LB, West Virginia
- Shawn Loiseau, LB, Merrimack
- Steven Erzinger, LB, Army
- Max Gruder, LB, Pittsburgh
- Joshua Linam, LB, Central Florida
- Nick Sukay, LB, Penn State
- Quentin Saulsberry, OC, Mississippi State
- Tyler Horn, OC, Miami
- Derek Dennis, OG, Temple
- Jeremiah Warren, OG, South Florida
- Desmond Wynn, OG, Rutgers
- Rishaw Johnson, OG, California-Pennsylvania
- Jeff Adams, OT, Columbia
- Lamar Holmes, OT, Southern Miss
- Joe Long, OT, Wayne State
- Bradley Sowell, OT, Mississippi
- Blair Walsh, K, Georgia
- Shawn Powell, P, Florida State
- B. J. Coleman, QB, Tennessee-Chattanooga
- Austin Davis, QB, Southern Miss
- John Brantley, QB, Florida
- Alfred Morris, RB, Florida Atlantic
- Tauren Poole, RB, Tennessee
- Davin Meggett, RB, Maryland
- Matt Daniels, S, Duke
- Jerrell Young, S, South Florida
- Christian Thompson, S, South Carolina State
- Tysyn Hartman, S, Kansas State
- Chase Ford, TE, Miami
- Emil Igwenagu, TE, Massachusetts
- Evan Rodriguez, TE, Temple
- Tim Benford, WR, Tennessee Tech
- LaRon Byrd, WR, Miami
- B.J. Cunningham, WR, Michigan State
- Kevin Hardy, WR, The Citadel
- Lance Lewis, WR, East Carolina
- Thomas Mayo, WR, California-Pennsylvania
- A.J. Jenkins, WR, Illinois

=== West Team ===
- Name, Pos., College
- Chris Greenwood, CB, Albion
- Brandon Hardin, CB, Oregon State
- Rodney McLeod, CB, Virginia
- Shaun Prater, CB, Iowa
- Keith Tandy, CB, West Virginia
- Trevin Wade, CB, Arizona
- Tyrone Crawford, DL, Boise State
- Kentrell Lockett, DL, Mississippi
- Arnaud Nadon, DL, Laval
- Justin Francis, DL, Rutgers
- Dominique Hamilton, DL, Missouri
- Vaughn Meatoga, DL, Hawaii
- Kaniela Tuipulotu, DL, Hawaii
- DaJohn Harris, DL, Southern California
- Jerry Franklin, LB, Arkansas
- Tank Carder, LB, Texas Christian
- Steven Johnson, LB, Kansas
- Brandon Marshall, LB, Nevada
- Josh Kaddu, LB, Oregon
- Ronnie Thomton, LB, Southern Miss
- David Snow, OC, Texas
- Moe Petrus, OC, Connecticut
- Brandon Brooks, OG, Miami (OH)
- Markus Zusevics, OG, Iowa
- Ben Heenan, OG, Saskatchewan
- Josh LeRibeus, OG, Southern Methodist
- Tom Compton, OT, South Dakota
- Ryan Miller, OT, Colorado
- Al Netter, OT, Northwestern
- Matt Reynolds, OT, Brigham Young
- Marcel Jones, OT, Nebraska
- Greg Zuerlein, K, Missouri Western State
- Matt Prewitt, P, Kentucky Christian
- Bryan Anger, P, California
- Tyler Hansen, QB, Colorado
- Chandler Harnish, QB, Northern Illinois
- Dan Persa, QB, Northwestern
- Lennon Creer, RB, Louisiana Tech
- Marc Tyler, RB, Southern California
- Bobby Rainey, RB, Western Kentucky
- Aaron Henry, S, Wisconsin
- Austin Cassidy, S, Nebraska
- Blake Gideon, S, Texas
- Duke Ihenaho, S, San Jose State
- Kevin Koger, TE, Michigan
- Cory Harkey, TE, UCLA
- George Bryan, TE, North Carolina State
- David Paulson, TE, Oregon
- Greg Childs, WR, Arkansas
- Junior Hemingway, WR, Michigan
- Dale Moss, WR, South Dakota State
- Tyler Shoemaker, WR, Boise State
- Jarius Wright, WR, Arkansas
- Devon Wylie, WR, Fresno State
- Darius Hanks, WR, Alabama

== Game notes ==
- This was the third time the game was played in Florida; having been played the prior two years at the Florida Citrus Bowl in Orlando, this was the first time it was held in St. Petersburg.

=== Scoring summary ===
Scoring summary

Quarter	Time	Drive			Team	Scoring information	Score	
Quarter	Time	Plays	Yards	TOP	Team	Scoring information	East	West
1	9:44	9	70	5:16	East	28-yard field goal by Blair Walsh	3	0
1	3:51	5	94	2:55	East	B. J. Cunningham 17-yard touchdown reception from B. J. Coleman, Blair Walsh kick good	10	0
2	10:03	19	80	8:48	West	Chandler Harnish 1-yard touchdown run, Greg Zuerlein kick good	10	7
2	5:18	7	49	4:45	West	Tyler Hansen 3-yard touchdown run, Greg Zuerlein kick good	10	14
2	0:20	14	83	4:58	East	LaRon Byrd 3-yard touchdown reception from Austin Davis, Blair Walsh kick good	17	14
4	13:21	9	68	4:36	West	35-yard field goal by Greg Zuerlein	17	17
4	0:47	9	74	2:47	West	Lennon Creer 9-yard touchdown run, Greg Zuerlein kick good	17	24
"TOP" = time of possession. For other American football terms, see Glossary of American football.							17	24

=== Statistics ===
Statistics	East	West
First downs	18	25
Total offense, plays - yards	53-316	73-377
Rushes-yards (net)	22-57	39-171
Passing yards (net)	259	206
Passes, Comp-Att-Int	18-31-0	21-34-1
Time of Possession	24:27	35:33
