= Gene McGuire =

American football player (born 1970)

No. 60
- Position: Center

Personal information
- Born: July 17, 1970 (age 56); Fort Dix, New Jersey, U.S.
- Listed height: 6 ft 2 in (1.88 m)
- Listed weight: 300 lb (136 kg)

Career information
- High school: Lynn Haven (FL) Mosley
- College: Notre Dame
- NFL draft: 1992: 4th round, 95th overall pick

Career history
- New Orleans Saints (1992); Chicago Bears (1993); Arizona Cardinals (1994)*; Green Bay Packers (1995)*; Miami Dolphins (1995); Green Bay Packers (1996)
- * Offseason or practice squad member only

Awards and highlights
- Super Bowl champion (XXXI)

Career NFL statistics
- Games played: 17
- Stats at Pro Football Reference

Walter Eugene McGuire Jr. (born July 17, 1970) is an American former professional football player who was a center in the National Football League (NFL). He played college football for the Notre Dame Fighting Irish.

== Career ==
McGuire was selected in the fourth round by the New Orleans Saints in 1992 NFL draft and spent the 1992 NFL season with the team, but did not see any playing time. He spent the 1993 NFL season with the Chicago Bears before spending a year away from the NFL. During the 1995 NFL season he was a member of the Miami Dolphins, but once again did not see any playing time. McGuire spent his final season with the Green Bay Packers, culminating in the victory of Super Bowl XXXI.

He played at the collegiate level at the University of Notre Dame.
