= Khyri Thornton =

American gridiron football player (born 1989)

No. 67, 99
- Position: Defensive tackle

Personal information
- Born: November 21, 1989 (age 36); Panama City, Florida, U.S.
- Listed height: 6 ft 3 in (1.91 m)
- Listed weight: 315 lb (143 kg)

Career information
- High school: Bay (Panama City)
- College: Southern Miss
- NFL draft: 2014: 3rd round, 85th overall pick

Career history
- Green Bay Packers (2014); New England Patriots (2015); Detroit Lions (2015–2017); New York Giants (2017); St. Louis BattleHawks (2020); Toronto Argonauts (2021–2022)*
- * Offseason or practice squad member only

Awards and highlights
- Second-team All-C-USA (2013)

Career NFL statistics
- Total tackles: 27
- Sacks: 1.0
- Forced fumbles: 1
- Stats at Pro Football Reference

Khyri Jerome Thornton (born November 21, 1989) is an American former professional football player who was a defensive tackle in the National Football League (NFL). He played college football for the Southern Miss Golden Eagles, and was selected by the Green Bay Packers in the third round of the 2014 NFL draft. He was also a member of the New England Patriots, Detroit Lions, New York Giants, St. Louis BattleHawks and Toronto Argonauts.

== Early life ==
Thornton was born in Panama City, Florida and attended Bay High School there, where he made 49 tackles, including 46 solo stops, two sacks, three forced fumbles, and one fumble recovery as a senior. He also played fullback, recording 678 yards rushing with 10 touchdowns. He did not qualify academically for the NCAA standards, leading him to spend one year at Hargrave Military Academy in Chatham, Virginia.

He was considered a four-star recruit by Rivals.com. He was ranked 16th among prep school prospects, and the 20th best prospect at defensive tackle in 2008 by ESPN. He was named to the Orlando Sentinel Top 100 and played in the North-South Football All-Star Classic.

He worked construction while he was in high school.

== College career ==
Thornton was well recruited coming out of school and had received interest in a number of schools including Arkansas, Clemson, Florida State, and South Florida. After originally committing to South Florida, he had not been approved by USF's academic committee, despite meeting the NCAA standard. He enrolled instead at Southern Miss, and was given a redshirt designation in 2009.

Thornton started his career with the Golden Eagles by playing in all 13 games in 2010 and recording 17 tackles, five tackles for loss, and 2.5 sacks. He had his best game of the season against Prairie View A&M where he recorded three tackles. At the end of the season, he was selected to the Conference USA All-Freshman team as voted on by the league's head football coaches.

In 2011, he appeared in 14 games, starting seven at defensive tackle, and tallied 24 tackles, nine tackles for loss and 1.5 sacks with one pass batted, one forced fumble and one fumble recovery. During the 2011 Hawaii Bowl, Thornton had two tackles and one half-sack.

Thornton was Southern Miss's primary defensive tackle in 2012, playing in 12 games and starting 11 of them. During the game against Western Kentucky, He intercepted a pass and returned it 12 yards. He ended his junior campaign with 36 tackles, 23 of which were solo, 9.5 tackles for loss which was the second-best on the team. He also had one sack and a forced fumble.

In his final year with the Golden Eagles, Thornton started 11 games and was voted a team captain by the other players. He had his best game of the season against Florida International University, where he had a season-high seven tackles, 2.5 of those for a loss, and added on half a sack. In eight games he had at least three tackles, and five stops in four contests. Thornton missed the final contest of his collegiate career due to a deep bone bruise that caused some internal bleeding he sustained the week before against Middle Tennessee. He finished up the year with 39 tackles (16 solo), 6.5 tackles for loss and half a sack. For his efforts, he was named to the All-Conference USA second-team as a defensive lineman by the league's coaches. He was a finalist for the Conerly Trophy, which is given annually to the state's top collegiate player. Although he was beaten for the award by Gabe Jackson, an offensive guard from Mississippi State.

He finished his collegiate career with 50 games played, 28 starts, 116 tackles (58 solo), 30 tackles for a loss, 5.5 sacks, two forced fumbles (one recovered), an interception, and three defended passes.

== Professional career ==
=== Pre-draft ===
Thornton received an invitation and played in the NFLPA Collegiate Bowl, becoming only the second Southern Mississippi player to attend. During the game, he was noted up as "frequently taking up multiple blockers" and that he showed fast hands and an ability to pressure the quarterback. He recorded one sack in the game.

To prepare for the NFL Combine, Thornton reportedly worked out at the EXOS facility in Gulf Breeze, Florida at the recommendation of former teammate Jamie Collins. He entered the facility at six-foot-three inches tall and weighing 300 pounds. One of the trainers there said that he was so big he had to cut a slit in his shirt to get it over his head.

During an interview at the facility, Thornton said that scouts had told him he needed to work on keeping his pads low, but he was more focused on running a fast forty yard dash and his bench press.

Thornton was projected to be drafted in the late fifth or early sixth round by NFL Scouts. Scouts said that he had great strength and quick hands, and was very versatile on the defensive line with good bursts of speed. He was said to have short arms and small hands and could do a better job working off blocks and protecting his legs. Stamina was a concern, as was his lack of pass rush moves. He missed a lot of tackles and did not have that many sacks. Scouts were concerned that he did not face top talent at the collegiate level. One of scout's biggest concerns was how often he took plays off from the game. He offered a rebuttal about taking plays off saying that he still ran towards the ball and that he never gave up on a play, and that he always encouraged his teammates to do the same. Overall, he was projected to be a project player and a good fit in schemes used by the New York Jets, Baltimore Ravens, or Pittsburgh Steelers

Pre-draft measurables
Height	Weight	40-yard dash	10-yard split	20-yard split	20-yard shuttle	Three-cone drill	Vertical jump	Broad jump	Bench press	Wonderlic
6 ft 3 in (1.91 m)	304 lb (138 kg)	5.03 s	1.71 s	2.86 s	4.76 s	7.83 s	29 in (0.74 m)	9 ft 3 in (2.82 m)	28 reps	24
All results from NFL Combine

=== Green Bay Packers ===
Thornton was selected by the Green Bay Packers in the third round (85th overall) of the 2014 NFL draft. He was the fifth defensive lineman drafted by Packers' general manager Ted Thompson in three years. Mike Mayock commented that the Packers had drafted a player who "flies all over the field. He can play inside, but he moves along the line of scrimmage. There's an energy, there's a motor." Thornton admitted that he was surprised to hear his name as one of the Packers' two picks in the third round. Thompson has said that Khyri kept catching the Packers' eye even though he didn't play on a team that won a lot of games. It was predicted by the media that the Packers would move him from defensive tackle to defensive end or they would attempt to convert him to nose tackle. He was not projected to star in the scheme, but was expected to be part of the defensive rotation

Thornton signed his rookie contract on May 19, 2014. His former defensive coordinator at Southern Miss, Derrick LeBlanc commented that Green Bay was going to get a guy who would work hard every day and that he has the talents for a long career in the NFL.

During training camp, Thornton noted that he had played in five schemes in five years while in college and believed that that experience would allow him to fit in anywhere on the defensive line. He commented saying that he would play whatever position the coaching staff wanted him to play commenting "Wherever I can get in, to fit, to make us win, I'll play it. I enjoy playing. I'm gonna give my effort, 100 percent."

In his first preseason, he recorded six tackles in four preseason games and was considered "on the bubble" for a roster spot. Packers head coach Mike McCarthy said that Thornton was "Raw" and that "This is a whole different system for him. Everything's new. But, boy, he's got a lot of fast twitch in his body for a big man." He played more snaps then anyone on the defensive line with eighty during the preseason.

On August 30, 2014, Thornton was placed on injured reserve after sustaining a hamstring injury in the final preseason game against the Kansas City Chiefs.

On September 5, 2015, Thornton was waived by the Packers.

=== New England Patriots ===
The New England Patriots claimed Thornton off waivers on September 6, 2015. He was waived on September 17, 2015, but was re-signed on October 1, 2015. On October 22, 2015, Thornton was released by the Patriots.

=== Detroit Lions ===
On October 25, 2015, Thornton was claimed off waivers by the Detroit Lions.

During the 2016 season, Thornton played in 13 games for the Lions, starting 6 and recording 18 tackles and a sack. Thornton took over as a starting defensive tackle for the Lions midseason due to struggles from Tyrunn Walker, but eventually lost his starting job to rookie A'Shawn Robinson and became a rotational defensive tackle.

On March 7, 2017, Thornton signed a two-year contract extension with the Lions. On June 20, 2017, Thornton was suspended the first six games of the 2017 season for violating the league's policy on substances of abuse. He was reinstated from suspension on October 16, 2017. On November 21, 2017, Thornton was released by the Lions.

=== New York Giants ===
On November 29, 2017, Thornton signed with the New York Giants. He was released on December 12, 2017.

Thornton was suspended 10 weeks by the NFL on December 23, 2017, which was served over the final two weeks of the 2017 season and the first eight weeks of the 2018 season. He was reinstated from suspension on October 30, 2018.

=== St. Louis BattleHawks ===
In October 2019, Thornton was selected by the St. Louis BattleHawks of the XFL in the 2020 XFL draft. He was placed on injured reserve on December 18, 2019. He had his contract terminated when the league suspended operations on April 10, 2020.

=== Toronto Argonauts ===
Thornton signed with the Toronto Argonauts of the Canadian Football League on February 2, 2021. He was placed on the suspended list on July 20, 2021. He was released on February 14, 2023.

=== NFL career statistics ===
Source: Pro-Football-Reference.com

Year	Team	G	GS	Tackles					Interceptions						Fumbles	
Year	Team	G	GS	Total	Solo	Ast	Sck	SFTY	PDef	Int	Yds	Avg	Lng	TDs	FF	FR
Regular season
2015	DET	6	0	5	3	2	0.0	0	0	0	0	0.0	0	0	0	0
2016	DET	13	6	19	14	5	1.0	0	0	0	0	0.0	0	0	0	0
2017	DET	4	0	4	3	1	0.0	0	0	0	0	0.0	0	0	0	0
Total		23	6	28	20	8	1.0	0	0	0	0	0.0	0	0	0	0

== Personal life ==
Thornton's cousin attended high school with him and is now a wide receiver at Florida International University. While in college, he volunteered at Dubard High School in Hattiesburg, Mississippi where he worked with special needs children. He traveled and spoke to high-school and middle-school students while in college. He currently resides in Panama City Florida. He has said that his ultimate goal in the NFL is to make sure his mother "never has to work again."
