= Donnie Craft =

American football player (born 1959)

No. 40, 18
- Position: Running back

Personal information
- Born: November 19, 1959 (age 66); Panama City, Florida, U.S.
- Listed height: 6 ft 0 in (1.83 m)
- Listed weight: 206 lb (93 kg)

Career information
- High school: A. Crawford Mosley (Lynn Haven, Florida)
- College: Louisville (1978–1981)
- NFL draft: 1982: 12th round, 314th overall pick

Career history
- Houston Oilers (1982–1984); Hamilton Tiger-Cats (1984)

Career NFL statistics
- Rushing yards: 189
- Rushing average: 2.6
- Rushing touchdowns: 3
- Stats at Pro Football Reference

Donald Joseph Craft (born November 19, 1959) is an American former professional football player who was a running back for three seasons with the Houston Oilers of the National Football League (NFL). He was selected by the Oilers in the twelfth round of the 1982 NFL draft after playing college football for the Louisville Cardinals. Craft also played for the Hamilton Tiger-Cats of the Canadian Football League (CFL).

== Early life ==
Donald Joseph Craft was born on November 19, 1959, in Panama City, Florida. He attended A. Crawford Mosley High School in Lynn Haven, Florida.

== College career ==
Craft was a four-year letterman for the Cardinals of the University of Louisville from 1978 to 1981. As a freshman in 1978, he totaled 54 carries for 255 yards and one touchdown, two catches for five yards, and two completions on two passing attempts for 37 yards and two touchdowns. In 1979, he recorded 86 rushing attempts for 347 yards and two touchdowns, six receptions for 79 yards, and two incomplete passes. Craft rushed 140 times for 687 yards and five touchdowns in 1980 while catching six passes for 74 yards and throwing two incomplete passes. As a senior in 1981, he accumulated 136 carries for 475 yards and five touchdowns, and 25 receptions for 207 yards and two touchdowns.

== Professional career ==
Craft was selected by the Houston Oilers in the 12th round, with the 314th overall pick, of the 1982 NFL draft. He played in nine games, starting two, for the Oilers in 1982, rushing 18 times for 42 yards and three touchdowns while catching 23 passes for 230 yards and one touchdown. He appeared in 15 games, starting two, in 1983, recording 55 carries for 147 yards and 12 catches for 99 yards. Craft was waived on August 28, 1984, but reclaimed off waivers shortly thereafter. He played in one game during the 1984 season but did not record any statistics and was waived in September 1984.

On September 19, 1984, it was reported that Craft had been signed to a 21-day trial with the Hamilton Tiger-Cats of the Canadian Football League (CFL). He signed a contract with the team on September 28. He played in two games for the Tiger-Cats in 1984, rushing ten times for 27 yards, catching eight passes for 56 yards, and returning one kick for 37 yards. Craft was released on October 17, 1984, after Johnny Shepherd returned from injury.
