= David Hart (actor) =

American actor and singer

- Born: February 6, 1954 (age 71); Marianna, Florida, United States
- Occupation(s): Actor, singer
- Spouse: Anne Tabor
- Children: 3 (including Mamrie)

David Hart (born February 6, 1954) is an American actor and singer best known for his portrayal of Sgt. Parker Williams on the television series In the Heat of the Night (1988 to 1995).

He has appeared in numerous films. Hart continues to perform in theaters around the country, most recently performing as Charlemagne in Pippin and Oscar in The Odd Couple.

He has also appeared in numerous commercials, including IHOP Restaurants, Maxwell House Coffee, Coors Light, John Deere, Pillsbury and GE.

== Early life ==
Hart was raised primarily by his mother, Jeanette Lassiter Anderson, in Panama City, Florida. He attended local schools. His father, Lloyd Hart Jr., encouraged him to attend Chipola Junior College (now Chipola College) after seeing him perform in You're a Good Man, Charlie Brown, produced at Rutherford High School in Panama City. Hart was given an acting scholarship to go to the college in Marianna, Florida.

== Personal life and family ==
Hart is married to Anne Tabor. Hart has three children from a previous marriage, one of whom is author, actress, comedian, and YouTuber Mamrie Hart.

== Musical career ==
Hart recorded the song "Let It Snow" for the 1991 In the Heat of the Night Christmas CD Christmas Time's A Comin'. He was joined on the recording by A-Team Nashville studio pianist Hargus "Pig" Robbins. The song was produced by co-stars Randall Franks and Alan Autry.

== Filmography ==
=== Television ===
- The Practice – "Black Widows" (2000) as Detective Cranston
- Party of Five – "Tender Age" (1998) as Carlin
- Before Women Had Wings – (1997) as the sheriff
- Picket Fences – "To Forgive is Divine" (1996) as Dan Patterson
- A Father for Charlie – (1995) as Woodrow
- In the Heat of the Night (1988-1995) as Officer and Sergeant Parker Williams
- Aaron's Way – "Patches of Light" (1988) as Travis

=== Films ===
- Forgiven: The Legend of Jake Kincaid (2002) as Sheriff Bob Logan
- Before Women Had Wings (1999) as Sheriff
- Standoff (1998) as Agent Blond
- Land of the Free (1997) as Byrd
- To the Limit (1995) as Bodyguard
- A Father for Charlie (1995) as Woodrow
- Three Wishes (1995) as Brian's Father
- The Real McCoy (1993) as Business Man
- In the Line of Duty (1991)
- Disorganized Crime (1989) as Proprietor
- The House on Carroll Street (1988) as Stage Manager
- War Party (1988) as Rookie Cop
- Pat Hobby Teamed with Genius (1987)
- Legal Eagles (1986) as Marchek
- Silver Bullet (1985) as Pete Sylvester
- Fandango (1985) as Cecil
- The River (1984) as Harley
- The Island (1980) as Attendant
