= Jason Whitaker =

American football player (born 1977)

No. 68
- Position: Offensive guard

Personal information
- Born: June 19, 1977 (age 49)
- Listed height: 6 ft 5 in (1.96 m)
- Listed weight: 300 lb (136 kg)

Career information
- High school: A. Crawford Mosley (Lynn Haven, Florida)
- College: Florida State

Career history
- 1995–1999: Florida State

Awards and highlights
- BCS national champion (1999); Consensus All-American (1999); 2× First-team All-ACC (1998, 1999); Second-team All-ACC (1997)

Jason Whitaker (born June 19, 1977) is an American former college football offensive guard who played for the Florida State Seminoles. He was a consensus All-American in 1999.

== Early life ==
Whitaker played high school football at A. Crawford Mosley High School in Lynn Haven, Florida. He was a second-team All-South selection and rated as the fourth best offensive tackle in Florida by The Florida Times-Union.

== College career ==
Whitaker played college football for the Florida State Seminoles of Florida State University. He was redshirted in 1995. He was a second-team All-Atlantic Coast Conference selection in 1997. He was named an All-American by the Football Writers Association of America in 1998 and was a third-team Associated Press All-American. Whitaker was also named first-team All-ACC and selected as a member of the All-ACC Academic team in 1998. He was a first-team consensus All-American and a first-team All-ACC selection in 1999.
