= Bay District Schools =

School district in Florida, United States

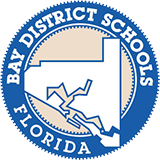

Address
- 1311 Balboa Avenue Panama City, Florida, 32401; United States

District information
- Type: Public
- Grades: Pre K-12
- Superintendent: Mark McQueen

Other information
- Website: www.bay.k12.fl.us

Bay District Schools (BDS) is a school district headquartered in Panama City, Florida, United States with 48 schools, 26,199 students, and 1,700 teachers, ranking it number 16 in the state for size. The district serves all of Bay County except for Mexico Beach, which is served by Gulf County Schools. Florida Governor Ron DeSantis appointed former Panama City, Florida City Manager Mark McQueen, a retired U.S. Army Major General to the position in August 2023 after the previous superintendent Bill Husfelt retired early in his term after being elected to the board in 2008.

During the 2021–2022 school year, BDS students had a graduation rate of 85.3. In the 2022–2023 school year, they scored 88.7, higher than the state average of 88. BDS leaders credit the improvement to the Graduation Pathways program that began in 2015. The program paired graduation coaches one-on-one with struggling students. In 2022, BDS was ranked 35th of the 67 counties in Florida, but moved up to 30th a year later. The district has earned a grade of "B" the last seven years. In July 2023, a memorandum of understanding (MOU) between BDS and the Association of Bay County Educators went into effect for one year. The MOU allowed highly qualified teachers to make extra money by transferring to low-rated schools in the district. Teachers who participated in the MOU received a $10,000 raise for transferring to Tier1 comprehensive support and improvement (CS&I) schools and $15,000 raises for transferring to Tier 2 CS&I schools. The minimum starting salary for teachers in Bay County, Florida in 2023 was $47,544.

== School uniforms ==
Students at all schools except for students at Margaret K. Lewis School, Shaw Adult Center, Rutherford High School, and Tom P. Haney Technical Center are required to wear school uniforms. Dress code varies between schools.

== Schools ==
=== High Schools ===
- A. Crawford Mosley High School
- Bay High School
- Deane Bozeman School
- J.R. Arnold High School
- Rosenwald High School (6–12)
- Rutherford High School (6–12)

=== Middle Schools ===
- Breakfast Point Academy (K-8)
- Deane Bozeman School (K-12)
- Jinks Middle School
- Merritt Brown Middle School
- Mowat Middle School
- Rosenwald High School (6–12)
- Rutherford High School (6–12)
- Surfside Middle School
- Tyndall Academy (K-8)

=== Elementary schools ===
- A. Gary Walsingham Academy
- Breakfast Point Academy (K-8)
- Callaway Elementary School
- Cedar Grove Elementary School
- Deane Bozeman School (K-12)
- Deer Point Elementary School
- Hiland Park Elementary School
- Hutchison Beach Elementary School
- Lucille Moore Elementary School
- Lynn Haven Elementary School
- M. Cherry Street Elementary School
- Northside Elementary School
- Parker Elementary School
- Patronis Elementary School
- Patterson Elementary School
- Southport Elementary School
- Tommy Smith Elementary School
- Tyndall Elementary School
- Waller Elementary School
- West Bay Elementary School

=== Charter Schools ===
- Bay Haven Charter Academy (K-8)
- Central High School
- Chautauqua Learn & Serve Charter School
- Maritime Academy
- North Bay Haven Charter Academy (K-12)
- Palm Bay Elementary School
- Palm Bay Preparatory Academy
- Rising Leaders Academy
- University Academy

=== Special Purpose Schools ===
- Margaret K. Lewis School
- New Horizons Learning Center
- St. Andrew School

=== Former Schools ===
- A.D. Harris High School
- Everitt Middle School
- Springfield Elementary School
- Millville Elementary School
- Shaw Adult Center
- C.C. Washington Academy

== See also ==
- 2010 Panama City school board shootings
