= Will Witherspoon =

American football player (born 1980)

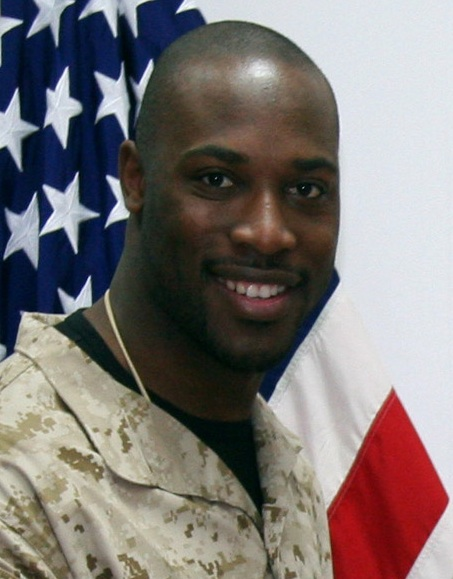
- Witherspoon at Al Asad Airbase in 2009

No. 54, 51, 50, 92
- Position: Linebacker

Personal information
- Born: August 19, 1980 (age 46); San Antonio, Texas, U.S.
- Listed height: 6 ft 1 in (1.85 m)
- Listed weight: 240 lb (109 kg)

Career information
- High school: Rutherford (Panama City, Florida)
- College: Georgia (1998–2001)
- NFL draft: 2002: 3rd round, 73rd overall pick

Career history
- Carolina Panthers (2002–2005); St. Louis Rams (2006–2009); Philadelphia Eagles (2009); Tennessee Titans (2010–2012); St. Louis Rams (2013)

Career NFL statistics
- Total tackles: 951
- Sacks: 26
- Forced fumbles: 11
- Fumble recoveries: 8
- Interceptions: 14
- Defensive touchdowns: 3
- Stats at Pro Football Reference

William Cordell Witherspoon (born August 19, 1980) is an American former professional football player who was a linebacker in the National Football League (NFL). He was selected by the Carolina Panthers in the third round of the 2002 NFL draft. He played college football for the Georgia Bulldogs. He also played for the St. Louis Rams, Philadelphia Eagles, and Tennessee Titans.

== Early life ==
Witherspoon's father served in the US Air Force, and so Witherspoon moved around as a child. However, his family never lived on the military bases, instead deciding to live in the community so the children could experience the culture. In addition to speaking English, he knows how to speak German, and is learning both Arabic and Swedish. He attended Good Shepherd Lutheran School in middle school. He played running back for Rutherford High School in Panama City, Florida, but switched to linebacker before his senior year. He was chosen as the USA Today Florida Player of the Year for his efforts as a senior, where he posted 112 tackles, 3 sacks, and three interceptions.

Witherspoon and his ex-wife, Rebecca, have three daughters.

== College career ==
He played college football at the University of Georgia, where he was a starter for three years. After playing every game as a true freshman, he started most of the Bulldogs' games for the remainder of his time at Georgia, switching between the middle, strong-side, and weak-side linebacker positions. He graduated with 211 tackles, 3.5 sacks, one forced fumble, and one fumble recovery. He was a landscape architecture major.

== Professional career ==
Pre-draft measurables
Height	Weight	Arm length	Hand span	40-yard dash	10-yard split	20-yard split	20-yard shuttle	Three-cone drill	Vertical jump	Broad jump	Bench press
6 ft 1 1/2 in (1.87 m)	231 lb (105 kg)	32 in (0.81 m)	9 in (0.23 m)	4.67 s	1.67 s	2.75 s	4.21 s	7.09 s	38 in (0.97 m)	10 ft 2 in (3.10 m)	25 reps
All values from NFL Combine

=== Carolina Panthers ===
Witherspoon was selected by the Carolina Panthers in the third round (73rd overall) of the 2002 NFL draft. He was the latest addition to new coach John Fox's overhaul of the defense, and Witherspoon's versatility at linebacker helped the Panthers total the second-best defense in the league. He replaced Dan Morgan at middle linebacker halfway through the season after Morgan went down with injury. He finished the season with 71 tackles and 1.5 sacks, his first half sack coming at the Cleveland Browns on December 1. During the 2003 NFL season, Witherspoon was the only Panther linebacker to start every game, where he once again filled in for an injured Morgan at middle linebacker.

He intercepted his first pass off New Orleans Saints quarterback Aaron Brooks. During Super Bowl XXXVIII, Witherspoon posted a career-high 16 tackles. He ended the campaign with a total of 99 tackles, one sack and one interception. The following year, "Spoon" was one of the few defensive players to start every game for the Panthers, who were wracked with injuries. Despite the loss of key personnel like defensive tackle Kris Jenkins, the Panthers led the league in interceptions. Witherspoon set personal bests with three sacks and four interceptions and a then career-high of 103 tackles. In 2005, his final year with the Panthers, Witherspoon played in 15 games and finished the season 81 tackles, 2.5 sacks and two interceptions.

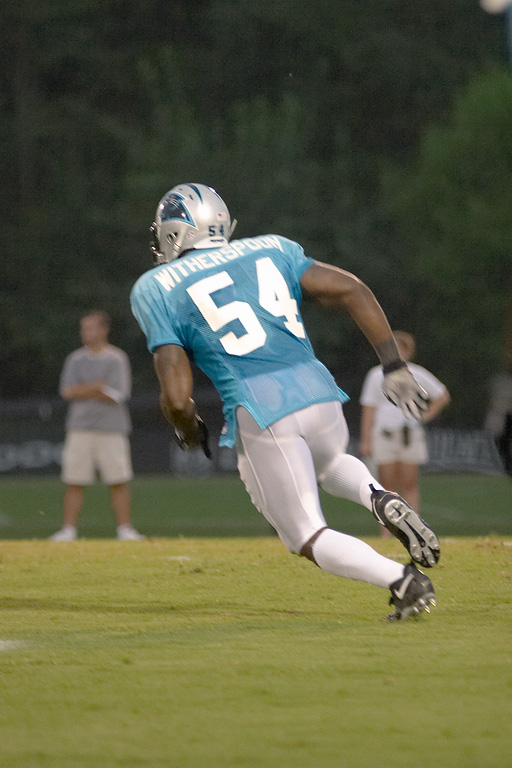
Witherspoon at the Panthers training camp in 2005.

=== St. Louis Rams (first stint) ===
On March 12, 2006, as an unrestricted free agent, he signed a six-year, $33 million contract (including $15 million guaranteed) with the St. Louis Rams In his first season (2006) with the Rams, he played in all 16 games and recorded a career-high 113 tackles and three sacks. In 2007, he recorded 110 tackles and a career-high seven sacks and was named Team MVP for 2007.

=== Philadelphia Eagles ===
On October 20, 2009, Witherspoon was traded from the Rams to the Philadelphia Eagles in exchange for wide receiver Brandon Gibson and a fifth round draft pick in 2010. In his first game as an Eagle against the Washington Redskins on October 26, 2009, he recorded six tackles, an interception (returned for a touchdown), sack, and a forced fumble. During the season, he played in 17 games, becoming the fifth player since bye weeks were reintroduced in 1990 to do so, as he was traded prior to St. Louis's bye week to the Eagles after the Eagles bye week.

He was released on March 5, 2010.

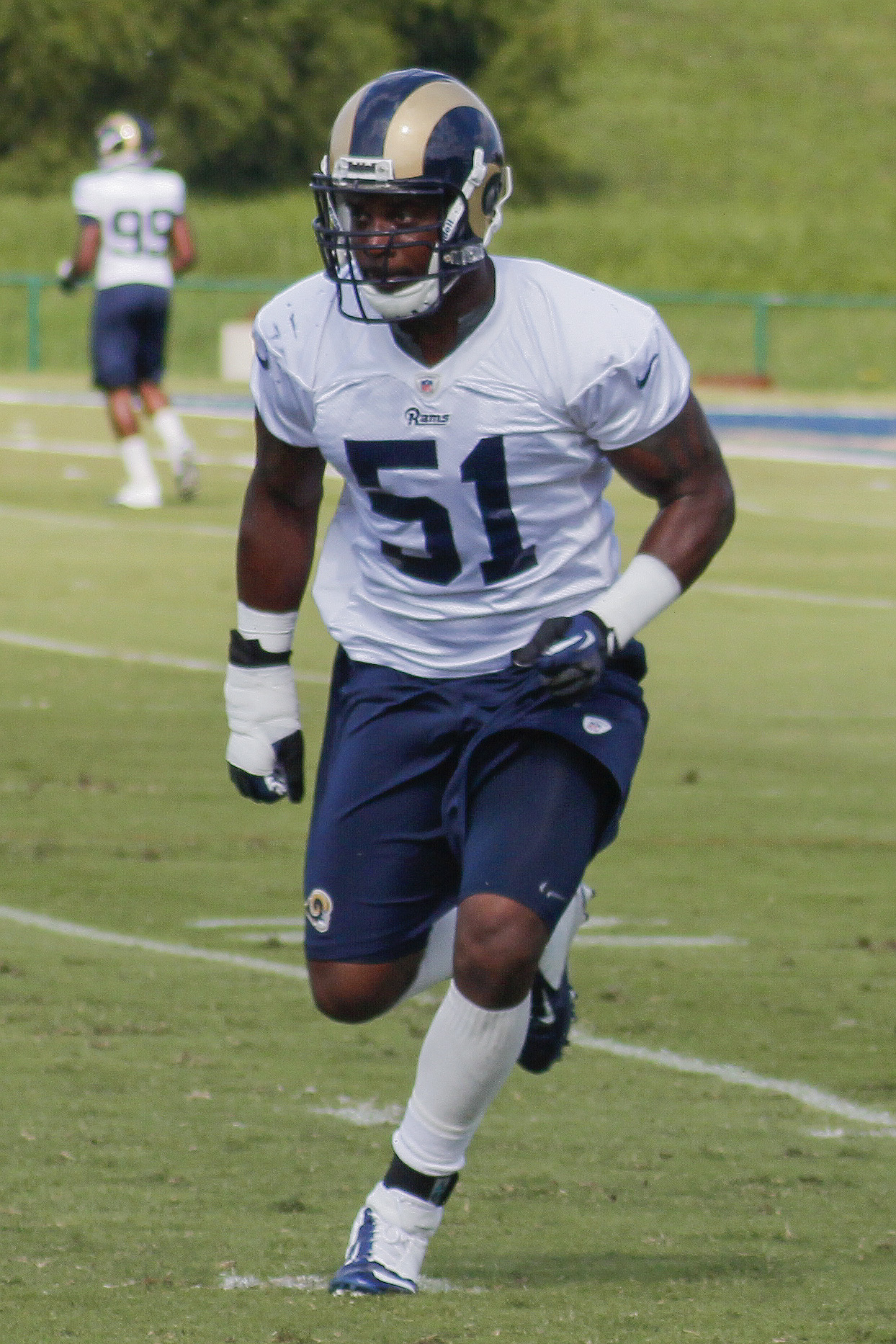
Witherspoon during second stint with Rams. 2013

=== Tennessee Titans ===
Witherspoon was signed by the Tennessee Titans on March 9, 2010. He was voted by his teammates as the Titans Ed Block Courage Award recipient

=== St. Louis Rams (second stint) ===
On July 18, 2013, Witherspoon signed with the Rams.

== NFL career statistics ==
Legend
**Bold**	Career high

=== Regular season ===
Year	Team	Games		Tackles					Interceptions					Fumbles			
Year	Team	GP	GS	Cmb	Solo	Ast	Sck	TFL	Int	Yds	TD	Lng	PD	FF	FR	Yds	TD
2002	CAR	15	8	71	56	15	1.5	3	0	0	0	0	5	1	1	0	0
2003	CAR	**16**	**16**	99	74	25	1.0	8	1	10	0	10	5	0	0	0	0
2004	CAR	**16**	**16**	103	84	19	3.0	5	**4**	**48**	0	25	**14**	1	1	0	0
2005	CAR	15	15	81	66	15	2.5	5	2	35	**1**	35	**14**	0	0	0	0
2006	STL	**16**	**16**	**116**	**102**	14	3.0	8	0	0	0	0	9	**3**	1	0	0
2007	STL	**16**	**16**	110	92	18	**7.0**	**14**	0	0	0	0	7	2	1	0	0
2008	STL	**16**	12	72	57	15	1.0	3	1	2	0	2	3	0	1	0	0
2009	STL	6	6	32	28	4	0.0	2	0	0	0	0	0	0	0	0	0
2009	PHI	11	10	58	51	7	1.0	3	1	9	**1**	9	5	1	0	0	0
2010	TEN	**16**	**16**	92	63	**29**	3.0	6	2	11	0	9	8	1	0	0	0
2011	TEN	**16**	14	56	41	15	2.0	5	1	7	0	7	3	1	**2**	**2**	0
2012	TEN	14	5	48	29	19	1.0	1	1	40	**1**	**40**	2	1	0	0	0
2013	STL	**16**	3	13	12	1	0.0	1	1	20	0	20	1	0	1	0	0
		189	153	951	755	196	26.0	64	14	182	3	40	76	11	8	2	0

=== Playoffs ===
Year	Team	Games		Tackles					Interceptions					Fumbles			
Year	Team	GP	GS	Cmb	Solo	Ast	Sck	TFL	Int	Yds	TD	Lng	PD	FF	FR	Yds	TD
2003	CAR	**4**	**4**	**27**	**18**	**9**	**1.0**	**3**	0	0	0	0	**1**	**1**	0	0	0
2005	CAR	3	3	20	16	4	**1.0**	**3**	0	0	0	0	**1**	**1**	0	0	0
2009	PHI	1	1	8	7	1	0.0	1	0	0	0	0	**1**	0	0	0	0
		8	8	55	41	14	2.0	7	0	0	0	0	3	2	0	0	0

== After football ==
After not being signed by any NFL team during the 2013-2014 off-season, Witherspoon announced his retirement from professional football. He then took a job as the St. Louis Rams sideline reporter for Rams Radio Network.

== Personal life ==
Witherspoon owns the sustainable Shire Gate Farm near Owensville, MO. Witherspoon has multiple children, including 3 children with ex-wife, Rebecca, and 2 children with ex-girlfriend, Tori Darling.
