= Rosenwald High School (Panama City, Florida) =

Location
- 924 Bay Avenue, Panama City, Florida, U.S. 30°9′58″N 85°38′27″W

Information
- Former name: Panama City High School
- School type: Public Alternative High School
- School district: Bay County School District
- NCES District ID: 1200090
- NCES School ID: 120009007763
- Principal: Jonathan McQuagge
- Grades: 6-12
- Enrollment: 249 (2021–2022)
- Colors: Maroon, Black & White
- Mascot: Bulldogs

Rosenwald High School (originally Panama City High School) is a public alternative secondary school in Panama City, Florida. It inherits the name of the Rosenwald School, a type of school founded for African American students established with support from Julius Rosenwald. The former school building is a historic landmark.

== About ==
Rosenwald High School, located in Panama City, Florida, currently caters to a diverse student body, specializing in serving students with various special needs. Renowned as a vital educational resource, Rosenwald offers a distinctive credit recovery program designed to assist students who may have encountered academic or behavioral challenges in traditional high school settings.

In addition to its academic support initiatives, Rosenwald High School pioneers innovative programs to meet the unique needs of its student population. Notably, the school houses a childcare academy program tailored for young mothers, enabling them to attend classes while their newborns receive care onsite.

Following the closure of the adjacent CC Washington Academy due to the impact of Hurricane Michael in 2018, Rosenwald expanded its educational reach to accommodate students in grades 6 through 12.

== History ==
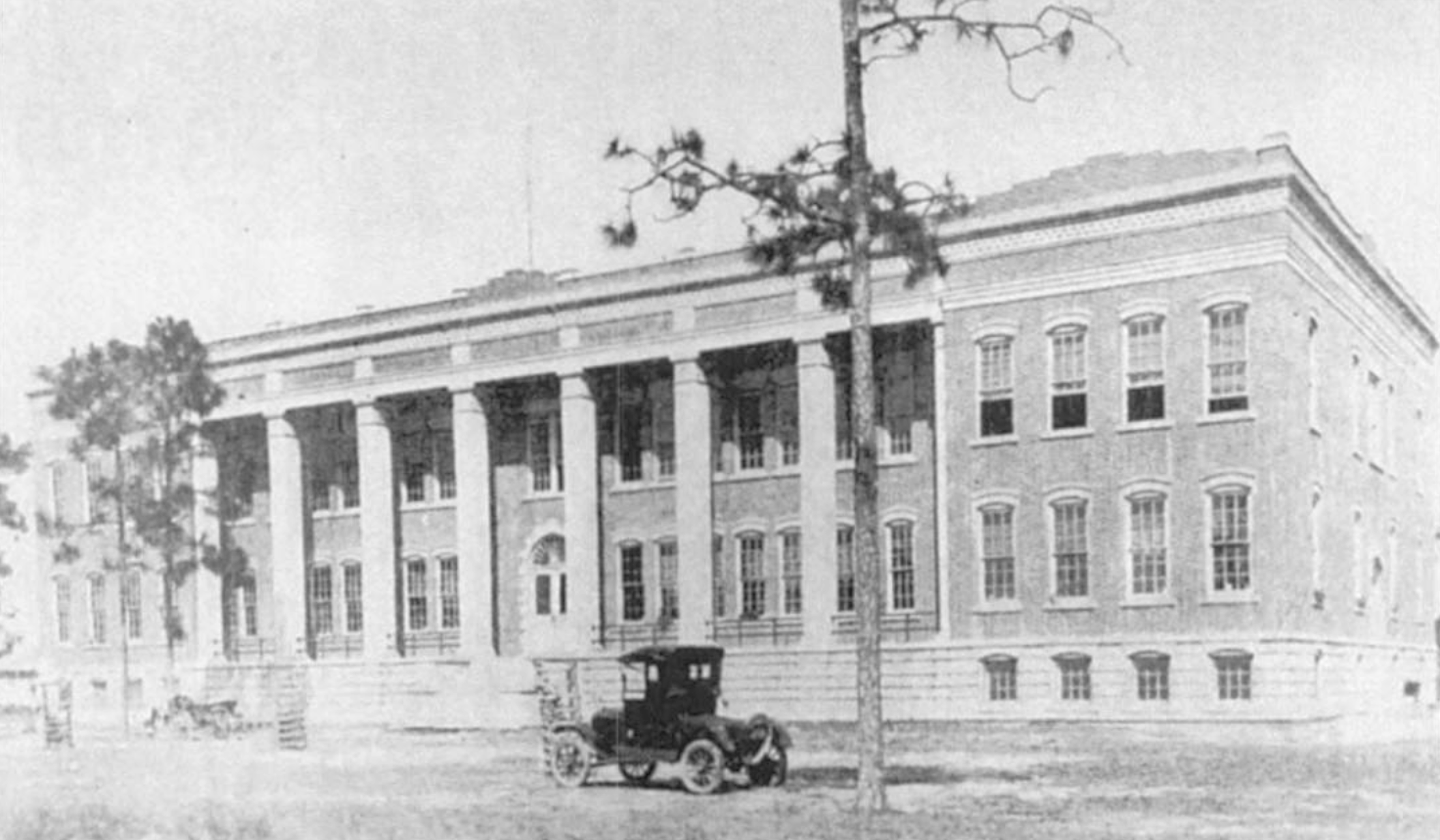
Panama City High School (1914)

From 1911 to 1914, the Panama City High School building was built from red bricks, and opened at the corner of Harrison Avenue and Seventh Street in Panama City. The first teacher was Annie McDonald, who taught all four high school grade levels. The first school graduation was in 1918, with a class of three.

The Panama City High School building was later used for the school for First Presbyterian Church. It was located at 819 East 11th Street, Panama City.

From 1937 to 1944, Richard V. Moore served as principal of the school, he later went on to become the third president of Bethune–Cookman College (now Bethune–Cookman University) in Daytona Beach.

Rosenwald was a middle school serving grades 6 through 8 from 1967 to 2009, and then became an alternative high school serving grades 9 through 12. Rosenwald and its alumni continue to be a vital part of the community.

Prior to desegregation, it was one of the only African American schools in the city. In October 2018, Hurricane Michael caused severe damage to the old school building structure. The original building is extant, and was purchased in 2021 with the intention of forming new housing.

== See also ==
- Rosenwald Junior College, also in Panama City
