= A Father for Charlie =

1995 television film by Jeff Bleckner

- Genre: Drama
- Written by: H. Haden Yelin
- Directed by: Jeff Bleckner
- Starring: Louis Gossett Jr.; Joseph Mazzello; James Greene; Don Swayze; David Hart; William Lucking
- Music by: David Shire
- Country of origin: United States
- Original language: English

Production
- Executive producers: Katie Jacobs; Pierce Gardner; Louis Gossett Jr.; Hillard Elkins; Dennis Considine
- Producer: Patricia Finnegan
- Cinematography: Alan Caso
- Editor: Alan Shefland
- Production companies: Jacobs/Gardner Productions; LoGo Entertainment; Finnegan Pinchuk

Original release
- Network: CBS
- Release: January 1, 1995

A Father for Charlie (alternate title: High Lonesome), is a television film that premiered on CBS on January 1, 1995. The film was directed by Jeff Bleckner and written by H. Haden Yelin. It stars Louis Gossett Jr. as Walter Osgood, the only black farmer in the highly-prejudiced town of High Lonesome in the Ozarks, at the height of the Great Depression in 1932. Despite the racist abuse he endures from the townspeople and the Ku Klux Klan, Walter forms an unlikely friendship with Charlie, the 10-year-old son of his white tenant farmer.

== Cast ==
- Louis Gossett Jr. as Walter Osgood
- Joseph Mazzello as Charlie
- James Greene as Sam
- Don Swayze as Reuben Cantwell
- David Hart as Woodrow
- William Lucking as Argus
- Jack Kehler
- Mark Cabus
- Patrick Labyorteaux as the Postmaster
- William Fichtner as the Sheriff
- Evan Rachel Wood as Tessa

== Production ==
A Father for Charlie was filmed in Southern California.

== Critical reception ==
Marion Garmel of The Indianapolis Star gave the film a favorable review, writing that it has "a wonderful spunkiness that makes you cheer for the human spirit." Also giving the film a positive review in the Los Angeles Times, Ray Loynd praised Yelin's writing for "turn[ing] material that appears to be dangerously fraught with sentiment and giv[ing] it thrust and life." Variety's Alan Rich found the film highly unoriginal, but noted that "[t]he very predictability lends the viewers a comforting caress." John Voorhees of The Seattle Times praised Gossett Jr.'s performance which he felt made the film worth watching. Chicago Tribune's Sid Smith thought the portrayal of racism was "heavy-handed," but found the film "ultimately irresistible."

== Ratings ==
A Father for Charlie earned a 14.8 national Nielsen rating, equalling 14.1 million households, making it the eighth highest-rated prime time program for the week of December 26, 1994 to January 1, 1995. In terms of total viewers, the film was the sixth most-watched prime time program with an audience of 22.9 million.
