= Tauren Poole =

American football player (born 1989)

No. 27
- Position: Running back

Personal information
- Born: October 19, 1989 (age 37); Toccoa, Georgia, U.S.
- Listed height: 5 ft 10 in (1.78 m)
- Listed weight: 215 lb (98 kg)

Career information
- High school: Stephens County (Toccoa)
- College: Tennessee
- NFL draft: 2012: undrafted

Career history
- Carolina Panthers (2012–2013); Indianapolis Colts (2013)*; Pittsburgh Steelers (2014)*; Carolina Panthers (2014); New Orleans Saints (2014)*; Carolina Panthers (2014)*; Baltimore Ravens (2014)*
- * Offseason or practice squad member only
- Stats at Pro Football Reference

Tauren Chasmaine Poole (born October 19, 1989) is an American former professional football player who was a running back in the National Football League (NFL). He played college football for the Tennessee Volunteers.

== College career ==
Poole attended University of Tennessee from 2008 to 2011 under head coaches Phillip Fulmer, Lane Kiffin, and Derek Dooley. The 2010 season was Poole's breakout with the Volunteers. He had six games going over 100 rushing yards on the season: UT Martin, Oregon, LSU, Alabama, Memphis, and Ole Miss. In addition, he had 11 rushing touchdowns. During his career, he rushed for 1,898 yards on 423 carries and 17 touchdowns. He was awarded the Pat Tillman Award at the 2012 East–West Shrine Game.

== Professional career ==
=== Carolina Panthers ===
Poole was signed as an undrafted free agent by the Carolina Panthers. He later spent time with the Pittsburgh Steelers and Indianapolis Colts. He signed again to the Panthers' active roster on September 27, 2014. On September 28, he made his NFL debut against the Baltimore Ravens. However, on his first career carry, he fumbled. He was released by the Panthers the next day, but re-signed with their practice squad soon after.

=== New Orleans Saints ===
The New Orleans Saints signed Poole to their practice squad on November 4, 2014. On November 20, he was released by the team.

== Personal life ==
Poole's cousin is current Tennessee running back, Javin Gordon.
