= Smith & Wesson Model 469 =

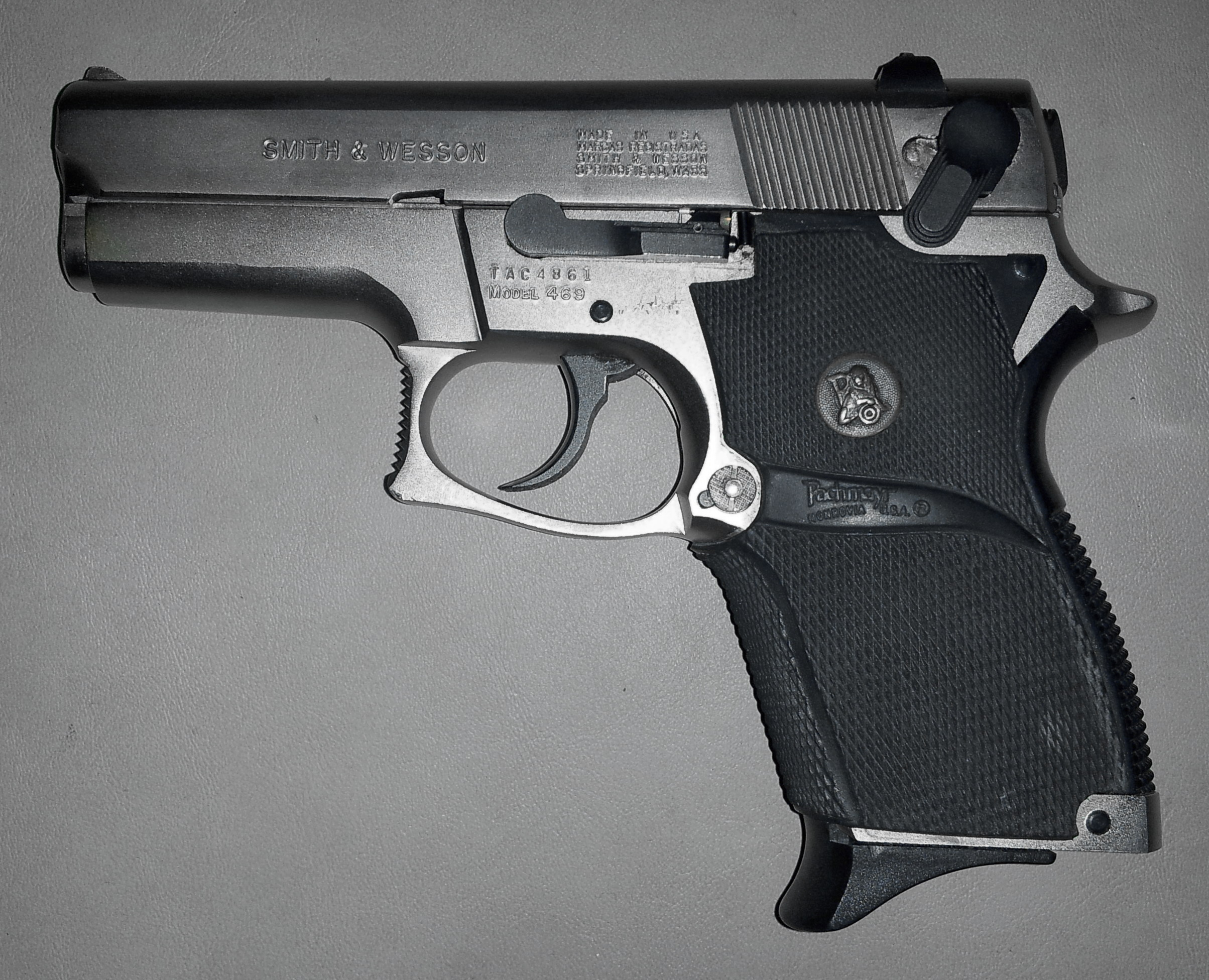
- Type: Semi-automatic pistol
- Place of origin: United States

Service history
- Used by: United States

Production history
- Manufacturer: Smith & Wesson

Specifications
- Mass: 26 oz (740 g)
- Barrel length: 3.5 in (89 mm)
- Cartridge: 9×19mm
- Action: DA/SA
- Rate of fire: Semi-automatic
- Feed system: 12-round double column, detachable box magazine
- Sights: Fixed Iron sights, optional adjustable

The Smith & Wesson Model 469 is a semi-automatic pistol, chambered for the 9mm cartridge.

== History and design ==
The Model 469 is an early model in Smith & Wesson's 59-series, envisioned as pistols that could be easily concealed, but with sufficient firepower to work as service weapons as well. It is a traditional DA/SA pistol with a 3.5-inch barrel, equipped with a slide-mounted safety/decocker. Magazine capacity is 12 rounds.

When Smith & Wesson introduced its "third-generation" series of semiautomatics, several similar pistols succeeded the Model 469. These included the Model 6904, which had an alloy frame with black finish, the Model 6906, which was the same pistol in a stainless steel finish, both operating in double-action/single-action mode. The Model 6946 was similar to the 6906 but operated in double-action-only mode.

Although the 69-series of pistol is no longer produced, the polymer-framed Smith & Wesson M&P compact possesses similar dimensions, and the same barrel length and magazine capacity (in 9mm).
