= Tasha K =

American comedian and social media personality (born 1982)

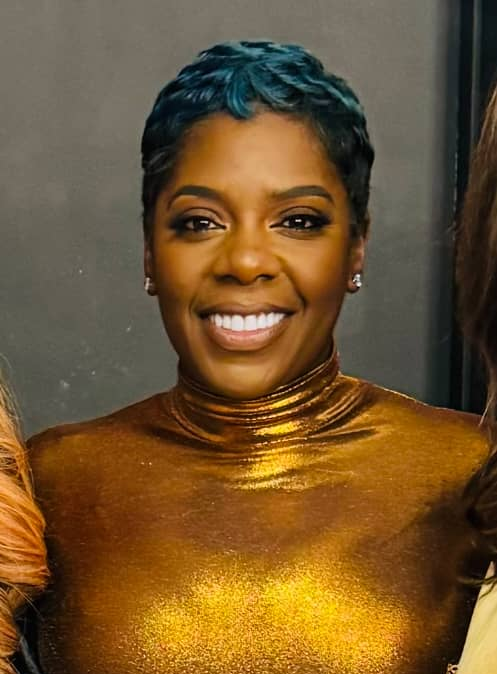
- Tasha K in 2023
- Born: Latasha Transrina Howard; March 10, 1982 (age 44); Panama City, Florida, U.S.
- Occupations: Comedian; online personality; producer
- Years active: 2010–present
- Spouse: Cheickna Hamala Kebe
- Children: 2

YouTube information
- Channel: UNWINEWITHTASHAK
- Genres: News; Comedy
- Subscribers: 1.36 million
- Views: 343 million
- Last updated: March 19, 2026

Latasha Transrina Kebe (née Howard; born March 10, 1982), known professionally as Tasha K, is an American comedian, celebrity news broadcaster, gossip blogger and online personality. She has been featured on The Shade Room, TMZ, Billboard, Daily Mail, Essence, New York Post, Radar Online, Page Six, E! News, Rolling Stone, The Nick Cannon Show, Vibe, Complex and HuffPost.

She gained notoriety after publishing defamatory claims about American rapper Cardi B, which she was found guilty and ordered to pay over $4M to the rapper.

== Career ==
Tasha K is known for her YouTube channel UNWINEWITHTASHAK, which focuses on entertainment and celebrity news and scandals with a blend of comedy and wine tasting. She also features similar content on her website, TashaK Live, which is available through paid subscription.

As a comedian, she hosts the Come Tea comedy show.

== Legal issues ==
In March 2019, Tasha K was sued by rapper Cardi B for defamation, with the lawsuit filed in the United States District Court for the Northern District of Georgia. In January 2022, she was found liable by the jury and directed to pay $4 million in damages. Subsequently, in May 2023, Tasha K filed for bankruptcy. In October 2023, the judge ruled that Tasha K pay Cardi B damages regardless of the bankruptcy claim. She later apologized to Cardi B. In April 2024, Cardi B alleged that Tasha K kept offshore accounts. In February 2025, Tasha K was ordered to pay $1.2 million to Cardi B over five years, after which time, Cardi B can pursue the remainder of her settlement.

In November 2023, singer and rapper R. Kelly sued the Federal Bureau of Prisons (BOP) and Tasha K, alleging that members of the BOP sold his digital prison records, including his phone calls to Tasha K, starting in 2019. Kelly's lawyers alleged negligence, invasion of privacy, intentional infliction of emotional distress, civil theft, civil conspiracy, and violation of the computer fraud and Abuse Act. The Department of Justice's investigation found that at least 60 officers accessed his records, with one officer allegedly providing them to Tasha K. Kelly claims the leaks included recordings of his phone calls with his legal team and girlfriend, which left him isolated and fearful to communicate with his attorneys.

In December 2023, Kevin Hart filed a lawsuit against Tasha K for defamation and extortion, relating to Tasha K's publication of an interview with Hart's former secretary. In January 2024, the judge rejected Hart's request for a temporary restraining order to force Tasha K to take the interview down.

In July 2024, Soulja Boy sued Tasha K and reality star William The Baddest for defamation, violation of privacy, amongst other allegations over homosexual allegations they spread about him. Although Soulja Boy vehemently denied the allegations, on Tasha K's podcast, William The Baddest claimed that he had a sexual encounter with Soulja Boy, describing explicit details.

In August 2024, a judge dismissed a $360 million lawsuit brought by Bishop Lamor Whitehead, known as "Pastor Bling Bling", against Tasha K. Whitehead sued her for defamation and invasion of privacy over claims she made on her podcast, Unwine With Tasha K, regarding his purchase of a $2 million mansion with just $10. The court ruled that Tasha K's statements were not defamatory and that some were likely accurate.
