= Rutherford High School (Florida) =

Public high school in Panama City, Florida, United States

Location
- 1000 School Avenue; Panama City, Florida; United States; 30°10′01″N 85°36′57″W

Information
- Type: Public High School
- Motto: "And as always, Go Rams"
- Established: 1961
- School district: Bay District Schools
- Principal: Todd Mitchell
- Faculty: 100+
- Teaching staff: 75.98 (FTE)
- Grades: 6-12
- Enrollment: 1,423 (2023-2024)
- Student to teacher ratio: 18.73
- Colors: Black and gold
- Mascot: Ram
- Nickname: Rambunctious
- Rival: Bay High School
- Yearbook: Aries
- Website: rutherfordrams.com

Rutherford High School is a public high school in Panama City, Florida, United States.

The school, which describes itself as the "Home of the Rams" and is a part of the Bay District Schools, opened in 1961 as the second high school in Bay County. It was named after Mr. H.J. Rutherford, a former Board Member. The school held its first graduation ceremony in 1964. The school was accredited by the SACS in 1963. In 2006, Rutherford had a student population of 1,755 students.

Rutherford currently draws its students from the eastern side of Bay County with the majority being the Callaway, Cedar Grove, Springfield, Parker and Tyndall Air Force Base areas respectively.

== Overview ==
Rutherford High School offers several different tracks to its students. Rutherford is host to a chapter of the International Baccalaureate program, Air Force Junior Reserve Officer Training Corps (JROTC), and the Communications and Technology Academy (Com/Tech). In addition, Advanced Placement, dual-enrolled, and honors level courses are available for all students. Extracurricular activities include sports, service clubs, and many other student organizations. Rutherford offers more themed academies than any of the other schools in Bay County.

=== Grades ===
Rutherford High School has consistently been ranked a "B" or "C" grade school under Florida's A++ Plan, the school's 2006–2007 score was "D".

=== Reviews and ratings ===
Rutherford High School has received some negative reviews; e.g. GreatSchools.org gave Rutherford a 4/10 rating, with mixed community reviews.

=== Hurricane Michael ===
As most schools in Panama City, Florida were damaged by Category 5 Hurricane Michael in October 2018, Rutherford High School was used as an emergency shelter during the aftermath. The shelter residents experienced dissatisfaction with the school's role as a shelter. Others recalled its unsanitary conditions such as toilets being clogged with feces, poor quality foods, and the shelter lacking skilled doctors with licenses. After the storm it was announced that Rutherford would temporarily integrate as a 6-12 school for the remainder of the 2018–19 school year and for the 2019–20 school year after the neighboring Everitt Middle School had extensive damage. As of 2024 it is still operating as a 6-12 school as there are had been no plans to rebuild Everitt Middle School.

== Educational programs ==
=== International Baccalaureate ===
International Baccalaureate (IB) began its authorization on campus in 1992. Rutherford High School's IB Program serves as a Magnet Program for the Bay County School District. Cathy Rutland serves as the program's coordinator for the 2015–2016 school year.

IB classes (11th and 12th grade) are offered in six concurrent academic areas: Language A1: (First Language) including the study of selections from World Literature, Language B: (Second Language) or second Language A, Individuals and Societies (Social Sciences), Experimental Sciences, Mathematics, and The Arts and Electives. Pre-IB courses are also offered in all subject areas for 9th and 10th grades.

== Notable alumni ==
- Jay Gainer – American baseball player (born 1966)
- Javien Elliott – American football player (born 1993)
- David Hart – American actor and singer
- Alonzo Johnson – American football player (1963–2024)
- Nick Nelson – American baseball player (born 1995)
- Doug Nettles – American football player (born 1951)
- Nadine Smith – American LGBTQ+ rights activist (born 1965)
- Will Witherspoon – American football player (born 1980)
