= Panama City, Florida =

City in Florida, United States

Panama City
- City
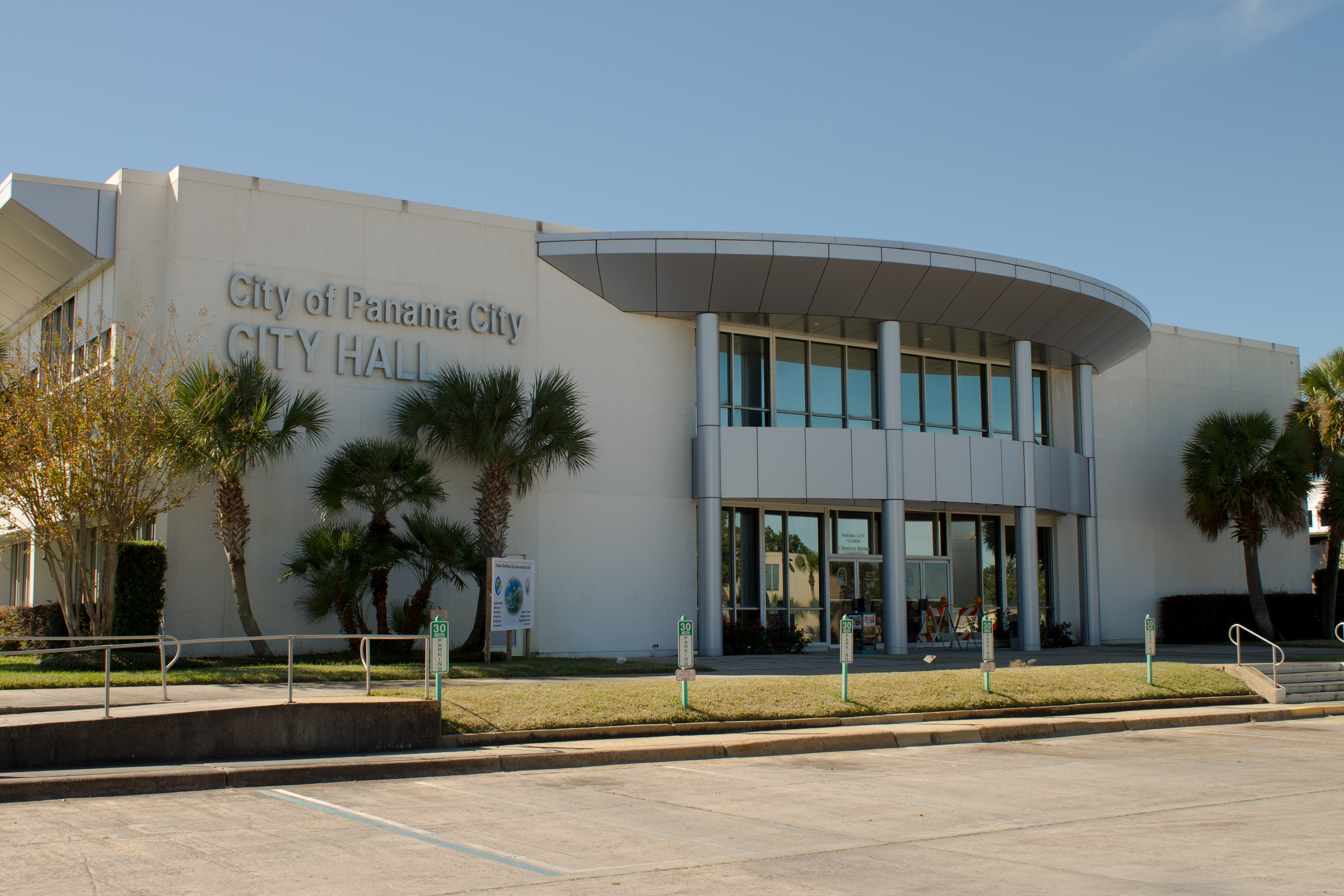
- Panama City's Old city hall in November 2013, prior to Hurricane Michael.

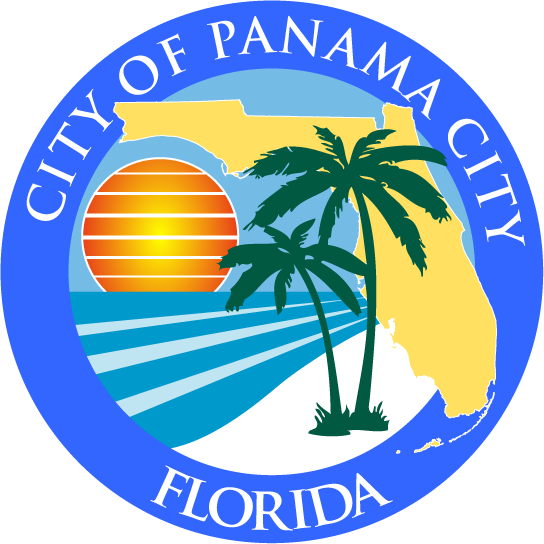
- Seal
- Interactive map outlining Panama City
- Location in Florida Location in the United States
- Coordinates: 30°13′24″N 85°32′05″W
- Country: United States
- State: Florida
- County: Bay
- Settled (Old Town-St. Andrews): c. 1765
- Settled (St. Andrews-Millville-Park Resort-Harrison-Floriopolis): 1827
- Unincorporated (Panama City): 1906
- Incorporated (City of Panama City): 1909
- Named for: Panama City, Panama

Government
  - Mayor: Allan Branch

Area
  - City: 41.27 sq mi (106.90 km^{2})
  - Land: 35.12 sq mi (90.97 km^{2})
  - Water: 6.15 sq mi (15.93 km^{2})
  - Metro: 1,312 sq mi (3,400 km^{2})
- Elevation: 36 ft (11 m)

Population (2020)
  - City: 32,939
  - Density: 937.8/sq mi (362.09/km^{2})
  - Metro: 202,236
- Time zone: UTC-6 (Central (CST))
  - Summer (DST): UTC-5 (CDT)
- ZIP Codes: 32401–32409, 32411–32413, 32417, 32461
- Area codes: 850, 448
- FIPS code: 12-54700
- GNIS feature ID: 2404468
- Website: https://www.panamacity.gov/

Panama City (Note: Officially the City of Panama City.) is a city in and the county seat of Bay County, Florida, United States. Located along U.S. Route 98, it is the largest city between Tallahassee and Pensacola. It is the most populous city in Bay County and a principal city of the Panama City–Panama City Beach, Florida metropolitan statistical area, which has a population around 200,534. According to the 2020 United States census, the city's population was 32,939 (excluding Panama City Beach).

== History ==
=== Name ===
The development in this once-unincorporated part of Northwest Florida was created by combining the settlements and communities of Floriopolis, Harrison, Millville, Park Resort, and St. Andrews. In 1906, the development was named Panama City and it was first incorporated as Panama City in 1909. When Panama City was incorporated, its original city limits were 15th Street/U.S. Highway 98 (US 98) on the north, Balboa Avenue on the west, and Bay Avenue on the east. According to the Panama City Public Library's A History of Panama City, George Mortimer West hoped to spur real estate development in Bay County during a period of intense popular interest in the construction of the Panama Canal by changing the town's name from Harrison to Panama City, because a straight line between Chicago and the Central American country Panama's national capital intersected the Florida town. Additionally, since required meanders around land formations in a seaborne route to the canal added distance when starting at other ports, Panama City was the closest developed port in the U.S. mainland to the Caribbean entrance of the Panama Canal.

== Geography ==
Panama City is located within the Florida panhandle, and along the Emerald Coast.

According to the United States Census Bureau, the city limits encompass an area of 35.4 square miles (91.8 km^{2}), of which 6.2 square miles (16.0 km^{2}), or 17.39%, are covered by water.

=== Climate ===
Panama City has a humid subtropical climate, with short, mild winters and long, hot and humid summers. In January, the average low is 42.6 °F (5.9 °C), and in July the average high is 91.1 °F (32.8 °C).

Due to its location on the Gulf Coast, the city is susceptible to tropical cyclones. Panama City was hit directly by Hurricane Michael on October 10, 2018, which made landfall as a category 5 hurricane. The storm caused catastrophic damage to the city and surrounding communities, with winds of 160 mph (260 km/h) at landfall. The city previously suffered significant indirect impacts from Hurricane Ivan (2004) and Hurricane Opal (1995). Panama City also is affected by tornadoes, having recently been hit by an EF3 tornado on January 9, 2024 and an EF2 tornado on March 18, 2022. The city rarely sees snow, but in the 2025 Gulf Coast blizzard, up to 6.0 inches (15 cm) of snow fell.

Climate data for Panama City 5N, Florida, 1991–2020 normals, extremes 1972–2023
Month	Jan	Feb	Mar	Apr	May	Jun	Jul	Aug	Sep	Oct	Nov	Dec	Year
Record high °F (°C)	80 (27)	88 (31)	89 (32)	93 (34)	100 (38)	101 (38)	101 (38)	102 (39)	98 (37)	97 (36)	91 (33)	84 (29)	102 (39)
Mean maximum °F (°C)	75.5 (24.2)	77.2 (25.1)	81.9 (27.7)	85.7 (29.8)	91.9 (33.3)	95.1 (35.1)	96.4 (35.8)	95.6 (35.3)	94.2 (34.6)	89.4 (31.9)	83.3 (28.5)	77.7 (25.4)	97.8 (36.6)
Mean daily maximum °F (°C)	64.4 (18.0)	67.4 (19.7)	72.9 (22.7)	78.7 (25.9)	85.3 (29.6)	89.3 (31.8)	91.1 (32.8)	90.9 (32.7)	89.0 (31.7)	82.2 (27.9)	73.3 (22.9)	66.5 (19.2)	79.2 (26.2)
Daily mean °F (°C)	53.5 (11.9)	56.7 (13.7)	62.2 (16.8)	68.2 (20.1)	75.5 (24.2)	81.1 (27.3)	83.0 (28.3)	82.8 (28.2)	80.1 (26.7)	71.7 (22.1)	61.7 (16.5)	55.8 (13.2)	69.4 (20.8)
Mean daily minimum °F (°C)	42.6 (5.9)	46.0 (7.8)	51.5 (10.8)	57.8 (14.3)	65.6 (18.7)	72.9 (22.7)	75.0 (23.9)	74.7 (23.7)	71.1 (21.7)	61.2 (16.2)	50.1 (10.1)	45.1 (7.3)	59.5 (15.3)
Mean minimum °F (°C)	25.3 (−3.7)	29.2 (−1.6)	34.7 (1.5)	43.1 (6.2)	52.1 (11.2)	64.6 (18.1)	68.7 (20.4)	67.4 (19.7)	59.7 (15.4)	45.5 (7.5)	34.0 (1.1)	29.3 (−1.5)	24.3 (−4.3)
Record low °F (°C)	6 (−14)	15 (−9)	23 (−5)	34 (1)	40 (4)	46 (8)	56 (13)	59 (15)	45 (7)	33 (1)	25 (−4)	11 (−12)	6 (−14)
Average precipitation inches (mm)	4.79 (122)	4.95 (126)	5.03 (128)	4.09 (104)	3.31 (84)	5.82 (148)	7.41 (188)	7.44 (189)	6.98 (177)	3.45 (88)	3.70 (94)	4.30 (109)	61.27 (1,556)
Average precipitation days (≥ 0.01 in)	8.7	7.6	6.9	6.0	5.4	10.8	12.4	13.6	9.6	5.6	5.7	7.9	100.2
Source 1: NOAA
Source 2: WRCC (extremes)

== Demographics ==
Historical population
Census	Pop.	Note	%±
1910	422		—
1920	1,722		308.1%
1930	5,402		213.7%
1940	11,610		114.9%
1950	25,814		122.3%
1960	33,275		28.9%
1970	32,096		−3.5%
1980	33,346		3.9%
1990	34,378		3.1%
2000	36,417		5.9%
2010	36,484		0.2%
2020	32,939		−9.7%
U.S. Decennial Census

=== Racial and ethnic composition ===
Panama City city, Florida – Racial and ethnic composition Note: the US Census treats Hispanic/Latino as an ethnic category. This table excludes Latinos from the racial categories and assigns them to a separate category. Hispanics/Latinos may be of any race.
Race / Ethnicity (NH = non-Hispanic)	Pop 2000	Pop 2010	Pop 2020	% 2000	% 2010	% 2020
White alone (NH)	26,317	25,021	20,358	72.27%	68.58%	61.81%
Black or African American alone (NH)	7,648	7,921	6,248	21.00%	21.71%	18.97%
Native American or Alaska Native alone (NH)	213	163	152	0.58%	0.45%	0.46%
Asian alone (NH)	560	587	713	1.54%	1.61%	2.16%
Native Hawaiian or Pacific Islander alone (NH)	26	22	20	0.07%	0.06%	0.06%
Other race alone (NH)	23	58	170	0.06%	0.16%	0.52%
Mixed race or Multiracial (NH)	570	868	1,742	1.57%	2.38%	5.29%
Hispanic or Latino (any race)	1,060	1,844	3,536	2.91%	5.05%	10.73%
Total	36,417	36,484	32,939	100.00%	100.00%	100.00%

=== 2020 census ===
As of the 2020 census, Panama City had a population of 32,939. The median age was 41.1 years; 20.8% of residents were under 18 and 19.2% were 65 or older. For every 100 females, there were 93.9 males, and for every 100 females 18 and over, there were 91.8 males 18 and over.

About 99.6% of residents lived in urban areas, while 0.4% lived in rural areas.

Of the 13,559 households in Panama City, 27.0% had children under 18 living in them, 37.5% were married-couple households, 21.2% were households with a male householder and no spouse or partner present, and 33.2% were households with a female householder and no spouse or partner present. About 31.1% of all households were made up of individuals, and 13.2% had someone living alone who was 65 or older.

Racial composition as of the 2020 census
Race	Number	Percent
White	20,907	63.5%
Black or African American	6,322	19.2%
American Indian and Alaska Native	201	0.6%
Asian	722	2.2%
Native Hawaiian and other Pacific Islander	24	0.1%
Some other race	1,608	4.9%
Two or more races	3,155	9.6%

=== 2010 census ===
As of the 2010 United States census, 36,484 people, 15,419 households, and 8,893 families were residing in the city. The population density was 1,245.2 inhabitants per square mile (480.8/km^{2}). The 17,438 housing units had an average density of 595.2 per square mile (229.8/km^{2}).

Of the 15,419 households, 23.6% had children under 18 living with them, 36.3% were headed by married couples living together, 6.8% had a female householder with no husband present, and 41.8% were not families. About 34.1% of all households were made up of individuals, and 13.0% were someone living alone who was 65 or older. The average household size was 2.28, and the average family size was 2.91.

In the city, the age distribution was 20.7% under 18, 10.2% from 18 to 24, 25.9% from 25 to 44, 26.9% from 45 to 64, and 16.3% who were 65 or older. The median age was 39.7 years. For every 100 females, there were 96.3 males. For every 100 females 18 and over, there were 95.2 males.

=== 2000 census ===
As of the 2000 census, the city's median income was $31,572 for a household $40,890 for a family. Males had a median income of $30,401 versus $21,431 for females. The city's per capita income was $17,830. About 12.1% of families and 17.2% of the population were below the poverty line, including 24.5% of those under 18 and 14.9% of those 65 or over.

== Economy ==
=== Industry ===
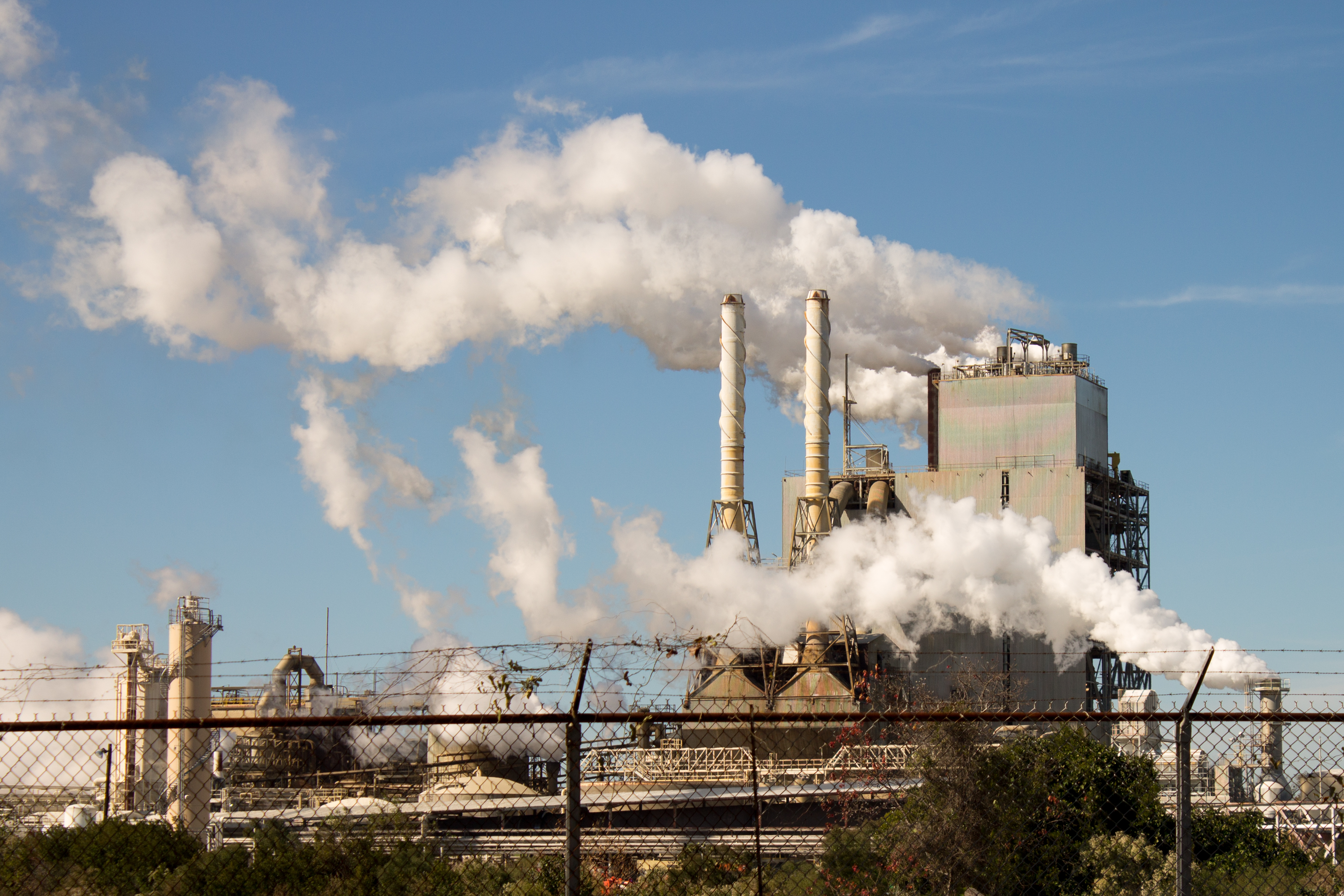
The WestRock paper mill

Two military bases make the federal government the city's largest employer. As of 2024, industrial employers in the Bay County area include Eastern Shipbuilding Group, L-3 Technologies, Oceaneering, Florida Power & Light, Trane, and Jensen-Group.

=== Military ===
Tyndall Air Force Base, to the east, is undergoing a $5.3 billion rebuild to make it the "installation of the future" after Hurricane Michael hit the base in 2018. Naval Support Activity Panama City and Coast Guard Station Panama City are just over the Hathaway Bridge in Panama City Beach. The 153rd Cavalry Regiment, part of the Florida Army National Guard, is headquartered in Panama City with units throughout the panhandle. Panama City is also about 100 miles south of Fort Novosel, Alabama, home to the U.S. Army's Aviation Center of Excellence.

=== Retail ===
The city's main retail center was the Panama City Mall until it was permanently closed after Hurricane Michael. In August 2020, owners of the Panama City Mall released plans to demolish the mall and build a new commercial complex. The plans included a hotel, shops, and restaurants. As of 2023, those plans have not come to fruition. Another local retail center is the Bay City Pointe, on FL 368 (locally known as 23rd St.). Pier Park, on the beach across the Hathaway Bridge spanning St. Andrews Bay, is a third local retail center. Other retail areas in the Panama City metro area are the 15th Street Shopping Strip (An area between Harrison Ave/US Highway 231 and Beck Ave/US Bus 98/State Road 390), 23rd Street Shopping Strip, Downtown Panama City, Historic St. Andrews, and Millville Historic District.

== Education ==
Panama City's public schools are operated by Bay District Schools. Charter schools include:

- Bay Haven (kindergarten-grade 8)
- North Bay Haven (kindergarten-grade 12)
- Palm Bay Academy (grades 6–12)
- The Collegiate School
- University Academy (kindergarten-grade 8)

Public high schools in the Panama City metro area include:

- Rutherford High School
- Bay High School
- A. Crawford Mosley High School
- Arnold High School
- Deane Bozeman Learning Center
- Rosenwald High School

Private schools in the city include:

- Holy Nativity Episcopal School
- St. John Catholic School
- Jacob Austin Prep. Academy
- Covenant Christian School

=== College ===
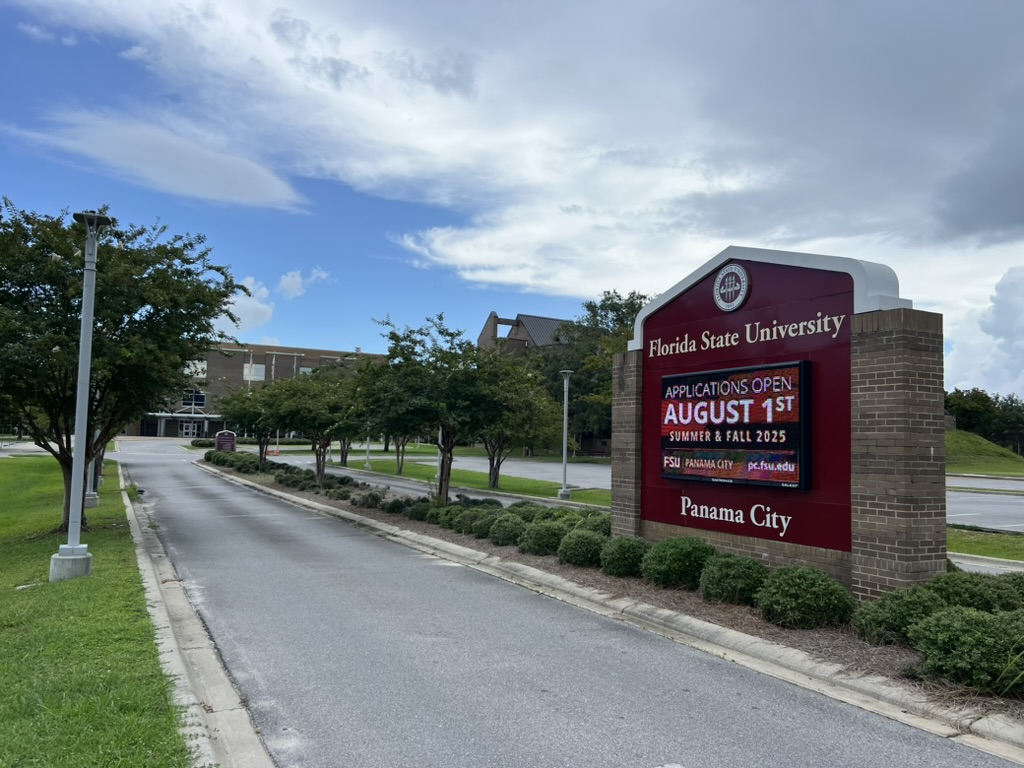
Main entrance of Florida State University–Panama City

Panama City is home to several institutions of higher education. Gulf Coast State College is a public college with its main campus in the city's northwest suburbs. Additionally, the city is home to the Florida State University Panama City campus and a satellite campus of Troy University. Embry–Riddle Aeronautical University also operates a satellite campus at Tyndall Air Force Base. Tom P. Haney Technical College, operated by Bay District Schools, provides vocational training programs as an alternative to traditional college education.

== Media ==
- The News Herald, newspaper
- WJHG, NBC affiliate on channel 7
- WMBB, ABC affiliate on channel 13 with The CW Plus on DT2
- WECP-LD, CBS affiliate on channel 21 with MyNetworkTV on DT2
- WPGX, Fox affiliate on channel 28
- WFSG, PBS affiliate on channel 56 (satellite of WFSU-TV, Tallahassee)
- WPCT – Public-access television cable TV
- WGSX, 104.3 ESPN Northwest Florida, Sports Talk
- WASJ, Bob FM 105.1, 1980s/1990s/2000s
- WBPC, Beach 95.1, Oldies
- WFLF-FM, Fox News Radio
- WFSW, public radio
- WFSY, adult contemporary
- WILN, Island 106, Contemporary hit radio
- WKGC-FM, public radio
- WKNK, Kick'n Country, country
- WPAP, country
- WPFM, K-Love, Contemporary Christian music
- WRBA, Classic Rock 95.9, Classic Rock
- WYOO, Talk Radio 101, Talk Radio
- WYYX, 97X, "Panama City's Rock Station"
- WAYP-FM, 88.3 WAY-FM Christian Hit Radio

== Infrastructure ==
=== Transportation ===
==== Major highways ====
- US 98 (15th Street, 18th Street)
- US 231
- SR 77 (Martin Luther King Jr. Bolevard)
- SR 390 (St. Andrews Bolevard)
- SR 368 (23rd Street)

==== Roads ====
The two main east–west thoroughfares in Panama City proper are 23rd Street and US 98. SR 368 runs east–west across the northern part of the city as a bypass. US 98 runs east–west through the city itself, leading southeast 24 miles (39 km) to Mexico Beach and west 10 miles (16 km) to Panama City Beach.

The two main north–south thoroughfares in the city are Martin Luther King Boulevard, otherwise known as SR 77 and US 231. SR 77 leads north six miles (9.7 km) to the Panama City suburb of Lynn Haven. US 231 begins its national journey northward in the city, leading northeast 83 miles (134 km) to Dothan.

==== Bridges ====
Because of the city's position on St. Andrews Bay, bridges are very important to the area, and most directions into or out of the city require the use of one of three large bridges to cross parts of the bay. These are the Bailey Bridge to the north on Hwy 77, the Dupont Bridge to the south on Hwy 98, and the Hathaway Bridge to the west on Hwy 98. The largest, Hathaway Bridge, is the only direct connection between Panama City and Panama City Beach.

==== Rail ====
The Bay Line Railroad has an 82-mile (132 km) rail line running north to Dothan, Alabama, to a connection with CSX Transportation and Norfolk Southern. Until sometime between 1955 and 1956, the Atlanta and St. Andrews Bay Railroad ran passenger trains from Panama City to Dothan. Additionally, the A&StAB operated sleeping car service to Atlanta from Panama City.

==== Bus transportation ====
Local transit is handled by the Bayway. Service generally runs Monday–Saturday from 6:00 am to 7:00 pm.

==== Air transportation ====
The city was served by the Panama City-Bay County International Airport (PFN) until May 22, 2010. It was replaced by the Northwest Florida Beaches International Airport (ECP) with Southwest Airlines, Delta Air Lines, and United Airlines. In June 2018, ECP also added American Airlines. In 2020, ECP was ranked the fourth-fastest-growing airport in the U.S.

==== Port ====
The Port of Panama City is on St. Andrews Bay.

=== Hospitals ===
The city has two hospitals, Ascension Sacred Heart Bay (known as Bay Medical Sacred Heart until Hurricane Michael destroyed a large portion of it) and HCA Florida Gulf Coast Medical Center.

== Notable people ==
- Robert A. Barth, naval diver
- Mike Campbell, lead guitarist for Tom Petty and the Heartbreakers
- Jaye Chapman, former MLB pitcher
- Donnie Craft, former NFL and CFL player
- Clint Daniels, country music artist
- Daniel Davidson, former MLB pitcher
- Neal Dunn, member of the U.S. House of Representatives
- Javien Elliott, former NFL and CFL player
- Jay Gainer, former MLB player
- Codi Galloway, member of the Idaho House of Representatives
- Clarence Earl Gideon, the plaintiff in Gideon v. Wainwright
- David Hart, actor
- David Herndon, former MLB pitcher with the New York Yankees
- Hulon, smooth jazz saxophonist
- John James, former NFL player
- Alonzo Johnson, former NFL linebacker
- Brandon Jones, former MLB player
- Tasha K, online personality
- Eric Kelly, former NFL player
- Greg Kelser, former NBA player and commentator
- Bob LeBlanc, former NFL player
- Eric Lee, former NFL player
- Cy McClairen, former NFL player
- Robert Lee McKenzie, first mayor of Panama City
- John Robert Middlemas, former representative for Florida
- Kahanna Montrese, drag queen
- Carolyn Murphy, model
- Chip Myers, former NFL player and coach
- Doug Nettles, former NFL player
- Jimmy Patronis, U.S. Representative for Florida's 1st congressional district
- Dan Peek, member of the soft rock band America
- Blake Percival, whistleblower who exposed USIS
- Blood Raw, rapper with the group U.S.D.A and Young Jeezy
- Bert Reed, former NFL player
- Jeff Richards, American football coach at Jacksonville State University
- Janarius Robinson, NFL defensive end for the Kansas City Chiefs
- Kenny Saief, player for the United States men's national soccer team
- Tom Shields, Olympic swimmer
- Anwar Stewart, former CFL defensive lineman and coach at University of Kentucky
- Jim Still, former NFL player
- Khyri Thornton, former NFL player
- Jay Trumbull, member of the Florida House of Representatives
- Thurop Van Orman, made The Marvelous Misadventures of Flapjack
- Jeremiah Warren, former NFL offensive lineman
- Jonathan White, U.S. Navy admiral, leader of the Naval Meteorology and Oceanography Command
- Ray Wilson, NFL defensive back for the New Orleans Saints and Green Bay Packers
- Stacy Wilson, former captain of the Canada women's national ice hockey team
- William Witherspoon, former NFL linebacker

== See also ==
- Port of St. Andrews
