= Deane Bozeman School =

Location
- 13410 Hwy 77; Sand Hills, Florida, 32409; United States; 30.3944°N 85.6859°W

Information
- Type: Public School
- Established: 2000
- School district: Bay District Schools
- Principal: Ivan Beach
- Faculty: 78.59 (FTE)
- Grades: PreK–12
- Enrollment: 1,363 (2019–20)
- Student to teacher ratio: 17.34
- Colors: Navy, Red and White
- Athletics: Football, Basketball, Soccer, Wrestling, Baseball, Track, Softball, Etc.
- Mascot: Bucks
- Accreditation: Florida State Department of Education
- Website: https://www.bozemanbucks.net/

Deane Bozeman School, originally Bozeman Learning Center, is located at 13410 Hwy 77 in Bay County, Florida. The school sits on a 33-acre campus approximately 12 miles north of Lynn Haven in northwest Bay County. It is a part of Bay District Schools.

It serves PreK-12th grade and opened in August, 2000 as a PreK-8th grade school with 750 students. As of 2014 it served 1,300 students. The school's teams compete as the Bucks. The school is named for Deane Bozeman, a long serving Bay County School Board member and volunteer.

The school campus includes two elementary classroom buildings; two middle school classroom buildings; two high school classroom buildings; band, chorus and art facilities; a media center; cafeteria that doubles as a stage; administrative building; and covered elementary physical education pavilion. An art science classroom building and baseball field opened in 2007. The school also has a softball field, tennis courts, track and field area, and a football stadium on campus that is shared with other county schools.
