= Bay High School (Florida) =

Public secondary school in downtown Panama City, Florida, U.S.

Coordinates: 30.169901°N 85.660061°W

- 1200 Harrison Avenue; Panama City, Florida 32401; United States

Information
- Type: Public
- Established: 1924
- School district: Bay County School District
- Principal: Blythe Carpenter
- Faculty: 110
- Grades: 9 to 12
- Enrollment: 1,278 (2023-24)
- Colors: Red, White and Black
- Mascot: Fighting Tornado
- Yearbook: The Pelican
- Website: https://bayhightornadoes.com/

Bay High School is a public secondary school in downtown Panama City, Florida. As one of the oldest continuously accredited public high schools in Florida, the school serves around 1,500 students in grades 9 to 12 in the Bay District Schools.

Bay High School draws the majority of students that live in the Panama City area as well as neighboring communities such as St. Andrews, Glenwood, The Cove, Millville, Pretty Bayou, and Kings Point.

Bay High School was one of the first high schools in the United States to offer the Advanced International Certificate of Education (AICE).

== History ==
Bay High School was established in 1924, in Panama City, Florida. It opened doors on September 13, 1926, as Bay County High School. Its building contained one office, twelve classrooms, and an auditorium during its opening. The school's yearbook theme has been The Pelican since its inception.

In 1945, they established the Tommy Oliver Memorial Stadium, in honor of the namesake of a football player. The original stadium was demolished in 2016, and the school constructed the new Joe and Jeanette Chapman Field at Tommy Oliver Stadium, named after the namesake of the philanthropists. The new stadium began construction at the beginning of the 2016–2017 school year and was completed in the Spring of 2018.

In 1976, the original Bay High building was demolished. In 1977, a new building (now called Building 1) housed the school's offices, as well as two hallways of classrooms.

More additions occurred in 2000, with the construction of a new library building and cafeteria. The new cafeteria was opened to students in 2001.

In 2016, the Washington Post named Bay High School among the most challenging high schools in the United States.

The building built in 1977, was demolition in early 2018.

After the 2021–2022 school year, longtime principal Billy May stepped down. Beginning the 2022–2023 school year, Blythe Carpenter was appointed as the new principal of Bay High School. Carpenter was the first female principal in the school's history.

In 2023, construction of the Barbara W. Nelson Fine Arts Center was completed, and the new building opened in August that year.

=== Hurricane Michael ===
On October 10, 2018, Bay High School suffered extensive damage from the landfall of Category 5 Hurricane Michael . After the storm, more than 60% of students and faculty were housed in temporary modular classrooms. Renovations were made to the school in 2019, which featured a new library, a STEM facility, and a new Fine Arts center. As the 2019–2020 school year began, the first renovations were made to the cafeteria. The next phase included reopening the media center and the band and choir room which also were renovated. In early 2020, all classrooms on campus, with the exception of the Fine Arts classrooms, were back in use.

While temporarily residing in their neighboring Jinks Middle School, whose building was also severely damaged, they partnered with the middle school to host a Thanksgiving community feast, which was featured in ABC's Good Morning America, on November 21, 2018.

In April 2019, the school's students participated at a rally at the Florida State Capitol, in Tallahassee, to press the legislature for relief funding of the school and its district.

In September 2019, the school received criticism when a video, circulated on Facebook, showed unflushed toilets, stalls with no toilet paper, and broken sinks.

== Performing arts ==
=== Million Dollar Band ===
The Million Dollar Band is Bay High School's marching band. It performs at school football games, marching band competitions and festivals, and parades. It is part of the school's band program, which also includes two concert bands, a beginning band, and a jazz band.

In November 2018, after Hurricane Michael struck Panama City, the Million Dollar Band received a hurricane relief fund from Bands of 30A with a check worth US$10,000 to compensate their losses of instruments.

=== Theatre Program ===
In the fall of 2023, the Bay High theatre program staged a production of The SpongeBob Musical. This was the first production to be performed in the school's Barbara W. Nelson Fine Arts Center.

== Notable alumni ==
- James Finch - former owner of NASCAR team, Phoenix Racing
- Eric Kelly - NFL football player
- Tom Martin - MLB player
- Janarius Robinson- NFL football player Las Vegas Raiders
- Anwar Stewart - CFL football player and Hall of Famer
- Khyri Thornton - NFL football player
- Jay Trumbull - American politician and member of the Florida House of Representatives (6th district)
