= Perdido Key, Florida =

- Unincorporated community
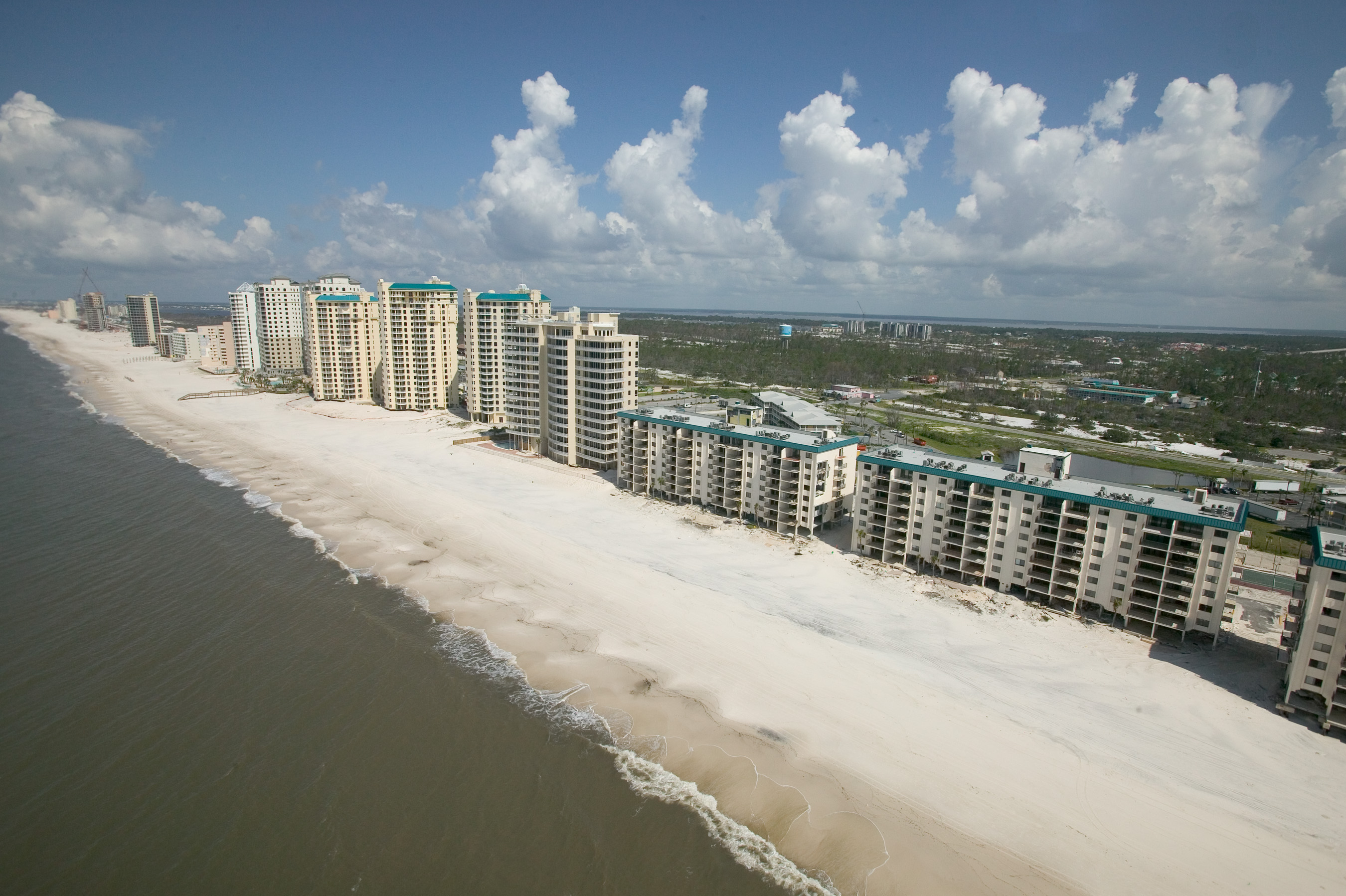
- Perdido Key, July 13, 2005. Impact of Hurricane Dennis
- Nicknames: Perdido, The Key
- Interactive map of Perdido Key, Florida
- Location within Florida
- Coordinates: 30°18′01″N 87°25′39″W
- Country: United States
- State: Florida
- County: Escambia
- Time zone: UTC-6 (CST)
- Area code: 850
- Website: www.visitperdido.com

Perdido Key is an unincorporated community located in Escambia County, Florida, United States, between the cities of Pensacola, Florida and Orange Beach, Alabama. The community is located on and named after Perdido Key, a barrier island in northwest Florida and southeast Alabama. "Perdido" means "lost" in Spanish and Portuguese languages. The Florida district of the Gulf Islands National Seashore includes the east end of the island, as well as other Florida islands. No more than a few hundred yards wide in most places, Perdido Key stretches some 16 miles (26 km) from near Pensacola to Perdido Pass Bridge near Orange Beach.

== History ==
From the beginning of the 17th century, Spanish and French explorers, imagining riches in the New World, began colonizing the northern coast of the Gulf of Mexico. A Spanish expedition from Vera Cruz, Mexico had settled on what became known as Santa Rosa Island on Panzacola Bay, named after the indigenous people, later known as the Pensacola Indians. Panzacola means "the village of hairy people". The French developed a settlement along the coast near Maubila (Mobile). They were competing in this area. Explorers from both countries had heard of a great mysterious body of water to the west of Pensacola, but they were unable to find the entrance.

In 1693 noted cartographer and scientist Carlos de Sigüenza y Góngora was sent by the Spanish government to locate the entrance. Even after he located the mouth of the bay, he was unable to find a waterway deep enough to sail through. According to legend, Siquenza's ship had been blown off course as he was again searching for the pass into the deep inland waters. The ship was spotted by an Indian chief camped with his tribe at Bear Point. As the chief was walking next to the water, he spotted Carlos de Sigüenza y Góngora attempting to reef his sails. He offered to guide Siquenza and his men to a connecting deep water channel from the Gulf of Mexico into the more tranquil bay. When the search party finally located the elusive bay, they called it Perdido, which in Spanish means "lost" or "hidden".

Early maps indicate that, at the time, the pass was located on or very near to today's official State boundary between Alabama and Florida. Hurricanes and other forces—natural as well as man-made—have moved the pass back and forth several times to where it lies now in Orange Beach, Alabama, approximately 3 miles (4.8 km) from the Florida boundary.

== Segregation ==
Pensacola Beach was once 'whites only' and what is now The Gulf Islands National Seashore was one of the few beaches near Pensacola that was African American friendly.

Army Private Rosamond Johnson, Jr. was the first Escambia County resident to die in the Korean War on July 26, 1950. He successfully carried two wounded soldiers to safety and was returning with a third when he was fatally wounded. He joined the military at age 15 and died at 17. He posthumously received the Purple Heart on August 21, 1950 and several veteran groups are still working to see if Johnson deserved additional military honors. During the early days of integrated military it was not uncommon for recognition to be overlooked for black troops.

Pensacola beaches were racially segregated at the time of Johnson's death; the Gulf beach area was a popular area for blacks. After the Korean War, the county-owned recreational area was renamed to honor its fallen hero at the suggestion of the Sunset Riding Club, Inc. The club had leased the land in 1950 from the county for the sole use of bathing, beach and recreational facilities for "colored citizens". Although the lease was canceled in 1956, the name Rosamond Johnson Beach remained. The area became part of Gulf Islands National Seashore on May 8, 1973.

A permanent monument in Johnson's honor was erected at Johnson Beach on June 10, 1996. Guest speaker, retired Army Maj. Gen. Mike Ferguson of Pensacola and the Veterans of Under Aged Military Service officiated the ceremony.

== Geography ==
Perdido Bay is said to have once had an estimated 300 natural springs bubbling up from the sandy bottom. There were so many around the site of the Lillian bridge that when construction began, bridge engineers were appalled to see pilings sinking down below the surface, following the soft course of a natural spring. They had to devise a solution, which was building cofferdams to shore up the pilings to prevent them from sinking.

Around 1933 Perdido Key became an island. Before then, the area was a small peninsula just to the west of Pensacola. It was crossed by a large ditch that was narrow enough to jump across, and sometimes filled with alligators. This ditch was improved and widened to become part of the Intracoastal Waterway in 1933.

The Intracoastal Waterway (ICW) connecting Pensacola to Mobile Bay, the Gulf Intracoastal Waterway, was started during 1931 during the Great Depression. The digging that would connect Pensacola, Big Lagoon (also known as Grande Lagoon), Perdido Bay, and Mobile Bay was completed in 1933. Perdido Key Island is now about 16 miles (26 km) long with almost 60% of it (9.5 miles) protected in federal or state parks.

In 1978 the National Park Service completed purchase of over 1,000 acres (4.0 km^{2}) of land on Perdido Key from Johnson Beach to Pensacola Pass for about $8 million. For years this area was called Gulf Beach, and it evolved into being called Perdido Key. Many "old timers" still slip and call the area Gulf Beach.

On September 22, 2020, Hurricane Sally split a disconnected and undeveloped stretch of the barrier island into three smaller islands.

== Environment ==
Environmentalists and outdoor enthusiasts visit Perdido Key due to the miles of protected beach wilderness; along with the Navarre Beach Marine Park and the many miles of Gulf Islands National Seashore, the protected coastlines are a signature of the Pensacola Bay area and the remainder of Northwest Florida. Perdido Key's two state parks and an expanse of National Seashore offer chances to spot gray foxes and blue herons in the wild. Local outfitters offer guided tours, and self-guided nature trails at Big Lagoon and Johnson Beach allow solitude.

=== Perdido Key Beach Dune Habitat ===
The azure waters of the Gulf of Mexico frame the white beaches. These beaches and their dune habitat host a variety of visitors and residents throughout the year.

The beach dune habitat of Perdido Key is characterized by several rows of sand dunes. "Frontal" or "primary" dunes are vegetated with grasses including sea oats, bunch grass, and beach grass. Among other plants growing in primary dunes are Florida rosemary, railroad vine and beach morning glories. "Secondary" dunes, further inland, support saw palmetto, slash and sand pines, and scrubby shrubs and oaks. Growing among the dunes are such species as cordgrass, salt-grass, pine trees, purslane and pennywort.

The scrub and grasses growing on the dunes are vital to the health of Perdido Key's beach habitat. The roots of plants are the "fingers" which hold sand in place, preventing it from blowing away in the wind or washing away in the tidal surge of Hurricane or other storms. Without the critical holding power of dunes and their plants, the beaches would blow and erode away.

The dune restoration project on Perdido Key is restoring or planting the following native plants:

Sand plants:

- sea oats (Uniola paniculata)
- saltmeadow cordgrass (Spartina patens)
- coastal panicgrass (Panicum amarum)

Estuarine plants:

- turtle grass (Thallassia testudinum)
- salt marsh cordgrass (Spartina alterniflora)
- black needle rush (Juncus romerianus)

=== Wildlife ===
Perdido Key is home to the endangered Perdido Key beach mouse. The small white and gray mouse, weighing 13-16 grams, blends in with the white quartz sand of northern Gulf coast beaches. While the Perdido Key beach mouse feeds primarily on the seeds of sea oats and bluestem, it will occasionally eat insects.

The Perdido Key beach mouse was listed as an endangered species in 1985. Loss of habitat to development is considered to be the main factor leading to the decline of the species. Hurricanes have also taken their toll on the mouse. The beach mouse population at Perdido Key was nearly eliminated in the mid-1990s when hurricanes Erin and Opal ravaged Perdido Key. Numbering less than 40 after the storms, the mice have regenerated quite well, with current population estimates near 500. While populations appear to be growing, the Perdido Key Beach Mouse will probably never make it off the endangered species list because of continued habitat loss and degradation due to human development in the area.

Other species find the white sands attractive as seasonal homes or for nesting before returning to sea. Two such visitors are the piping plover and the sea turtle.

The sea turtle is another endangered visitor to Perdido Key. Loggerhead, leatherback, ridley, and green sea turtles arrive between May and September to dig nest cavities in the sand into which 100 or more eggs are laid. About two months later, provided the nest has not been washed away, uncovered by high winds, or disturbed by predators or beach visitors, turtle hatchlings emerge. Following the brightest spot in the sky, which is usually the horizon over the water, hatchlings scramble for the sea. With development on barrier islands, lights of convenience stores, hotels and businesses (see Light pollution ) have made the trek to the sea confusing and dangerous. Few hatchlings are successful in their first adventure. Less than 1% of hatchlings survive their first year and grow old enough to return to Perdido Key to resume the cycle.

Shorebirds including black skimmers, gulls, terns, and brown pelicans are among the birds which rest on the island, nest, or feed offshore. Neotropical birds, such as warblers and cedar waxwings, live in the tropics and travel to North America to breed, stopping over to feed and rest at Perdido Key. Monarch butterflies migrating to and from South America stop here, finding refuge on the sea oats growing in the dunes of Perdido Key.

== Local attractions ==
To the south of Perdido Key is the Gulf of Mexico, with its white sand beaches and sometimes clear blue waters. North of Perdido Key are Old River and the Intracoastal Waterway. Just north of Old River is the private Ono Island. North of Ono and separated by the Intracoastal Waterway (ICW) is a small area called Innerarity Point, Florida and Innerarity Island. This small, private gated island community has mostly single-family homes with a few townhomes at the entrance.

Almost all of these waterways are accessible by boat. They lead to the Gulf of Mexico via the Alabama Pass in Orange Beach or the major harbor entrance of Pensacola Pass. These waterways are: Old River, Intracoastal Waterway (ICW), Perdido Bay, Pensacola Bay, Escambia Bay, Black Water River, Perdido River, Styx River, and a myriad of boatable canals, bayous and lakes. The inland waterways have historically given protection from the storms and hurricanes which have occurred in this area. This area has many homes lining the waterfront.

=== Gulf Islands National Seashore / Rosamond Johnson Beach (National Park Service) ===
Located on the eastern end of Perdido Key, it is open from 5 a.m. to 8 p.m. It has picnic shelters, restrooms, showers, and seasonal lifeguards. The site of Fort McRee is located at the eastern tip of Johnson Beach and is accessible by boat or foot only. On the Sound side, there is a half-mile self-guided nature trail that winds past a salt marsh and through a maritime forest. The nature trail is wheelchair accessible. (Note: Nature Trail has been closed since September 2020 due to damage from Hurricane Sally. No re-opening date has been set).

Visitors are advised to observe surf warnings posted in the park. Two red flags means the water is closed to the public. A purple flag means dangerous sea life such as sharks or jellyfish are present. Rip currents are common due to shifting sands, especially after tropical storms. Visitors with small children are advised to stay in the main pavilion area under the supervision of the lifeguard. Lifeguards are typically on duty only from Memorial Day weekend through Labor Day weekend every year.

=== Big Lagoon State Recreation Area ===
This area is named for the bordering body of water called Big Lagoon. The Park of 678 acres (2.74 km^{2}) upland was opened in 1978. The Cookie Trail is maintained by the Girl Scouts. Natural habitat includes numerous birds and animals: gray foxes, raccoons, skunks, opossums, great blue herons and other waterfowl, in addition to a variety of other birds. The park has more than 75 campsites; five picnic areas with shelters, a 500-seat amphitheater; boat ramp with dock; boardwalks and nature trails; and an observation tower offering a panoramic view of Big Lagoon, the park, and Gulf Islands National Seashore across the Intracoastal Waterway. it is located at 12301 Gulf Beach Highway, Pensacola, just north of the community of Perdido Key.

=== Perdido Key State Recreation Area ===
Perdido Key State Recreation Area encompasses 247 acres (1.00 km^{2}) on a barrier island, which buffers the mainland from winds and threatening tides, and provides habitat for shore birds and other coastal animals. Saltwater fishing licenses are required. Occupied shells are alive and should be left alone. The wide white sand beaches and the rolling dunes covered with sea oats make this a pristine oasis along the rapidly developing Florida Panhandle. Picnic shelters are between the Gulf and the Old River, which bounds Perdido Key on the north.
