= Ono =

ONO, Ono or Ōno may refer to:

== Places ==
=== Fiji ===
- Ono Island (Fiji)

=== Israel ===
- Kiryat Ono
- Ono, Benjamin, ancient site

=== Italy ===
- Ono San Pietro

=== Ivory Coast ===
- Ono, Ivory Coast, a village in Comoé District

=== Japan ===
- Ōno Castle, Fukuoka
- Ōno District, Fukui
- Ōno District, Gifu
- Ōno District, Ōita
- Ōno, Chita District, Aichi
- Ōno, Fukui
- Ono, Fukushima
- Ōno, Gifu
- Ōno, Hiroshima
- Ōno, Hokkaidō
- Ono, Hyōgo
- Ōno, Ibaraki
- Ōno, Iwate
- Ōno, Ōita
- Ōno River, in Ōita Prefecture

=== United States ===
- Ono Island (Alabama)
- Ono, California
- Ono, Kentucky
- Ono, Pennsylvania
- Ono, Wisconsin

== People and language ==
- Ono (surname), including a list of people bearing the name
- Ono language

== ONO ==
- The FAA identifier of Ontario Municipal Airport in Ontario, Oregon
- Organization of News Ombudsmen (ONO)
- Ono (Spain), a Spanish defunct cable company
- ONO, the name Yoko Ono uses for releasing remixes of her own work
- ONO (band), an experimental music group from Chicago

== Other uses ==
- Ono (P2P), a peer-to-peer file transfer system to find nearby peers
- Ono (weapon), a Japanese axe
- USS Ono, the name of a number of United States Navy ships
- Ono, an alternate name for the Wahoo, a fish found in Hawaiian waters
- Ono (more precisely O'NO 99) was a 1970s card game similar to Uno
- Ono, a character in the animated television series The Lion Guard

== See also ==
- Ohno's hypothesis, an alternate name for the 2R hypothesis, named for Susumu Ohno
- Oh No (disambiguation)
