= Innerarity Point, Florida =

- Unincorporated community
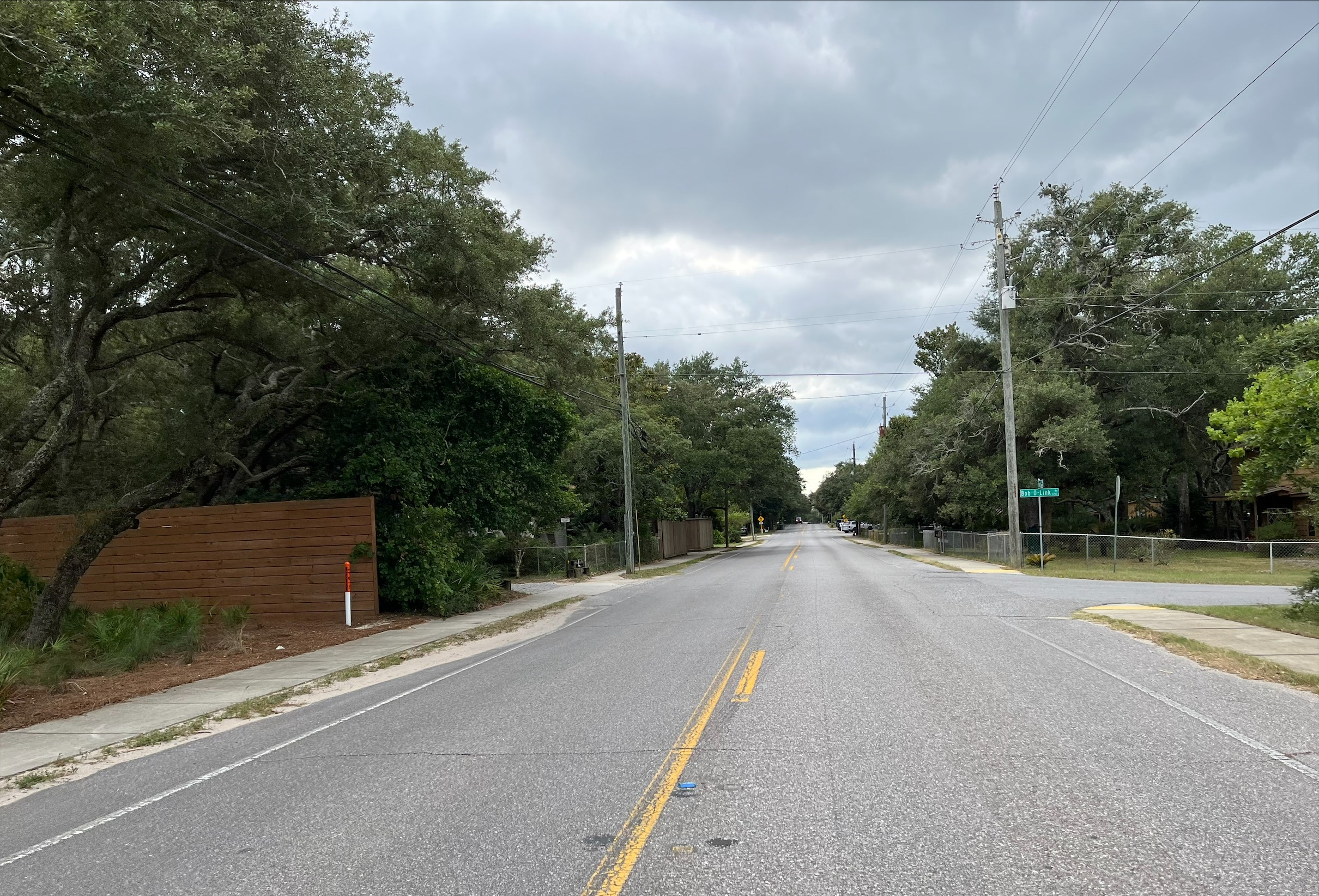
- Innerarity Point Road in Innerarity Point

- Location within the state of Florida
- Coordinates: 30°18′53″N 87°26′46″W
- Country: United States
- State: Florida
- County: Escambia
- Elevation: 7 ft (2.1 m)
- Time zone: UTC-6 (Central (CST))
  - Summer (DST): UTC-5 (CDT)
- GNIS feature ID: 284547

Innerarity Point is an unincorporated community in Escambia County, Florida, United States. It is part of the Pensacola–Ferry Pass–Brent Metropolitan Statistical Area. Innerarity Point is located along Perdido Bay north of Perdido Key.

== History ==
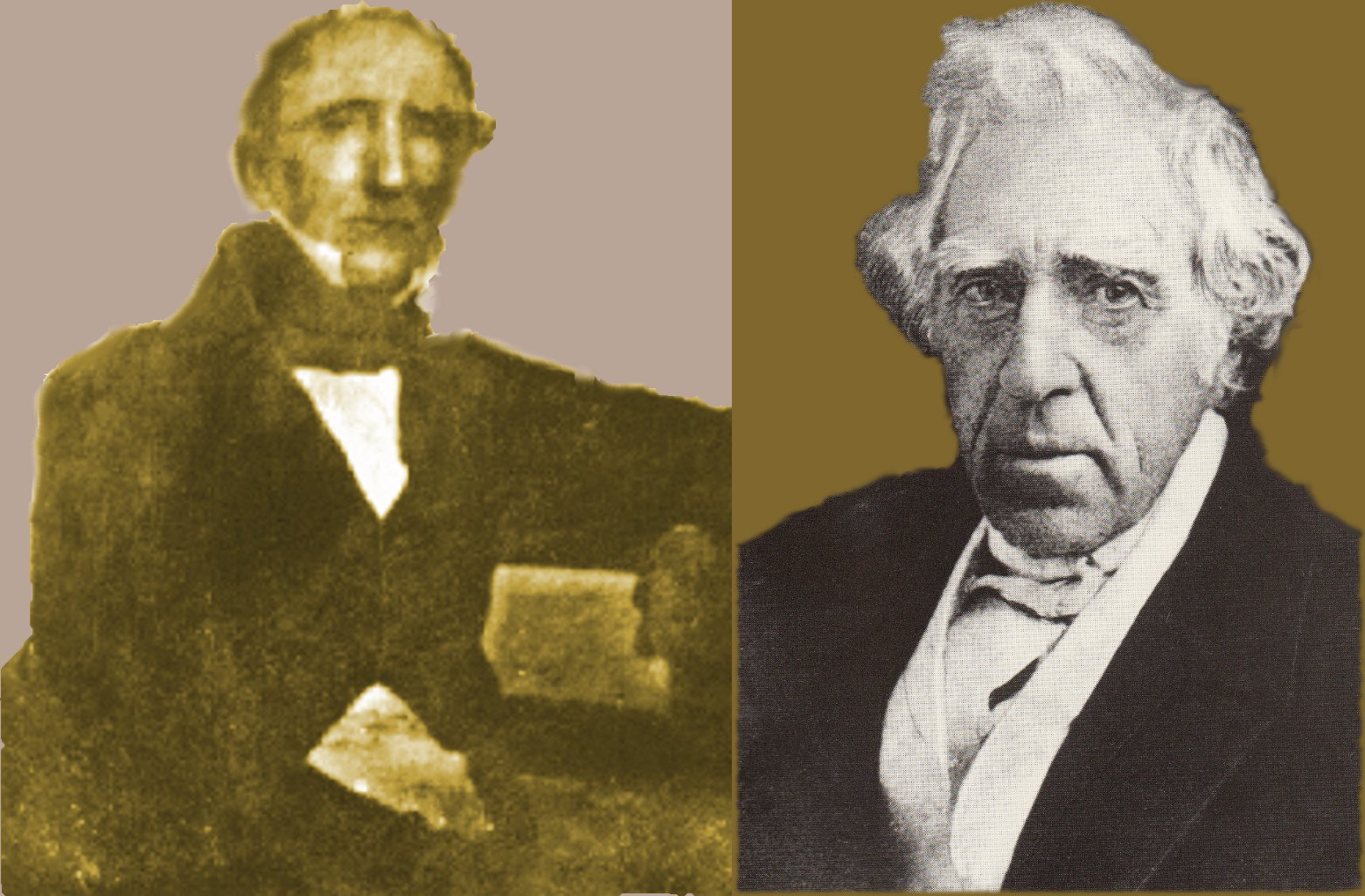
James Innerarity (left; 1777–1847) and his brother John (right; 1783–1854)

The area around Innerarity Point has shown evidence of being settled by the Pensacola culture or the Mississippian culture at the nearby Hickory Ridge Cemetery Archeological Site.

The community is named for Innerarity Point, the peninsula on which the community is located. Sources differ on the origin of the name of Innerarity Point: some sources state it was named for John Innerarity, a clerk for John Forbes and Company and longtime Pensacola resident who in 1815 was granted land from the Spanish government that included the peninsula. Other sources state the peninsula was named for a pirate with the surname of Innerarity.

Innerarity Point was originally granted to Ignacio Sierra, a native of Spain, prior to being deeded to John Innerarity.

In the 1830s, the United States Army Corps of Engineers proposed constructing a road that would connect Pensacola, Mobile Point, and Mobile. This road would cross the Perdido River at Innerarity Point, but due to expected difficulties with maintenance, the road was never constructed.

By the 1920s, vacation homes were being built in Innerarity Point, including homes owned by the du Pont family. In 1925, multiple investors including Will H. Hays, Douglas Fairbanks, and Mary Pickford, purchased land in Innerarity Point.

Innerarity Point Park was built with funds from the Deepwater Horizon Oil Spill Trust.
