= 1923 Atlantic hurricane season =

- Season summary map

Seasonal boundaries
- First system formed: June 19, 1923
- Last system dissipated: October 26, 1923

Strongest storm
- Name: Five
  - Maximum winds: 120 mph (195 km/h) (1-minute sustained)
  - Lowest pressure: 965 mbar (hPa; 28.5 inHg)

Seasonal statistics
- Total depressions: 11
- Total storms: 9
- Hurricanes: 4
- Major hurricanes (Cat. 3+): 1
- Total fatalities: 15
- Total damage: > $1.335 million (1923 USD)

Related articles
- 1920–24 Pacific hurricane seasons; 1920–1937 Pacific typhoon seasons; 1920s North Indian Ocean cyclone seasons

The 1923 Atlantic hurricane season featured 11 tropical cyclones, 9 of which intensified into tropical storms, the most since 1916. Four of the tropical storms intensified into hurricanes, one of which reached major hurricane intensity—Category 3 or higher on the modern-day Saffir–Simpson hurricane wind scale. No tropical storms or hurricanes formed in or entered the Caribbean Sea. The first known system, a tropical depression, formed on June 19, while the last known system, a tropical storm, transitioned into an extratropical cyclone on October 26. Additionally, an October tropical depression was previously recognized as a tropical storm until reanalysis in 2009, while the first and third tropical storms were added to the Atlantic hurricane database that year. The sixth, seven, and eight storms as well as the October tropical depression existed simultaneously on October 16.

Four tropical cyclones made landfall in the United States during 1923, with three striking the Gulf Coast of the United States and the other hitting Massachusetts. The first of the four, which struck Louisiana in June, mostly produced excessive rainfall along the Gulf Coast and parts of the East Coast. A storm which formed in the eastern Pacific basin around October 12 struck Louisiana as a Category 1 hurricane on October 16. The system caused some damage to coastal areas, especially between New Orleans, Louisiana, and Pensacola, Florida. Just two days later, a tropical storm also struck Louisiana; it caused less damage, though four people died after a ship capsized in Perdido Bay. On October 19, a cyclone struck Massachusetts, but produced mostly beneficial rainfall in New England. The fifth system and the October tropical depression caused significant impact as extratropical cyclones. The former left at least 9 deaths and about $300,000 (1923 USD) in damage in Atlantic Canada, while the latter was attributed to 2 fatalities and more than $1 million in damage along the East Coast of the United States.

The season's activity was reflected with an accumulated cyclone energy (ACE) rating of 49 units, well below the 1921–1930 average of 76.6. ACE is a metric used to express the energy used by a tropical cyclone during its lifetime. Therefore, a storm with a longer duration will have high values of ACE. It is only calculated at six-hour increments in which specific tropical and subtropical systems are either at or above sustained wind speeds of 39 mph (63 km/h), which is the threshold for tropical storm intensity. Thus, tropical depressions are not included here.

== Systems ==
=== Tropical Storm One ===
- Tropical storm (SSHWS)
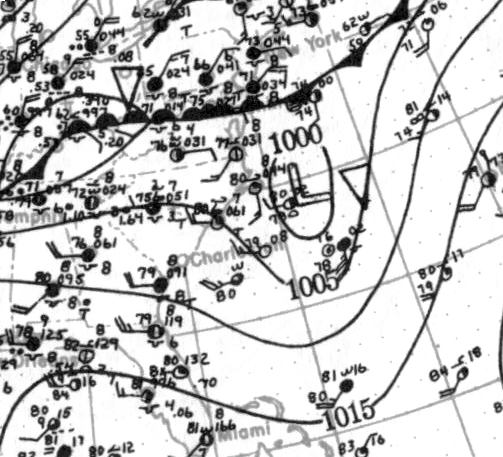
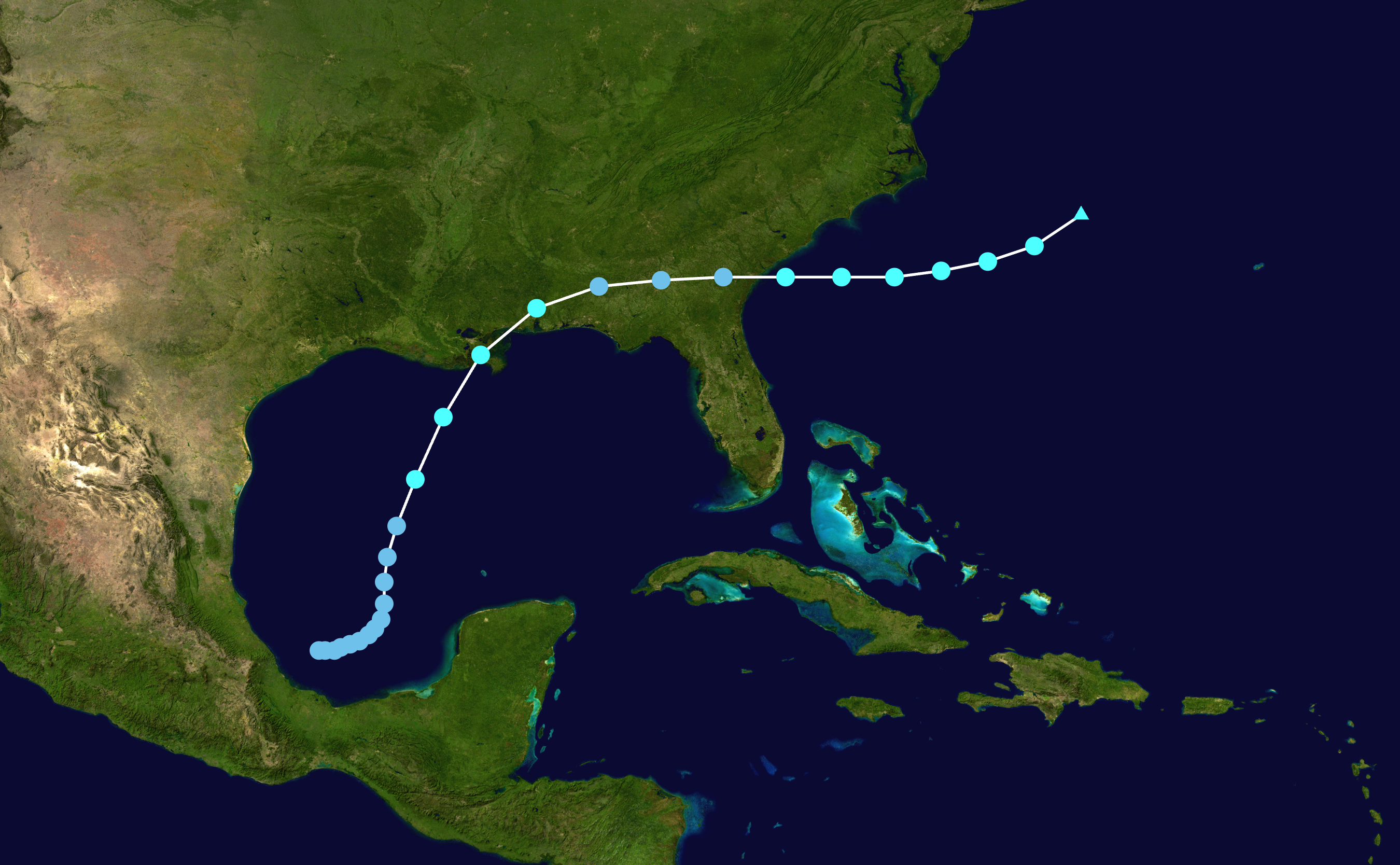
- Duration: June 22 – June 28
- Peak intensity: 60 mph (95 km/h) (1-min); <999 mbar (hPa)

Early on June 22, a broad area of low pressure was observed in the Bay of Campeche where it intensified into a tropical depression later that day. It remained at that intensity for the next three days while drifting slowly northeastward, while its pressure continued to gradually fall. By late June 25 it had begun to become better organized and move more swiftly to the north-northeast as a tropical storm. The storm clipped the southeastern Louisiana coastline and made landfall as a minimal tropical storm over extreme southern Mississippi and Alabama on June 26. The system weakened into a tropical depression while over southeastern Alabama late on June 26.

The cyclone turned in a more easterly direction under the influence of an extratropical low. On June 27, it regained tropical storm intensity as it reached the Atlantic Ocean off the Georgia–South Carolina coast. On June 28, the cyclone reached a peak intensity of 60 mph (95 km/h) and a peripheral pressure of 999 mbar (29.5 inHg). At this time, the extratropical low to the northwest began to affect this tropical storm more heavily, causing it to lose tropical characteristics around 00:00 UTC on June 29. Excessive rains fell in the vicinity of the cyclone and farther up the East Coast of the United States, which mostly proved beneficial, especially for cotton crops in North Carolina and South Carolina. This storm was first introduced to the Atlantic hurricane best track in a 2009 reanalysis of the season.

=== Hurricane Two ===
- Category 2 hurricane (SSHWS)
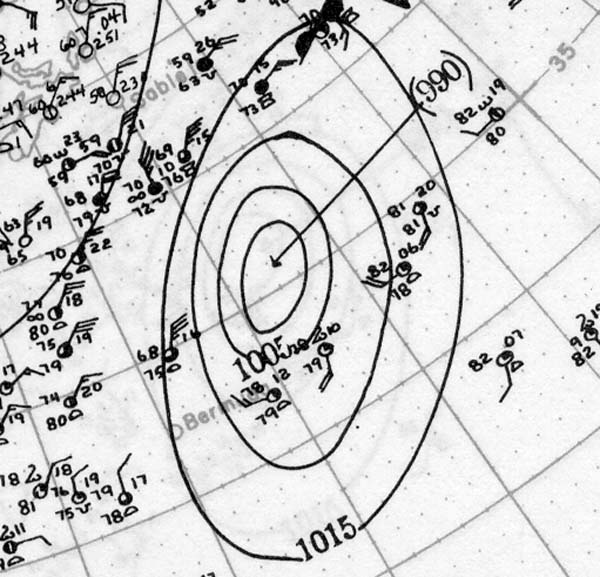
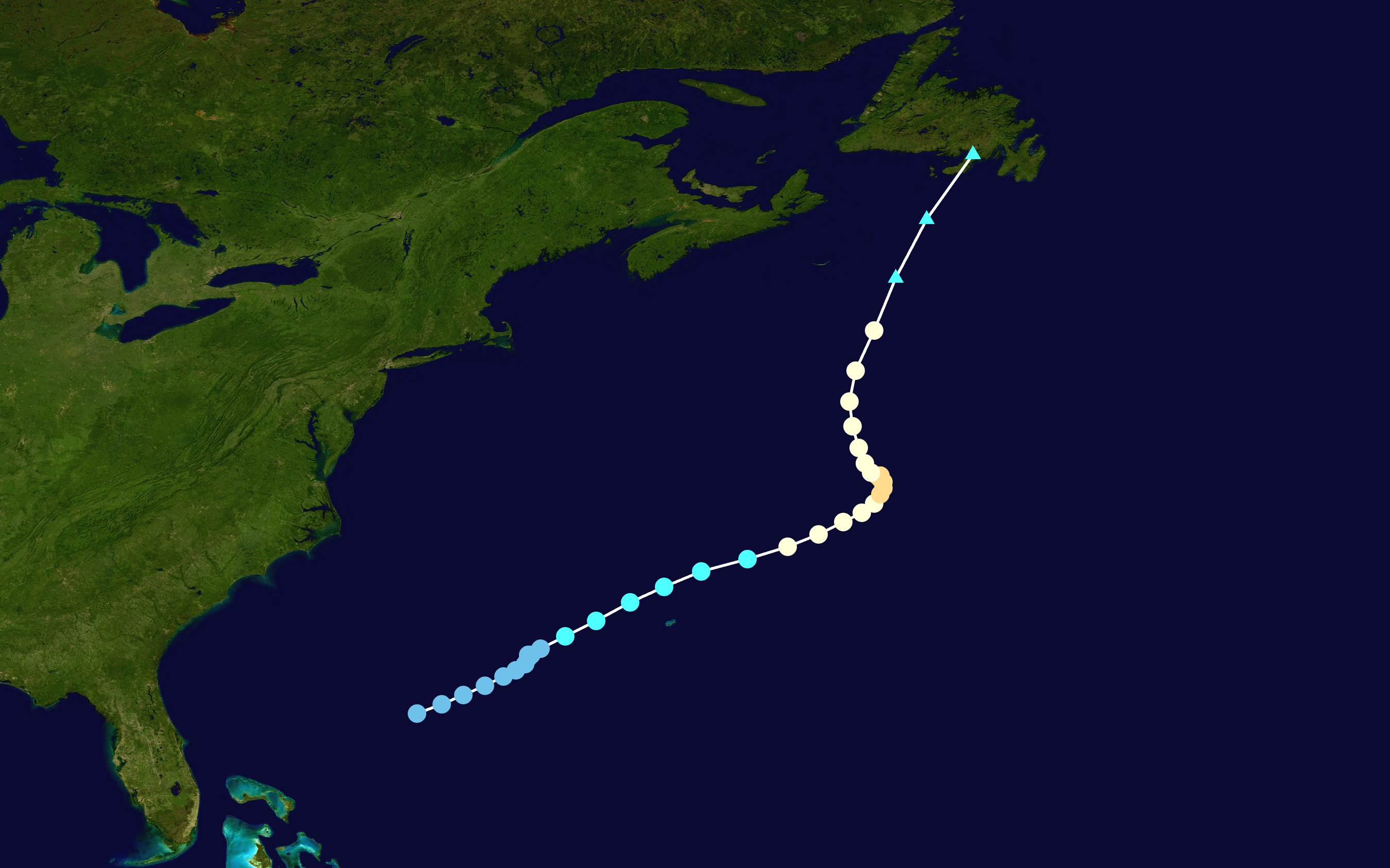
- Duration: September 1 – September 9
- Peak intensity: 105 mph (165 km/h) (1-min); <989 mbar (hPa)

Around August 31, a low-pressure area formed along the tail end of a cold front extending from the Bahamas to Bermuda. Early on the following day, a tropical depression developed roughly 510 mi (820 km) east-southeast of Jacksonville, Florida. The depression moved slowly east-northeastward as the cold front dissipated. Late on September 3, the system intensified into a tropical storm, and the next day the cyclone passed northwest of Bermuda. Based on observations from the S.S. Evergreen City, the small storm likely reached Category 1 hurricane intensity early on September 5. The cyclone continued to strengthen, reaching Category 2 intensity on September 6 while drifting northward and then peaking with maximum sustained winds of 105 mph (165 km/h) early the following day. On September 8, the system curved northwestward and weakened to a Category 1 hurricane. The storm then turned north-northeastward on September 9 and transitioned into an extratropical cyclone later that day. The extratropical low continued north-northeastward until dissipating over southern Newfoundland on September 10. Cape Race observed sustained winds of 29 mph (47 km/h).

=== Tropical Storm Three ===
- Tropical storm (SSHWS)
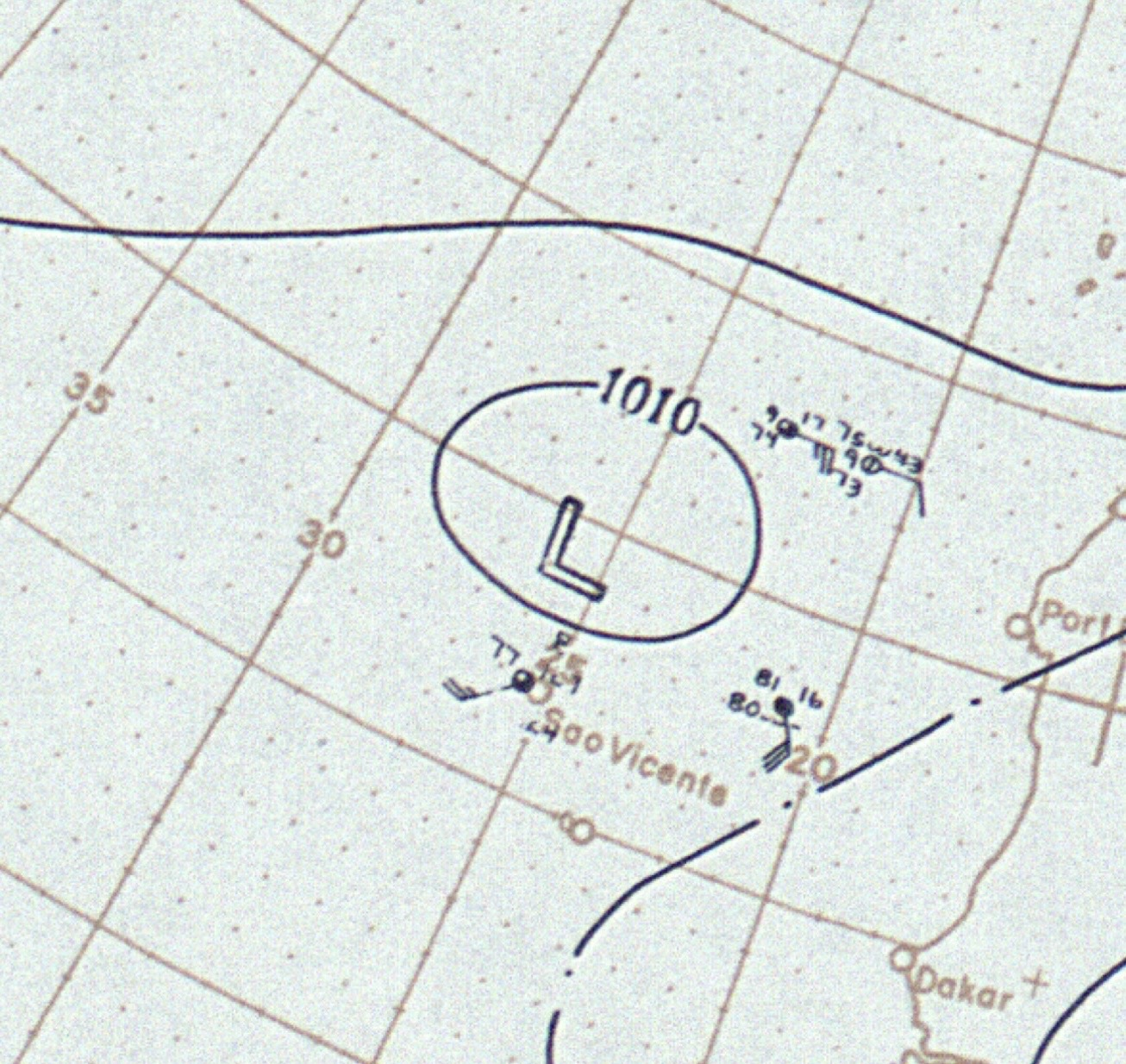
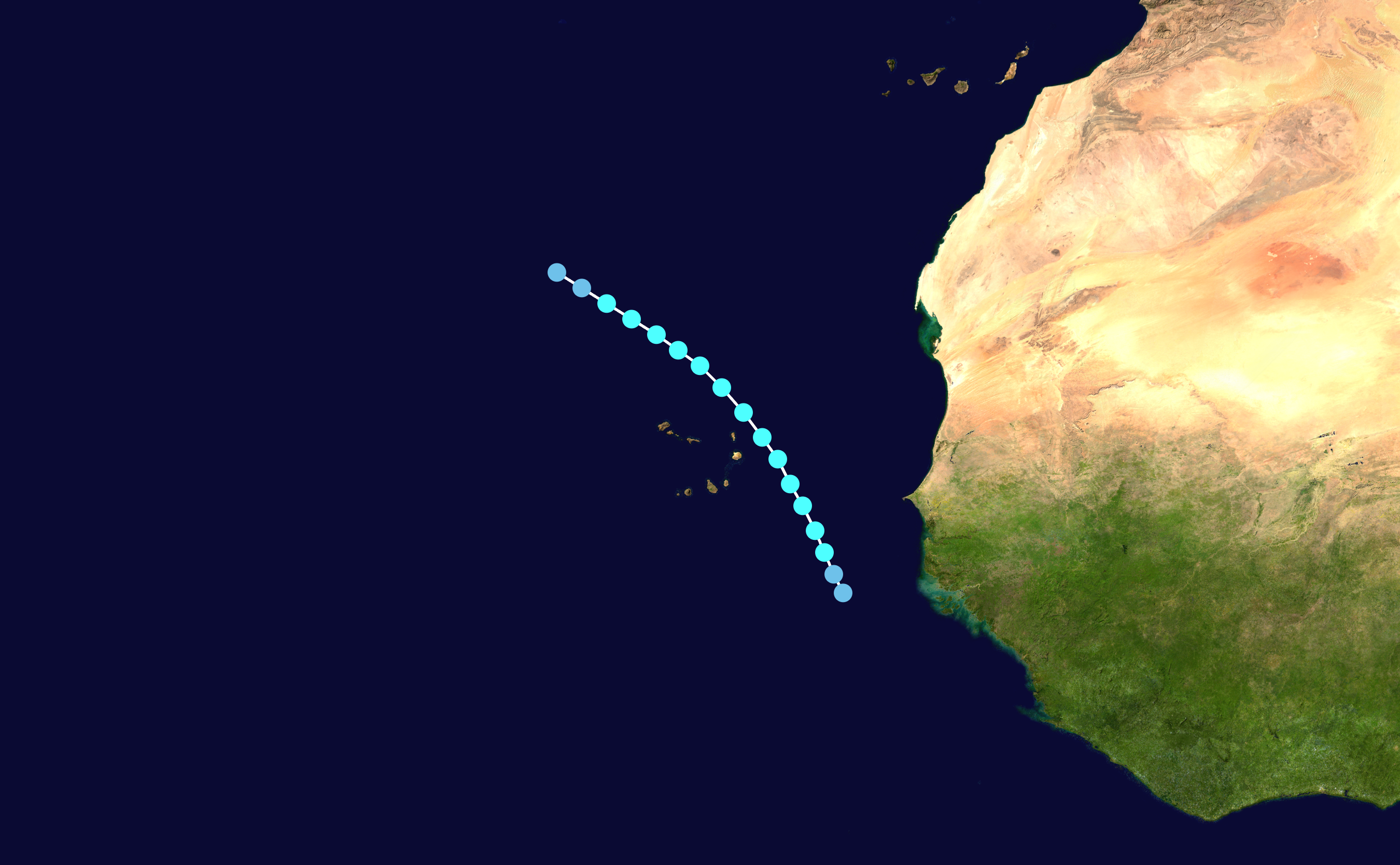
- Duration: September 7 – September 11
- Peak intensity: 50 mph (85 km/h) (1-min); <1000 mbar (hPa)

Early on September 7, a tropical depression developed over the far eastern Atlantic about 225 mi (360 km) southwest of Banjul, The Gambia. The depression moved north-northwest and intensified into a tropical storm later that day. Around 12:00 UTC on September 8, the cyclone peaked with maximum sustained winds of 50 mph (85 km/h). The storm then curved northwestward early the next day. Late on September 10, the system weakened to a tropical depression and then dissipated at 00:00 UTC on September 11 while situated about 410 mi (660 km) northwest of Santo Antão in the Cabo Verde Islands. This system was not entered into the Atlantic hurricane best track until reanalysis of the season in 2009.

=== Hurricane Four ===
- Category 1 hurricane (SSHWS)
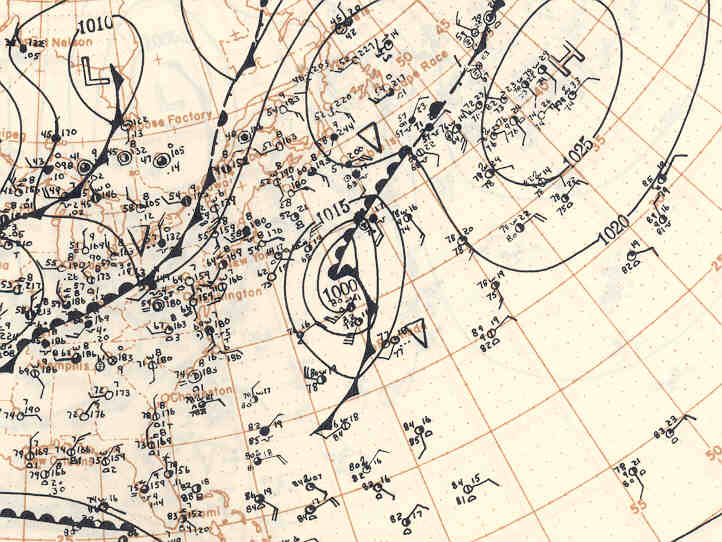
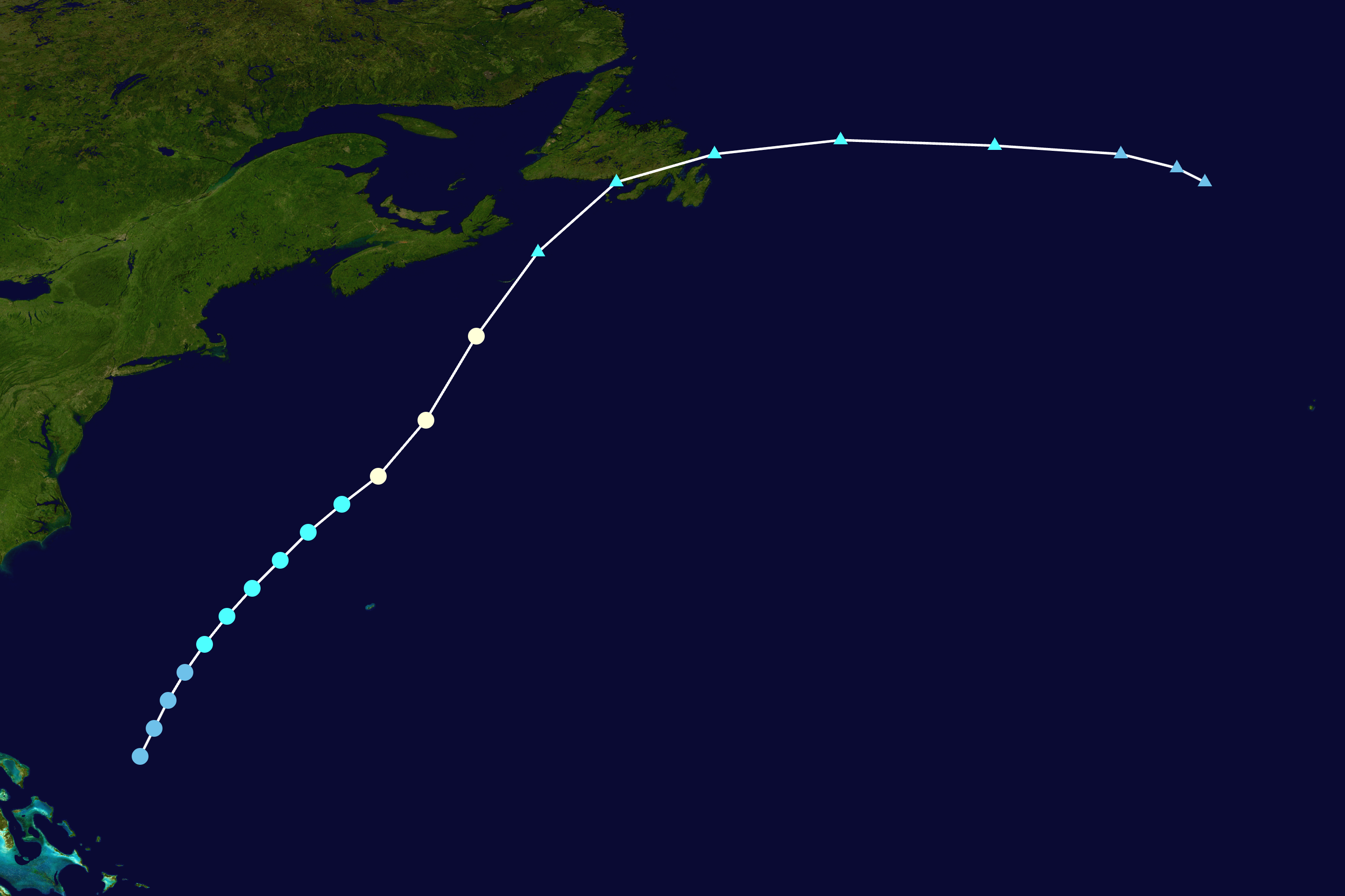
- Duration: September 10 – September 13
- Peak intensity: 80 mph (130 km/h) (1-min); <986 mbar (hPa)

A low-pressure area developed into a tropical depression at 00:00 UTC on September 10, approximately 230 mi (370 km) northeast of Eleuthera Island in the Bahamas. Tracking to the northeast, the depression intensified into a tropical storm about 24 hours later. Based on observations from the S.S. Emergency Aid and S.S. City of Joseph, the cyclone strengthened into a Category 1 hurricane around 12:00 UTC on September 12. The hurricane peaked with maximum sustained winds of 80 mph (130 km/h). Accelerating rapidly northeastward, the system transitioned into an extratropical storm early on September 13 while situated about 120 mi (195 km) southeast of Sydney, Nova Scotia. The extratropical low struck Newfoundland later that day and then moved eastward over the Atlantic before dissipating by September 15. In Newfoundland, Cape Race recorded a sustained wind speed of 29 mph (47 km/h).

=== Hurricane Five ===
- Category 3 hurricane (SSHWS)
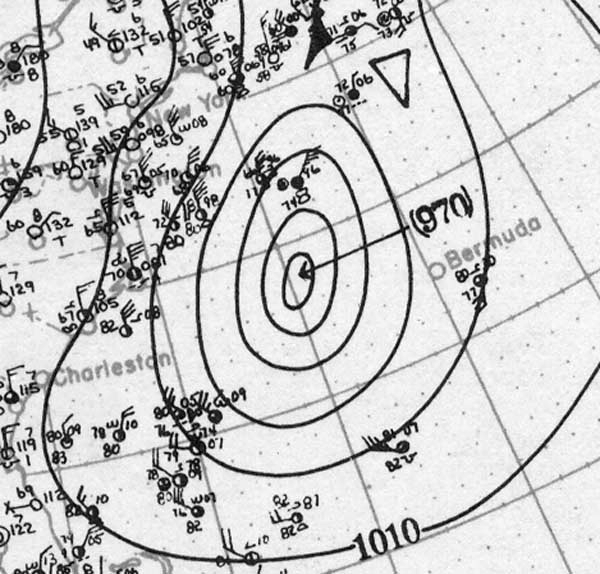
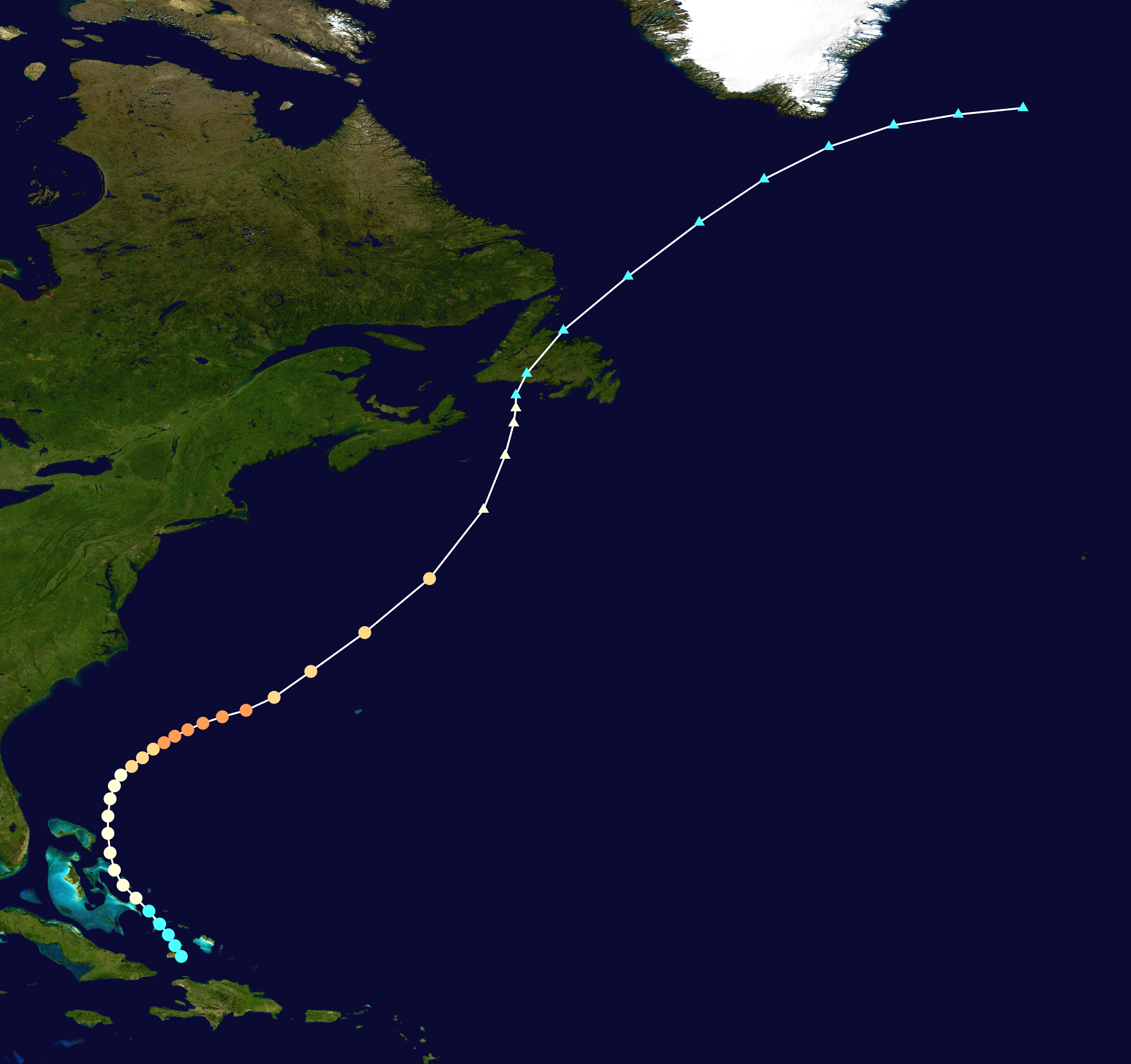
- Duration: September 24 – October 1
- Peak intensity: 120 mph (195 km/h) (1-min); <965 mbar (hPa)

Late on September 24, a tropical wave developed into a tropical storm near Great Inagua Island in the Bahamas. Moving northwestward, the storm gradually intensified and crossed Acklins early the next day. Around 00:00 UTC on September 26, the system intensified into a Category 1 hurricane near Rum Cay. Several hours later, the hurricane turned northward and passed east of the northern Bahamian islands. The cyclone curved east-northeastward early on September 28, around the time that it strengthened into a Category 2 hurricane. Reaching major hurricane intensity early on the following day, the storm peaked as a Category 3 hurricane with winds of 120 mph (195 km/h). The system began weakening by September 30, falling to Category 2 status while passing northwest of Bermuda. Thereafter, the hurricane accelerated northeastward and lost tropical characteristics, transitioning into an extratropical cyclone roughly 155 mi (250 km) south-southeast of Sable Island on October 1. The extratropical system continued northward and struck Newfoundland late on October 2, before resuming a northeastward motion and dissipating near Greenland on October 4.

In the Bahamas, a weather station in Nassau observed sustained winds of 40 mph (64 km/h). On September 30, a weather station on Bermuda recorded a sustained wind speed of 81 mph (130 km/h). The hurricane caused minor damage to the electrical and telephone plant, as well as slight impact to vessels anchored at the harbor. Additionally, several buildings "of a temporary nature" lost their roofs, according to the Montreal Gazette. The remnants of the storm brought wind gusts up to 66 mph (106 km/h) to Nova Scotia. Winds toppled trees and power, telegraph, and telephone lines throughout the province, while also leaving sporadic damage to structures. Heavy rains fell over the province, including a total of 4.1 in (100 mm) in Sydney. The resultant flooding inundated low-lying areas of the city with up to 15 ft (4.6 m) of water, submerging at least 40 homes and damaging bridges. Winds and floods caused significant damage to apple orchards, especially in Annapolis Valley. Damage in Nova Scotia alone exceeded $300,000. On Prince Edward Island, the storm damaged or destroyed 23 bridges, while winds toppled trees and knocked out communications. Winds caused mostly minor damage in Newfoundland, though rainfall washed out several roads and swept away many small bridges in the vicinity of Conception Bay. Nine deaths occurred in Newfoundland.

=== Hurricane Six ===
- Category 1 hurricane (SSHWS)
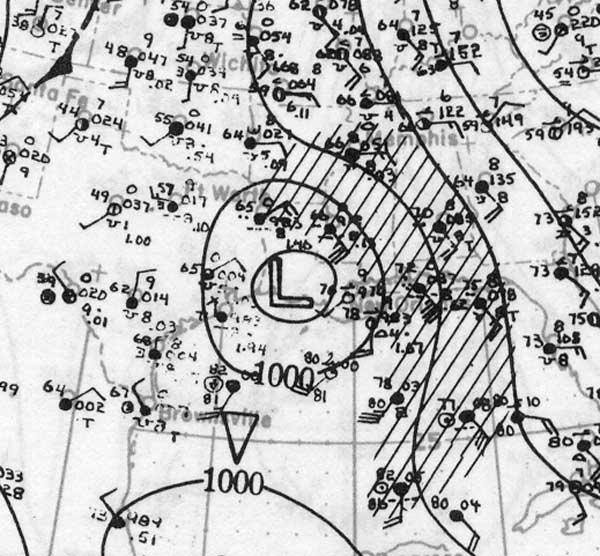
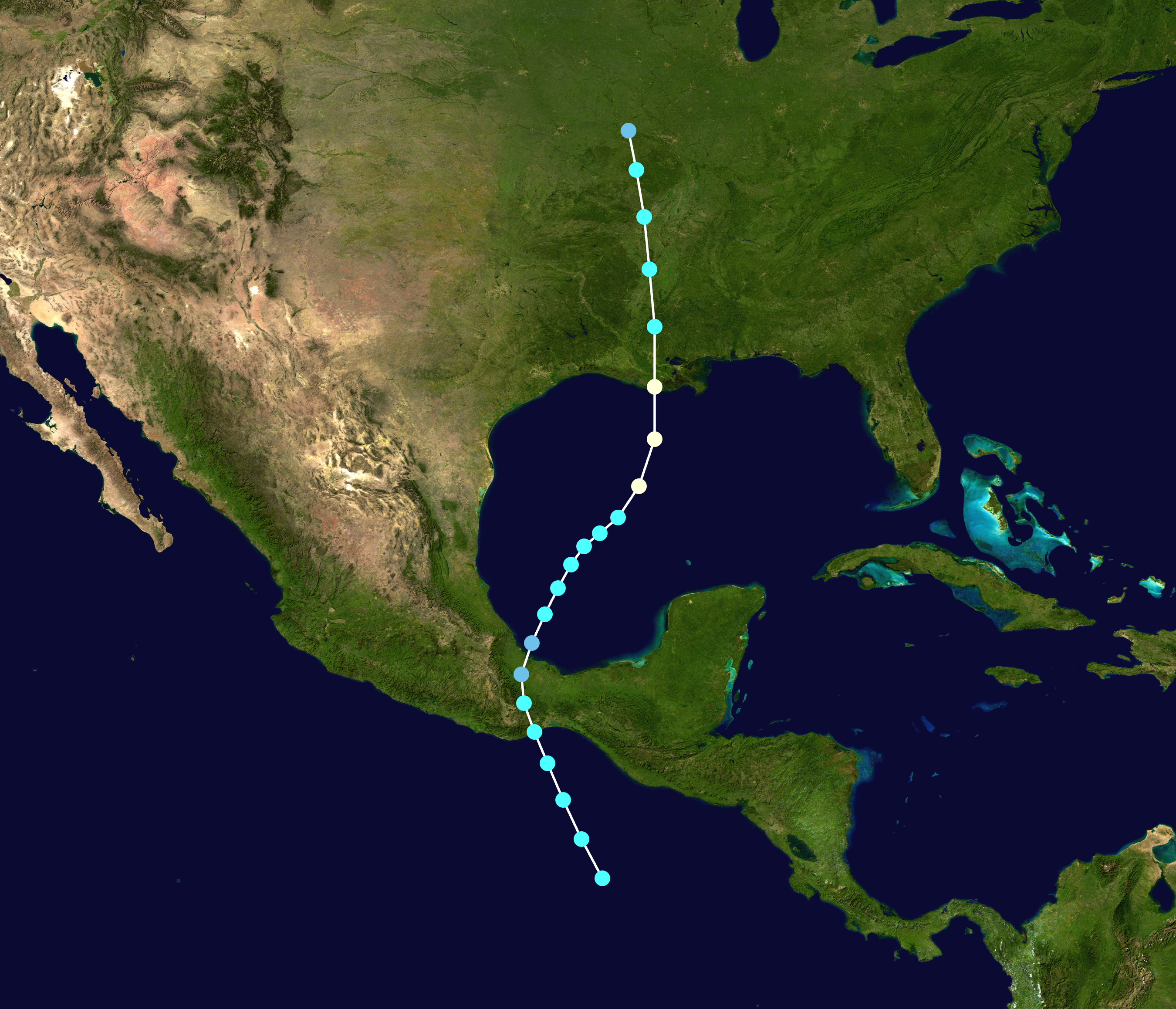
- Duration: October 12 (Entered basin) – October 17
- Peak intensity: 80 mph (130 km/h) (1-min); 983 mbar (hPa)

A tropical wave developed into a tropical storm in the eastern Pacific basin by October 12. Initially located about 340 mi (545 km) southwest of San Salvador, El Salvador, the cyclone moved north-northwestward and made landfall near Salina Cruz, Oaxaca, early on the following day. The storm quickly weakened to a tropical depression later on October 13, but remained a tropical cyclone while crossing Mexico and reached the Gulf of Mexico on October 14. At the time, it was the third tropical storm to cross from the eastern Pacific basin to the Atlantic basin; it is one of only five to have done so in recorded history. Curving northeastward, the system soon re-strengthened into a tropical storm. Late on October 15, the storm reached hurricane intensity and peaked with winds of 80 mph (130 km/h) early the next day. Around 06:00 UTC, the hurricane made landfall near Cocodrie, Louisiana, at the same intensity. The system weakened to a tropical storm about six hours later. Now moving quickly north-northwestward, the storm fell to tropical depression status on October 17 and dissipated over Missouri shortly thereafter.

The storm left little impact in Mexico. Storm surge and abnormally high tides were reported in all ports along the coast of Louisiana. Several washouts occurred along the Louisville and Nashville Railroad in New Orleans and eastward, causing a suspension of service. At Lake Pontchartrain, tides partially flooded Milneburg and Spanish Fort. Mississippi experienced the highest storm surge, which peaked at approximately 7 ft (2.1 m) above mean low tide at Gulfport. Along the coast of the state, the storm surge and tides capsized rowboats and small launches and destroyed small piers. The Mississippi and Gulf Coast Traction Company reported about $35,000 in damage to its railroads. In Alabama, an observation site in Mobile recorded wind gusts up to 60 mph (97 km/h). Storm surge and abnormally high tides inundated low-lying coastal areas of the state, with 4 ft (1.2 m) of water on the beachfront road in Bayou La Batre. Seafood factory buildings suffered minor damage. The storm generated wind gusts up to 64 mph (103 km/h) in Pensacola, Florida. There, winds downed trees, telegraph, and electrical wires, and deroofed some homes, mainly those without fastened roofs.

=== Mid-October tropical depression ===
Considered a tropical storm until reanalysis in 2009, this tropical depression formed over the southwestern Caribbean around 00:00 UTC on October 15. The depression moved northwestward for about 24 hours, before decelerating and turning to the north. By October 17, the system began moving north-northeastward and passed near the Cayman Islands on the following day. The cyclone then struck Cuba on October 19 before emerging into the Atlantic. Early on October 20, the storm turned northward while situated just east of Andros Island and passed over or near several western Bahamian islands throughout the day. The system transitioned into an extratropical cyclone by 12:00 UTC on October 21 about 290 mi (465 km) east of Daytona Beach, Florida. However, the extratropical remnants intensified, reaching sustained winds of 85 mph (140 km/h) early on October 23 – equivalent to a Category 1 hurricane. Moving north-northwestward, the extratropical low struck Virginia near the southern end of the Delmarva Peninsula later that day. After entering Canada, the system curved east-northeastward over Quebec and crossed the Gulf of Saint Lawrence and Newfoundland before re-emerging into the Atlantic on October 26. The low was last recorded to the east-southeast of the southern tip of Greenland on October 29, though historic weather maps suggest that the system may have persisted until November 2.

In Virginia, the remnants of the depression produced sustained winds up to 56 mph (90 km/h) at Cape Henry. Storm surge and abnormally high tides inundated parts of Norfolk, particularly at Willoughby Spit. Coastal flooding submerged many roads in the city, with up to 1 ft (0.30 m) of water on the streets in the business district. Significant erosion occurred between Willoughby Spilt and Cape Henry. Rough seas in Ocean City, Maryland, damaged a portion of a seawall and two cottages. Approximately 50 children at a school were sent home after a wave swept over a boardwalk adjacent to the same street as the school. Coastal flooding inundated the harbor-front section of Baltimore, with two blocks inland submerged. Heavy rainfall from the storm washed out the dirt shoulders of a newly completed state highway in Delaware. Along the coast, storm tides threatened to topple the Cape Henlopen Lighthouse. Rehoboth Beach lost significant amounts of sand, while a hotel and several cottages suffered coastal flooding damage. One person in Delaware died from exposure during the storm. In Pennsylvania, winds downed trees in and around Philadelphia, some of which blocked traffic after falling onto roads and other causing electrical outages after collapsing onto power lines.

The remnants of the depression produced strong winds in New Jersey, with a gust of 82 mph (132 km/h) in Atlantic City. The city was among the hardest hit in the state. Many trees and tree limbs, including fruit and shade trees, suffered damage or destruction throughout the city. Downed electrical wires left many power outages. Waves swept over the Atlantic City boardwalk and adjacent meadow lands. New York also experienced significant impact, especially in Brooklyn and Long Island. High winds downed numerous signs, telephone poles, and trees. A tree crashed onto a feed wire in Nassau County, leaving all of the county south of Roslyn without electricity. Heavy rainfall caused several head-on car accidents, while a pedestrian was run over and killed. The storm also capsized or wrecked many small boats and vessels and left many other watercraft missing. Waves washed away part of a portion of a seawall on Coney Island, while sections of Brooklyn experienced coastal flooding, particularly at Greenpoint. Damage in the United States totaled at least $1 million. In Canada, the extratropical cyclone dropped up to 3.4 in (86 mm) of rainfall in Ontario. Montreal in the province of Quebec observed 2.8 in (71 mm) of precipitation. The heavy rainfall flooded the Wellington Street subway station with up to 4 ft (1.2 m) of water, delaying tramcar operations. Throughout the province, floodwaters damaged or destroyed about 60 bridges.

=== Tropical Storm Seven ===
- Tropical storm (SSHWS)
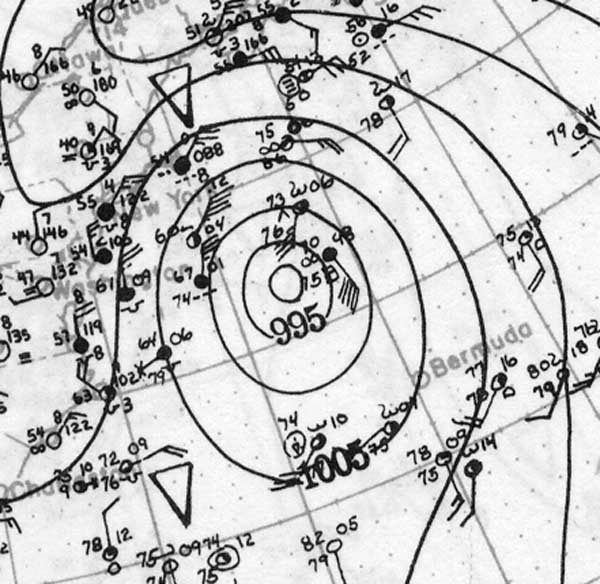
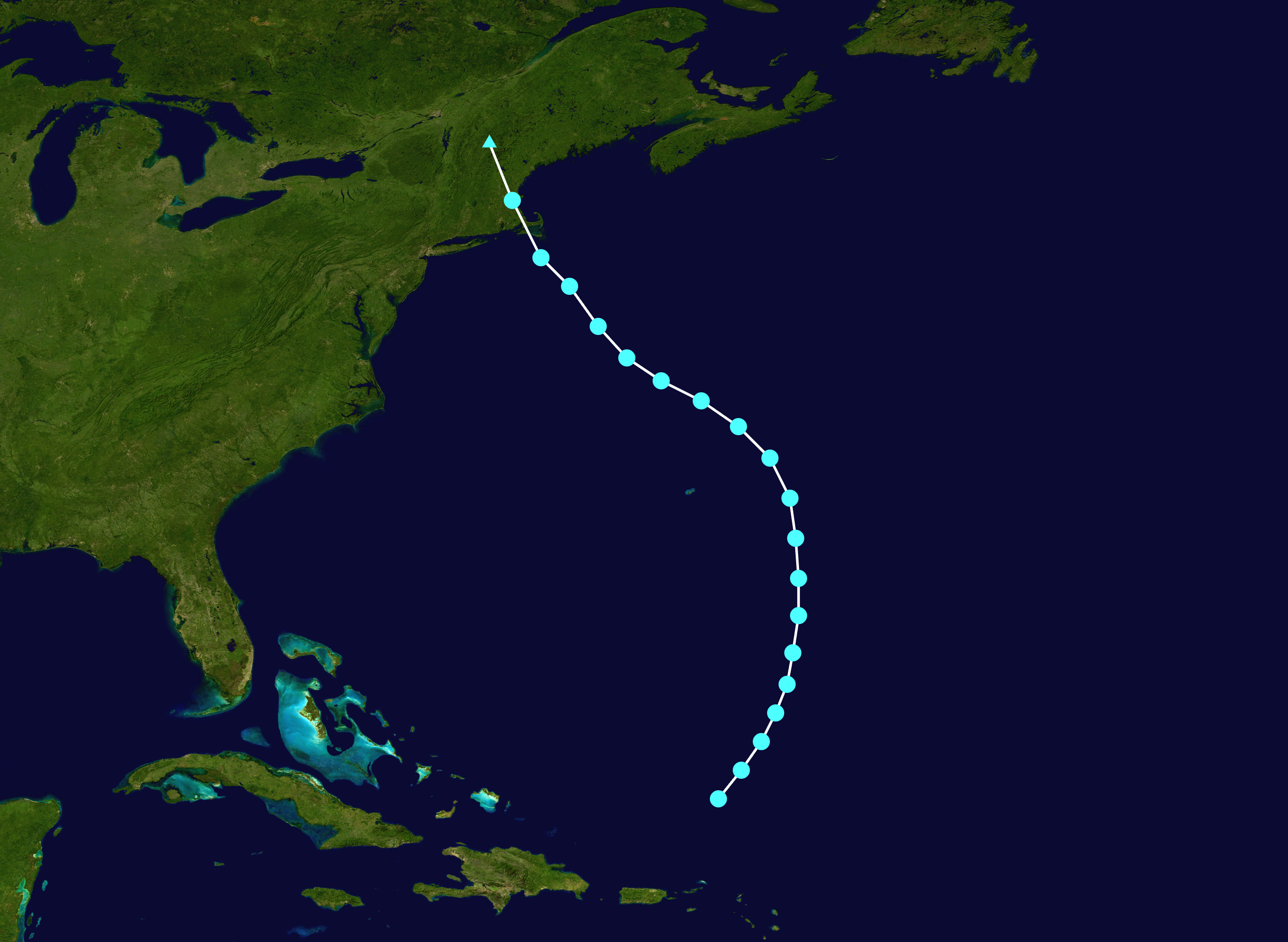
- Duration: October 15 – October 19
- Peak intensity: 65 mph (100 km/h) (1-min); <987 mbar (hPa)

Observations from ships first identified this tropical storm about 265 mi (425 km) northeast of San Juan, Puerto Rico, early on October 15. The storm initially tracked northeastward, before curving to the north on the next day. By late on October 16, the system peaked with maximum sustained winds of 65 mph (100 km/h). The cyclone turned northwestward on October 17. The storm then weakened slightly to winds of 60 mph (95 km/h) prior to making landfall on Martha's Vineyard in Massachusetts at 09:00 UTC on October 19 and then near New Bedford a few hours later. After moving inland, the system rapidly lost tropical characteristics and transitioned into an extratropical storm over Vermont late on October 19, shortly before dissipating altogether.

In Massachusetts, Nantucket observed sustained winds of 48 mph (77 km/h). Due to drought conditions, rainfall produced by the storm in Massachusetts was mostly beneficial, especially in the area around the Watuppa Ponds and Quequechan River. Precipitation in New Hampshire resulted in slippery roads, which caused some minor car accidents.

=== Tropical Storm Eight ===
- Tropical storm (SSHWS)
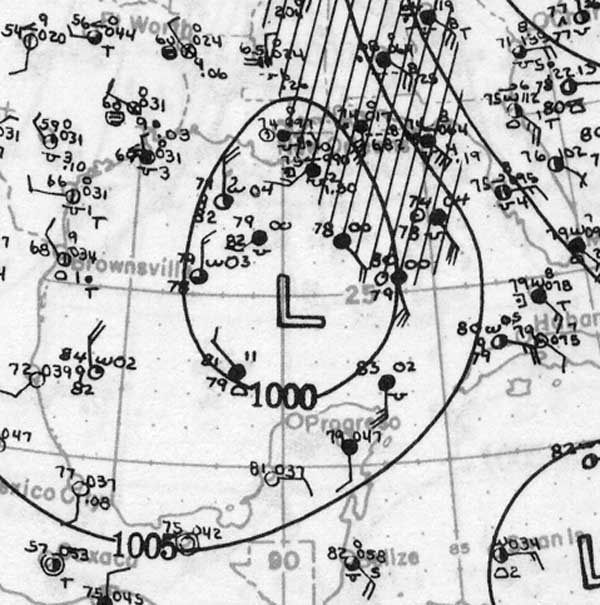
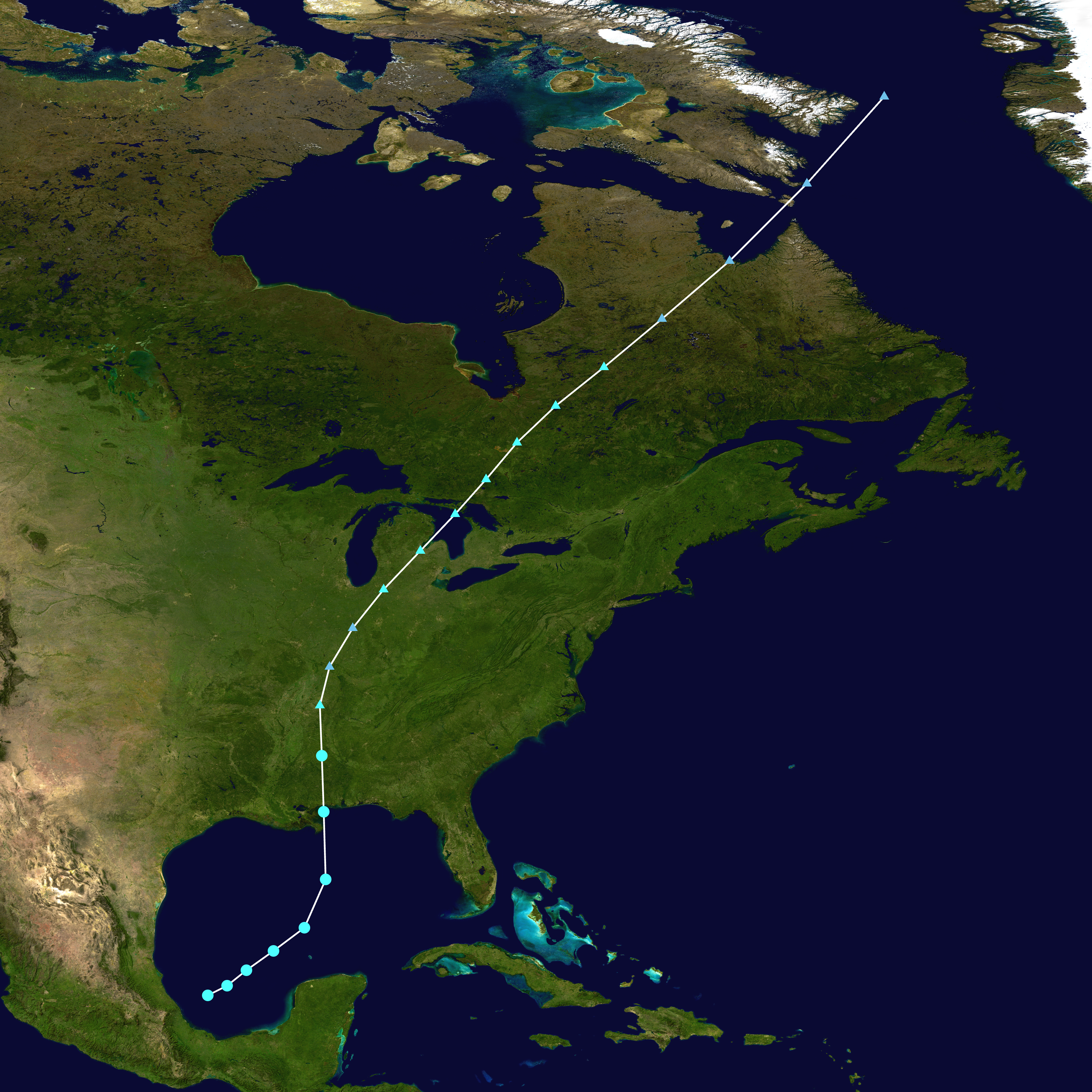
- Duration: October 16 – October 18
- Peak intensity: 60 mph (95 km/h) (1-min); 992 mbar (hPa)

A tropical storm was first observed in the Bay of Campeche around 12:00 UTC on October 16. For a brief time on October 16, there were three tropical storms active in the Atlantic simultaneously. The storm tracked northeastward and progressively moved faster throughout its duration as a tropical cyclone. Late on October 17, the system peaked with maximum sustained winds of 60 mph (95 km/h) while curving northward. Around 01:00 UTC on the following day, the storm made landfall near Mississippi City, Mississippi, at the same intensity. Although the system transitioned into an extratropical cyclone just 11 hours later over western Tennessee, the extratropical low moved northeastward across the Midwestern United States and eastern Canada; it was last noted over Baffin Bay late on October 21.

In Mexico, Salina Cruz observed sustained winds of 40 mph (64 km/h). Other locations in Mexico reported only light winds. The highest measured sustained wind speed in the United States was 56 mph (90 km/h) at Pensacola, Florida. The city also observed 6.82 in (173 mm) of precipitation in a 24-hour period. In Perdido Bay, waves smashed the schooner Bluefields into a reef, forcing the eight occupants to abandon ship and swim to shore. Four survived; the other four drowned. Rough seas in Lake Pontchartrain caused a barge to crash into a draw bridge spanning the Rigolets, shifting the bridge about 3 ft (0.91 m) from its foundation and forcing the Louisville and Nashville Railroad to suspend service between New Orleans and Gulfport, Mississippi. The storm produced heavy rains and relatively strong winds over portions of the Mississippi River Valley and Midwestern United States, with Toledo, Ohio, observing a sustained wind speed of 43 mph (69 km/h).

=== Tropical Storm Nine ===
- Tropical storm (SSHWS)
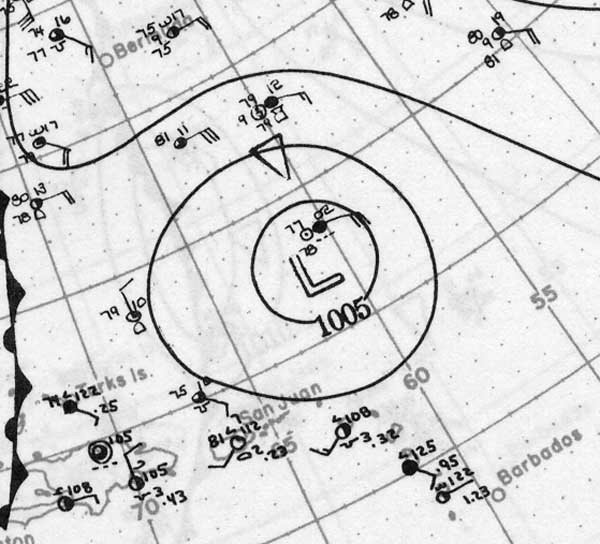
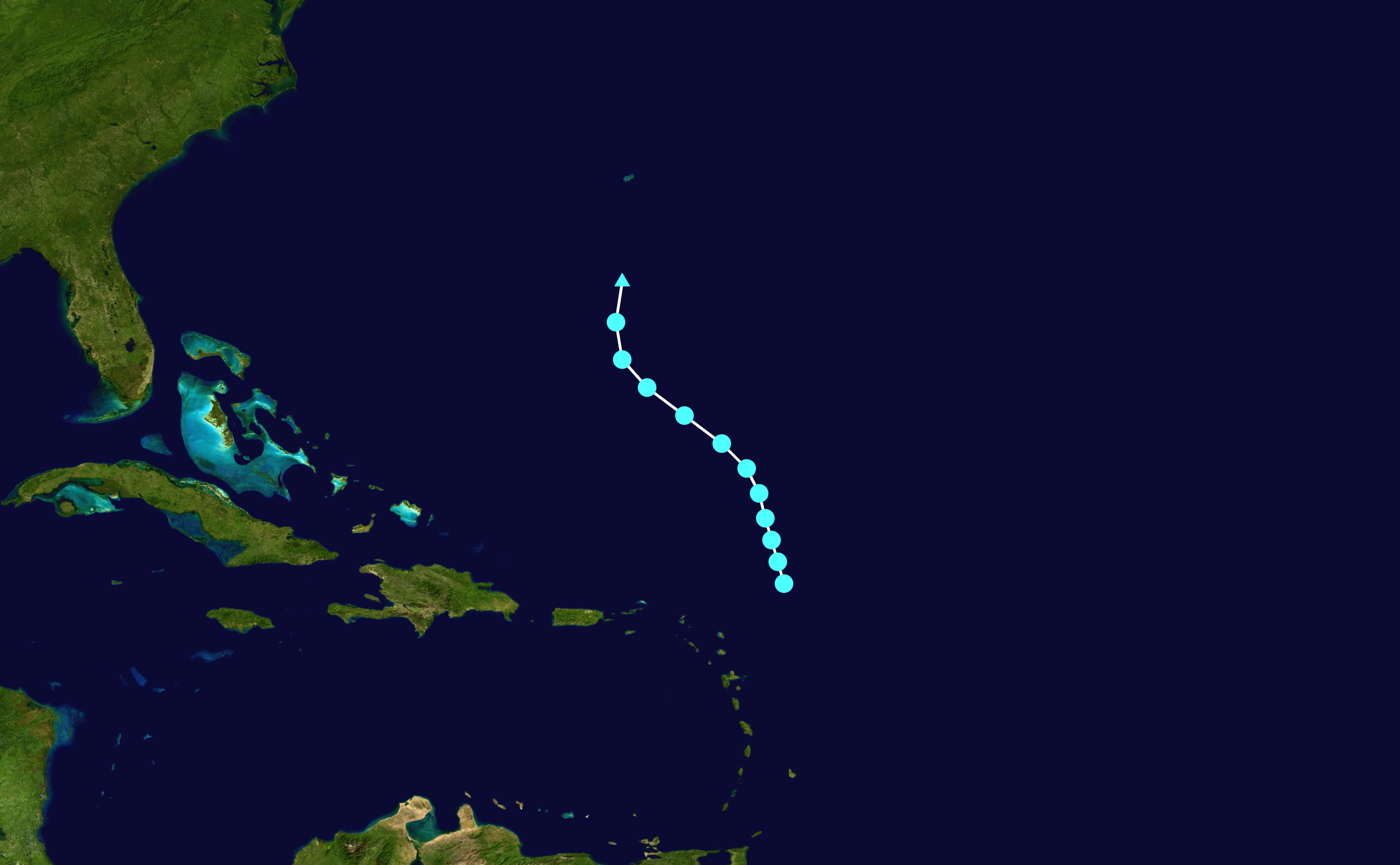
- Duration: October 24 – October 26
- Peak intensity: 45 mph (75 km/h) (1-min); <1003 mbar (hPa)

The season's final tropical cyclone was first observed by ships about 170 mi (275 km) northeast of Barbuda early on October 24. The storm initially moved slowly north-northwestward, before curving to the northwest on October 25. Early the next day, the storm peaked with maximum sustained winds of 45 mph (75 km/h). The cyclone then curved northward late on October 26 and transitioned into an extratropical cyclone approximately 220 mi (355 km) south of Bermuda.

=== Other system ===
On June 19, a weak tropical depression formed from the tail end of a dying cold front, north of western Bahamas and east of Florida. The tropical depression moved generally north after its formation. Failing to intensify further, it was absorbed by a stronger cold front sweeping down the East Coast of the United States on June 22.

== See also ==
- 1900–1940 South Pacific cyclone seasons
- 1900–1950 South-West Indian Ocean cyclone seasons
- 1920s Australian region cyclone seasons
