= Perdido Pass =

Navigation channel in Alabama

Coordinates: 30.275°N 87.555°W

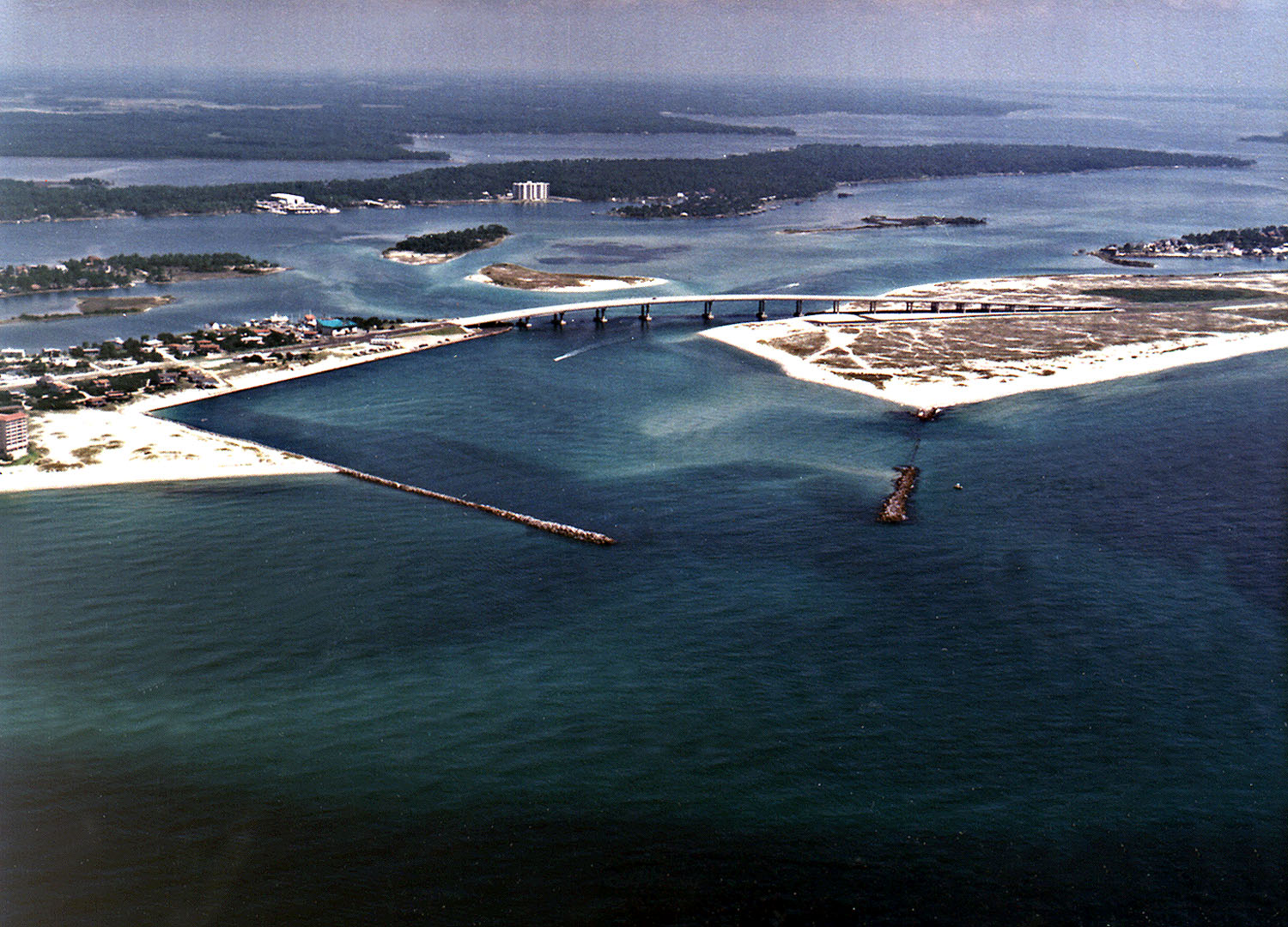
Perdido Bay and Perdido Pass, with bridge connecting Alabama Point (left) with Florida Point (right). The rock barriers, extending down from the beaches are the west jetty & east jetty.

Location of Perdido Pass in Alabama

Perdido Pass, separating Alabama Point from Florida Point, is the mouth of the Perdido River. Perdido Pass forms a water passage that connects Perdido Bay with the Gulf of Mexico to the south, in the U.S. state of Alabama, 2 miles (3 km) west of the Alabama/Florida state line. A bridge spans Perdido Pass, connecting Alabama Point (western side) with Florida Point in Alabama (linked below). At the entrance into the Gulf, the 2 rock barriers, extending from the white beaches, are the west jetty & east jetty (see image). The surrounding area is heavily developed, with high-rise condominiums. However, there are nearby beach-front parks, with Gulf State Park on the eastern side of Perdido Pass.

== Description ==
Perdido Pass, extending between Florida Point and Alabama Point, is easily distinguished, from offshore, by the Alabama State Route 182 highway bridge in Orange Beach, Alabama, spanning the pass with two openings. The fixed span over Perdido Pass Channel has a clearance of 54 feet (16 m). The fixed span over Cotton Bayou Channel has a clearance of 41 feet (12 m). The dredged entrance channel leads from the Gulf through Perdido Pass to a fork at the highway bridge; thence into two channels, one leading north into Terry Cove and Johnson Cove and the other leading east into Bayou St. John. The entrance to the pass is protected by a jetty on the west and by a combination weir and jetty on the east; the top of the weir is submerged 6 inches (15 cm) at mean low tide. Numerous sunken wrecks are in the approach to the pass.

== History ==
The Perdid Pass was about 2 miles (3.2 km) east of its present location until early in the 20th century. The barrier spit on the western (Alabama) side of the inlet, Point Ornocor, overlapped what is now Perdido Key, extending for several miles parallel to and on the north side of Perdido Key. As a result, the water passage from Perdido Pass to Perdido Bay was long, narrow and winding, passing between Perdido Key and Point Orconor, doubling the end of the point and then passing back between the point and the Florida shore on the north side. In early 1906, local residents dug a new inlet through Point Ornocor about 2 miles (3.2 km) west of the old inlet. The new inlet was widened by the 1906 Mississippi hurricane. The old inlet then silted up and closed, with the result that the portion of Point Ornocor east of the new inlet was attached to Perdido Key and the Florida mainland. The original waterway from the old Perdido Pass to Perdido Bay became known as Old River. A passage later opened from the western end of Old River to the Bayou St. John near the new Perdido Pass, separating what is now Ono Island from Perdido Key. The spit ending on the west side of Perdido Pass is now known as Alabama Point. Alabama and Florida settled the location of the state line in 1953, placing it at the location of the old Perdido Pass. Perdido Pass has historically moved westward due to longshore drift. The westward flowing longshore current accretes sand on the up-current (eastern) side of the pass and erodes sand from the down-current (western) side.

== Depth of channels ==
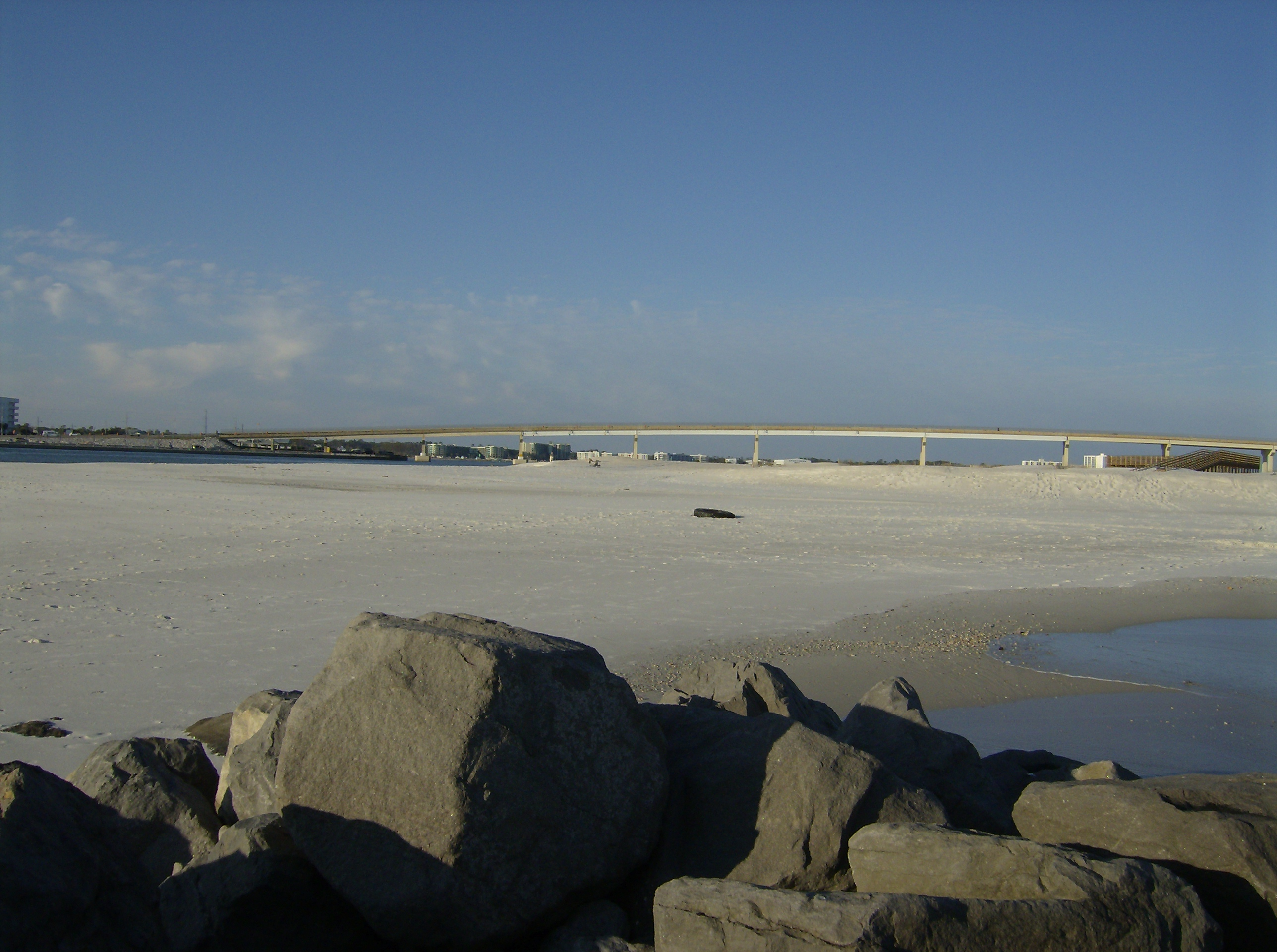
Perdido Pass viewed from the east jetty

In October 2006, the controlling depth was 5.2 feet (1.6 m), reaching 8.2 ft (2.5 m) at mid-channel, in the entrance channel to the intersection of the east and west channels. From that area, thence 4.9 ft (1.5 m), reaching 8.3 ft deep (2.5 m) at mid-channel, in the west channel leading to Terry and Johnson Coves, thence 6.9 ft (2.1 m), reaching 7.4 ft deep (2.3 m) at mid-channel, in the east channel leading to Bayou St. John. The channels are well marked. A lighted whistle buoy off the entrance marks the approach.

== Access to the Intracoastal Waterway ==
The Intracoastal Waterway, in the lower part of Perdido Bay, is reached from Perdido Pass via a marked channel through Bayou St. John. In May 1982, shoaling to 6 feet (1.8 m) was reported in Bayou St. John, between day-beacons no. 6 and 8. An overhead power cable, with a clearance of 59 ft (18 m), crosses the channel leading to Terry Cove and Johnson Cove, about 0.4 miles (0.64 km) from the State Route 182 fixed bridge. Several small-craft facilities are in the coves and Cotton Bayou, on the W side of Perdido Pass 0.7 miles (1.1 km) above the entrance.

== Old River ==
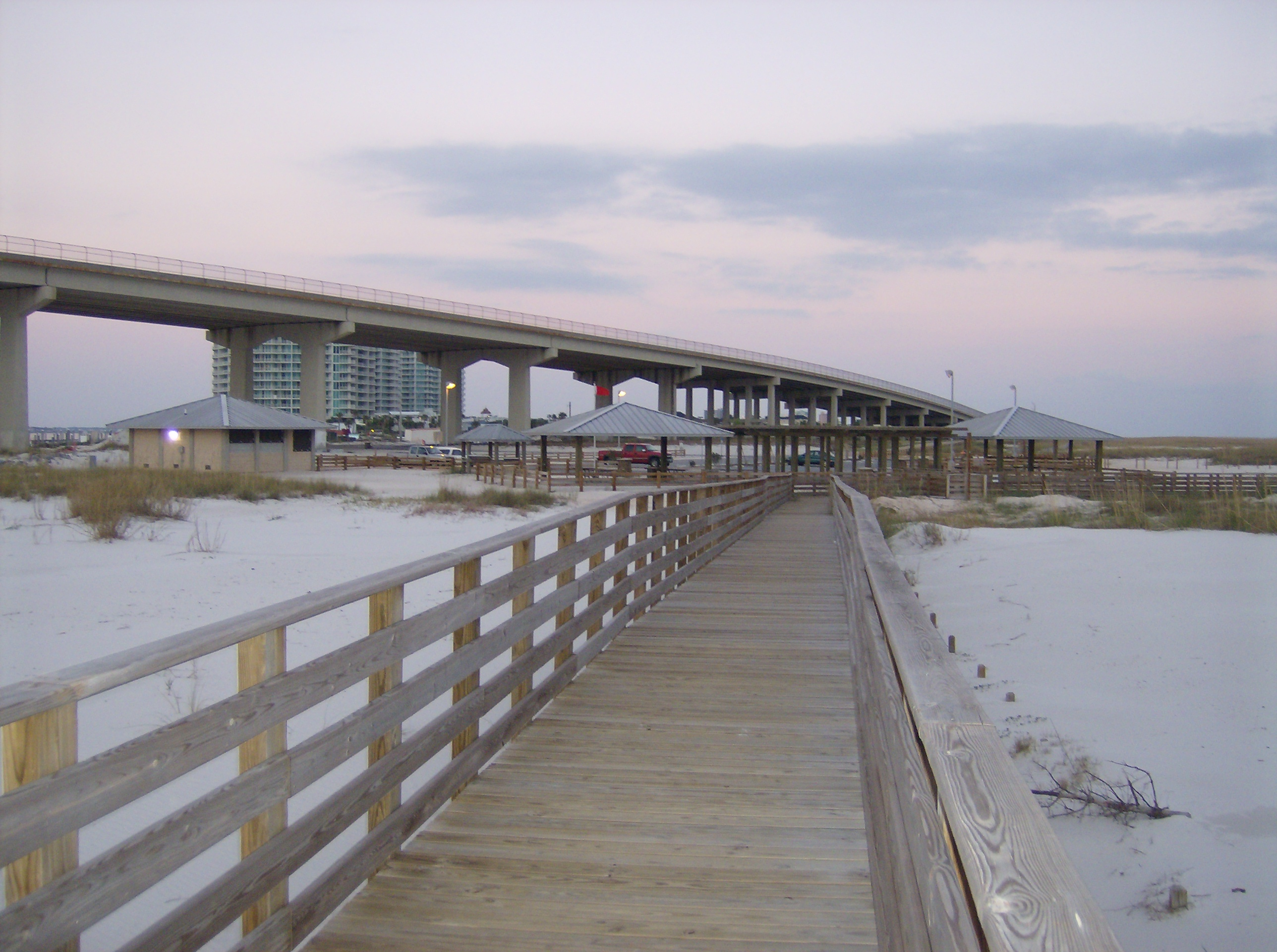
Gulf State Park at Perdido Pass, on Florida Point (view facing west).

Location of Perdido Pass in USA

Old River enters Perdido Pass from the east between Florida Point and Ono Island. In May 1982, a reported depth of 5 feet (1.5 m) could be carried through the river, with local knowledge. The Florida-Alabama state boundary passes along the center of Old River until 2 miles (3 km) before Perdido Pass. A fixed highway bridge with a clearance of 24 feet (7.3 m) crosses Old River, about 1 mile (1.6 km) east of Perdido Pass.

== Florida Point in Alabama ==
Both Alabama Point and Florida Point are in the town of Orange Beach, Alabama (along the Gulf of Mexico). However, Florida Point is the tip of a peninsula originating in the U.S. State of Florida, with the final 2 miles (3 km) of the tip contained within Alabama. Often, U.S. state lines run through the middle of a water pass or river; however, Perdido Pass is entirely within the State of Alabama, and the state line runs east of it. The Gulf State Park is located on Florida Point. Historically, new passes are breached and old ones filled in during hurricanes. The original pass discovered by Juan Carlos Siquenza (sp?)was located on the current state boundary between Alabama, and Florida. The use of stone and cement jetties combined with dredging and pumping sand out of the pass by the Army Corps of Engineers and the City of Orange Beach currently mitigates damage from hurricanes and sedimentation.

== Islands of Perdido Pass ==
Also known as the Orange Beach Islands, the Islands of Perdido Pass are considered both recreational hangouts for boaters, and vital sanctuaries to several species of plant and animal. The islands of Orange Beach, Alabama are accessible only by watercraft. Two public boat accesses are offered in Orange Beach, as well as boat launches including The Wharf or Bear Point Marina.

The Islands of Perdido Pass consist of Bird Island, Robinson Island, Gilchrist Island, Walker Island, and the easternmost Rabbit Island.

== 2010 Deepwater Horizon oil spill ==
Following the 2010 Deepwater Horizon oil spill the entrance to Perdido Pass was closed, with a barrier system in June 2010, to control tidal flow of oil entering from the Gulf of Mexico. The daily high tide was causing oil-contaminated water to enter Perdido Bay. The barrier system was designed to allow boats to travel through Perdido Pass, during the outflowing tide, but close during the rising tide and collect oil deposits in a retention area on the eastern edge of the pass. During the disaster BP took over much of the Gulf State Park and used it for parking or storage of equipment. As of April 2011, BP or BP subcontractors were still utilizing the park free of charge.

East of Mobile Bay the damage to the fragile environment from BP oil spill clean-up crews exceeded damage done by the oil spill itself.

== Sources ==
- Mullen, John (August 27, 2020). "Perdido Pass - Orange Beach's best known landmark". Orange Beach News.
- Schupp, Courtney A. (August 2019). Gulf Islands National Seashore Geologic Resources Inventory Report (PDF). National Park Service (Report).
- "Perdido Pass Historical Marker". www.hmdb.org. May 25, 2019.
