= Ono Island =

Ono Island may refer to:

- Ono Island (Fiji), an island in the Kadavu Group, Fiji
- Ono Island (Alabama), a barrier island in Baldwin County, Alabama, United States
