= Uh Oh =

Uh Oh or variants may refer to:

== Books ==
- Uh-Oh: Some Observations from Both Sides of the Refrigerator Door, a book by Robert Fulghum
- Uh! Oh! (children's book series), a children's book series about Jewish holidays

== Television ==
- Uh Oh! (game show), a Canadian children's show
- "Vacation" or "the 'uh-oh' episode", an episode of the TV series Sealab 2021

== Brands ==
- Uh-Oh! Oreo, a type of Oreo cookie

== Music ==
=== Albums ===
- Uh-Oh (Cowboy Mouth album), or the title song, 2003
- Uh-Oh (David Byrne album), 1992
- Uh Oh (Patrick Watson album), 2025
- Uh Oh… No Breaks!, an album by The Slickee Boys, 1985

=== Songs ===
- "Uh-Oh" (song), by (G)I-dle
- "Uh-Ohhh!", a song by Ja Rule featuring Lil Wayne
- "Falling in Love (Uh-Oh)", a song by Miami Sound Machine featuring Gloria Estefan (1986)
- "Kiss My (Uh-Oh)", a song by Anne-Marie and Little Mix
- "Mama Do (Uh Oh, Uh Oh)", a song by Pixie Lott
- "Never Leave You (Uh Oooh, Uh Oooh)", a song by Lumidee
- "Uh Oh", song by Kelly Osbourne from her 2005 album Sleeping in the Nothing
- "Uh Oh", song by Taken by Cars
- "Uh Oh", song by TQ
- "Uh Oh" (Chinese and English version), song by Chloe Bennet
- "Uh Oh", a song by Puddle of Mudd from their 2019 album Welcome to Galvania
- "Here We Go (Uh Oh)", a song by Coco Jones from her 2025 album Why Not More?

== See also ==
- Oh No (disambiguation)
