= Ono (surname) =

Ono (小野) and Ōno/Oono/Ohno (大野) are Japanese surnames. Ono means "small field" and Ōno means "large field". Both are used as Japanese surnames. Everyone in the list below (of people with these surnames) was born in Japan, unless otherwise noted.

== Ono/Ōno ==
- Allen K. Ono (1933–2016), U.S. Army officer, first lieutenant general of Japanese-American descent, born in Hawaii
- Ono no Azumabito (d. 757), Japanese court official during the Nara period, governor of Bizen province
- Ōno no Azumabito (d. 742), official, during the same period, who held the Imperial position of Chinjufu-shōgun
- Ohno no Mataka (782–843) aristocrat and government official
- Chizu Ono, photographer
- Daisuke Ono (born 1978), voice actor
- Frank H. Ono, Japanese-American soldier
- Fuyumi Ono, author
- Ono Genmyo, Japanese scholar of Buddhism and Buddhist art
- Ōno Harunaga, general under Toyotomi Hideyori
- Hitoshi Ono, rugby player
- Isao Ono (小野 悳; born 1933), Japanese ice hockey player
- Jiro Ono (born 1925), chef of Sukiyabashi Jiro, three-Michelin-starred Japanese restaurant
- Jiro Ono (politician) (born 1953), Japanese politician
- Kaoru Ōno (born 1941), author
- Kaoru Ono (mathematician) (born 1962), geometer
- Katsuo Ōno, Japanese composer
- Kazushi Ono, orchestra and opera conductor
- Ken Ono, Japanese-American mathematician
- Kenshō Ono, voice actor
- Koichi Ono (小野 光一; 1919–2000), Japanese golfer
- Kōsei Ono, rugby player
- Ōno Kurobei, chief retainer of the Banshū Akō Domain
- Lisa Ono, Japanese-Brazilian bossa nova singer
- Machiko Ono, actress
- Marina Ōno, voice actress
- Masahito Ono (小野 雅史; born 1996), Japanese footballer
- Masanosuke Ono, wrestler
- Masatoshi Ono, rock/heavy metal singer
- Masatsugu Ono (小野 正嗣; born 1970), Japanese writer
- Minoru Ōno, the real name of Saburō Kitajima, Enka singer
- Misao Ono (小野 操; 1908–?), Japanese high jumper
- Miyuki Ono (小野 みゆき; born 1959), Japanese actress
- Motohiro Ōno (大野 元裕; born 1963), Japanese politician
- Ryōko Ono, voice actress
- Ryuji Ono (大野 龍二; born 1985), Japanese long-distance runner
- Ryumo Ono, Japanese basketball player
- Santa J. Ono (born 1962), a Japanese-American biologist, university administrator and board member
- Satomi Ono (尾野 聡美; born 1975), Japanese ice hockey player
- Shinji Ono, footballer
- Shinjiro Ono, former deputy commissioner of the Japan Patent Office
- Shoko Ono (born 1981), Japanese ice hockey player
- Shunzo Ono, footballer
- Susumu Ōno, linguist
- Takashi Ono (born 1931), Japanese gymnast and Olympic medalist
- Takashi Ono (judoka) (born 1980), Japanese martial arts practitioner
- Takashi Ono (mathematician) (1928–2026), Japanese-American mathematician
- Toshihiro Ono, manga artist
- Yoko Ono (小野 洋子; born 1933), musician, artist, feminist and peace activist who married John Lennon
- Yoko Ono (judoka) (大野 陽子; born 1989), Japanese judoka
- Yoshinori Ono (game producer), Japanese video game producer
- Yūdai Ōno (大野 雄大; born 1988), Japanese professional baseball player
- Yuji Ono (footballer) (born 1992), Japanese footballer
- Yūki Ōno, wrestler
- Yūki Ono, voice actor
- Yusaku Ono (小野 祐策; born 1947), Japanese weightlifter

== Ohno ==
- Apolo Ohno, American speed-skater
- Hideo Ohno, Japanese physicist
- Kassius Ohno, ring name of American pro-wrestler Chris Spradlin (a.k.a. Chris Hero)
- Kazuo Ohno, Japanese butoh dancer and choreographer
- Kiyofumi Ohno, male Japanese pop singer/songwriter
- Mikiyo Ohno, female Japanese pop singer
- Mitsugi Ohno, Japanese-American glassblower
- Mitsuki Ono, Japanese snowboarder
- Saori Sarina Ohno, Japanese pianist raised in Germany
- Satoshi Ohno member of the Japanese idol group Arashi
- Shinobu Ohno, Japanese footballer
- Susumu Ohno, American geneticist
- Taiichi Ohno, Toyota executive
- Yoshinori Ohno, Japanese politician
- Yuji Ohno, Japanese jazz musician
- Yukari Ohno (大野 ゆかり; born 1975), Japanese ice hockey player

== Other people ==
- Barry Ono, stage name of Frederick Valentine Harrison, British variety theatre performer and collector of penny dreadfuls

== See also ==
- Ohno, the name of an orbot from the animated series Mighty Orbots
- Oh No (disambiguation)
