= Oh no =

Oh no may refer to:

- An exclamation used to indicate shock or dismay, primarily used in the English language

== Music ==
- Oh No (musician) (born 1979), American rapper

=== Albums ===
- Oh No!, 2004 album by Crackout
- Oh No (OK Go album), 2005
- Oh No (Jessy Lanza album), 2016
- Oh No (Xiu Xiu album), 2021

=== Songs ===
- "Oh No" (Bring Me the Horizon song), 2015
- "Oh No" (Bro'Sis song), 2003
- "Oh No" (Commodores song), 1981
- "Oh No!" (Marina and the Diamonds song), 2010
- "Oh No" (Mos Def and Pharoahe Monch song), 2000
- "Oh No", by Frank Zappa from You Can't Do That on Stage Anymore, Vol. 1 1988 and Weasels Ripped My Flesh, 1970
- "Oh No", by Noreaga from Melvin Flynt – Da Hustler, 1999
- "Oh No", from the compilation album Lyricist Lounge 2, 2000
- "Oh No", by Snoop Dogg featuring 50 Cent from R&G (Rhythm & Gangsta): The Masterpiece, 2004
- "Oh No!", by All Time Low from Everyone's Talking!
- "Oh No", by Andrew Bird from Noble Beast, 2009
- "Oh No", by Steam Powered Giraffe from The Vice Quadrant: A Space Opera, 2015
- "Oh No (I'll Never Fall in Love Again)", by Selena, originally intended for the album Dreaming of You, 2015
- "Oh No (Sentimental Things)", by So Solid Crew from They Don't Know, 2001
- "Oh No", by Daniel Johnston from Retired Boxer, 1985
- "Oh No!", by Röyksopp from The Inevitable End, 2014
- "Oh No", a popular TikTok motif from the song "Remember (Walking on the Sand)" by the Shangri-Las, sampled and remixed by Capone & Kreepa
- "Oh No!!!", by grandson (musician) from "a modern tragedy vol. 3", 2019
- "Oh No!", by The Decemberists from As It Ever Was, So It Will Be Again, 2024
- "Oh No", by Wet Leg from Wet Leg, 2022

== Other ==
- Oh No!, a PlayStation game
- "oh no", the punchline of Webcomic Name strips by Alex Norris

== See also ==
- Uh Oh (disambiguation)
- Ohno (disambiguation)
- Ono (disambiguation)
