= Uh! Oh! (children's book series) =

Jewish children's book series

Uh! Oh! is an Israeli series of children's picture books about Jewish festivals published by Simcha Media Group (Hebrew) and Yellow Brick Road Publishers Inc (English). On each page, readers search for four items (and for the bonus "Uh! Oh!" speech bubble) that provide information about each festival. The books contain facts, songs, and religious texts (such as a haggadah for the Pesach (Passover) version), as well as games, comics and drawings. The series is written and illustrated by various authors.

Pitspopany Press published an entire line of "UH! OH!" Holiday titles that "not only presented the basics of each Jewish holiday on a simple, easy-to-understand level, but also asked the reader to find the Holiday symbol within the busy full color spreads that appeared throughout the book". These books which follows the same themes as the classic "Where’s Waldo" titles were published with the intention of publish books to cater for the diverse elements of the Jewish market. This series has been reprinted many times, as well as its subsequent soft cover incarnation called "The Energizing Series".

If you find all the Uh! Oh! characters and the 4 hidden objects within one hour, then one qualifies as "Uh! Oh! Tester".

== Reception ==
The Jewish Agency for Israel describe the books as "a wonderful activity for children and a good starting point for discussing holiday themes."

"Uh! Oh! Jewish Holidays" has been described on JBooks.com as being "[an] interactive haggadah [which] entertains children as they search for characters cleverly interspersed in Zwebner's lively illustrations. The language of the haggadah has been simplified to highlight the important elements of the seder for younger participants."

"The Jewish Family Fun Book" says of "Uh! Oh! Haggadah'": "interspersed among the pages of this haggadah are seek-and-find illustrations that will both teach children about the holiday (by depicting scenes from the Passover story) but keep kids busy during long stretches of the seder"

"Teaching Jewish Holidays: History, Values, and Activities" describes Uh! Oh! Hanukkah as being "based on the format of the Where's Waldo books, Uh! Oh! is an entertaining text." The book says that the Uh! Oh! title is suitable for anyone from K and up.

== Books ==
- Uh! Oh! Hanukkah (1993) (ISBN 0943706157)
  - The Energizing Hanukkah Story for Children (a revised, expanded edition of Uh! Oh! Hanukkah)
- Uh! Oh! Passover (full title: Uh! Oh! Haggadah: With Hidden Objects You'll (Almost) Never Find) (1994, Janet Zwebner) (ISBN 9654650037)
- Uh! Oh! Festivals (10 different festivals included Rosh Hashanah, Hanukkah, Sukkot, Purim, Passover etc.)
- Uh! Oh! Jewish Holidays) (1993, Gedalia Peterseil) (ISBN 0943706149)
  - The Energizing Jewish Holidays for Children (revised second edition of "Uh! Oh! Jewish Holidays", 1999)
