= Ohno no Mataka =

Japanese aristocrat and government official (782–843)

Ohno no Mataka (Japanese: 大野真鷹, Hepburn: Ōno no Mataka; 782 – 7 March 843) was a Japanese aristocrat and government official of the early Heian period. He was the son of Ohno no Nao.

Ohno no Mataka served at a high rank at court for a long time during the early Heian period.

== Bibliography ==
- Tei Morita Shokunihonkoki (Last volume) Kodansha, 2010
