= Barry Ono =

British variety theatre performer (1876–1941)

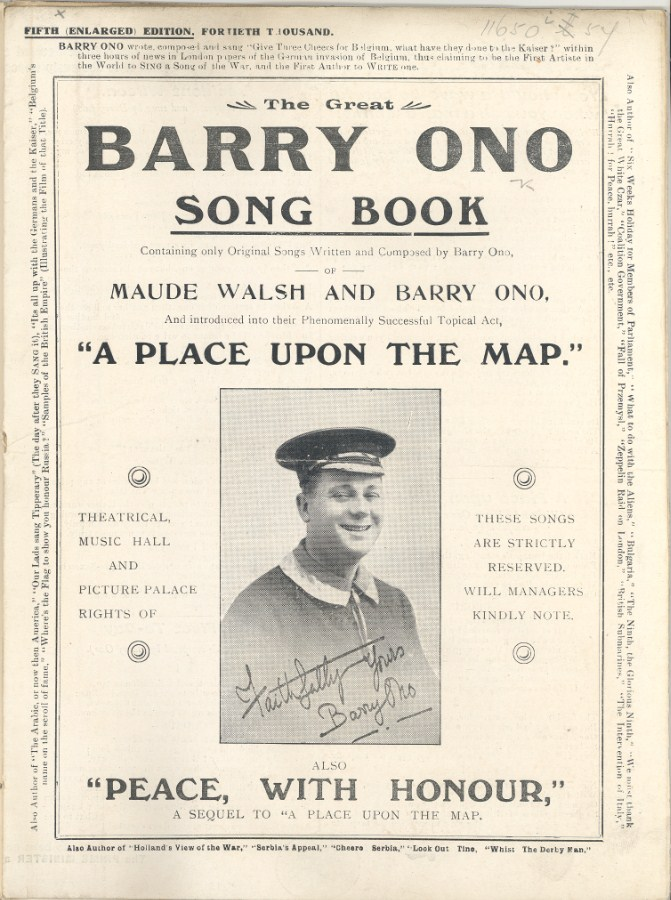
Photograph of Ono in 1916 Songbook

Barry Ono (1876–1941) was a British variety theatre performer, collector of penny dreadfuls and benefactor of the British Library. His collection of songbooks was bequeathed to the British Library in 1941.

== Life ==
Barry Ono was the stage name of Frederick Valentine Harrison. Ono was born in Chelsea, London on 21 May 1876. Though he struggled early in his career as a comedian and comedic songwriter, he gained some notoriety and experienced a career peak in 1929. Several of his songs were published in collections such as The Great Barry Ono Song Book. He was especially known for a one-man routine called "The Old Time Music Hall." In this 12-minute routine, Ono would do impressions of former singers performing their favorite songs. Ono began withdrawing from the stage in 1930; it has been speculated that this was connected to the death of Maude Walsh, who shared the stage with him in 1927. In 1932, Ono married Dorinda Hill (the stage name of Dorothy Hiscox) and, though their wedding certificate records that Ono was a widower, no records of any previous marriages have been found.

Ono was an avid collector penny fiction and at the age of twelve conducted a lending library from his home in which, for an initial fee of six pence plus a penny-a-week subscription, boys could borrow from his own collection.

== Sources ==
- James, Elizabeth; Smith, Helen R; Library, British (1998), Penny dreadfuls and boys' adventures : the Barry Ono Collection of Victorian popular literature in the British Library, British Library, ISBN 978-0-7123-4528-6
