= Ono Island, Alabama =

Unincorporated community in Alabama, United States

Ono Island
- Community
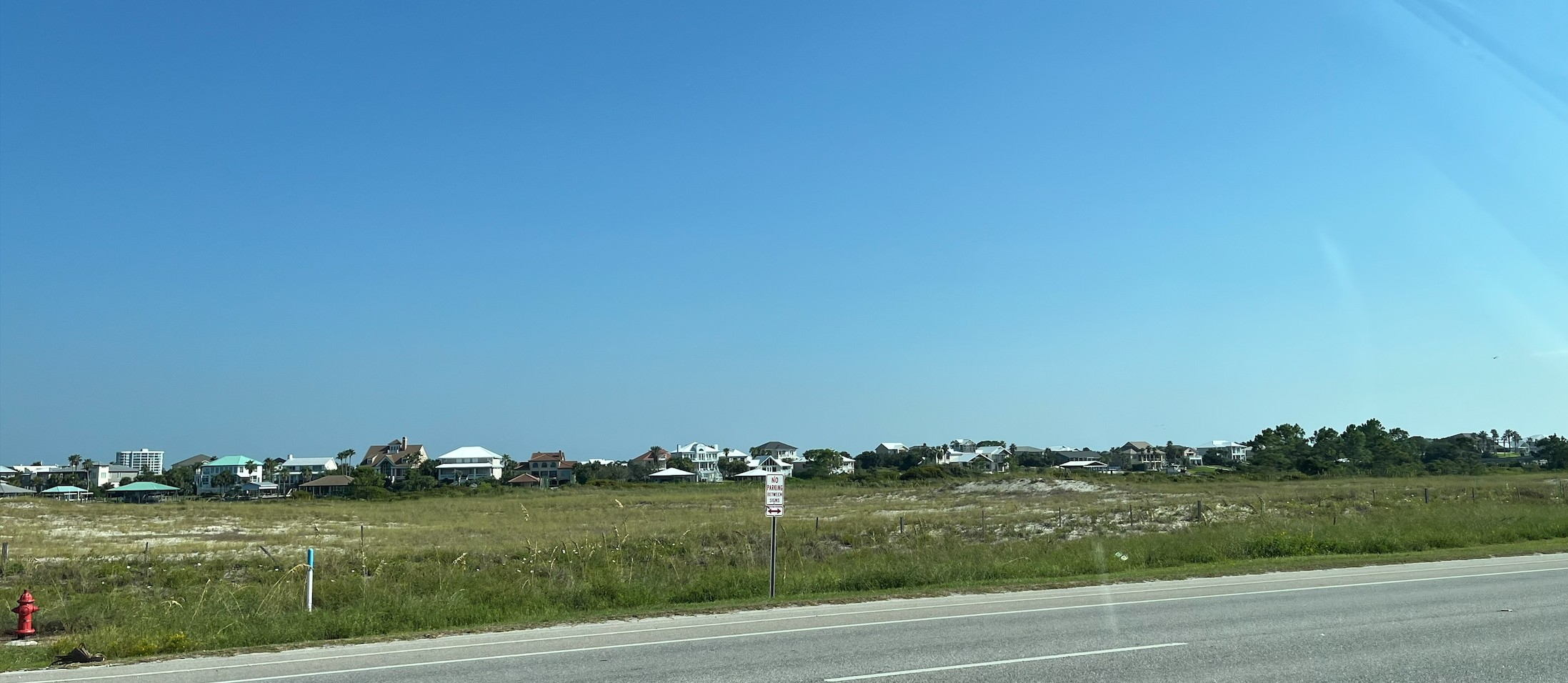
- Ono Island from Alabama State Route 182

- Location in Alabama.
- Coordinates: 30°17′15″N 87°30′7″W
- Country: United States
- State: Alabama
- County: Baldwin
- Time zone: UTC-6 (Central (CST))
  - Summer (DST): UTC-5 (CDT)
- Area code: 251
- Website: http://www.onoislandpoa.com

Ono Island is a 5.5-mile (8.9 km) long barrier island located in southern Baldwin County, Alabama, United States, at the mouth of Perdido Bay near the Gulf of Mexico. It is bordered by Bayou St. John to the north and Old River to the south. Surrounding communities include Perdido Key, Florida to the south and east and Orange Beach, Alabama to the south and west.

The island is home to a single community which is not within the corporate limits of any municipality. It's both private and gated. Although not within any municipality the island is subject to governance by the Baldwin County Commission. Emergency services are provided by nearby communities. The island is accessed via a private, guarded, bridge from State Route 182.

== History ==
Ono Island was along the boundary of the treaties between France and Spain. In 1813, after protests and attempts at rebellion, President James Monroe seized Spanish lands west of the Perdido River and declared them a part of the Louisiana Purchase of 1803. This set the east end of the Island, Perdido Key, at the mouth of the Perdido River, as the boundary between the United States and Spain. That same boundary would later mark the boundary between Alabama and Florida. Ono Island has previously been known as "Goat Island" or "George Kee's Island". George Kee, a caretaker for land belonging to Fred Scott. Scott was an early developer in the Perdido Key area and acquired Ono Island (alongside Innerarity point and other land) via Spanish land grants in the 1820s. Scott brought in goats and allowed them to roam free until there were an estimated 2,000 goats on the island, plus the wild hogs that Kee allowed anyone to shoot for food. At that time, the island was uninhabited except a small house Kee occupied that he built himself. A hurricane in 1916 changed the topography of the island by closing the Key and creating a new opening on the western end of the island. When Florida attempted to claim the land between the old pass and the new, Alabama legislators replied "Oh no you don't." That gave rise to the name, Ono Island.

== Present day ==
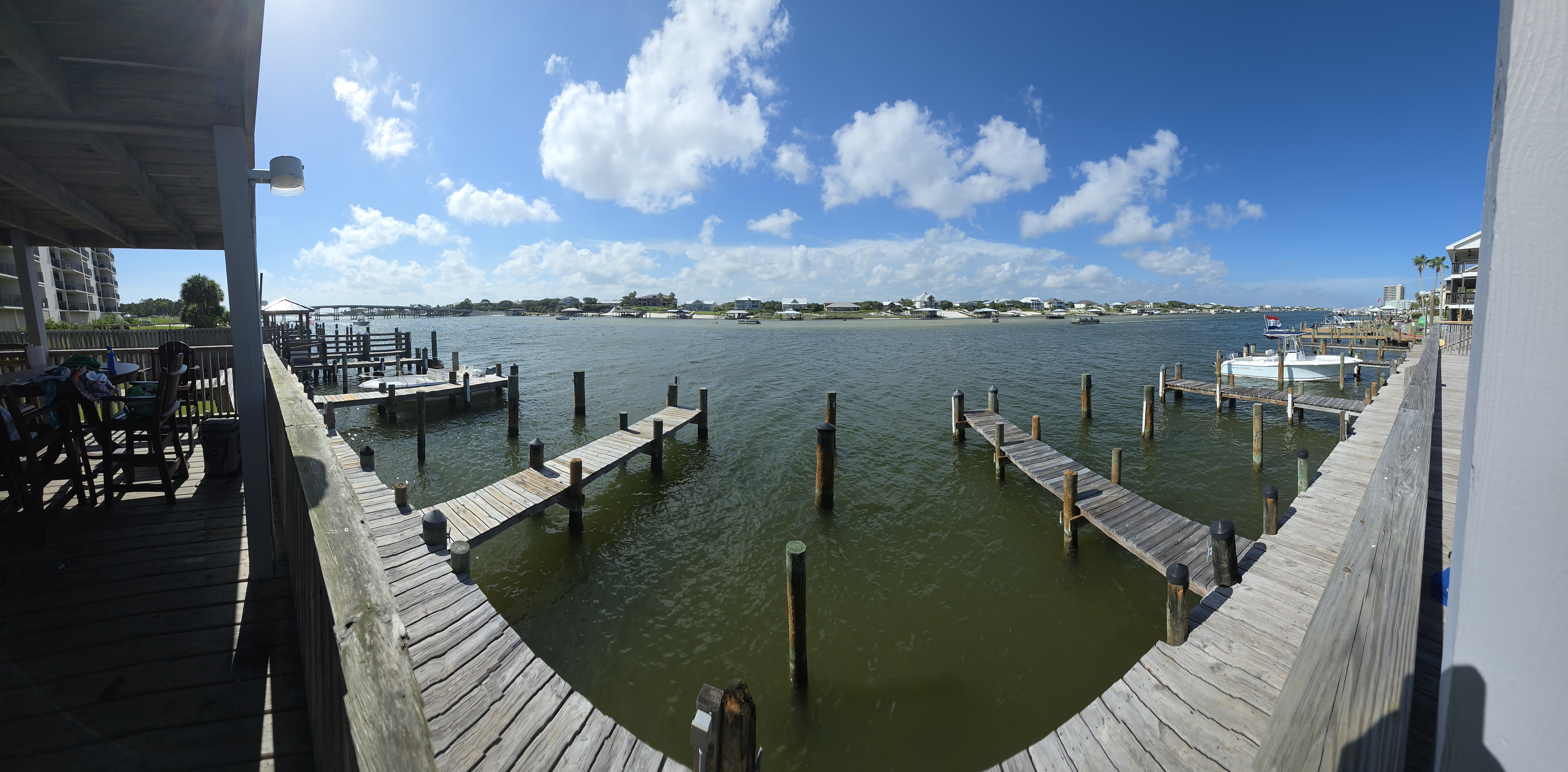
Panorama view of Ono Island from Perdido Key.

Development began in the 1970s; now there are more than 1100 homes on the island. The community has its own water tower, fire station, private harbor, two recreation centers, basketball and pickleball courts, tennis courts, a workout facility, a playground, a boat launch, a community greenspace, a guard house at the entrance, and an administrative center known as Ono House. The island has several canals used for water traffic. There are 38 roads that cover just under 15 miles in total. The Island is managed by a Property Owners Association. Development is managed by the Island's Architectural Control Committee. Home prices are among the highest in the county, with 0.3 acre lots selling for over $1.5 million for just dirt and $8 million for a lot and home. There are several community events that are open to residents only that include an annual 5k run, Easter egg hunt, 4th of July Parade, blood drive as well as numerous events put on by the various clubs on the Island. Rumors exist of secret mystic society known as Bon Temps Cabrix which translates to "Good Times Goats" that partakes in festivities related to Carnival and Mardi Gras but no one has gone on record to confirm their existence.

The community depends upon nearby Orange Beach, Alabama for fire and police services, paying $245,000 annually for the service which protects the residents. In the summer season, the population of the Island can swell to over 5,000 inhabitants but usually maintains a population lower due to the number of second home owners on the Island.

Notable residents of Ono Island have included former Healthsouth CEO Richard Scrushy and former NFL player Kenny Stabler. Comedian and inspirational speaker Andy Andrews also lives on the island. There are a number of other prominent homeowners including NFL general managers, authors, musicians, well known coaches, and business leaders who have bought on the Island for privacy. The other residents of the Island are cognizant of that and do not share who lives on the Island.

== Climate ==
Ono Island is a barrier island and subject to unabated hurricane-force winds. On July 19, 1997, the area was hit by Hurricane Danny. Rain estimates exceeded 35 inches at Dauphin Island just a few miles away. On September 16, 2004, the community suffered extensive damage when Hurricane Ivan came ashore just a few miles west. The Category 3 storm packed winds of 120 mph. The island's nearest weather reporting station is Gulf Shores, Alabama, which provides climate data. Ono Island was also impacted by Hurricane Sally in 2020 causing extensive damage.

Climate data for Ono Island, Alabama (from Gulf Shores, Alabama)
Month	Jan	Feb	Mar	Apr	May	Jun	Jul	Aug	Sep	Oct	Nov	Dec	Year
Mean daily maximum °F (°C)	60 (16)	64 (18)	70 (21)	77 (25)	83 (28)	88 (31)	90 (32)	90 (32)	87 (31)	79 (26)	70 (21)	63 (17)	77 (25)
Mean daily minimum °F (°C)	40 (4)	42 (6)	49 (9)	55 (13)	63 (17)	70 (21)	73 (23)	72 (22)	68 (20)	57 (14)	49 (9)	42 (6)	57 (14)
Average precipitation inches (mm)	6.11 (155)	5.47 (139)	6.71 (170)	4.53 (115)	5.60 (142)	5.94 (151)	8.00 (203)	6.22 (158)	5.97 (152)	3.57 (91)	5.19 (132)	4.40 (112)	67.71 (1,720)
Source: The Weather Channel
