= Perdido Bay =

Bay in Alabama and Florida, United States

Coordinates: 30.33732°N 87.46010°W

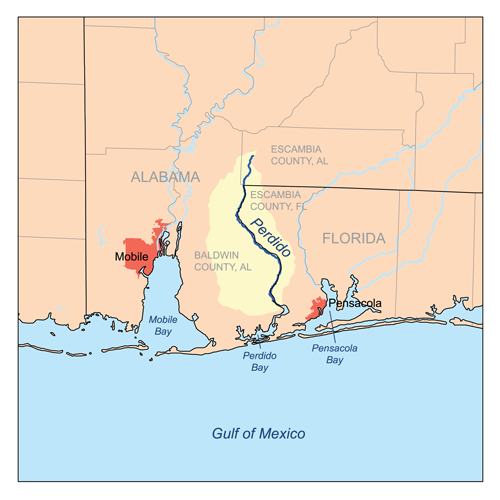
A map showing Perdido Bay and the Perdido River.

Perdido Bay is a bay at the mouth of and draining the Perdido River, a designated Outstanding Florida Waters river, in Baldwin County, Alabama, and Escambia County, Florida, United States. It is essentially a coastal lagoon enclosed by barrier islands, with an inlet, Perdido Pass.

== Geography ==
Perdido Bay lies east of the Alabama communities of Orange Beach and Lillian. It lies west of the Florida communities of Pensacola and Perdido Key.

Ono Island and the mouth of the bay are within Alabama territory. The Florida border crosses Florida Point and the barrier islands just east of Alabama Point and Perdido Pass, where the bay empties into the Gulf of Mexico. Perdido Pass also provides maritime access from Perdido Bay to the Intracoastal Waterway and the Gulf.

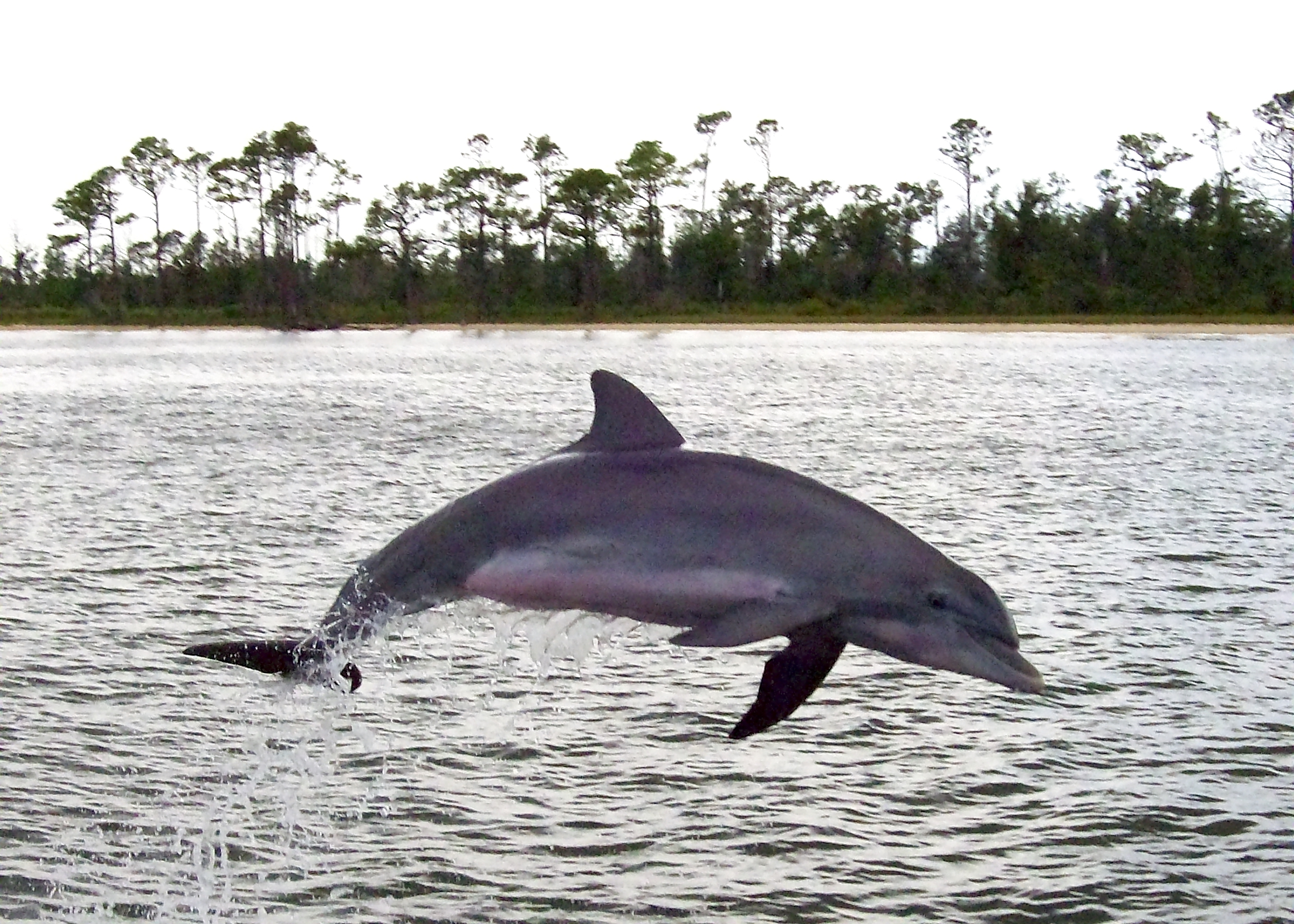
A dolphin at Perdido Bay, near Orange Beach, Alabama

== 2010 Gulf oil spill ==
Following the Deepwater Horizon oil spill (called the "Gulf oil spill"), the entrance to Perdido Pass was closed, with a barrier system in June 2010, to control tidal flow of oil entering from the Gulf of Mexico. The daily high tide was causing oil-contaminated water to enter Perdido Bay. The barrier system is designed to allow boats to travel through Perdido Pass, during the outflowing tide, but to close during the incoming tide and collect oil deposits in a retention area on the eastern edge of the pass.

== See also ==
- Gulf State Park
