= Perdido River =

River in Florida and Alabama, United States

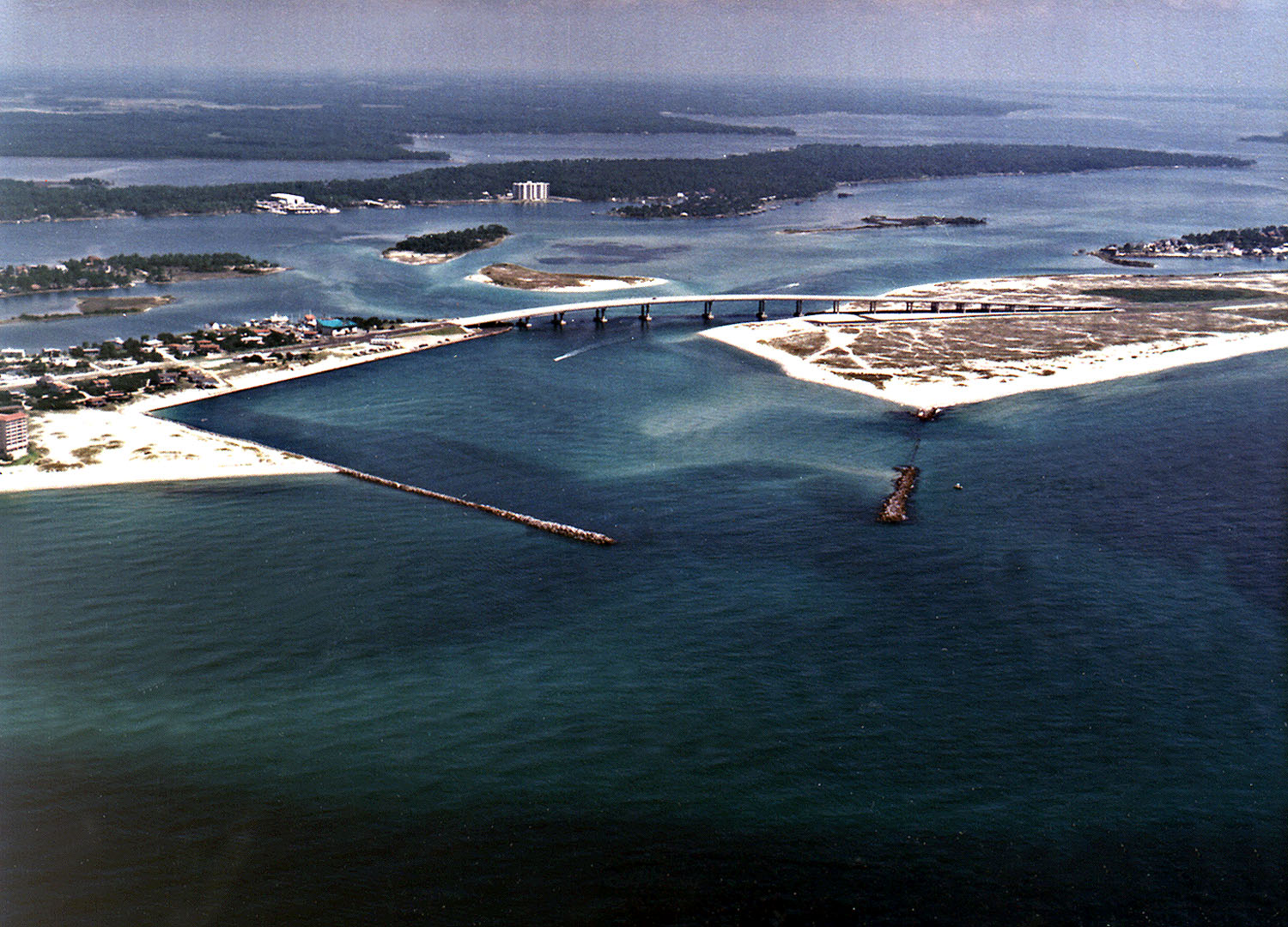
- Perdido Pass, the mouth of the Perdido River and Perdido Bay at Orange Beach, Alabama. Alabama State Route 182 crosses the inlet.

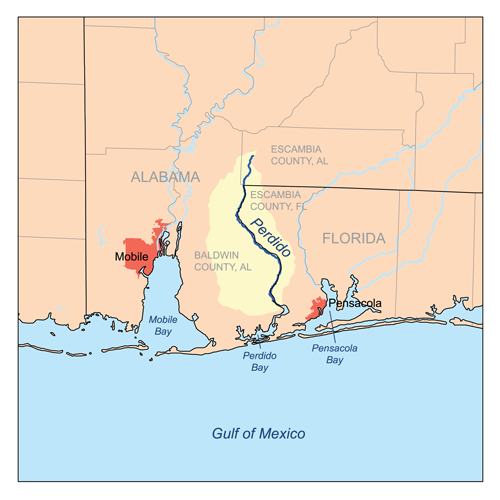

Location
- Country: United States
- State: Alabama and Florida

Physical characteristics
- Source
  - location: Escambia County, AL
- Mouth
  - location: Perdido Bay
  - elevation: sea level
- Length: 65 miles (105 km)

The Perdido River, also historically known as Rio Perdido or by its native name of Cassaba, is a 65.4-mile-long (105.3 km) river in the U.S. states of Alabama and Florida; the Perdido, a designated Outstanding Florida Waters river, forms part of the boundary between the two states along nearly its entire length and drains into the Gulf of Mexico. During the early 19th century it played a central role in a series of rotating boundary changes and disputes among France, Spain, Great Britain, and the United States.

It rises in southwestern Alabama in Escambia County approximately 8 miles (13 km) northwest of Atmore. It flows south approximately 5 miles (8 km) to latitude 31°N, south of which it forms the remainder of the Alabama/Florida border. It flows generally east-southeast in a winding course and enters the north end of Perdido Bay on the Gulf of Mexico, approximately 10 miles (16 km) west of Pensacola.

The word "perdido" is Spanish for "lost".

== History ==
From 1682 to 1763, the Perdido formed the boundary between the French colony of Louisiana and the Spanish colony of Florida. Following the British victory over the French in the French and Indian War, Great Britain received the French colonial territory between the Mississippi River and the Perdido River, as well as the Spanish colony of Florida, while Spain received the formerly French territory west of the Mississippi, plus the city of New Orleans. The British divided their newly acquired colony into West Florida and East Florida at the Apalachicola River (whose main tributary, the Chattahoochee River, forms a large portion of the present boundary between Alabama and Georgia, and a small part of the Florida/Georgia boundary).

Twenty years later, as part of the Treaty of Paris, Britain returned all of Florida to Spain, at which point Spain controlled the entire coast of the Gulf of Mexico. (Spain maintained the West and East Florida colonial designations that the British had established.)

In 1800, as part of the Treaty of San Ildefonso, Spain returned the Louisiana colony to France, retaining control of the lands east of the Mississippi River (except New Orleans). In 1803, France sold Louisiana (New France) to the United States in the Louisiana Purchase.

A boundary dispute erupted between the U.S. and Spain, with the U.S. claiming the land west of the Perdido River as part of the original Louisiana (New France) colony, whereas the Spanish claimed that only the portion of Louisiana west of the Mississippi River had been returned to France. The Gulf coast south of 31 degrees latitude, between the Mississippi and Perdido rivers, remained disputed between the two nations. In 1810, the Republic of West Florida successfully declared its independence from a weakened Spain. Ninety days later, U.S. military forces entered its capital (St. Francisville, Louisiana) and effectively annexed the short-lived nation. However, this action did not extend all the way to the Perdido River.

During the War of 1812 (1812–15), U.S. military forces entered Mobile to enforce the surrender of the Spanish officials there. A year or so later, U.S. garrisons were defending Gulf coast forts against British naval attacks and attempting to stop the British Army from capturing New Orleans. This coastal area (today's Mississippi and Alabama Gulf coasts), the land west of the Perdido River, was incorporated into the Mississippi Territory by the United States. In 1817 the Alabama Territory was carved out of the eastern half of the Mississippi Territory.

The dispute with Spain was finally resolved in 1819 with the Adams-Onís Treaty, in which Spain ceded all of Florida to the United States. The treaty wasn't ratified by the Spanish government until a couple of years later. In 1822 the Florida Territory was established, with the Perdido River as the (coastal) boundary between it and the new state of Alabama.
