= Alabama State Route 161 =

State highway in Alabama, United States

State Route 161

Route information
- Maintained by ALDOT
- Length: 30.472 mi (49.040 km)
- Existed: 1948–present

Major junctions
- South end: SR 182 in Orange Beach
- North end: I-10 in Robertsdale

Location
- Country: United States
- State: Alabama
- Counties: Baldwin County

Highway system
- Alabama State Highway System; Interstate; US; State
← SR 160	→ SR 162

State Route 161 (SR 161) is a 30.5 Miles Long state highway near the beaches of Baldwin County near the Gulf of Mexico in the southwestern part of the U.S. state of Alabama. The southern terminus of the highway is at an intersection with SR 182 in the south-central part of Orange Beach. The northern terminus of the highway is at an intersection with Interstate 10 near Loxley.

== Route description ==
SR 161 begins at an intersection with SR 182 (Perdido Beach Boulevard) on the Gulf of Mexico in the south-central part of Orange Beach. It travels to the north on four-lane undivided Orange Beach Boulevard past beach resort areas. The road turns northeast and becomes a five lane road with a center left-turn lane. It very briefly leaves the city limits of Orange Beach. It travels through a portion of Gulf State Park and then skirts along the eastern edge of the park. The highway re-enters Orange Beach and curves back to the north. It then travels through a mix of wooded wetlands and residential development. Farther north, SR 161 travels through housing subdivisions before continuing into wooded areas. The highway passes businesses prior to reaching its northern terminus, an intersection with SR 180 in the north-central part of Orange Beach. It serves as an alternate route for motorists heading north from the beaches of eastern Baldwin County to avoid traffic congestion in Gulf Shores. Along with SR 59 and SR 135, it is one of three highways that connect SR 182 and SR 180.

== Major intersections ==
The entire route is in Orange Beach, Baldwin County.

mi	km	Destinations	Notes
0.000	0.000	SR 182 (Perdido Beach Boulevard) – Pensacola, Gulf Shores	Southern terminus
1.716	2.762	SR 180 east (Canal Road) – Bear Point	Eastern end of SR 180 overlap
4.573	7.360	SR 180 west (Canal Road) – Gulf Shores	Western end of SR 180 overlap; Beginning of Foley Beach Expressway
13.541	21.792	US 98 – Foley, Pensacola	
17.397	27.998	SR 308 (Foley Beach Expressway Branch) – Foley	End Foley Beach Expressway; Begin Baldwin Beach Expressway
25.426	40.919	US 90 – Robertsdale, Pensacola	
30.472	49.040	I-10 – Mobile, Pensacola	Northern Terminus
1.000 mi = 1.609 km; 1.000 km = 0.621 mi
