= Baldwin Beach Express =

Highway in Alabama

Baldwin Beach Express

Route information
- Maintained by Beach Express
- Length: 13.2 mi (21.2 km)
- Existed: August 15, 2014–present

Major junctions
- South end: CR 28 / Foley Beach Express in Foley
- US 90 east of Robertsdale; I-10 east of Loxley
- North end: CR 68 east of Loxley

Location
- Country: United States
- State: Alabama
- Counties: Baldwin

Highway system
- Alabama State Highway System; Interstate; US; State

Baldwin Beach Express (BBE) is a 13.2-mile-long (21.2 km) four-lane highway near the beaches of Baldwin County near the Gulf of Mexico in the southwestern part of the U.S. state of Alabama. It was built to relieve traffic on heavily traveled State Route 59 (SR 59). The interchange with Interstate 10 (I-10) was the last piece of the highway that was completed. The southern terminus of the highway is at an intersection with both County Route 28 (CR 28) and the Foley Beach Express (FBE) in the far north part of Foley. The northern terminus of the highway is at an intersection with CR 68 east of Loxley.

== Route description ==
The BBE begins at an intersection with the FBE in the far northern part of Foley. Here, the roadway continues as CR 28. It travels due north from its southern terminus and then intersects the eastern terminus of a western segment CR 28. It then intersects CR 32. It crosses over a tributary of Negro Creek and then the creek itself. It intersects CR 34 (Lehman Road). It then intersects CR 36. One block later is an intersection with the southern terminus of CR 38 and the eastern terminus of Dubose Road. Another block later is an intersection with the western terminus of a northern segment of CR 38. It crosses over Waterhole Branch and then intersects CR 48. After crossings of Rock Creek and Blackwater River, it intersects U.S. Route 90 (US 90; Old Spanish Trail). The BBE crosses over Davis Branch and then intersects CR 62. Then, the highway curves to the north-northwest and then intersects CR 64. It curves back to the north and intersects CR 68. The two highways travel concurrently to an interchange with Interstate 10 (I-10) at exit 49. Just north of the interchange, at an intersection with the southern terminus of Roserun Road, the BBE ends and the roadway, as CR 68, curves to a due east direction.

== History ==
The BBE opened to traffic on August 15, 2014. It was built to relieve traffic on heavily traveled SR 59, and the interchange with I-10 was the last segment completed.

== Major intersections ==
The entire route is in Baldwin County.

Location	mi	km	Destinations	Notes
Foley	0.0	0.0	CR 28 south / Foley Beach Express to SR 59 – Orange Beach	Southern terminus of BBE; road continues as CR 28 south
			CR 28 west	Eastern terminus of northern segment of CR 28
			CR 32	
			CR 34	
			CR 36	
			CR 38 east	Western terminus of southern segment of CR 38
			CR 38 east	Western terminus of northern segment of CR 38
			CR 48	
			CR 50 (Bengston Road)	
			SR 104 west (East Silverhill Avenue) – Robertsdale	Eastern terminus of SR 104
	8.1	13.0	US 90 (Old Spanish Trail / SR 16) – Robertsdale, Pensacola	
			CR 62	
			CR 64	
			CR 68 west (Buc-ee's Blvd) – Loxley	Southern end of CR 68 concurrency
	12.9– 13.1	20.8– 21.1	I-10 – Mobile, Pensacola	I-10 exit 49
			CR 68 east / Roserun Road north	Northern terminus of BBE; southern terminus of Roserun Road; northern end of CR 68 concurrency
1.000 mi = 1.609 km; 1.000 km = 0.621 mi: Concurrency terminus; Route transition
