= Alabama State Route 182 =

State highway in Alabama, United States

State Route 182

Route information
- Maintained by ALDOT
- Length: 17.046 mi (27.433 km)

Major junctions
- West end: Pine Beach
- SR 59 in Gulf Shores; SR 135 in Gulf Shores; SR 161 in Orange Beach
- East end: SR 292 in Orange Beach

Location
- Country: United States
- State: Alabama
- Counties: Baldwin

Highway system
- Alabama State Highway System; Interstate; US; State
← SR 181	→ SR 183

State Route 182 (SR 182) is a 17.046-mile (27.433 km) state highway that serves as the primary east-west connection along the Alabama shoreline of the Gulf of Mexico between Gulf Shores and Orange Beach in Baldwin County. The western terminus of SR 182 dead-ends at a private resort in Pine Beach, and the eastern terminus is located at the Florida state line.

== Route description ==
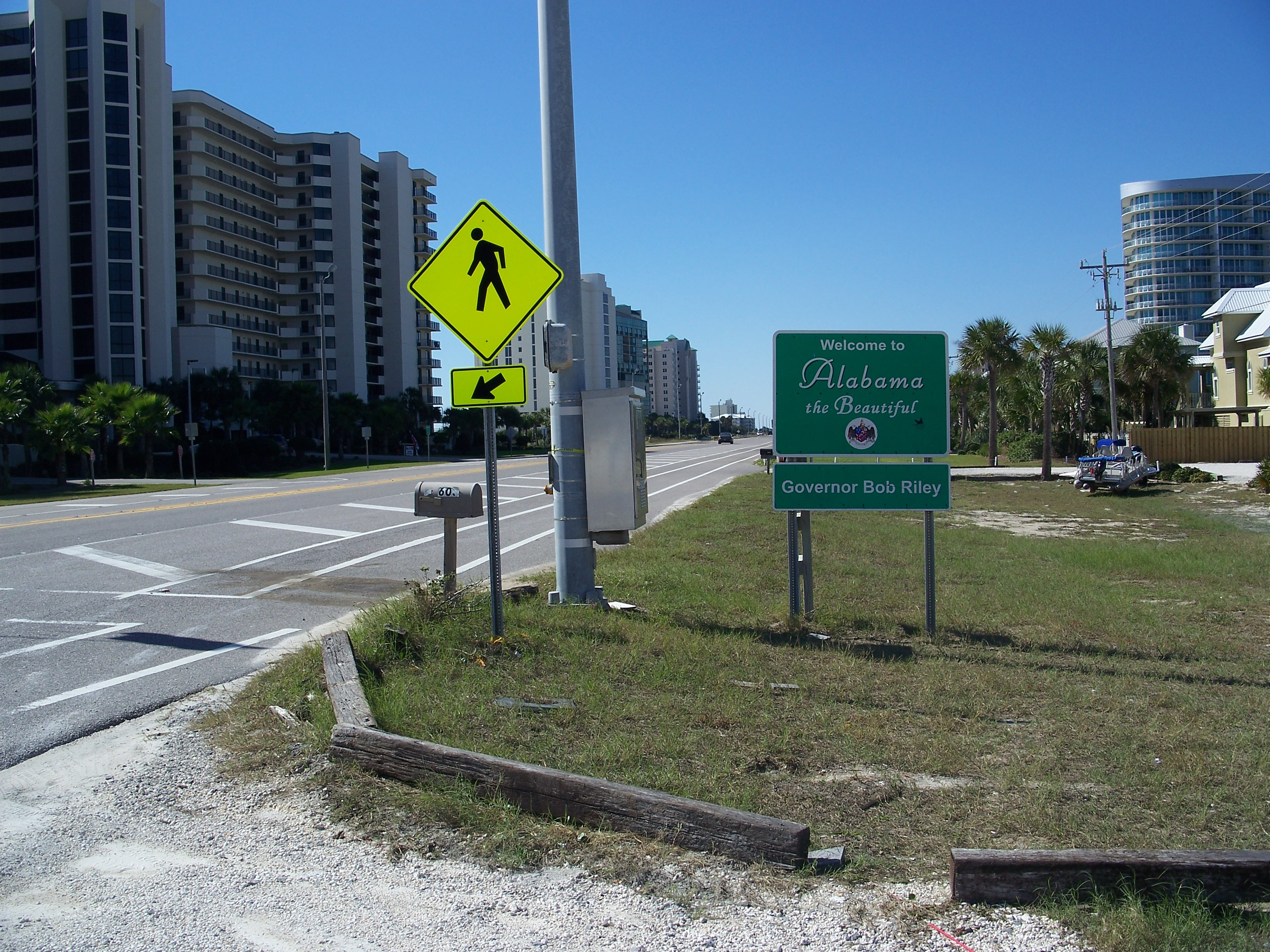
Alabama Welcome sign on the Alabama-Florida border on SR 182 in Orange Beach

SR 182 begins at a private resort in Pine Beach. From this point, the route travels in an easterly course paralleling the shoreline of the Gulf of Mexico through both Gulf Shores and Orange Beach en route to its eastern terminus at the Florida state line. Upon entering Florida, the route continues as State Road 292 (SR 292).

== Major intersections ==
The entire route is in Baldwin County.

Location	mi	km	Destinations	Notes
Gulf Shores	0.000	0.000	Laguna Key	
Gulf Shores	6.467	10.408	SR 59 north to I-10 / Foley Beach Express north – toll ferry	SR-59 southern terminus
Gulf Shores	7.907	12.725	SR 135 north – Gulf State Park Picnic Area	SR-135 southern terminus
Orange Beach	12.886	20.738	SR 161 north to SR 180 / Foley Beach Express north / I-10	SR-161 southern terminus
Orange Beach	17.046	27.433	SR 292 east (Perdido Key Drive) – Pensacola	Florida state line
1.000 mi = 1.609 km; 1.000 km = 0.621 mi
