= Alabama State Route 181 =

State highway in Alabama, United States

State Route 181

Route information
- Maintained by ALDOT
- Length: 18.235 mi (29.346 km)

Major junctions
- South end: US 98 in Barnwell
- SR 104 in Fairhope; US 90 in Daphne; I-10 in Daphne
- North end: US 31 in Spanish Fort

Location
- Country: United States
- State: Alabama
- Counties: Baldwin

Highway system
- Alabama State Highway System; Interstate; US; State
| ← SR 180 | → SR 182 |

State Route 181 (SR 181) is a 18.235-mile-long (29.346 km) route in Baldwin County in the southwestern part of the state. The southern terminus of the route is at its junction with US 98 near Magnolia Springs. The northern terminus of the route is at its junction with US 31, near Spanish Fort.

== Route description ==
SR 181 includes both a four lane section and a lengthy two lane section which was once known as Baldwin County Road 27 (CR 27). The four-lane section travels through commercial retail areas and across I-10. The two lane section begins a few miles south of the intersection with US 90 (SR 16) in the Malbis community. Plans are in place to improve the route to four lanes through its entire length. The southernmost two miles (3.2 km) contain two sharp 90 degree turns which require traffic to slow to 25 mph in order to be safely navigated. Along US 98 (SR 42) at its intersection with SR 181, the route signs show SR 181 north being co-signed with CR 27. However, nowhere else along the route does signage for CR 27 exist.

== History ==
SR 181 was created in the 1970s as a short connector between US 31 and US 90 with an interchange with I-10 in between. At its southern terminus with US 90 is the historic Malbis Plantation. The road continued south of US 90 as Baldwin County Route 27 (CR 27) and served many rural areas and local interests in SW Baldwin County. In July 2004, a road exchange occurred: the road extended south from US 90 to US 98, replacing part of CR 27, and SR 112 was decommissioned and redesignated as Baldwin County Route 112. There are still some businesses along this route which use "Route 27" in their names even though it has been 20 years since the route became SR 181. Some newer businesses use "Route 181" in their business names. The northernmost two miles (3.2 km) of the route between US 31 and US 90, including the interchange with I-10 has become heavily commercialized with shopping, dining, and hotels. Before becoming a state route, there were only two or three traffic signals along the entire route south of US 90. In 2013, there were 10-12 traffic signals with future plans for more as the area continues to grow. WalMart now has a SuperCenter along the route near Fairhope, south of the intersection with SR 104. This supercenter, unlike many others, was designed in a way that it fits into the landscape without detracting from the local scenery.

Many local residents use this route as a north–south alternative to US 98 which runs parallel to it a few miles to the west. US 98 travels through the cities of Daphne and Fairhope while SR 181 travels through rural country. It has also become an alternative north–south route to SR 59 which runs parallel to it a few miles to the east.

== Beach route ==
SR 181 is mainly known and used by locals (many from Mobile) as a route to the beaches at Gulf Shores and Orange Beach. This route provides a way to avoid the heavy tourist traffic along SR 59. SR 181 is used to connect to US 98 east and after crossing over the bridge at Weeks Bay turning south onto CR 49 at Magnolia Springs, Alabama. Proceeding south along CR 49 to CR 12, then left on CR 12 to CR 65 south, then a short distance south to CR 10 where a left turn will take the driver east to intersect SR 59 just north of the Gulf Shores city limits. This routing is mainly flat and straight through south Baldwin County farm country and the final segment crosses the Bon Secour River just west of SR 59.

== Topography ==
SR 181 runs directly north to south with no curves for 16 miles (26 km) of its 18-mile (29 km) route. It runs parallel to the Fish River which empties into the Mobile Bay via Weeks Bay. Most of the land along SR 181 is rural farmland but since being rechristened as a state route in the 1990s, it has become more heavily traveled and commercially and residentially developed.

== Major intersections ==
The entire route is in Baldwin County.

| Location | mi | km | Destinations | Notes |
|---|---|---|---|---|
| Barnwell | 0.0 | 0.0 | US 98 (SR 42) – Magnolia Springs, Fairhope | Southern terminus |
| Fairhope | 9.2 | 14.8 | SR 104 – Downtown, Silverhill, Robertsdale | |
| Daphne | 16.795 | 27.029 | US 90 (SR 16) – Mobile, Loxley | |
| Daphne | 17.295 | 27.834 | I-10 – Mobile, Pensacola | I-10 exit 38 |
| Spanish Fort | 18.235 | 29.346 | US 31 (SR 3) – Downtown, Bay Minette | Northern terminus |
1.000 mi = 1.609 km; 1.000 km = 0.621 mi
