= Alabama State Route 135 =

State highway in Alabama, United States

State Route 135

Route information
- Maintained by ALDOT
- Length: 2.138 mi (3.441 km)
- Existed: 1957–present

Major junctions
- South end: SR 182 in Gulf Shores
- North end: SR 180 in Gulf Shores

Location
- Country: United States
- State: Alabama
- Counties: Baldwin

Highway system
- Alabama State Highway System; Interstate; US; State
← SR 134	→ SR 136

State Route 135 (SR 135) is a 2.138-mile (3.441 km) state highway in southern Baldwin County in the southwestern part of the U.S. state of Alabama. The southern terminus of the highway is at an intersection with SR 182 in Gulf Shores. The northern terminus of the route is at an intersection with SR 180, also in Gulf Shores. It serves as a connecting route between those two highways. The entire highway is inside the boundary of Gulf State Park.

== Route description ==
SR 135 begins at an intersection with SR 182 (East Beach Boulevard) in the southwestern part of Gulf State Park. It curves to the northwest and passes Shelby Lake. Then, it curves to the west-northwest before curving back to the northwest. It crosses over State Lake Channel and then curves to the northeast. Then, it curves to the west-southwest and intersects SR 180 (East Fort Morgan Road/East 2nd Street) on the western edge of the park.

== Major intersections ==
The entire route is in Gulf Shores, Baldwin County.

mi	km	Destinations	Notes
0.000	0.000	SR 182	Southern terminus
2.138	3.441	SR 180 to SR 59 / Foley Beach Express north	Northern terminus
1.000 mi = 1.609 km; 1.000 km = 0.621 mi
