= Alabama State Route 287 =

State highway in Alabama, United States

State Route 287
- SR 287 highlighted in red

Route information
- Maintained by ALDOT
- Length: 6.370 mi (10.252 km)

Major junctions
- South end: US 31 in Bay Minette
- SR 59 in Bay Minette; I-65 north of Bay Minette
- North end: CR 47 in Bay Minette

Location
- Country: United States
- State: Alabama
- Counties: Baldwin

Highway system
- Alabama State Highway System; Interstate; US; State
← SR 285	→ SR 289

State Route 287 (SR 287) is a 6.370-mile-long (10.252 km) route that serves as a connection between Exit 37 off Interstate 65 (I-65) north of Bay Minette and U.S. Route 31 (US 31) in downtown Bay Minette in Baldwin County.

== Route description ==
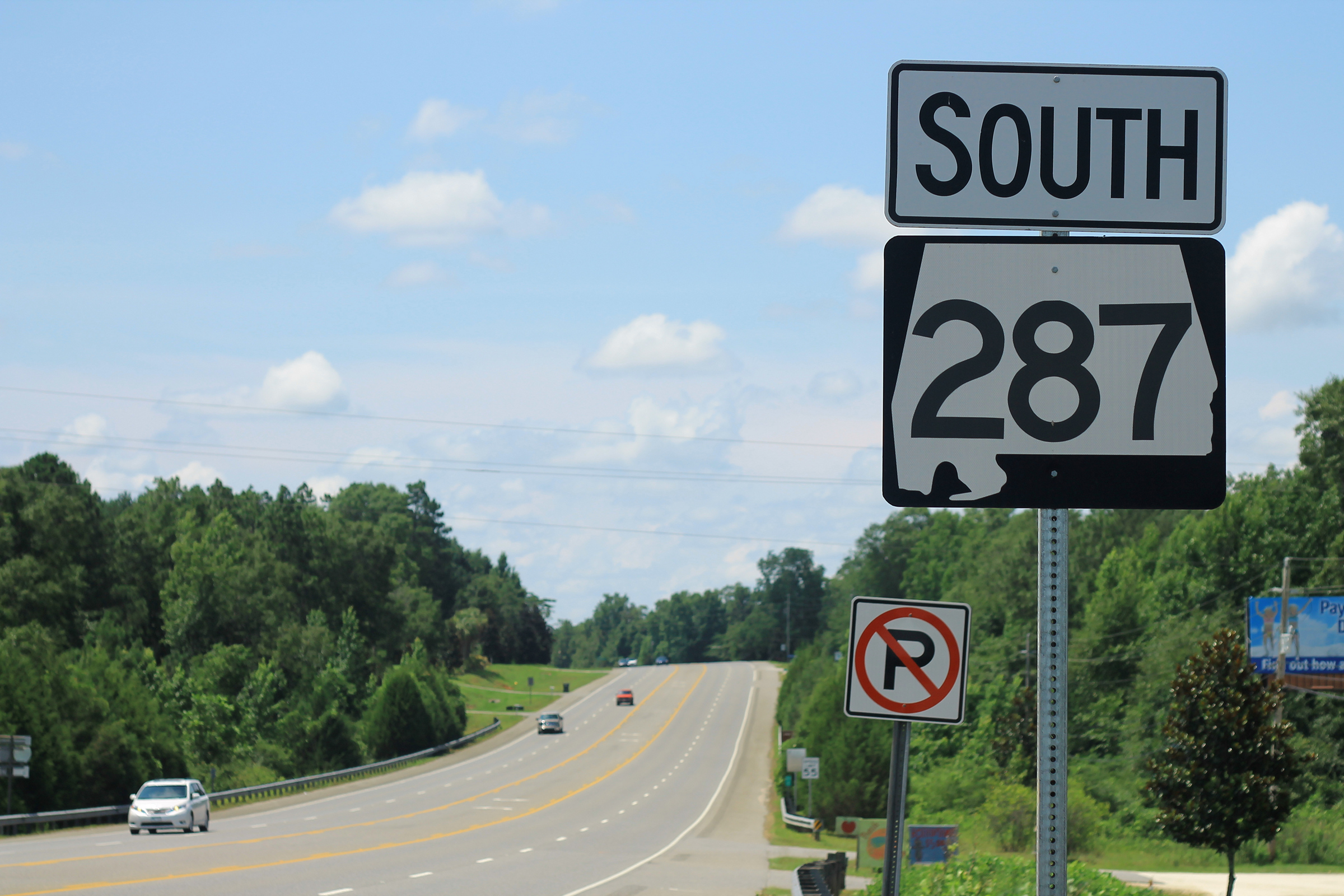
A sign denoting State Route 287, located north of Bay Minette.

The southern terminus of SR 287 is located at its intersection with US 31 in the central business district of Bay Minette. From this point, the route travels in a northwesterly direction through its intersection with SR 59, where it turns towards the northeast. The route continues in this northeasterly direction where it meets I-65 and ultimately terminates just to the north of the interchange and transitions to County Road 47 (CR 47).

== Major intersections ==
The entire route is in Baldwin County.

Location	mi	km	Destinations	Notes
Bay Minette	0.000	0.000	US 31 (East 2nd Street/D'Olive Street/SR 3) to SR 59 south – Mobile, Spanish Fort, Atmore	Traffic circle around Baldwin County Courthouse; southern terminus
Bay Minette	1.972	3.174	SR 59 (McMeans Avenue/Hand Avenue) to I-65 – Mobile, Loxley, Uriah	
	6.253	10.063	I-65 – Mobile, Montgomery	I-65 exit 37
	6.370	10.252	CR 47 north (Rabun Road) – Rabun	Continuation beyond northern terminus; end of state maintenance
1.000 mi = 1.609 km; 1.000 km = 0.621 mi
