= Alabama State Route 180 =

State highway in Alabama, United States

State Route 180
- SR 180 highlighted in red

Route information
- Maintained by ALDOT
- Length: 28.359 mi (45.639 km)

Major junctions
- West end: SR 193 / Mobile Bay Ferry in Fort Morgan
- SR 59 in Gulf Shores; SR 135 in Gulf Shores; SR 161 in Orange Beach
- East end: East Oak Ridge Drive in Orange Beach

Location
- Country: United States
- State: Alabama
- Counties: Baldwin

Highway system
- Alabama State Highway System; Interstate; US; State
← SR 179	→ SR 181

State Route 180 (SR 180) is a 28.359-mile-long (45.639 km) state highway that serves as a west-to-east highway in Baldwin County, and travels between the cities of Fort Morgan and Orange Beach. It, along with State Route 182, is one of two state routes in the southern part of the county between the Intracoastal Waterway and the Gulf of Mexico. It goes through Gulf Shores, but the route does not reach the Florida border.

== Route description ==
State Route 180 begins at the Mobile Bay Ferry at Fort Morgan. From this point, the route travels in an easterly course paralleling the shoreline of the Gulf of Mexico through both Gulf Shores and Orange Beach en route to its eastern terminus at East Oak Ridge Drive.

== Major intersections ==
The entire route is in Baldwin County.

Location	mi	km	Destinations	Notes
Fort Morgan	0.000	0.000	Mobile Bay Ferry to SR 193 – Dauphin Island	Western terminus
Gulf Shores	20.750	33.394	SR 59 – Downtown, Foley	
Gulf Shores	21.084	33.931	SR 135 south	Northern terminus of SR 135
Orange Beach	25.449	40.956	Foley Beach Express north to I-10 / I-65 – Foley	Southern terminus of the Foley Beach Express
Orange Beach	28.359	45.639	SR 161 south	Eastern terminus; northern terminus of SR 161
1.000 mi = 1.609 km; 1.000 km = 0.621 mi
