= Foley Beach Express =

Highway in Baldwin County, Alabama

Route information
- Maintained by Beach Express
- Length: 14.0 mi (22.5 km)
- Existed: June 2000–present
- Tourist routes: Alabama's Coastal Connection

Major junctions
- South end: SR 180 in Orange Beach
- US 98 in Foley; CR 28 / Baldwin Beach Express in Foley
- North end: SR 59 in Foley

Location
- Country: United States
- State: Alabama
- Counties: Baldwin

Highway system
- Alabama State Highway System; Interstate; US; State

Foley Beach Express (FBE) is a 14.0-mile-long (22.5 km) limited-access two- to four-lane highway near the beaches of Baldwin County and the Gulf of Mexico in the southwestern part of the U.S. state of Alabama. It serves as an alternate route for the heavily traveled State Route 59 (SR 59) in nearby Gulf Shores. The southern terminus of the highway is at an intersection with SR 180 in the northwestern part of Orange Beach. The northern terminus of the highway is at an intersection with SR 59 in the far north part of Foley. The extreme southern portion of the highway is part of Alabama's Coastal Connection, a National Scenic Byway.

The bridge near the southern terminus on the FBE is a comparably quicker connection with the Alabama mainland. It shaves off miles and minutes from crossing the Gulf Intracoastal Waterway at SR 59 in Gulf Shores. The bridge was owned by American Roads and was in danger of bankruptcy in 2013, due to American Roads' $830 million debt from the FBE and other toll roads it owned. Syncora Guarantee eventually became the new owner.

In 2024, the Alabama Department of Transportation bought the bridge and abolished tolls on May 23.

== Route description ==
The FBE begins at an intersection with SR 180 (Canal Road) in the northwestern part of Orange Beach. It travels to the north-northwest and curves to the northwest. It crosses over Portage Creek and the Gulf Intracoastal Waterway on an unnamed toll bridge. This bridge also crosses over County Route 4 (CR 4; Brown Lane). Just after the bridge ends, the highway has a tollbooth. Immediately after the tollbooth is an intersection with the eastern terminus of CR 4. The highway curves to a nearly due north direction and crosses over an unnamed branch of Portage Creek. It then leaves the city limits of Orange Beach. The FBE then curves to the west before a crossing of Cotton Creek. Upon crossing the creek, it curves to the north-northwest. It has an intersection with CR 8, which is only accessible from the southbound lanes of the FBE. It passes the campus of Columbia Southern University. At an intersection with CR 12, the highway enters Foley. Approximately 1 mile (1.6 km) later is an intersection with CR 20 (Miflin Road). Here, the Alabama's Coastal Connection designation turns to the east, while the FBE continues to the north. It curves to the northeast and crosses over Wolf Creek before curving back to the north. It then intersects U.S. Route 98 (US 98). Then, the highway curves to the west and has an intersection with the northern terminus of CR 28 and the southern terminus of the Baldwin Beach Express (BBE). It has an intersection with CR 73 just before reaching its northern terminus, an intersection with SR 59.

== History ==
The FBE was built in two sections: the toll-free Foley Bypass, and the then-toll bridge and its approach road. The cost of the highway was $44 million. It was funded by a $36 million private taxable toll revenue bond issue, with additional grants from the Federal Highway Administration and the City of Foley.

It opened to traffic in June 2000.

On July 8, 2015, two barges hit the safety fender of the toll bridge at about 2:15 am. Approximately 60 feet (18 m) of the fender was removed. The bridge was inspected at about 11:00 am, while police and fire boats helped to maintain the area while divers were underwater. The bridge was reopened to traffic at about 1:30 pm.

In May 2024, the Alabama Department of Transportation brought the toll bridge into Orange Beach, and on May 23 toll collection ceased permanently. Demolition of the toll plaza will happen soon afterward.

== Major intersections ==
The entire route is in Baldwin County.

Location	mi	km	Destinations	Notes
Orange Beach	0.0	0.0	SR 180 (Alabama's Coastal Connection west) – Orange Beach, Perdido Key, Gulf Shores	Southern terminus; southern end of Alabama's Coastal Connection concurrency
Orange Beach			CR 4 west (Brown Lane)	Eastern terminus of CR 4; no access from FBE south to CR 4 or vice versa
Orange Beach			Bradford Road to CR 4	No access from FBE north to Bradford Road or vice versa
Orange Beach			CR 8 west	Eastern terminus of CR 8; no access from FBE north to CR 8 or vice versa
Foley			CR 12	
Foley			CR 20 (Alabama's Coastal Connection east)	Northern end of Alabama's Coastal Connection concurrency
Foley	9.0	14.5	US 98 (SR 42) – Elberta, Lillian	
Foley	12.9	20.8	CR 28 south / Baldwin Beach Express north to I-10	Northern terminus of CR 28; Southern terminus of the BBE
Foley			CR 73	
Foley	14.0	22.5	SR 59 – Gulf Shores, Robertsdale	Northern terminus
1.000 mi = 1.609 km; 1.000 km = 0.621 mi: Concurrency terminus; Incomplete access
