= Alabama State Route 104 =

State highway in Alabama, United States

State Route 104

Route information
- Maintained by ALDOT
- Length: 10.769 mi (17.331 km)

Major junctions
- West end: US 98 / CR 98 in Fairhope
- East end: SR 59 / CR 83 in Robertsdale

Location
- Country: United States
- State: Alabama
- Counties: Baldwin

Highway system
- Alabama State Highway System; Interstate; US; State
← SR 103	→ SR 105

State Route 104 (SR 104) is a 10.769-mile-long (17.331 km) state highway completely within Baldwin County in the southwestern part of the U.S. state of Alabama. The western terminus of the highway is at an intersection with U.S. Route 98 (US 98) in Fairhope. The eastern terminus of the highway is at an intersection with SR 59 in Robertsdale.

== Route description ==
SR 104 begins at an intersection with US 98 (North Greeno Road) in Fairhope, in Baldwin County. Here, the roadway continues as CR 98 (Homestead Avenue). SR 104 travels to the east and leaves the city limits of Fairhope. It has an intersection with CR 13 and then crosses over Fly Creek. The highway intersects SR 181. It crosses over Pensacola Branch, Fish River, and Perone Branch before intersecting the northern terminus of CR 9 (Sedlack Road). A short distance later is an intersection with CR 49. SR 104 enters Silverhill, where it passes Silverhill Elementary School, intersects CR 55 (Broad Street), passes Oscar Johnson Park, and crosses over Silver Creek. The highway then enters Robertsdale. It intersects CR 65 (Palmer Street). A short distance later, it meets its eastern terminus, an intersection with SR 59 (Milwaukee Street). Here, the roadway continues to the east as CR 83 (East Silverhill Avenue).

== History ==
The western terminus of SR 104 was truncated in the mid-1950s. Prior to that time, the highway continued northward from Fairhope to an intersection with US 90 in Daphne. By 1957, the section of the highway between Fairhope and Daphne was redesignated as US 98.

== Major intersections ==
The entire route is in Baldwin County.

Location	mi	km	Destinations	Notes
Fairhope	0.000	0.000	US 98 (SR 42) / CR 98 west (Homestead Avenue) to I-10 – Mobile	Western terminus
	2.184	3.515	SR 181	
Robertsdale	10.769	17.331	SR 59 (Milwaukee Street) / CR 83 east (East Silverhill Avenue) to Foley Beach Express south	Eastern terminus of SR 104; western terminus of CR 53
1.000 mi = 1.609 km; 1.000 km = 0.621 mi
