= Alabama Gulf Coast Zoo =

Zoo in Gulf Shores, Alabama, United States

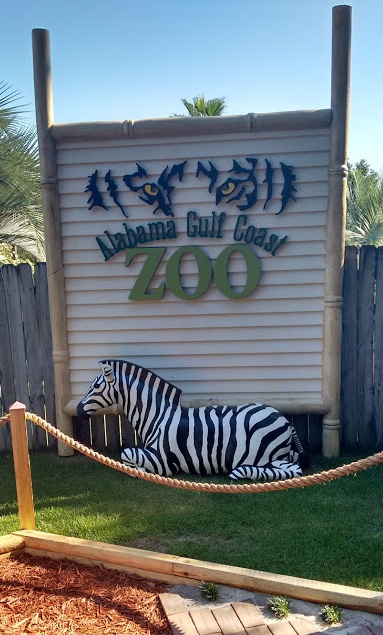
- A display near the entrance of the Alabama Gulf Coast Zoo
- Interactive map of Alabama Gulf Coast Zoo
- 30.3126764°N 87.6717442°W
- Date opened: June 1989
- Location: Gulf Shores, Alabama, Alabama
- Land area: 25 acres (10 ha)
- No. of animals: 300
- Annual visitors: 100,000
- Website: www.alabamagulfcoastzoo.com

The Alabama Gulf Coast Zoo opened in June 1989 in Gulf Shores, Alabama, United States as Zooland Animal Park. It is operated by the Zoo Foundation, Inc., a 501(c)(3) non-profit organization. It relies on admissions, memberships and contributions for its funding. It was the basis of the Animal Planet show The Little Zoo That Could.

The zoo sits on approximately 25 acres and lies about two miles north of the Intracoastal Waterway and is home to more than 300 animals including giraffes, baboons, Barbary lions, lynxess, tigers, muntjacs, cattle, lemurs, sloths, wolves, bears, monkeys, turacos, kangaroos, alligators, and snakes. It includes a petting zoo, reptile house, and aviary, as well as daily animal shows in the summer. The zoo opened its new location in early 2020.

== History ==
The Alabama Gulf Coast Zoo started as the private project of Robin Willis and Joey Ward of Gulf Shores, and opened in June 1989 as Zooland Animal Park. The Ward family created the Zoo Foundation Inc. (a 501(c)(3) non-profit organization) in 1991 to operate the zoo, at the same time donating the 17 acres (6.9 ha) that make up the zoo today. An additional 13 acres (5.3 ha), which are still undeveloped, were donated by the Ward family and the Erie Meyer Foundation in 1994.

In July 1997, Hurricane Danny hit Gulf Shores. Then in 1998, Hurricane Georges hit, causing more flood damage. The zoo evacuated all of its animals in both cases, transporting them 15 miles (24 km) inland to higher ground and becoming the first zoo to have a full-scale evacuation during a hurricane. These expensive evacuations, and the repairs following the hurricanes, almost caused the zoo to close in 1999, but fund raising efforts were successful in raising enough money to keep it open. Hurricane Ivan in 2004 caused $500,000 in damage, forcing another evacuation and closing the zoo for 14 months. Several animals were not caught during this evacuation, and were lost. More evacuations resulted from Dennis and Katrina in 2005, but the zoo was able to reopen fairly quickly in October 2005.

== The Little Zoo That Could ==
The flurry of activity around the zoo attracted media attention during Hurricane Ivan, and the zoo was approached about doing a series for Animal Planet. Shooting for the series started in 2005, and the first of thirteen episodes of The Little Zoo that Could aired in February 2006. The series focused on the zoo's efforts to reopen after being battered by three major hurricanes in 2004 and 2005: Hurricane Ivan, Hurricane Dennis, and Hurricane Katrina. A one-hour follow-up on the series aired in February 2007. The zoo announced that they are in the process of making a new show, suspected to air about the same time the new zoo opens.

== The future ==
The local community and businesses have donated money, building supplies, and services in the past. On-going funding through sponsorships, grants, and endowments from major corporations did not exist before 1998, but are now being pursued to ensure the zoo’s future.

In 2009, the zoo unveiled a plan to move to new quarters that are farther inland and less susceptible to flooding. The 25 acres (10 ha) for the new zoo facilities were donated by Clyde Weir and his daughter Andrea Weir Franklin. The new facilities were scheduled to open in early 2013. The new zoo reopened on March 11, 2020.

== Gallery ==
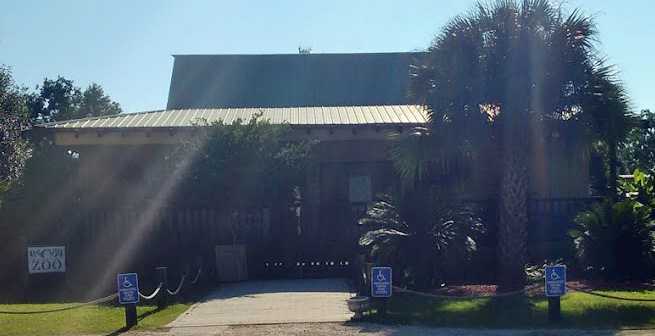
Zoo entrance

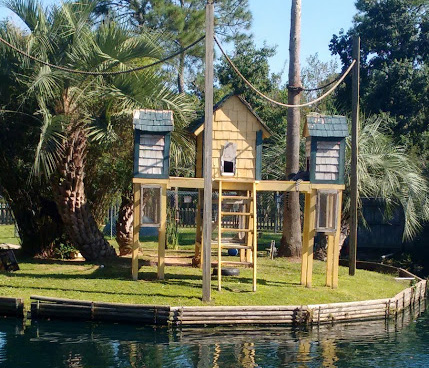
Lemur habitat

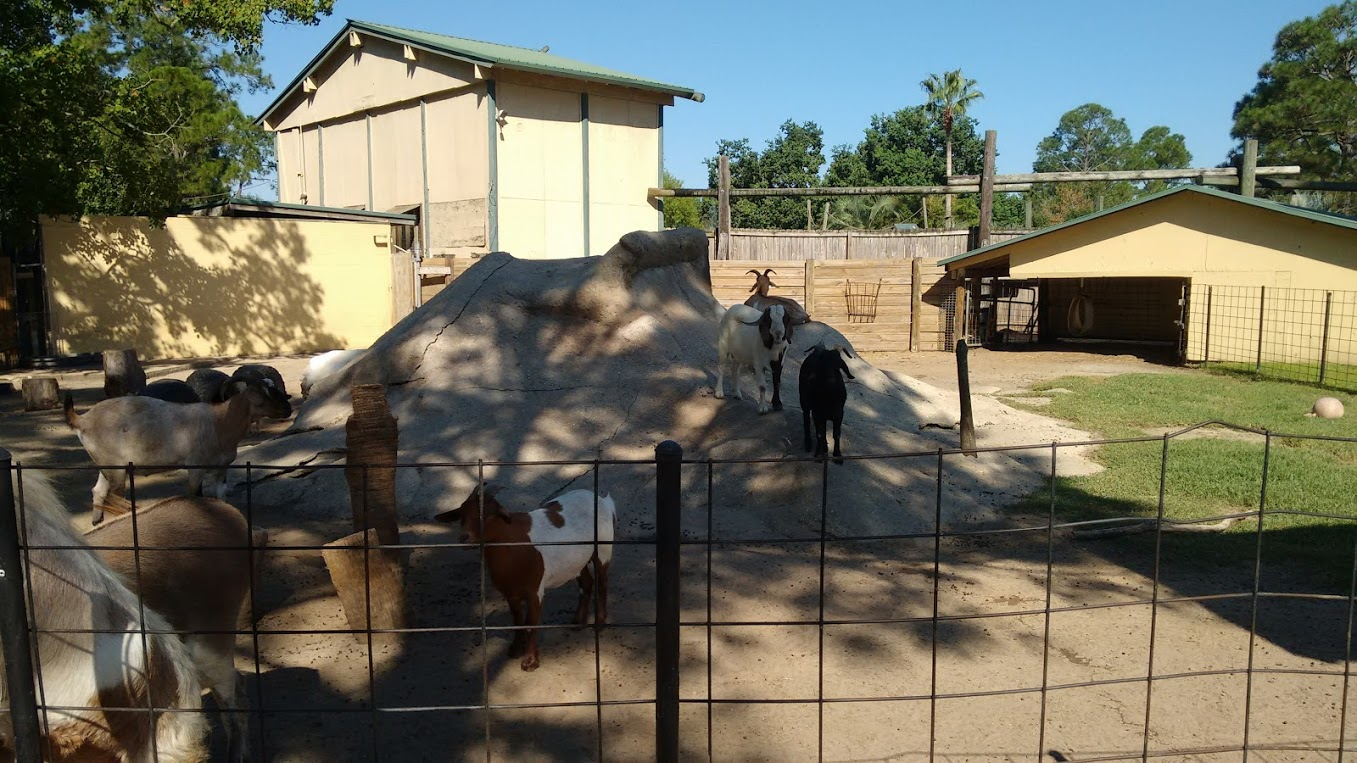
Goat habitat

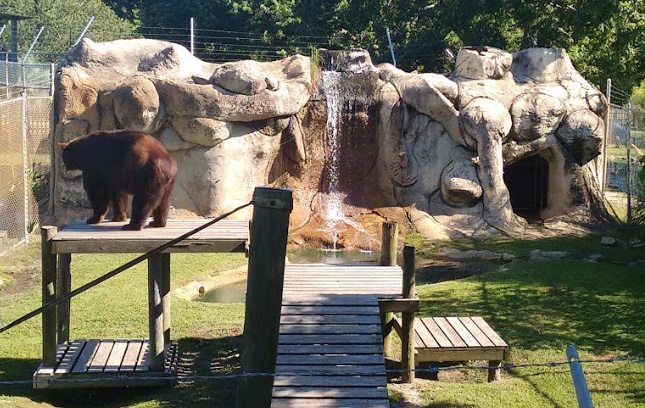
Bear exhibit

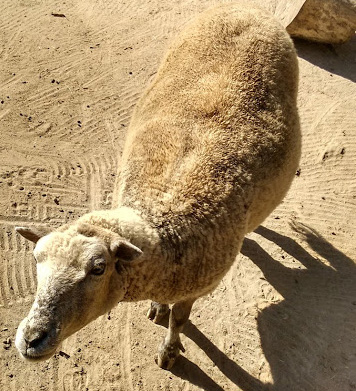
Sheep

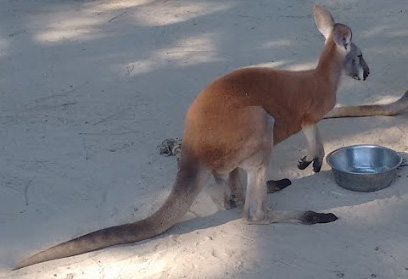
A kangaroo at the zoo
