= Alabama State Route 59 =

State highway in Alabama, United States

State Route 59
- SR 59 highlighted in red

Route information
- Maintained by ALDOT
- Length: 94 mi (151 km)

Major junctions
- South end: SR 182 in Gulf Shores
- US 98 / SR 42 in Foley; US 90 / SR 16 in Robertsdale; I-10 near Loxley; US 31 / SR 3 in Bay Minette; SR 287 in Bay Minette; I-65 near Bay Minette
- North end: SR 21 in Uriah

Location
- Country: United States
- State: Alabama
- Counties: Baldwin, Monroe

Highway system
- Alabama State Highway System; Interstate; US; State
← I-59	→ SR 60

State Route 59 (SR 59) is a 94-mile (151 km) state highway in Baldwin and Monroe counties in the southwestern portion of the U.S. state of Alabama. The highway extends from Gulf Shores on the Gulf of Mexico coast to Uriah in rural southwestern Alabama. The route extends some 80.8 miles (130.0 km) in Baldwin County, by far the longest mileage that any signed highway spends in a single county in Alabama.

== Route description ==
The route begins at a junction with SR 21 in Uriah. It follows the ridgeline of the Mobile Delta to Stockton, where it turns inland. It crosses Interstate 65 (I-65) and continues south before turning onto the Gulf Shores Parkway in Bay Minette. Turning south, it meanders through more rural country before crossing I-10 and entering the Gulf Coastal Lowlands. Before reaching the Intracoastal Waterway, it serves as the main thoroughfare through Loxley, Robertsdale, and Foley. After crossing the Waterway, it serves the city of Gulf Shores before ending at SR 182, under 1/2 mile (0.80 km) from the coast of the Gulf of Mexico.

The route is four or more lanes from its junction with SR 287 (Gulf Shores Parkway) in Bay Minette south to its southern terminus. Even so, the route has some of Alabama's highest state route traffic numbers, with a southbound stretch in Gulf Shores seeing an average of 60,600 cars per day in July 2024.

== Major intersections ==
County	Location	mi	km	Destinations	Notes
Baldwin	Gulf Shores	0.000	0.000	SR 182	Southern terminus
Baldwin	Gulf Shores	1.110	1.786	SR 180 to Foley Beach Express north – toll ferry, State Park Cabins, Fort Morgan, Wildlife Refuge	
Baldwin	Foley	10.921	17.576	US 98 (Laurel Avenue / SR 42) to Foley Beach Express south	
Baldwin		13.995	22.523	Foley Beach Express south – Gulf Shores, Orange Beach, Beaches, Elberta, Lillian	
Baldwin	Robertsdale	20.968	33.745	SR 104 west / CR 83 east – Silverhill	Eastern terminus of SR 104
Baldwin	Robertsdale	22.457	36.141	US 90 east (SR 16) – Pensacola	South end of US 90/SR 16 concurrency
Baldwin	Loxley	27.830	44.788	US 90 west (SR 16) – Mobile	North end of US 90/SR 16 concurrency
Baldwin	Loxley	29.349	47.233	I-10 – Mobile, Pensacola	I-10 exit 44
Baldwin	Stapleton	35.241	56.715	US 31 south (SR 3) – Mobile, Spanish Fort	South end of US 31/SR 3 concurrency
Baldwin	Bay Minette	45.868	73.817	US 31 north (D'Olive Street / SR 3)	North end of US 31/SR 3 concurrency
Baldwin	Bay Minette	48.412	77.912	SR 287 to I-65 – Montgomery, Bay Minette	
Baldwin		52.209	84.022	I-65 – Mobile, Montgomery	I-65 exit 34
Baldwin	Stockton	55.759	89.735	SR 225 south	Northern terminus of SR 225
Monroe	Uriah	93.670	150.747	SR 21 – Frisco City, Atmore, Pensacola	Northern terminus
1.000 mi = 1.609 km; 1.000 km = 0.621 mi: Concurrency terminus
