= Uriah, Alabama =

- Census-designated place
- Location of Uriah in Monroe County, Alabama.
- Coordinates: 31°18′23″N 87°30′07″W
- Country: United States
- State: Alabama
- Counties: Monroe

Area
  - Total: 1.61 sq mi (4.16 km^{2})
  - Land: 1.61 sq mi (4.16 km^{2})
  - Water: 0 sq mi (0.00 km^{2})
- Elevation: 351 ft (107 m)

Population (2020)
  - Total: 263
  - Density: 163.7/sq mi (63.22/km^{2})
- Time zone: UTC-6 (CST)
  - Summer (DST): UTC-5 (CDT)
- ZIP code: 36480
- Area code: 251
- GNIS ID: 2628607
- FIPS code: 01-78120

Uriah (pronounced, in the local English dialect, "you-rye") is a census-designated place and unincorporated community in southern Monroe County, Alabama. Uriah is located at the junction of State Route 21 and State Route 59. As of the 2020 census, its population was 263, down from 294 at the 2010 census.

== History ==
The area was settled around the 1870s after the United States government had forcibly removed a majority of the American Indians to west of the Mississippi River. Anglo-Americans, and other Caucasians with predominantly Creek mixture, settled the area, clearing timber and developing farms.

When Uriah was full of virgin timber it was originally named Maros. The first three families to own property between Jeddo Road (located in Uriah) and the Atmore city limits were the Hollingers, Dees and Lomaxes.

In the 21st century, it continues to be rural, with most people working in agriculture and timber.

== Demographics ==
Historical population
Census	Pop.	Note	%±
2010	294		—
2020	263		−10.5%
U.S. Decennial Census

Uriah was first listed as a census designated place in the 2010 U.S. census.

Uriah CDP, Alabama – Racial and ethnic composition Note: the US Census treats Hispanic/Latino as an ethnic category. This table excludes Latinos from the racial categories and assigns them to a separate category. Hispanics/Latinos may be of any race.
Race / Ethnicity (NH = Non-Hispanic)	Pop 2010	Pop 2020	% 2010	% 2020
White alone (NH)	203	198	69.05%	75.29%
Black or African American alone (NH)	61	41	20.75%	15.59%
Native American or Alaska Native alone (NH)	9	9	3.06%	3.42%
Asian alone (NH)	1	0	0.34%	0.00%
Native Hawaiian or Pacific Islander alone (NH)	0	0	0.00%	0.00%
Other race alone (NH)	0	0	0.00%	0.00%
Mixed race or Multiracial (NH)	14	15	4.76%	5.70%
Hispanic or Latino (any race)	6	0	2.04%	0.00%
Total	294	263	100.00%	100.00%

== Education ==
The local school, J.U. Blacksher, was named after James Uriah Blacksher, one of the founders and a namesake of Uriah. The school houses kindergarten through 12th grade on its campus.

J.U. Blacksher School was established in 1924, and graduated its first class in 1925. The building was a large white frame structure built around an open-air garden, complete with a goldfish pond.

In January 1950, the main building burned down. The gym, cafeteria and vocational buildings remained. For two and a half years, students attended school at the Masonic Lodge and the CCC Camp at Little River State Park. In the fall of 1951, the school was rebuilt on its present site with two new brick buildings for the elementary and high schools. In 1972, a new cafeteria was completed, and in the fall of 1975, the new gym was completed.

In the spring of 2001, a new eight-classroom wing was added to the back of the campus complex. The main administration office was renovated and enlarged. The football stadium was also renovated, receiving new bleachers and a pressbox. Stadium lights were erected on the baseball field, illuminating it for the first time. In 2008, a new elementary wing was added that contained ten new classrooms.

== Church arson ==
In 1997, a group of five local white teenagers were found to have committed arson of a black church and vandalized another in the nearby rural community of Little River, Baldwin County, following a Ku Klux Klan rally. They were later convicted and sentenced to several years in prison. These incidents and the events leading up to them in this rural area were explored by author Paul Hemphill in his book The Ballad of Little River: A Tale of Race and Restless Youth in the Rural South, (2000).

== Culture ==
Uriah is home to an annual festival called The Cotton Patch Festival. Various talents and arts and crafts are showcased during the festival.

== Notable people ==
- Carl Madison, former American football coach
- Lambert C. Mims, four-term public works commissioner and former mayor of Mobile
