= Elberta, Alabama =

- Town
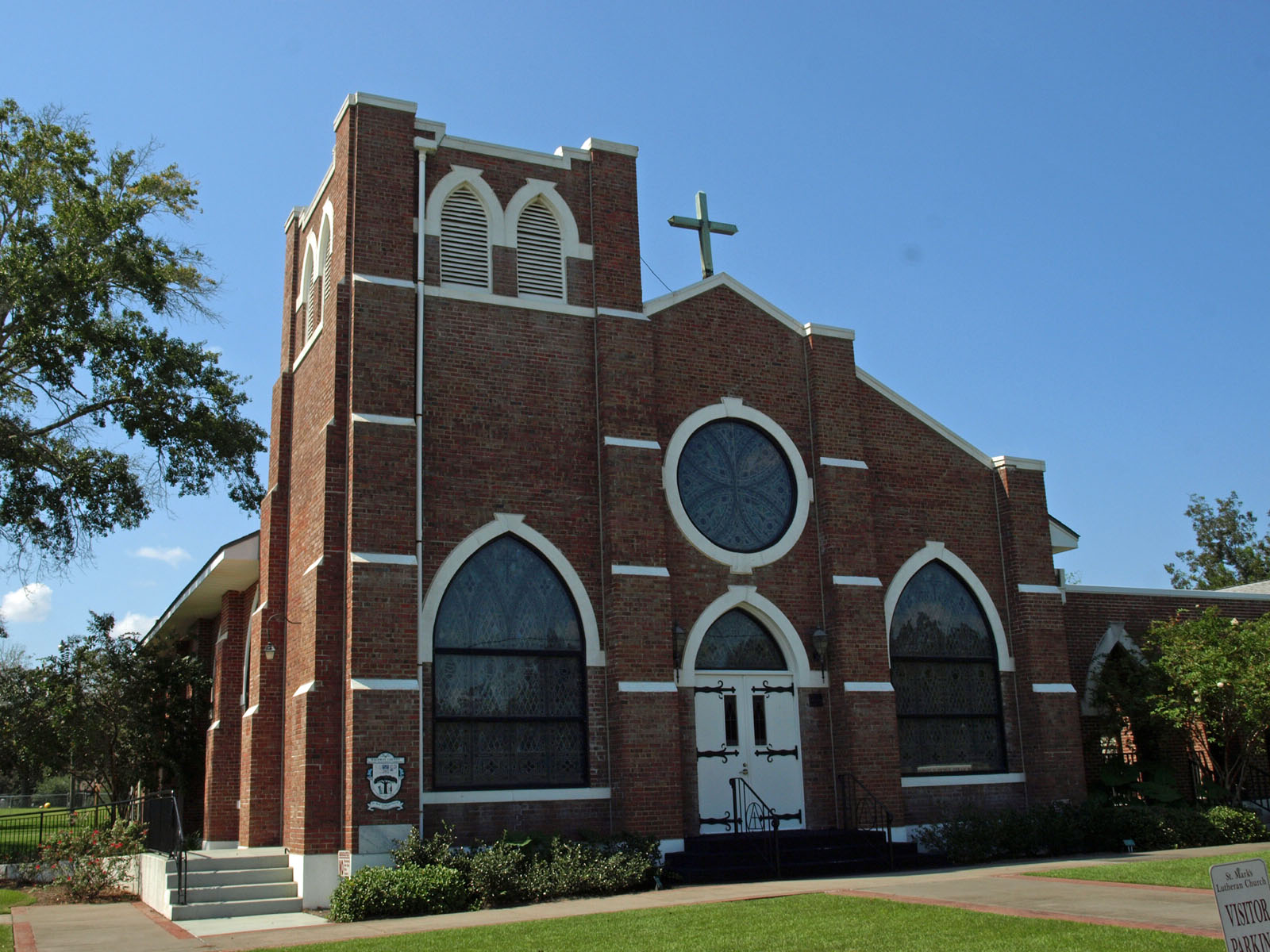
- St. Mark's Lutheran Church (Elberta, Alabama)

- Logo

- Location of Elberta in Baldwin County, Alabama.
- Coordinates: 30°22′15″N 87°35′56″W
- Country: United States
- State: Alabama
- County: Baldwin

Area
  - Total: 7.08 sq mi (18.33 km^{2})
  - Land: 6.98 sq mi (18.07 km^{2})
  - Water: 0.10 sq mi (0.26 km^{2})
- Elevation: 3 ft (0.91 m)

Population (2020)
  - Total: 1,974
  - Density: 282.9/sq mi (109.24/km^{2})
- Time zone: UTC-6 (Central (CST))
  - Summer (DST): UTC-5 (CDT)
- ZIP code: 36530
- Area code: 251
- FIPS code: 01-23320
- GNIS feature ID: 2406430
- Website: townofelberta.com

Elberta is a town in Baldwin County, Alabama, United States. At the 2020 census the population was 1,974. It is part of the Daphne-Fairhope-Foley metropolitan area.

== Geography ==
Elberta is located in southern Baldwin County. U.S. Route 98 (State Avenue) passes through the center of the town, leading west 5 miles (8 km) to Foley and east 10 miles (16 km) to Lillian, at the Florida border.

According to the U.S. Census Bureau, the town has a total area of 6.9 square miles (17.8 km^{2}), of which 6.8 square miles (17.5 km^{2}) is land and 0.12 square miles (0.3 km^{2}), or 1.47%, is water.

== Demographics ==
Historical population
Census	Pop.	Note	%±
1960	384		—
1970	395		2.9%
1980	491		24.3%
1990	458		−6.7%
2000	552		20.5%
2010	1,498		171.4%
2020	1,974		31.8%
U.S. Decennial Census; 2013 Estimate

=== 2020 census ===
As of the 2020 census, Elberta had a population of 1,974. The median age was 43.2 years. 21.7% of residents were under the age of 18 and 20.7% of residents were 65 years of age or older. For every 100 females there were 94.5 males, and for every 100 females age 18 and over there were 88.1 males age 18 and over. There were 413 families residing in the town.

45.1% of residents lived in urban areas, while 54.9% lived in rural areas.

There were 860 households in Elberta, of which 27.9% had children under the age of 18 living in them. Of all households, 38.8% were married-couple households, 23.7% were households with a male householder and no spouse or partner present, and 30.2% were households with a female householder and no spouse or partner present. About 32.6% of all households were made up of individuals and 12.8% had someone living alone who was 65 years of age or older.

There were 1,064 housing units, of which 19.2% were vacant. The homeowner vacancy rate was 2.8% and the rental vacancy rate was 6.3%.

Elberta racial composition
Race	Num.	Perc.
White (non-Hispanic)	1,720	87.13%
Black or African American (non-Hispanic)	33	1.67%
Native American	10	0.51%
Asian	1	0.05%
Pacific Islander	4	0.2%
Other/Mixed	120	6.08%
Hispanic or Latino	86	4.36%

=== 2010 census ===
As of the census of 2010, there were 1,498 people, 653 households, and 416 families residing in the town. The population density was 222 inhabitants per square mile (86/km^{2}). There were 982 housing units at an average density of 142.3 per square mile (54.9/km^{2}). The racial makeup of the town was 92.9% White, 1.4% Black or African American, 0.3% Native American, 0.1% Pacific Islander, 0.8% Asian, 2.5% from other races, and 2.0% from two or more races. 5.3% of the population were Hispanic or Latino of any race.

There were 653 households, out of which 23.4% had children under the age of 18 living with them, 46.7% were married couples living together, 13.2% had a female householder with no husband present, and 36.3% were non-families. 29.2% of all households were made up of individuals, and 13.3% had someone living alone who was 65 years of age or older. The average household size was 2.29 and the average family size was 2.80.

In the town, the population was spread out, with 21.2% under the age of 18, 6.3% from 18 to 24, 23.8% from 25 to 44, 28.5% from 45 to 64, and 20.2% who were 65 years of age or older. The median age was 43.7 years. For every 100 females, there were 101.6 males. For every 100 females age 18 and over, there were 92.5 males.

The median income for a household in the town was $30,161, and the median income for a family was $31,964. Males had a median income of $29,575 versus $27,971 for females. The per capita income for the town was $17,027. About 12.3% of families and 18.5% of the population were below the poverty line, including 40.9% of those under age 18 and 5.7% of those age 65 or over.

== Education ==
Elberta is a part of the Baldwin County Public Schools system.

Elberta has two public schools, which are Elberta Elementary School (K-6) and Elberta High School (7-12). In addition, there is one private school in Elberta; Saint Benedict's Catholic School. The school was founded in 1921 and serves the six surrounding parishes of: St. Bartholomew, Elberta, St. Margaret of Scotland, Foley, St. Joseph, Lillian, Our Lady of the Gulf, Gulf Shores, and St. Thomas by the Sea, Orange Beach. Elberta High School opened to grade nine as of August 2017 and had its first graduating class in 2021.

== History ==
Elberta was founded in the early 20th century by a Chicago-based land company. The Baldwin County Colonization Company was organized in 1903, and the first settlers arrived in 1904. The community was founded by farmers who had immigrated from Germany to the Midwest of America. The land company advertised the area as having rich soil and a climate that allowed year-round farming. The first two organized churches were Lutheran (1908) and Catholic (1905).

The land company laid out Baldwin County in the manner found in the Midwest; that is to say, roads were laid out on section lines that were due north-south and east-west. Property, especially farms, were laid out in squares. With the immigration taking these farmers through Ohio, Indiana, Illinois, and other Midwestern states, the early years of the community resembled Midwestern farming communities more than those of the Deep South. In the 1930s through the 1940s, the town boasted a farmer's hall where dancing and singing were enjoyed, a hotel, and a movie theatre, as well as a butcher shop, grocery and drug store. Many of the residents spoke German, and St. Mark's Lutheran Church offered German-language services until 1976.

The State Bank of Elberta was incorporated in 1922. The bank was unusual in that it did not close during the Great Depression.

The town was incorporated by vote on December 9, 1952.

To support the town's volunteer fire department, the Elberta German Sausage Festival was started in the mid-1970s. This event is held the last weekend of March and the last weekend of October and features polka music, Elberta German Sausage, and 250 arts and crafts vendors. In 2014, the October festival saw an estimated 40,000 visitors.

The town is the home of the Baldwin County Heritage Museum. The museum is located on U.S. Highway 98 east of the town. It features exhibits devoted to the development of Baldwin County. The museum includes a large amount of farm equipment and exhibits of life in farm homes. The old St. Mark's Lutheran Church building was moved to the grounds and restored.
