= Lillian, Alabama =

- Unincorporated community Census-designated place
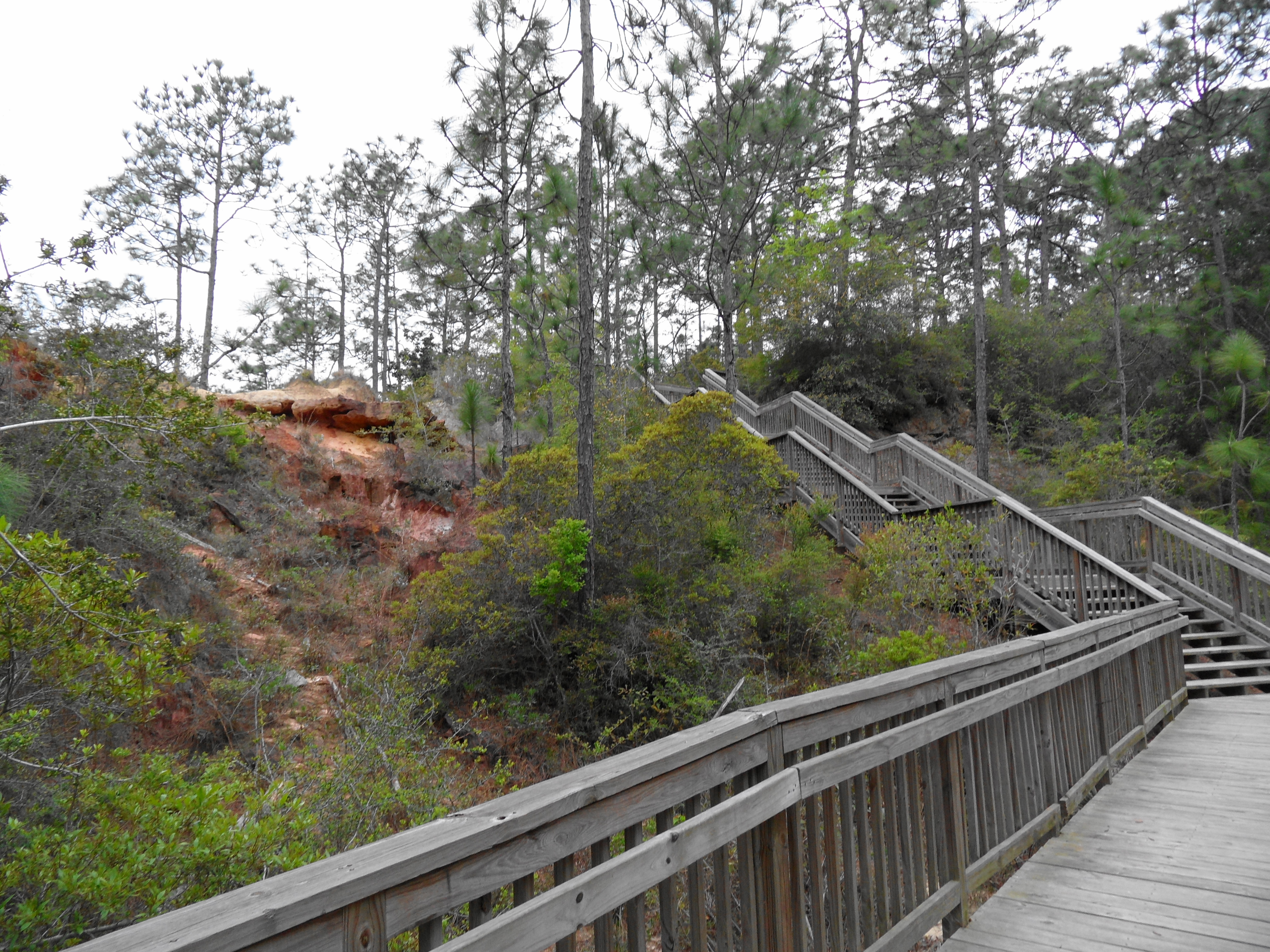
- County park at Lillian, Alabama

- Location of Lillian in Baldwin County, Alabama.
- Coordinates: 30°26′44″N 87°25′51″W
- Country: United States
- State: Alabama
- County: Baldwin

Area
  - Total: 3.53 sq mi (9.14 km^{2})
  - Land: 1.91 sq mi (4.94 km^{2})
  - Water: 1.62 sq mi (4.20 km^{2})
- Elevation: 3 ft (0.91 m)

Population (2020)
  - Total: 1,330
  - Density: 696.6/sq mi (268.96/km^{2})
- Time zone: UTC-6 (Central (CST))
  - Summer (DST): UTC-5 (CDT)
- ZIP code: 36549
- Area code: 251
- FIPS code: 01-42928
- GNIS feature ID: 2633315

Lillian is an unincorporated community and census-designated place in eastern Baldwin County, Alabama, United States. As of the 2020 census, Lillian had a population of 1,330. Lillian is located on U.S. Route 98 on the western shore of Perdido Bay, 9.5 miles (15.3 km) east of Elberta. Its eastern edge lies on the Alabama/Florida state line.

== History ==
The community was named for Lillian Kee (1889-1972), the daughter of William Thomas Kee, postmaster. In 1630, the King of Spain gave land grants to the Suarez family that included the current site of Lillian. Francisco Suarez operated a ferry near the modern site of Lillian. After the United States took control of Mobile during the War of 1812, a stockade fort was constructed in the area. This fort was eventually burned by Spanish forces a few months later. The Baldwin Colonization Company purchased the area around Lillian in 1923 to promote the area as a resort location. Lillian was once home to a school and hotel. The hotel was originally located in Elberta then dismantled and moved to Lillian.

The Lillian post office was established in 1884.

The Perdido Bay Bridge, which spans Perdido Bay from Lillian to Florida, was first constructed in 1916. The bridge replaced a ferry that operated between Alabama and Florida. The original bridge was operated by the Perdido Bay Bridge and Ferry Company, but ownership was transferred to the states of Alabama and Florida when a second bridge was completed in 1930. The bridge was originally operated as a toll bridge, but tolls were discontinued in 1943. The current bridge was completed in 1980.

The Old Spanish Cemetery in Lillian includes burials from as early as the 16th century.

The Lillian Swamp is managed as a nature preserve as part of the Forever Wild Land Trust. The swamp is also listed as an Alabama Gulf Ecological Management Site due to its importance as an estuarine habitat and stopover for migratory birds.

== Demographics ==
Historical population
| Census | Pop. | Note | %± |
|---|---|---|---|
| 2020 | 1,330 | | — |
U.S. Decennial Census

Lillian was first listed as a census designated place in the 2020 U.S. census.

=== 2020 census ===
As of the 2020 census, Lillian had a population of 1,330. The median age was 56.7 years. 16.0% of residents were under the age of 18 and 32.9% of residents were 65 years of age or older. For every 100 females there were 95.9 males, and for every 100 females age 18 and over there were 94.6 males age 18 and over.

90.2% of residents lived in urban areas, while 9.8% lived in rural areas.

There were 568 households in Lillian, of which 18.1% had children under the age of 18 living in them. Of all households, 50.7% were married-couple households, 21.5% were households with a male householder and no spouse or partner present, and 23.9% were households with a female householder and no spouse or partner present. About 34.1% of all households were made up of individuals and 20.4% had someone living alone who was 65 years of age or older.

There were 668 housing units, of which 15.0% were vacant. The homeowner vacancy rate was 2.6% and the rental vacancy rate was 7.9%.

Lillian CDP, Alabama – Racial and ethnic composition Note: the US Census treats Hispanic/Latino as an ethnic category. This table excludes Latinos from the racial categories and assigns them to a separate category. Hispanics/Latinos may be of any race.
| Race / Ethnicity (NH = Non-Hispanic) | Pop 2020 | 2020 |
|---|---|---|
| White alone (NH) | 1,181 | 88.80% |
| Black or African American alone (NH) | 17 | 1.28% |
| Native American or Alaska Native alone (NH) | 12 | 0.90% |
| Asian alone (NH) | 8 | 0.60% |
| Native Hawaiian or Pacific Islander alone (NH) | 1 | 0.08% |
| Other race alone (NH) | 0 | 0.00% |
| Mixed race or Multiracial (NH) | 78 | 5.86% |
| Hispanic or Latino (any race) | 33 | 2.48% |
| Total | 1,330 | 100.00% |

=== Education ===
The school district is Baldwin County Public Schools.
