= Interstate 10 in Alabama =

Interstate Highway in Alabama

Interstate 10
- I-10 highlighted in red

Route information
- Maintained by ALDOT
- Length: 66.269 mi (106.650 km)
- NHS: Entire route

Major junctions
- West end: I-10 at the Mississippi state line near Grand Bay
- US 90 near Tillmans Corner; I-65 in Mobile; US 90 / US 98 in Daphne
- East end: I-10 at the Florida state line near Robertsdale

Location
- Country: United States
- State: Alabama
- Counties: Mobile, Baldwin

Highway system
- Interstate Highway System; Main; Auxiliary; Suffixed; Business; Future; Alabama State Highway System; Interstate; US; State
← SR 9	→ SR 10

Interstate 10 (I-10) is a part of the Interstate Highway System that runs from Santa Monica, California, to Jacksonville, Florida. In Alabama, the Interstate Highway runs 66.269 miles (106.650 km) from the Mississippi state line near Grand Bay east to the Florida state line at the Perdido River. I-10 is the primary east–west highway of the Gulf Coast region of Alabama. The highway connects Mobile, the largest city in South Alabama, with Pascagoula, Mississippi, to the west and Pensacola, Florida, to the east. Within the state, the highway connects Mobile and Mobile County with the Baldwin County communities of Daphne and Fairhope. I-10 connects Mobile and Baldwin County by crossing the northern end of Mobile Bay and the southern end of the Mobile-Tensaw River Delta via the George Wallace Tunnel in Mobile and the Jubilee Parkway viaduct system between Mobile and Daphne.

== Route description ==
I-10 enters Mobile County from Jackson County, Mississippi, near just north of where US Route 90 (US 90) crosses the state line near Grand Bay. The four-lane freeway has an eastbound welcome center ahead of its first interchange, a diamond interchange with the western end of State Route 188 (SR 188) due north of the center of Grand Bay. I-10 continues east-northeast through a partial cloverleaf interchange with County Road 39 (CR 39) north of Irvington. The highway crosses the Fowl River and curves more northeast through a diamond interchange with CR 30 (Theodore Dawes Road) west of the community of Theodore. I-10 expands to six lanes ahead of a pair of interchanges near Tillmans Corner: a partial cloverleaf interchange with US 90 (Government Boulevard) and a full cloverleaf interchange with SR 193 (Rangeline Road).

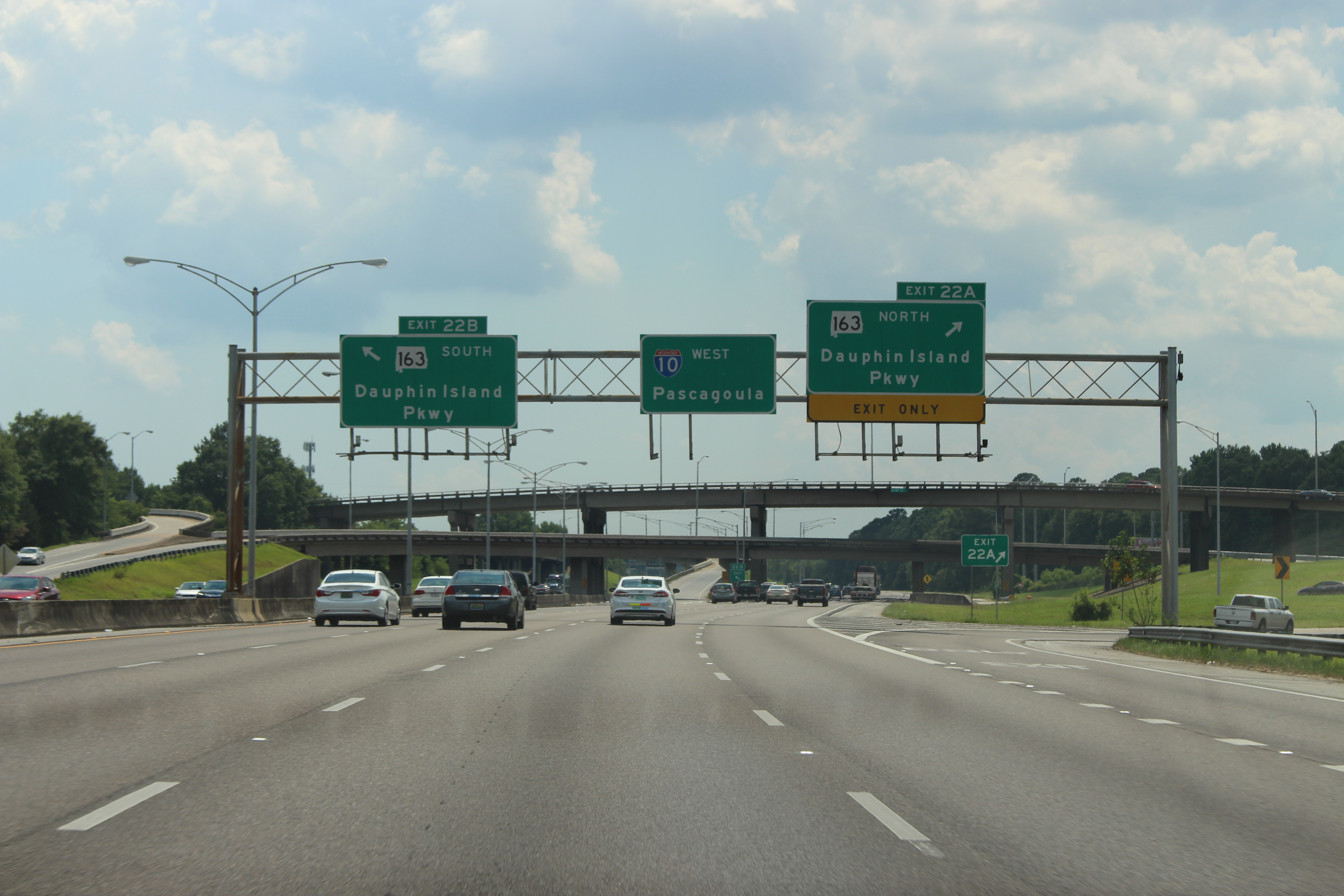
I-10 at Dauphin Island Parkway

I-10 enters the city of Mobile at Halls Mill Creek just east of SR 193. The highway has a directional-T interchange with the southern end of I-65, which serves Montgomery and Birmingham. I-10 continues northeast from I-65 as an eight-lane freeway that parallels CSX's NO&M Subdivision rail line. The highway has a complex interchange with SR 163 (Dauphin Island Parkway) just east of the Dog River; the interchange includes a flyover from southbound SR 163 to eastbound I-10 and a left-ramp flyover from westbound I-10 to southbound SR 163. I-10 and the railroad form the northern margin of Mobile Aeroplex at Brookley (formerly Brookley Air Force Base), along which the freeway has a partial cloverleaf interchange with Michigan Avenue. North of the airport, the interstate has a pair of half-diamond interchanges with Duval Street and Broad Street; the half-interchanges are connected by a one-way pair of frontage roads.

I-10 crosses over a Canadian National Railway/Illinois Central Railroad rail line and leaves the CSX rail line as it curves north toward downtown Mobile. The freeway has a four-ramp partial cloverleaf junction with Virginia Street and a pair of half-diamond interchanges with Texas Street (southbound exit, northbound entrance) and Canal Street (northbound exit, southbound exit). North of Canal Street, I-10 has a directional-T interchange with Water Street, which provides access to downtown Mobile. Within that interchange, the freeway reduces to four lanes and curves east and descends into the George Wallace Tunnel to pass under the Mobile River. I-10 resurfaces on Blakeley Island and has an interchange with US 90 and US 98 (Battleship Parkway) west of Battleship Memorial Park.

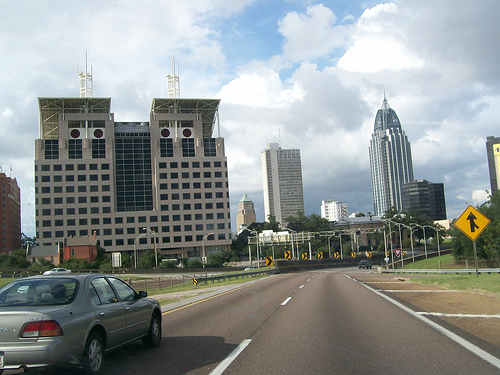
I-10 eastbound in downtown Mobile approaching the George Wallace Tunnel

I-10 leaves Blakeley Island, the city of Mobile, and Mobile County on Jubilee Parkway, a dual-viaduct crossing of several rivers at the northern end of Mobile Bay. The first major segment is a crossing of Polecat Bay, and the confluence of the Spanish River and the Tensaw River, within which the interstate enters Baldwin County. The viaduct continues through a cut in an island, then continues across Chacaloochee Bay, within which the freeway has a diamond interchange with US 90 and US 98 (Battleship Parkway), which mostly follow causeways across the great expanse of water. Beyond the interchange, I-10 continues across the bay and the mouth of the Apalachee River, Bay John, the mouth of the Blakeley River, and D'Olive Bay. The dual viaducts reach the eastern shore just west of a five-ramp partial cloverleaf interchange with US 90 and US 98 south of the center of Spanish Fort and north of Fairhope.

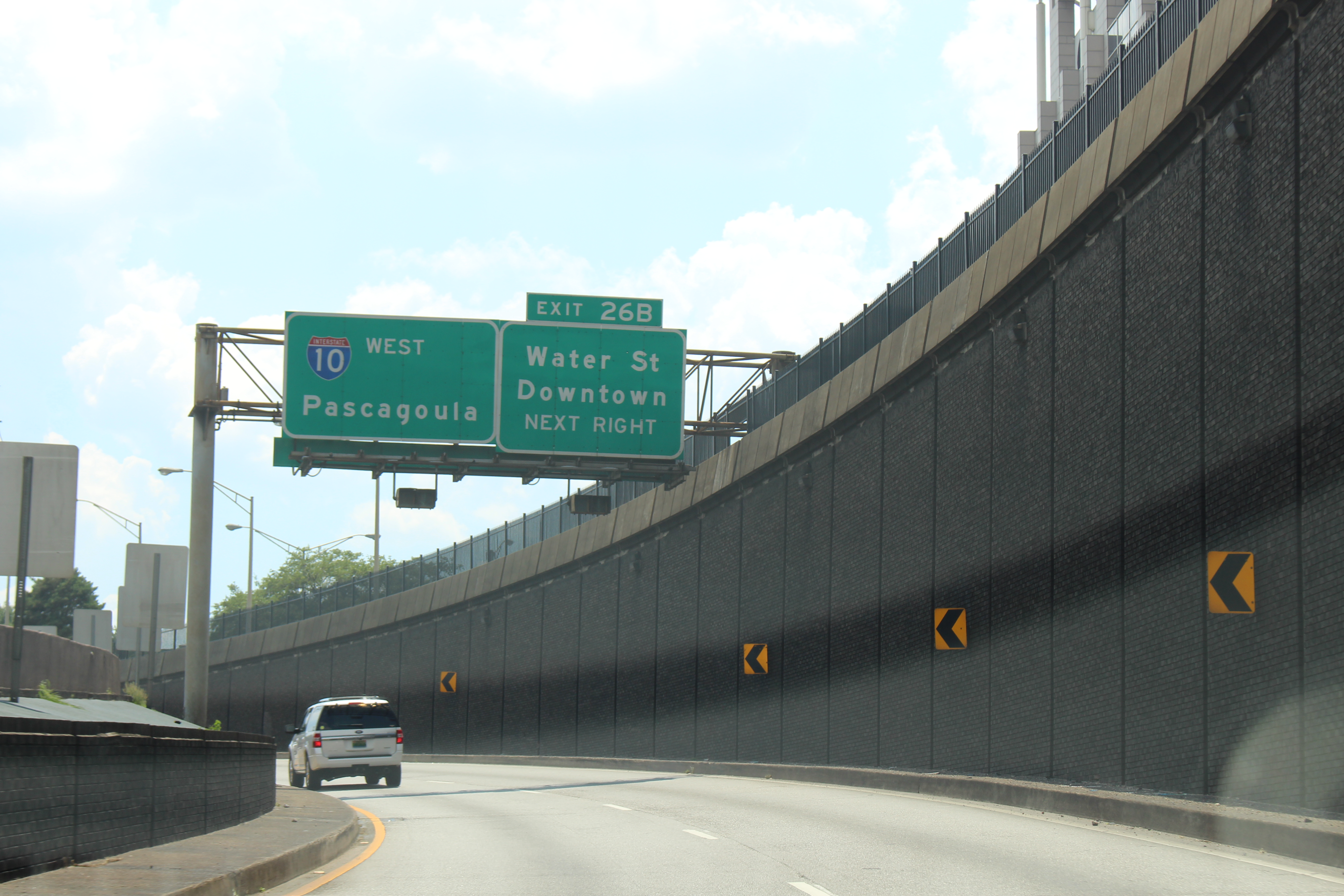
I-10 westbound coming out of the George Wallace Tunnel

I-10 continues east as a four-lane freeway along the northern edge of the city of Daphne. The freeway has a diverging diamond interchange with SR 181 (Malbis Plantation Parkway) in the northeastern corner of the city near the hamlet of Malbis. I-10 has a four-ramp partial cloverleaf interchange with SR 59 on the northern edge of Loxley. The interstate crosses the Fish River and has a diamond interchange with the Baldwin Beach Express, a new county highway that connects I-10 with the beach communities of Gulf Shores and Orange Beach. I-10 has one more interchange in Alabama, a diamond interchange with CR 64 (Wilcox Road). Beyond CR 64, the freeway parallels and then crosses the Styx River, then the westbound highway has a welcome center just west of the Perdido River, where I-10 leaves Alabama and enters Escambia County, Florida, and Pensacola.

== Exit list ==
County	Location	mi	km	Exit	Destinations	Notes
Mobile	Grand Bay	0.000	0.000		I-10 west – Pascagoula	Continuation into Mississippi
Mobile	Grand Bay	4.151	6.680	4	SR 188 east (Grand Bay Wilmer Road) – Grand Bay	
Mobile	Irvington	10.380	16.705	10	CR 39 – Bayou La Batre, Dawes	
Mobile	Theodore	13.090	21.066	13	CR 30 (Theodore Dawes Road) – Theodore, Dawes	
Mobile	Tillmans Corner	15.690	25.251	15	US 90 (Government Boulevard) – Tillmans Corner, Theodore	Signed as exits 15A (west) and 15B (east)
Mobile	Tillmans Corner	17.124	27.558	17	SR 193 (Rangeline Road) – Dauphin Island, Tillmans Corner	Signed as exits 17A (south) and 17B (north)
Mobile	Mobile	20.081	32.317	20	I-65 north – Montgomery, Birmingham, Huntsville	Directional-T interchange; southern terminus of I-65; left exit and entrance eastbound; I-65 exit 0
Mobile	Mobile	22.221	35.761	22	SR 163 (Dauphin Island Parkway)	Signed as exits 22A (north) and 22B (south) westbound
Mobile	Mobile	23.301	37.499	23	Michigan Avenue	
Mobile	Mobile	23.951– 24.571	38.545– 39.543	24	Duval Street, Broad Street	Pair of half-diamond interchanges with connecting frontage roads
Mobile	Mobile	25.551	41.120	25	Virginia Street	Marked as exit 25B westbound
Mobile	Mobile	25.821	41.555	25A	Texas Street	Westbound exit and eastbound entrance
Mobile	Mobile	26.431	42.537	26A	Canal Street	Eastbound exit and westbound entrance
Mobile	Mobile	26.601	42.810	26B	Water Street to I-165 – Downtown	Eastbound entrance removed 2017
Mobile	Mobile	26.983	43.425	George Wallace Tunnel under the Mobile River		
Mobile	Mobile	27.662	44.518	27	US 90 / US 98 east (Battleship Parkway) – Battleship Park US 90 west (US 98 Truck west) / US 98 west (Government Street)	Eastbound signage; no eastbound entrance from US 90/US 98 Westbound signage
Spanish River		27.662	44.518	West end of Jubilee Parkway		
Baldwin	Spanish Fort	30.220	48.634	30	US 90 / US 98 (Battleship Parkway) – Battleship Park	
Baldwin	Mobile Bay	34.662	55.783	Eastern end of Jubilee Parkway		
Baldwin	Daphne	35.129	56.535	35	US 90 / US 98 – Daphne, Fairhope, Spanish Fort	Signed as exits 35A (US 98) and 35B (US 90) eastbound
Baldwin	Daphne	38.720	62.314	38	SR 181 (Malbis Plantation Parkway) – Daphne, Spanish Fort	
Baldwin	Loxley	44.278	71.259	44	SR 59 – Loxley, Bay Minette, Foley, Gulf Shores, Orange Beach	
Baldwin	Robertsdale	49.550	79.743	49	Baldwin Beach Express (CR 68) – Gulf Shores, Orange Beach	
Baldwin	Robertsdale	53.114	85.479	53	CR 64 (Wilcox Road)	
Perdido River		66.269	106.650	Alabama–Florida line		
Perdido River		66.269	106.650		I-10 east (SR 8) – Pensacola	Continuation into Florida
1.000 mi = 1.609 km; 1.000 km = 0.621 mi: Incomplete access

== See also ==
Interstate 10
Previous state: Mississippi	Alabama	Next state: Florida
