= Gulf State Park =

State park in Alabama, United States

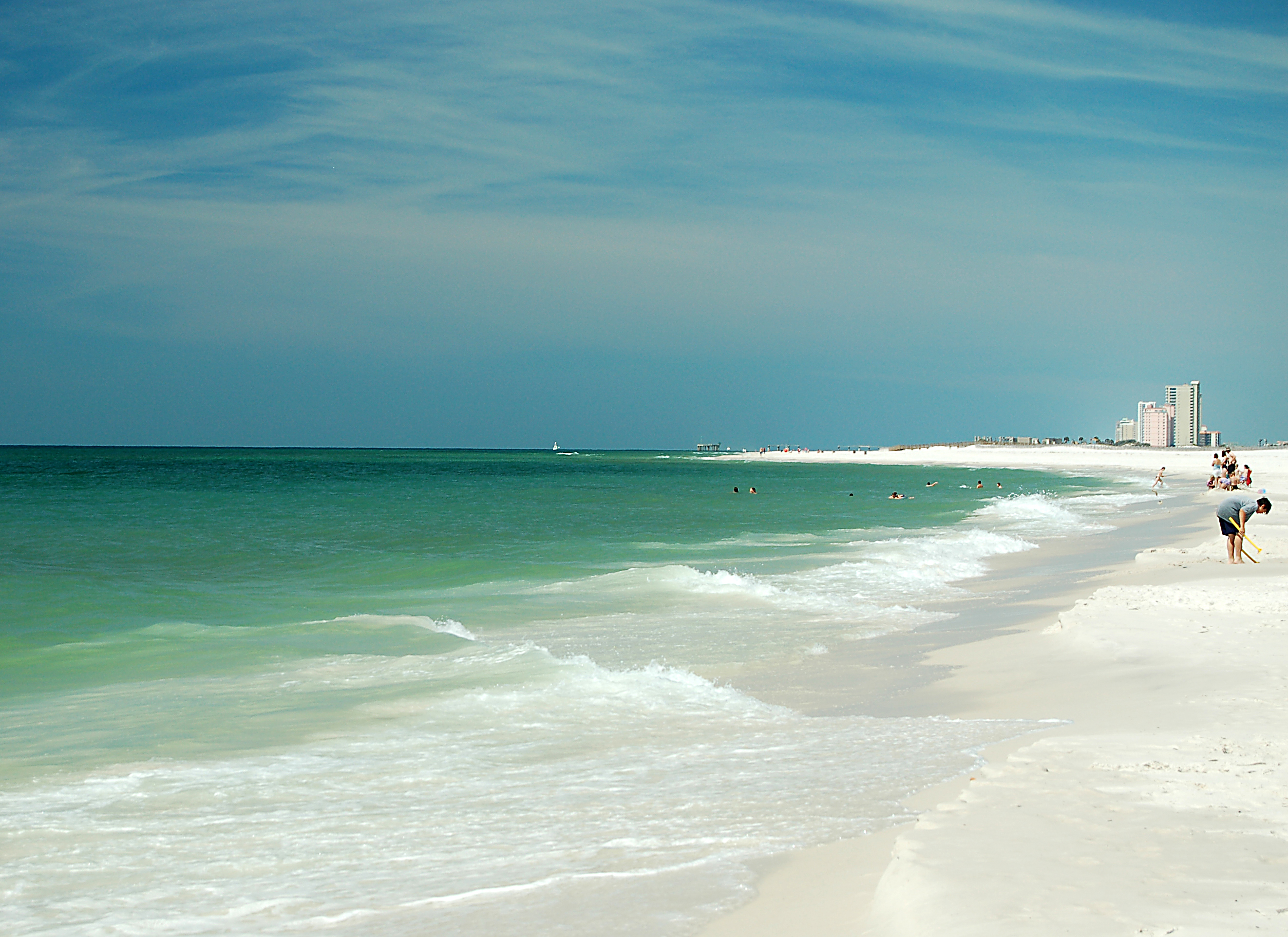
- Westward beach vista at Gulf State Park

- Location within Alabama
- Location: Gulf Shores, Alabama, United States
- Coordinates: 30°15′37″N 87°39′48″W
- Area: 6,150 acres (2,490 ha)
- Elevation: 0 ft (0 m)
- Established: 1939
- Administrator: Alabama Department of Conservation and Natural Resources
- Website: Official website

Gulf State Park is a public recreation area on the Gulf of Mexico in the city of Gulf Shores in southern Baldwin County, Alabama. The state park's 6,150 acres (2,490 ha) mostly encompass the land behind the Gulf Shores beach community, between Highway 59 and SH 161, with the west end extending further south to a wide beach area. In addition to beaches, the park includes marshland, boggy tea-colored streams, pine forests, and three spring-fed, fresh-water lakes: Lake Shelby (750 acres or 300 hectares), Middle Lake, and Little Lake. The park is managed by the Alabama Department of Conservation and Natural Resources, with park enforcement rangers providing around-the-clock security and enforcing anti-littering regulations.

== History ==
The park's facilities, including cabins and a casino, were built in the 1930s by members of the Civilian Conservation Corps working under the auspices of the Federal government. The park opened in 1939 after ownership of the property was transferred to the state.

After weathering multiple hurricanes, the park was devastated by Hurricane Ivan in 2004. Major projects undertaken in the wake of the storm saw the construction of a 1,540-foot (470 m) Gulf of Mexico fishing pier that provides 2,448 feet of fishing space, a 5,000-square-foot swimming pool and splash pad, an interactive nature center, a beach pavilion, and renovation of the campground.

The park's concessionaire-operated zip-line course was closed in 2016. The park's 18-hole golf course was closed permanently in 2018. The fishing pier suffered major damage from Hurricane Sally in 2020; the pier was reopened in August 2024.

Lodge

In 2014, the state announced plans to spend $85 million to further renovate the park. The plans included a $56 million lodge and meeting space to replace the lodge destroyed by Hurricane Ivan. The plans were criticized on grounds that money for the project would come from Deepwater Horizon recovery funds which, critics say, should be used for continued cleanup and improvement of the coastal areas. In October 2014, a lawsuit was filed by the Gulf Restoration Network to block use of the funds for the construction of the lodge. State officials said critics misunderstand the plans. The new facility, called The Lodge at Gulf State Park, opened in 2018.

== Awards ==
In 2020, Gulf State Park was one of eleven Alabama state parks awarded Tripadvisor’s Traveler’s Choice Award, which recognizes businesses and attractions that earn consistently high user reviews. The park has been inducted into the TripAdvisor Hall of Fame for winning its Certificate of Excellence five years in a row.

== Activities and amenities ==
The park includes 2.5 miles (4.0 km) of white sand beaches, a modern campground, and nature trails, both fresh and saltwater fishing and swimming, a lodge and cottages plus campsites for both RVs and tents.
