= Loxley, Alabama =

- City
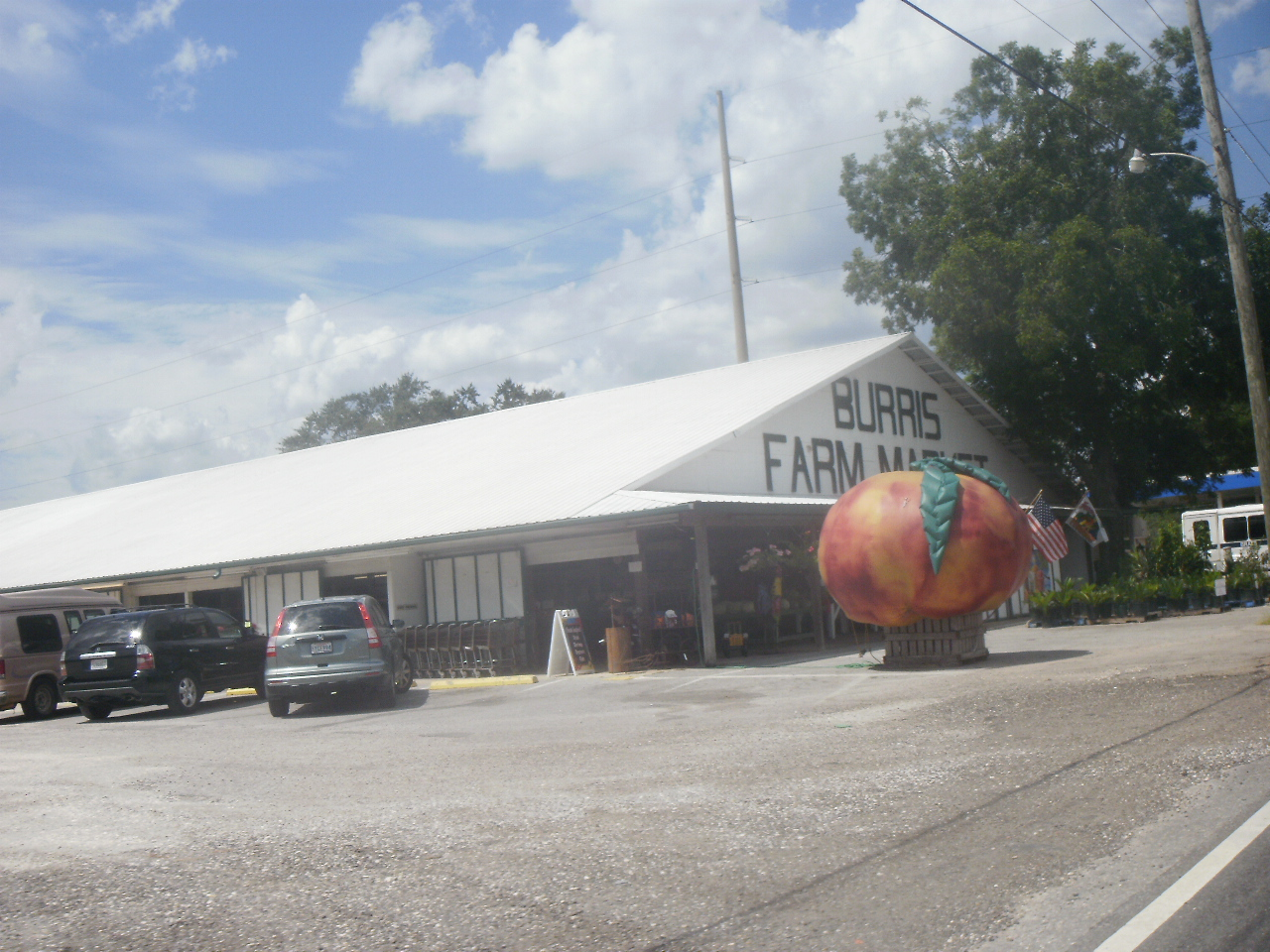
- Burris Farm Market located in Loxley

- Flag Seal
- Motto: "Biggest Little Town in Baldwin"
- Location of Loxley in Baldwin County, Alabama.
- Coordinates: 30°38′25″N 87°45′30″W
- Country: United States
- State: Alabama
- County: Baldwin
- Founded: 1904
- Incorporated: 1957

Government
  - Type: City Council and Mayor

Area
  - Total: 32.25 sq mi (83.54 km^{2})
  - Land: 31.87 sq mi (82.55 km^{2})
  - Water: 0.38 sq mi (0.99 km^{2})
- Elevation: 167 ft (51 m)

Population (2020)
  - Total: 3,710
  - Density: 116.4/sq mi (44.94/km^{2})
- Time zone: UTC-6 (Central (CST))
  - Summer (DST): UTC-5 (CDT)
- ZIP code: 36551
- Area code: 251
- FIPS code: 01-44608
- GNIS feature ID: 2406055
- Website: www.cityofloxley.com

Loxley is a city in Baldwin County, Alabama, United States. As of the 2020 census, the population of the town was 3,710. It is part of the Daphne-Fairhope-Foley metropolitan area. Loxley is becoming a popular location for the expansion of the suburbs from Daphne and Spanish Fort, Alabama, because it is served by an Interstate 10 exit and is almost directly between the cities of Mobile, Alabama, and Pensacola, Florida.

== History ==
=== 19th century ===
In 1870, a man from Chicago by the name of John Loxley established a lumber camp in the area previously known as Bennet. The lumber camp included a commissary and saw mill. The men that traveled with Loxley settled in what later became the town of Loxley. John Loxley returned to Chicago when the lumber was exhausted.

=== 20th century ===
The train depot opened on May 5, 1906, on the Fort Morgan Line. Before that, there were only wagon roads to Bay Minette. Also in 1906, the Loxley post office was opened by Octavia Sauer. She served as the postmistress and depot agent. By 1920, the businesses in Loxley consisted of an egg store, grocery store, two general merchandise stores, train depot, drug store, telegraph office, land office, repair garage, post office, bank, hotel, butcher shop, orange packing shed, cement block plant, a blacksmith, a feed and lumber store. A grammar school was built in 1925.

The Town of Loxley incorporated in March 1957.

== Geography ==
Loxley is located in south-central Baldwin County at 30°37'24.600" North, 87°45'17.035" West (30.623500, -87.754732). U.S. Route 90 (Hickory Street) passes through the center of the town, leading eastbound 5 miles (8 km) to Robertsdale, Alabama, and 39 miles (63 km) to Pensacola, Florida, and westbound 11 miles (18 km) to Spanish Fort and 20 miles (32 km) to Mobile. Interstate 10 passes through the northern end of town, with access via Exit 44 (Alabama State Route 59).

According to the U.S. Census Bureau, the town has a total area of 32.2 square miles (83.4 km^{2}), of which 31.9 square miles (82.5 km^{2}) is land and 0.39 square miles (1.0 km^{2}), or 1.15%, is water.

== Demographics ==
Historical population
Census	Pop.	Note	%±
1960	831		—
1970	859		3.4%
1980	804		−6.4%
1990	1,161		44.4%
2000	1,348		16.1%
2010	1,632		21.1%
2020	3,710		127.3%
2025 (est.)	6,131	▲	65.3%
U.S. Decennial Census; 2013 Estimate

=== 2020 census ===
Loxley racial composition
Race	Num.	Perc.
White (non-Hispanic)	2,751	74.15%
Black or African American (non-Hispanic)	387	10.43%
Native American	14	0.38%
Asian	68	1.83%
Pacific Islander	3	0.08%
Other/Mixed	243	6.55%
Hispanic or Latino	244	6.58%

As of the 2020 United States census, there were 3,710 people, 868 households, and 608 families residing in the town.

=== 2010 census ===
As of the census of 2010, there were 1,632 people, 643 households, and 453 families residing in the town. The population density was 51 people per square mile (20 people/km^{2}). There were 737 housing units at an average density of 22.9 units per square mile (8.8 units/km^{2}). The racial makeup of the town was 84.4% White, 9.4% Black or African American, 0.7% Native American, 0.6% Asian, 3.4% from other races, and 1.5% from two or more races. 5.1% of the population were Hispanic or Latino of any race.

There were 643 households, out of which 29.5% had children under the age of 18 living with them, 49.9% were married couples living together, 14.6% had a female householder with no husband present, and 29.5% were non-families. 25.8% of all households were made up of individuals, and 10.6% had someone living alone who was 65 years of age or older. The average household size was 2.53 and the average family size was 3.00.

In the town, the population was spread out, with 23.9% under the age of 18, 10.4% from 18 to 24, 29.4% from 25 to 44, 26.0% from 45 to 64, and 12.3% who were 65 years of age or older. The median age was 36.2 years. For every 100 females, there were 99.0 males. For every 100 females age 18 and over, there were 102.3 males.

The median income for a household in the town was $32,803, and the median income for a family was $36,042. Males had a median income of $36,563 versus $27,566 for females. The per capita income for the town was $19,796. About 16.7% of families and 20.8% of the population were below the poverty line, including 34.6% of those under age 18 and 13.1% of those age 65 or over.

== Government ==
Loxley is an incorporated city located in Baldwin County, Alabama. It is governed by a mayor and city council, both of which are elected by popular vote every four years. On May 20, 2022, Loxley officially became a city.

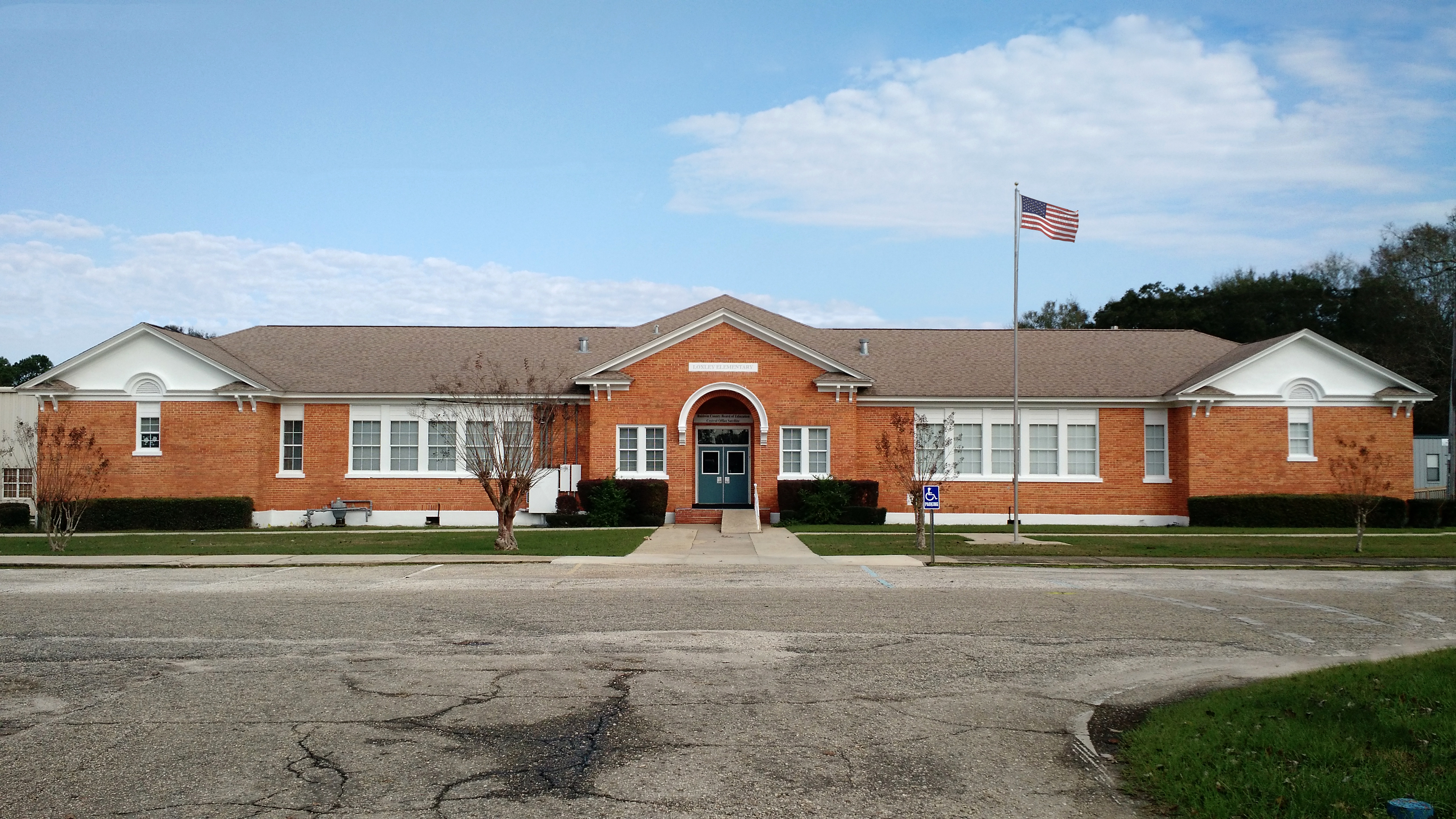
Loxley's original elementary school

== Education ==
Loxley is a part of the Baldwin County Public Schools system.

=== Schools ===
==== Public ====
- Robertsdale High School 9-12
- Central Baldwin Middle School 7 - 8
- Loxley Elementary School K-6

== Events ==
Loxley hosts the Baldwin County Strawberry Festival every spring.

== Notable person ==
- Hilliard P. Jenkins (1922–1992), farmer, philanthropist and civic leader

== See also ==
- Central Baldwin
