= Orange Beach, Alabama =

City in Alabama, United States

- City
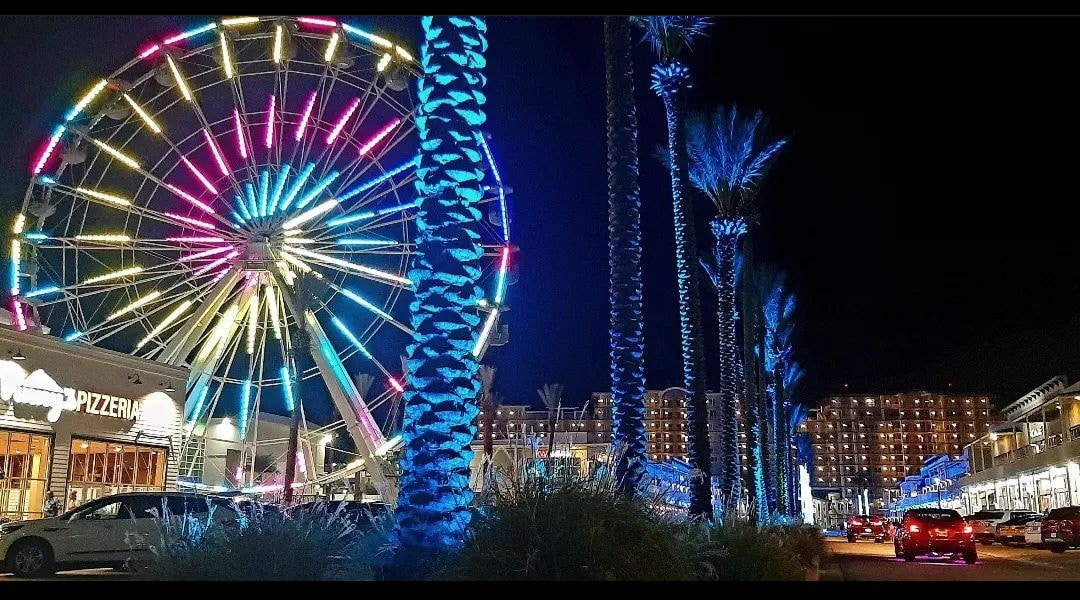
- The Wharf in Orange Beach

- Flag Seal

- Location of Orange Beach in Baldwin County, Alabama
- Coordinates: 30°17′28″N 87°36′45″W
- Country: United States
- State: Alabama
- County: Baldwin
- Founded: Mid-1860s
- Incorporated: August 1, 1984

Government
  - Mayor: Tony Kennon (R)
  - Mayor Pro Tem: Jeff Boyd
  - City Council: Place 1: Annette Mitchell; Place 2: Jeff Boyd; Place 3: Jerry Johnson; Place 4: Jeff Silvers; Place 5: Joni Blalock

Area
  - Total: 15.931 sq mi (41.261 km^{2})
  - Land: 14.716 sq mi (38.114 km^{2})
  - Water: 1.2152 sq mi (3.1474 km^{2})
- Elevation: 7 ft (2.1 m)

Population (2020)
  - Total: 8,095
  - Estimate (2023): 8,534
  - Density: 580/sq mi (223.9/km^{2})
- Time zone: UTC−6 (Central (CST))
  - Summer (DST): UTC−5 (CDT)
- ZIP Code: 36561
- Area code: 251
- FIPS code: 01-57144
- GNIS feature ID: 2404439
- Sales tax: 10.0%
- Website: orangebeachal.gov

Orange Beach is a resort city in Baldwin County, Alabama, United States. The population was 8,095 at the 2020 census. According to 2023 census estimates, the city is estimated to have a population of 8,534.

== Geography ==
Orange Beach is located on Perdido Key along the Gulf of Mexico, and is the easternmost community on Alabama's Gulf Coast, with the community of Perdido Key, Florida bordering it to the east. The city of Gulf Shores is to the west.

According to the United States Census Bureau, the city has a total area of 15.931 square miles (41.26 km^{2}), of which 14.716 square miles (38.11 km^{2}) is land and 1.215 square miles (3.15 km^{2}) is water.

=== Climate ===
Orange Beach has a humid subtropical climate, with mild-to-warm winters, and hot and humid summers. The climate is very similar to that of nearby Pensacola, Florida, as well as elsewhere in the Florida panhandle.

Climate data for Orange Beach, Alabama
Month	Jan	Feb	Mar	Apr	May	Jun	Jul	Aug	Sep	Oct	Nov	Dec	Year
Record high °F (°C)	85 (29)	87 (31)	92 (33)	97 (36)	101 (38)	105 (41)	107 (42)	108 (42)	103 (39)	98 (37)	89 (32)	83 (28)	108 (42)
Mean daily maximum °F (°C)	61 (16)	64 (18)	70 (21)	75 (24)	83 (28)	88 (31)	90 (32)	90 (32)	87 (31)	79 (26)	71 (22)	64 (18)	77 (25)
Mean daily minimum °F (°C)	43 (6)	45 (7)	52 (11)	57 (14)	65 (18)	72 (22)	74 (23)	74 (23)	70 (21)	59 (15)	51 (11)	45 (7)	59 (15)
Record low °F (°C)	4 (−16)	9 (−13)	19 (−7)	29 (−2)	38 (3)	52 (11)	66 (19)	60 (16)	44 (7)	28 (−2)	25 (−4)	7 (−14)	4 (−16)
Average precipitation inches (mm)	5.72 (145)	4.86 (123)	6.32 (161)	3.97 (101)	4.41 (112)	5.17 (131)	7.09 (180)	6.11 (155)	6.75 (171)	4.26 (108)	4.43 (113)	4.02 (102)	63.11 (1,602)
Source: IntelliCast.com

Average sea temperature:
Jan	Feb	Mar	Apr	May	Jun	Jul	Aug	Sep	Oct	Nov	Dec	Year
62.2 °F (16.8 °C)	62.1 °F (16.7 °C)	65.1 °F (18.4 °C)	70 °F (21 °C)	77.2 °F (25.1 °C)	82.9 °F (28.3 °C)	84.6 °F (29.2 °C)	85.3 °F (29.6 °C)	83.7 °F (28.7 °C)	78.3 °F (25.7 °C)	70.9 °F (21.6 °C)	65.7 °F (18.7 °C)	74 °F (23 °C)

== Demographics ==
Historical population
Census	Pop.	Note	%±
1990	2,253		—
2000	3,784		68.0%
2010	5,441		43.8%
2020	8,095		48.8%
2025 (est.)	8,798	▲	8.7%
U.S. Decennial Census; 2020 Census

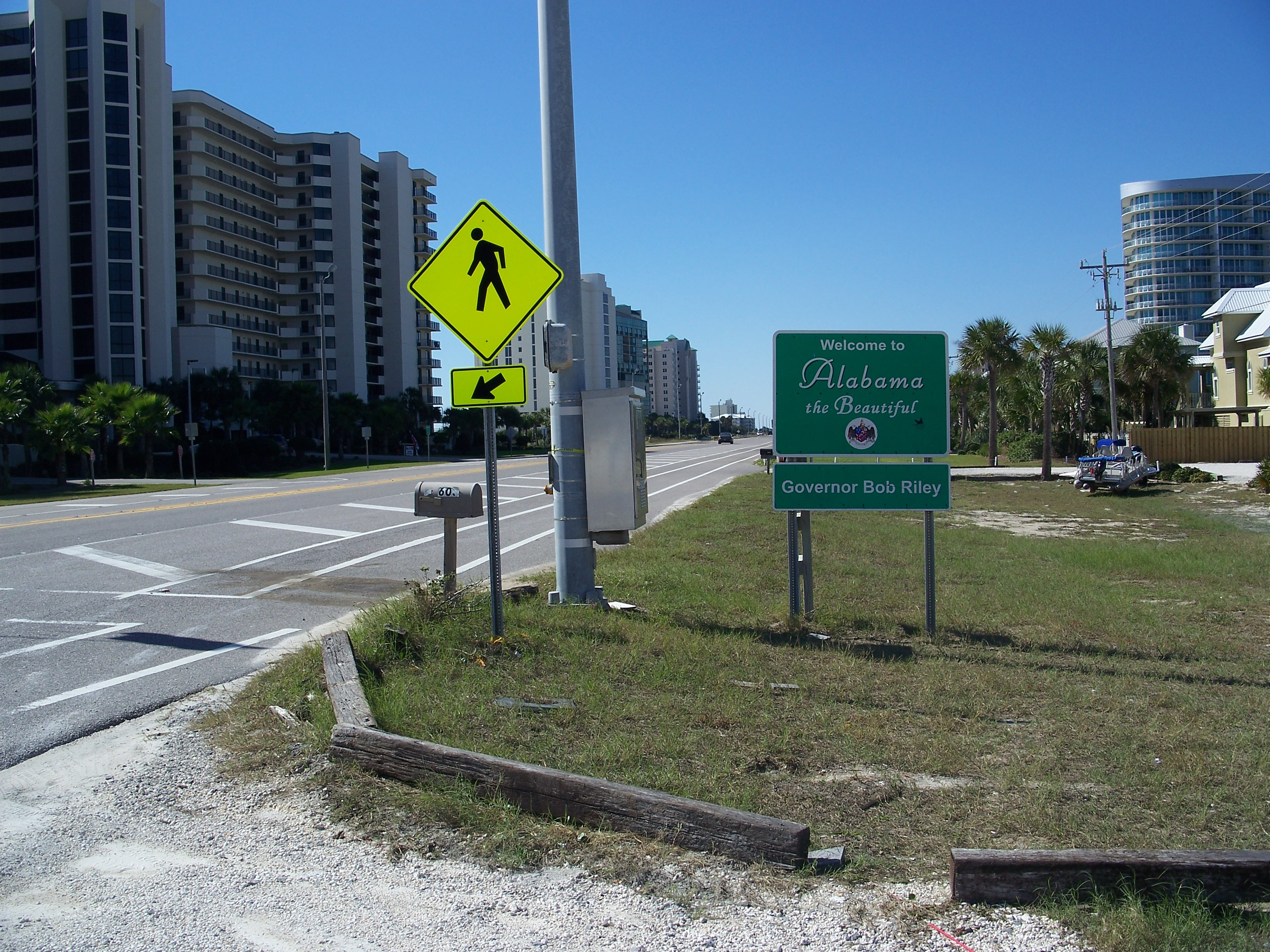
Alabama Welcome sign on the Alabama-Florida border in Orange Beach

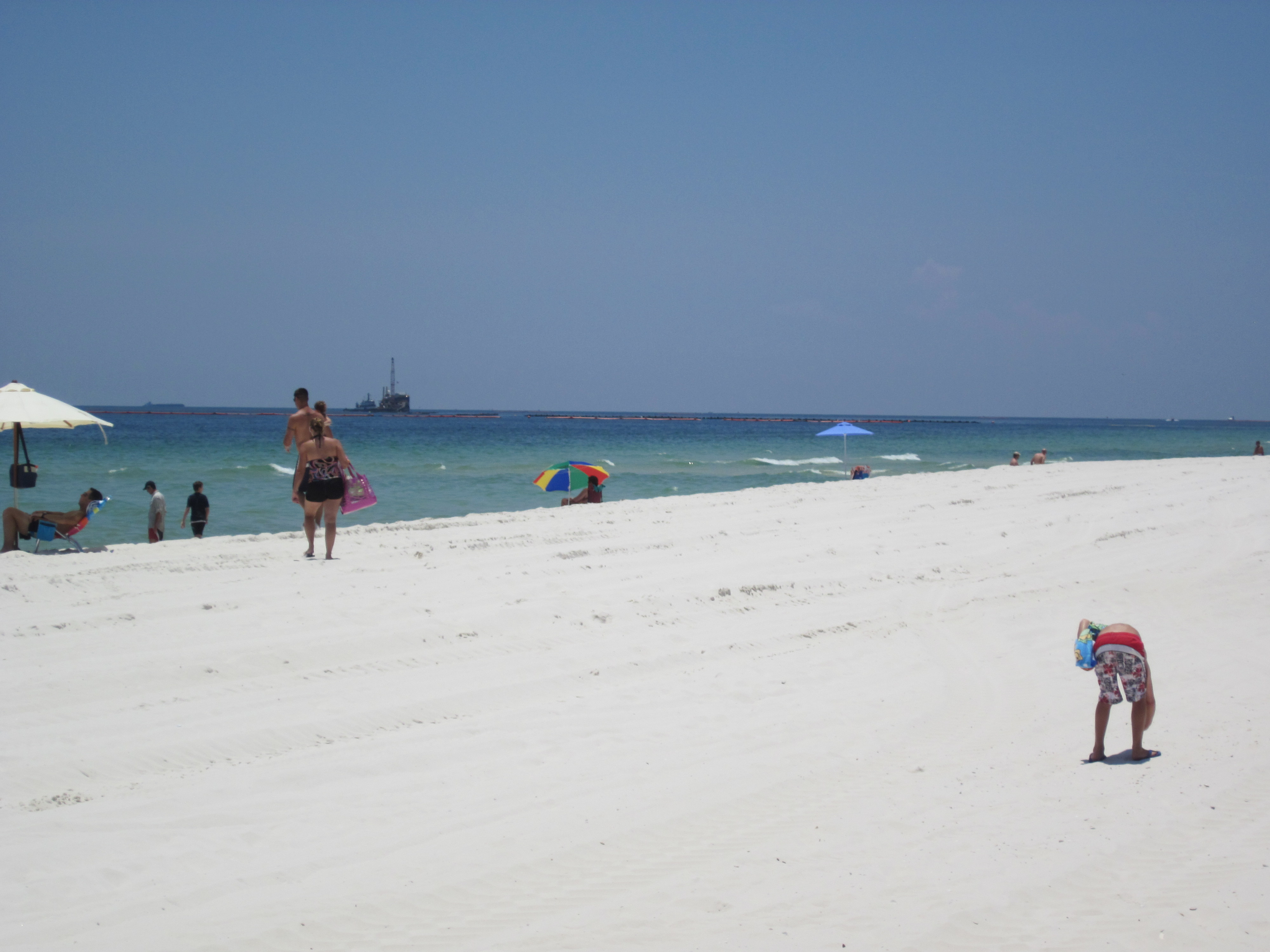
Orange Beach in 2010

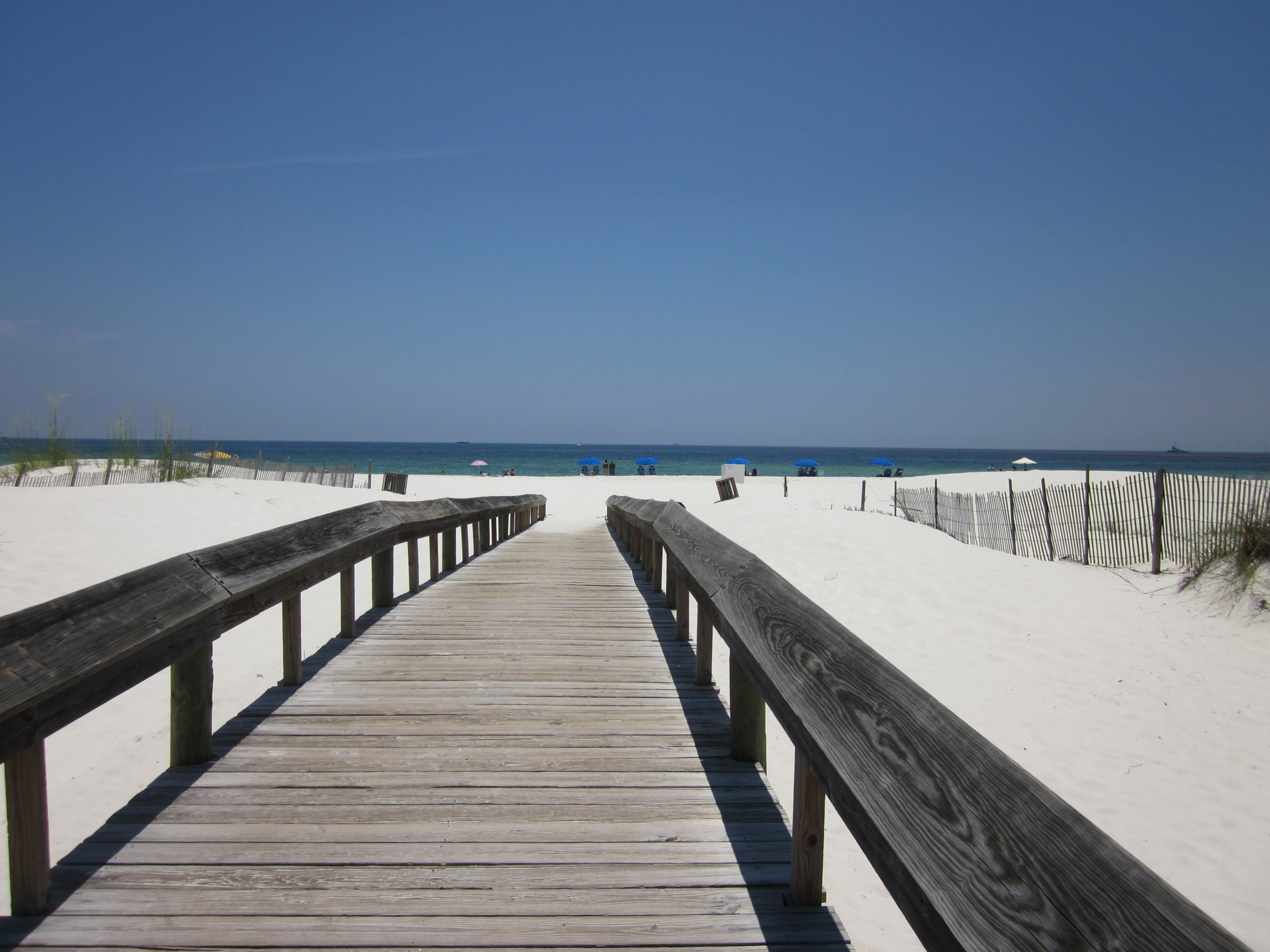
Orange Beach boardwalk

=== 2020 census ===
Orange Beach, Alabama – Racial Composition (NH = Non-Hispanic) Note: the US Census treats Hispanic/Latino as an ethnic category. This table excludes Latinos from the racial categories and assigns them to a separate category. Hispanics/Latinos can be of any race.
Race	Number	Percentage
White (NH)	7,373	91.08%
Black or African American (NH)	85	1.05%
Native American or Alaska Native (NH)	39	0.48%
Asian (NH)	57	0.7%
Pacific Islander (NH)	1	0.01%
Some Other Race (NH)	22	0.30%
Mixed/Multi-Racial (NH)	305	3.80%
Hispanic or Latino	213	2.63%
Total	8,095	100.00%

As of the 2020 census, there were 8,095 people, 3,793 households, and 2,343 families residing in the city. The population density was 550.2 inhabitants per square mile (212.4/km^{2}). There were 14,545 housing units.

The median age was 50.6 years. 15.4% of residents were under the age of 18, 2.1% were under 5 years of age, and 25.3% were 65 years of age or older. For every 100 females there were 94.5 males, and for every 100 females age 18 and over there were 93.7 males age 18 and over.

95.5% of residents lived in urban areas, while 4.5% lived in rural areas.

Of all households, 21.1% had children under the age of 18 living in them. 49.2% were married-couple households, 18.6% were households with a male householder and no spouse or partner present, and 26.2% were households with a female householder and no spouse or partner present. About 31.6% of all households were made up of individuals, and 12.9% had someone living alone who was 65 years of age or older. The homeowner vacancy rate was 2.6% and the rental vacancy rate was 72.1%.

=== 2010 census ===
As of the 2010 census, there were 5,441 people, 2,492 households, and 1,544 families residing in the city. The population density was 370.1 inhabitants per square mile (142.9/km^{2}). There were 11,726 housing units at an average density of 737.5 inhabitants per square mile (284.8/km^{2}). The racial makeup of the city was 94.3% White, 0.6% Black or African American, 0.7% Native American, 0.8% Asian, 1.4% from other races, and 2.2% from two or more races. 2.6% of the population were Hispanic or Latino of any race.

There were 2,492 households, out of which 21.6% had children under the age of 18 living with them, 50.2% were married couples living together, 7.5% had a female householder with no husband present, and 38.0% were non-families. 30.5% of all households were made up of individuals, and 10.8% had someone living alone who was 65 years of age or older. The average household size was 2.18 and the average family size was 2.70.

In the city, the population was 18.7% under the age of 18, 6.7% from 18 to 24, 23.7% from 25 to 44, 31.7% from 45 to 64, and 19.2% who were 65 years of age or older. The median age was 45.5 years. For every 100 females, there were 98.8 males. For every 100 females age 18 and over, there were 96.1 males. The median income for a household in the city was $66,656, and the median income for a family was $69,964. Males had a median income of $54,806 versus $47,019 for females. The per capita income for the city was $40,153. About 1.2% of families and 3.0% of the population were below the poverty line, including 0.0% of those under age 18 and 2.8% of those age 65 or over.

== Sports ==
The city of Orange Beach hosts many sporting events and tournaments at the Orange Beach Sportsplex. The Sportsplex, located north of the Gulf State Park and a short distance from The Wharf, comprises a football/soccer stadium with a seating capacity of 1,500. The facility also has several baseball and softball fields. The Backcountry Trail system through the Gulf State Park has a trailhead located at the Sportsplex.

The Sportsplex has hosted the SEC Women's Soccer Tournament on numerous occasions, in addition to the NCAA Division II men and women's soccer tournament. The facility once served as home to the Alabama Lightning of the North American Football League.

The city also owns and operates the Orange Beach Shooting Complex, which offers trap and skeet options for both Orange Beach residents and non-residents, and local high school shooting sports teams.

A 112 feet (34 m) high Ferris wheel is located at The Wharf in Orange Beach.

Orange Beach is home to the Orange Beach Running Club, which meets every Monday evening to run a 5K.

== Education ==
Orange Beach is part of the Orange Beach City Schools system. Orange Beach Elementary School is the city's only elementary school and serves students in grades kindergarten through sixth grade. Students in grades seven and twelve attend Orange Beach Middle & High School.

Previously residents were in the Baldwin County Public Schools school district and zoned to Gulf Shores Middle School and Gulf Shores High School in neighboring Gulf Shores. In 2019, these schools separated into the Gulf Shores City Schools district. For the 2019–2020 school year, Orange Beach grade 7-10 students and grade 7-10 students in unincorporated areas had a choice between remaining with Gulf Shores schools or attending temporary classrooms established by Baldwin County schools. Orange Beach Middle and High opened in 2020. In 2022, Orange Beach separated from the Baldwin County district.

Columbia Southern University is a private, online-only university that is located in Orange Beach, with a campus in Orange Beach on Canal Road and a larger campus on the Beach Express road.

== Transportation ==
Countywide dial-a-ride transit service is provided by BRATS, the Baldwin Regional Area Transit System.
