= Gulf Shores, Alabama =

City in Alabama, United States

- City
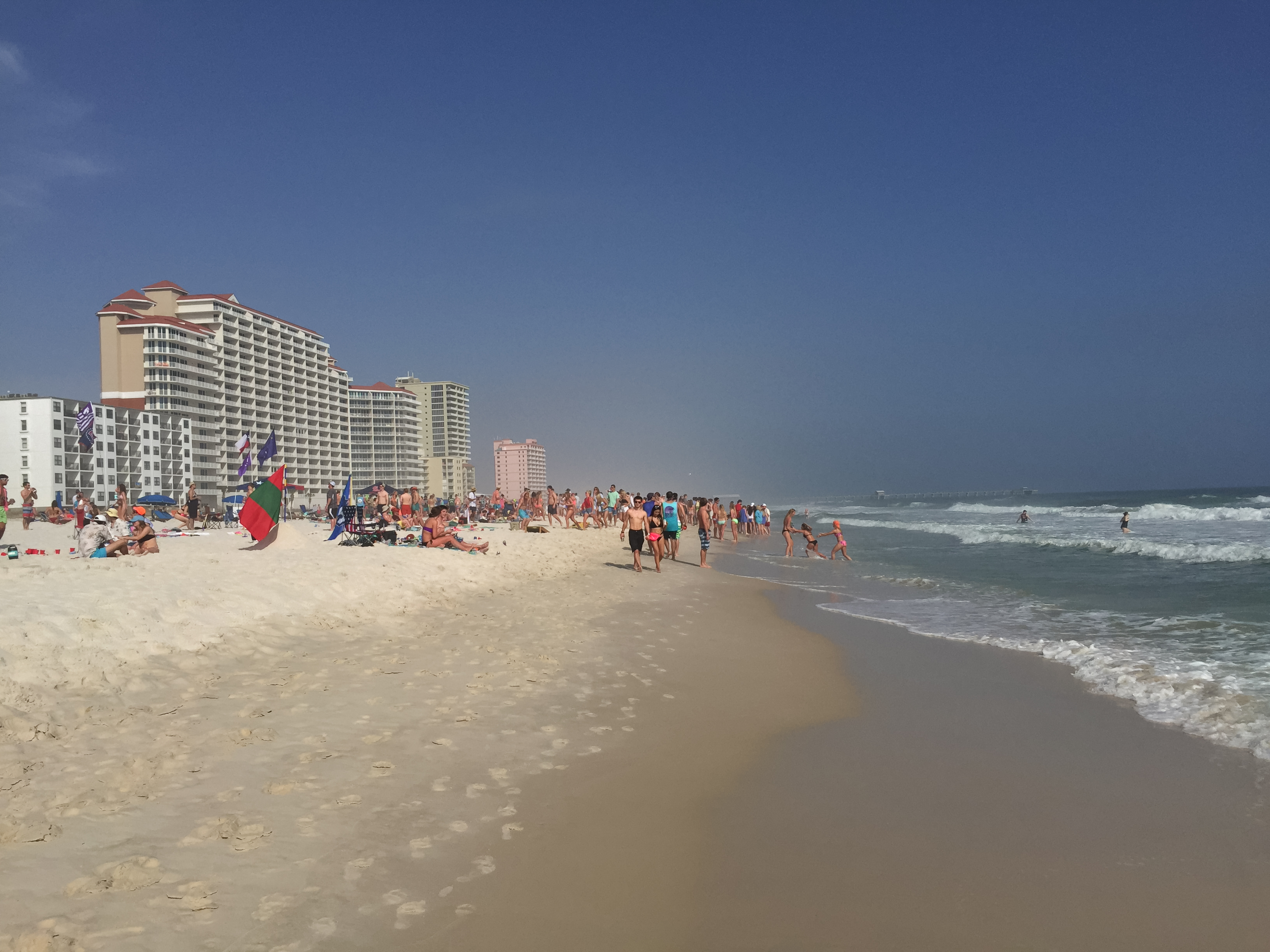
- Beach during Spring Break with condominiums and hotels in the background

- Flag Logo
- Motto(s): Small Town, Big Beach
- Location of Gulf Shores in Baldwin County, Alabama.
- Coordinates: 30°15′50″N 87°43′15″W
- Country: United States
- State: Alabama
- County: Baldwin

Area
  - Total: 33.21 sq mi (86.01 km^{2})
  - Land: 28.36 sq mi (73.46 km^{2})
  - Water: 4.85 sq mi (12.55 km^{2})
- Elevation: 7 ft (2.1 m)

Population (2020)
  - Total: 15,014
  - Density: 529.3/sq mi (204.38/km^{2})
- Time zone: UTC−6 (Central (CST))
  - Summer (DST): UTC−5 (CDT)
- ZIP Codes: 36542, 36547
- Area code: 251
- FIPS code: 01-32272
- GNIS feature ID: 2403770
- Website: www.gulfshoresal.gov

Gulf Shores is a resort city in Baldwin County, Alabama, United States. As of the 2020 census, the population was 15,014.

== Geography ==
Gulf Shores is located on the Gulf of Mexico, and is the southernmost settlement in the state of Alabama. It is served by Alabama State Route 59 (Gulf Shores Parkway), which leads north to Foley. Route 182 (Beach Boulevard) runs east-west along the shore front, while Route 180 (Fort Morgan Road) runs parallel to it, north of Little Lagoon. Gulf State Park occupies a large eastern part of the city.

According to the U.S. Census Bureau, the city has a total area of 28.0 square miles (72.5 km^{2}), of which 23.2 square miles (60.0 km^{2}) is land and 4.8 square miles (12.5 km^{2}), or 17.24%, is water.

=== Climate ===
Gulf Shores has a humid subtropical climate, with long, hot summers, and mild and sunny winters. Daily highs in winter are close to 60 °F (16 °C) and nighttime lows are near 40 °F (4 °C). Daytime highs in summer are near 90 °F (32 °C) and evening lows near 78 °F (26 °C). Ocean surf temperatures are quite warm from May through November, often well into the low 80s.

As a result of being located on the northern coast of the Gulf of Mexico, Gulf Shores is vulnerable to tropical cyclones. In September 1979, Hurricane Frederic caused massive destruction, leveling most of the town. On September 16, 2004, Hurricane Ivan made landfall in Gulf Shores, causing extensive wind and flooding damage. In 2005, while the city was still cleaning up from Ivan, Hurricane Katrina caused extensive damage and flooding. The area was then struck again on September 16, 2020, when Hurricane Sally made landfall on the 16 year anniversary of Ivan, causing extensive damage and widespread flooding.

Climate data for Gulf Shores, Alabama
Month	Jan	Feb	Mar	Apr	May	Jun	Jul	Aug	Sep	Oct	Nov	Dec	Year
Record high °F (°C)	81 (27)	77 (25)	81 (27)	88 (31)	95 (35)	96 (36)	101 (38)	98 (37)	97 (36)	93 (34)	84 (29)	84 (29)	101 (38)
Mean daily maximum °F (°C)	59 (15)	62 (17)	67 (19)	74 (23)	82 (28)	87 (31)	89 (32)	89 (32)	86 (30)	78 (26)	69 (21)	62 (17)	75 (24)
Mean daily minimum °F (°C)	45 (7)	49 (9)	55 (13)	63 (17)	71 (22)	76 (24)	78 (26)	78 (26)	75 (24)	66 (19)	56 (13)	48 (9)	63 (17)
Record low °F (°C)	9 (−13)	20 (−7)	23 (−5)	30 (−1)	50 (10)	55 (13)	65 (18)	64 (18)	52 (11)	37 (3)	24 (−4)	11 (−12)	9 (−13)
Average precipitation inches (mm)	5.29 (134)	5.49 (139)	5.31 (135)	4.27 (108)	4.41 (112)	5.14 (131)	6.23 (158)	7.19 (183)	5.38 (137)	3.85 (98)	4.14 (105)	4.87 (124)	61.57 (1,564)
Source: The Weather Channel

== Demographics ==
Historical population
Census	Pop.	Note	%±
1960	356		—
1970	909		155.3%
1980	1,349		48.4%
1990	3,261		141.7%
2000	5,044		54.7%
2010	9,741		93.1%
2020	15,014		54.1%
2025 (est.)	17,394	▲	15.9%
U.S. Decennial Census

=== Racial and ethnic composition ===
Gulf Shores city, Alabama – Racial and ethnic composition Note: the US Census treats Hispanic/Latino as an ethnic category. This table excludes Latinos from the racial categories and assigns them to a separate category. Hispanics/Latinos may be of any race. Race and ethnicity were not reported in Alabama for populations under 2,500 in 1980 and under 1,000 in 1990.
Race / Ethnicity (NH = Non-Hispanic)	Pop 1990	Pop 2000	Pop 2010	Pop 2020	% 1990	% 2000	% 2010	% 2020
White alone (NH)	3,224	4,880	8,856	13,062	98.87%	96.75%	90.91%	87.00%
Black or African American alone (NH)	1	11	141	307	0.03%	0.22%	1.45%	2.04%
Native American or Alaska Native alone (NH)	6	21	51	63	0.18%	0.42%	0.52%	0.42%
Asian alone (NH)	6	14	91	161	0.18%	0.28%	0.93%	1.07%
Native Hawaiian or Pacific Islander alone (NH)	x	2	11	6	x	0.04%	0.11%	0.04%
Other race alone (NH)	4	3	24	93	0.12%	0.06%	0.25%	0.62%
Mixed race or Multiracial (NH)	x	51	173	700	x	1.01%	1.78%	4.66%
Hispanic or Latino (any race)	20	62	394	622	0.61%	1.23%	4.04%	4.14%
Total	3,261	5,044	9,741	15,014	100.00%	100.00%	100.00%	100.00%

=== 2020 census ===
As of the 2020 census, Gulf Shores had a population of 15,014, with 3,347 families residing in 6,847 households. The median age was 49.4 years. 16.6% of residents were under the age of 18 and 25.9% were 65 years of age or older. For every 100 females there were 92.0 males, and for every 100 females age 18 and over there were 89.7 males age 18 and over.

90.7% of residents lived in urban areas, while 9.3% lived in rural areas.

Of the 6,847 households, 22.3% had children under the age of 18 living in them. Of all households, 47.6% were married-couple households, 17.9% were households with a male householder and no spouse or partner present, and 28.2% were households with a female householder and no spouse or partner present. About 30.5% of all households were made up of individuals and 13.4% had someone living alone who was 65 years of age or older.

There were 13,682 housing units, of which 50.0% were vacant. The homeowner vacancy rate was 2.7% and the rental vacancy rate was 43.3%.

=== 2010 census ===
As of the census of 2010, there were 9,741 people living in the city. The population density was 274.3 per square mile (105.9/km^{2}). There were 6,810 housing units at an average density of 370.4 per square mile (143.0/km^{2}). The racial makeup of the city was 97.54% White, 0.22% Black or African American, 0.44% Native American, 0.30% Asian, 0.04% Pacific Islander, 0.40% from other races, and 1.07% from two or more races. Of the population 1.23% were Hispanic or Latino of any race.

There were 2,344 households, out of which 20.7% had children under the age of 18 living with them, 56.2% were married couples living together, 7.0% had a female householder with no husband present, and 34.1% were non-families. Of all households 26.7% were made up of individuals, and 10.0% had someone living alone who was 65 years of age or older. The average household size was 2.15 and the average family size was 2.56.

Of the population 16.4% was under the age of 18, 6.7% from 18 to 24, 24.8% from 25 to 44, 29.0% from 45 to 64, and 23.1% who were 65 years of age or older. The median age was 46 years. For every 100 females, there were 97.3 males. For every 100 females age 18 and over, there were 95.5 males. The median income for a household in the city was $41,826, and the median income for a family was $51,862. Males had a median income of $40,259 versus $22,467 for females. The per capita income for the city was $24,356. About 6.8% of families and 9.9% of the population were below the poverty line, including 6.4% of those under age 18 and 6.5% of those age 65 or over.

Since the year 2000, Baldwin County as a whole has experienced rapid population growth, second only to Shelby County in Alabama.

== Economy ==
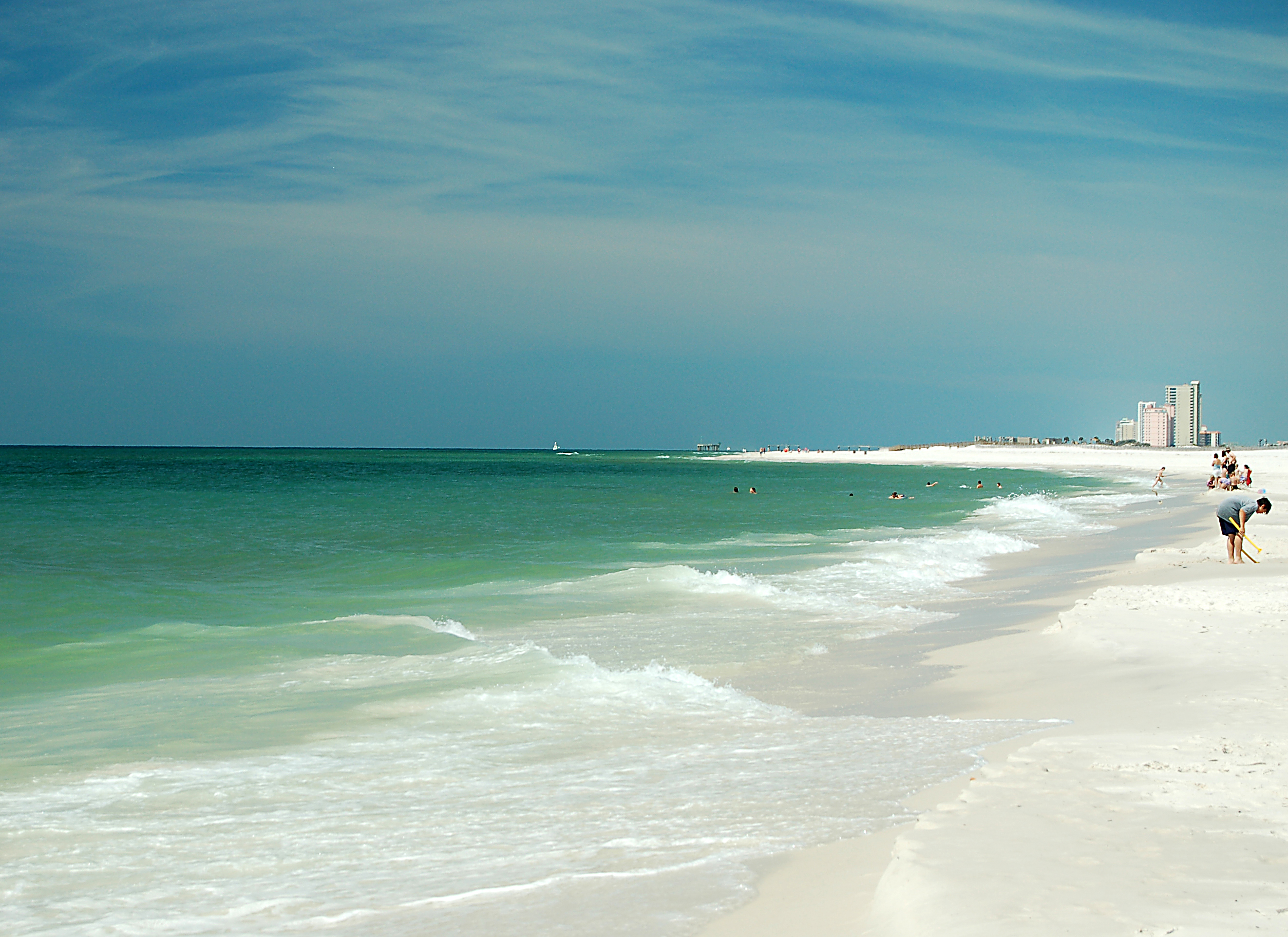
Beach at Gulf State Park

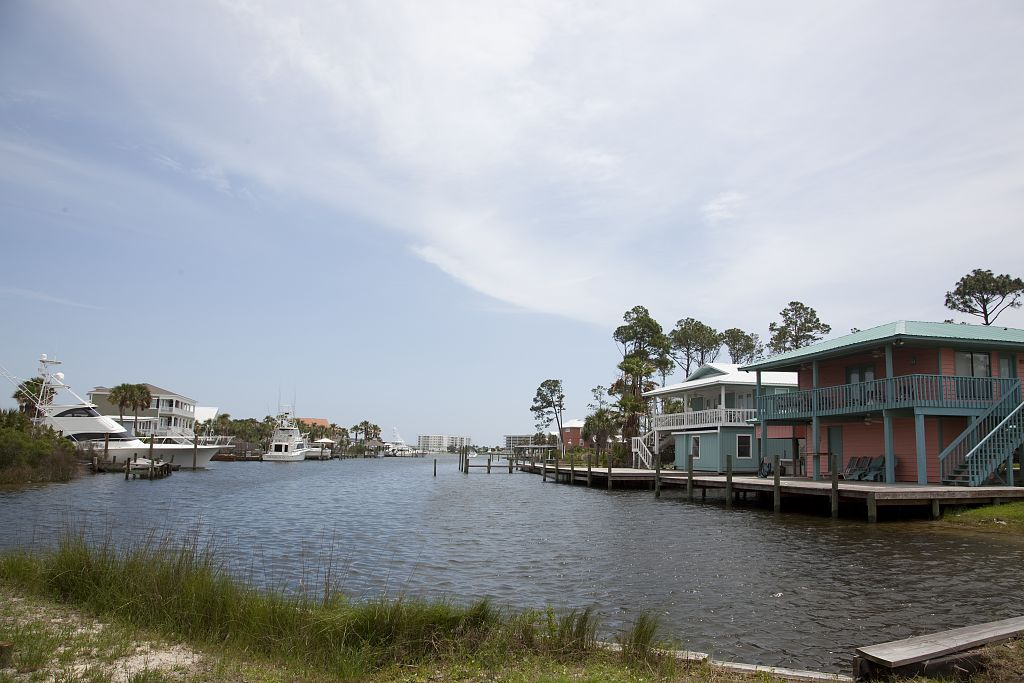
Residential area on the canal

=== Tourism ===
Tourism dominates the economy of Gulf Shores. The 2010 BP oil spill was expected to adversely affect both local real estate and beach tourism. After a year of decline, the tourism economy in Gulf Shores returned to pre-spill levels.

Attractions in Gulf Shores include Alabama Gulf Coast Zoo; Pelican Place at Craft Farms, a shopping mall; Waterville USA, a family amusement/waterpark; and 10 golf courses.

Hangout Music Festival is an annual three-day music festival on the beach each May.

Some residents opposed the building of a new hotel on state property, and the use of BP Oil spill funds to finance projects other than environmental repair.

In 2022, the city introduced a plan to make a $15 million revitalization of Gulf Place, a public beach area. Amenities will include a boardwalk, parking, green space, and restrooms. The project will involve sustainable and low-impact development strategies, including stormwater management, and beach dune restoration to provide animal habitat and protection from storm surge.

== Education ==
Public education was originally administered by Baldwin County Public Schools. The Gulf Shores City School System was established in 2017. Schools include:

- Gulf Shores High School (grades 9–12)
- Gulf Shores Middle School (grades 7–8)
- Gulf Shores Elementary School (grades K–6)

== Infrastructure ==
Jack Edwards National Airport is located in Gulf Shores and offers services from Gulf Air Center, Salt Air Aviation Center and Platinum Air Center.

Countywide dial-a-ride transit service is provided by BRATS, the Baldwin Regional Area Transit System.
