= Hurricane Ivan tornado outbreak =

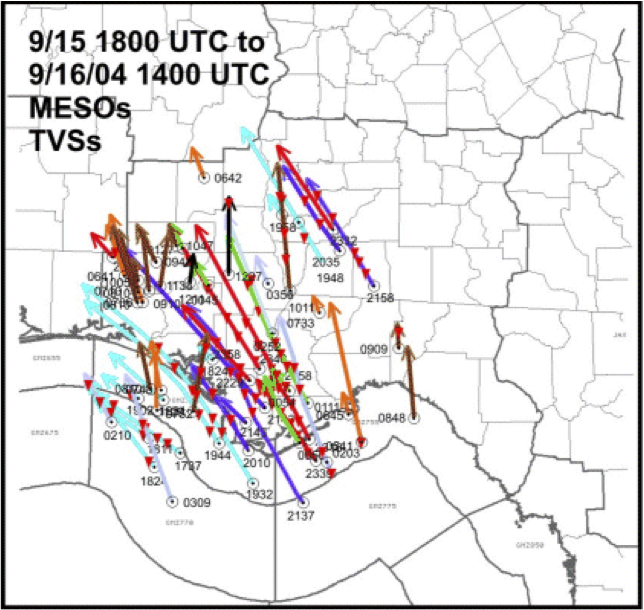
- Tracks of the 50 mesocyclones and multiple tornado vortex signatures (denoted by inverted red triangles) identified by the NWS Office in Tallahassee, Florida between 1:00 p.m. on September 15 to 9:00 a.m. on September 16.

Meteorological history
- Date: September 15–18, 2004

Tornado outbreak
- Tornadoes: 120 (Note: Sources differ on the number of tornadoes during the outbreak. The National Climatic Data Center indicates 119 tornadoes; the Tallahassee, Florida branch of the National Weather Service states approximately 117 tornadoes; Thomas P. Grazulis and Bill McCaul state 120 tornadoes.) (Record for a continuous outbreak in September)
- Max. rating: F3 tornado
- Duration: 2 days, 14 hours, 17 minutes (Note: First tornado touched down at 1:53 p.m. on September 15 and the last dissipated at 3:10 a.m. on September 18.)

Overall effects
- Fatalities: 7
- Damage: $96.9 million (Note: All damage figures in the article are in 2004 United States dollars (USD))
- Part of the Hurricane Ivan and the tornado outbreaks of 2004

The Hurricane Ivan tornado outbreak was a three-day tornado outbreak that was associated with the passage of Hurricane Ivan across the Southern United States starting on September 15, 2004, across the Gulf Coast states of Alabama and Florida as well as southern Georgia before ending in the Middle Atlantic Coast on September 18.

The outbreak killed 7 people and injured dozens of others across several states from Florida to Pennsylvania. The hurricane itself killed at least 90 people from the US to the eastern Caribbean Islands. Overall, it produced 120 tornadoes, surpassing the record of 117 that was previously held by Hurricane Beulah during the 1967 Atlantic hurricane season. Ivan also produced 16 more tornadoes than Hurricane Frances, whose associated tornado outbreak struck many of the same regions about ten days earlier. The tornado outbreak was also the largest in Virginia history.

== Meteorological synopsis ==
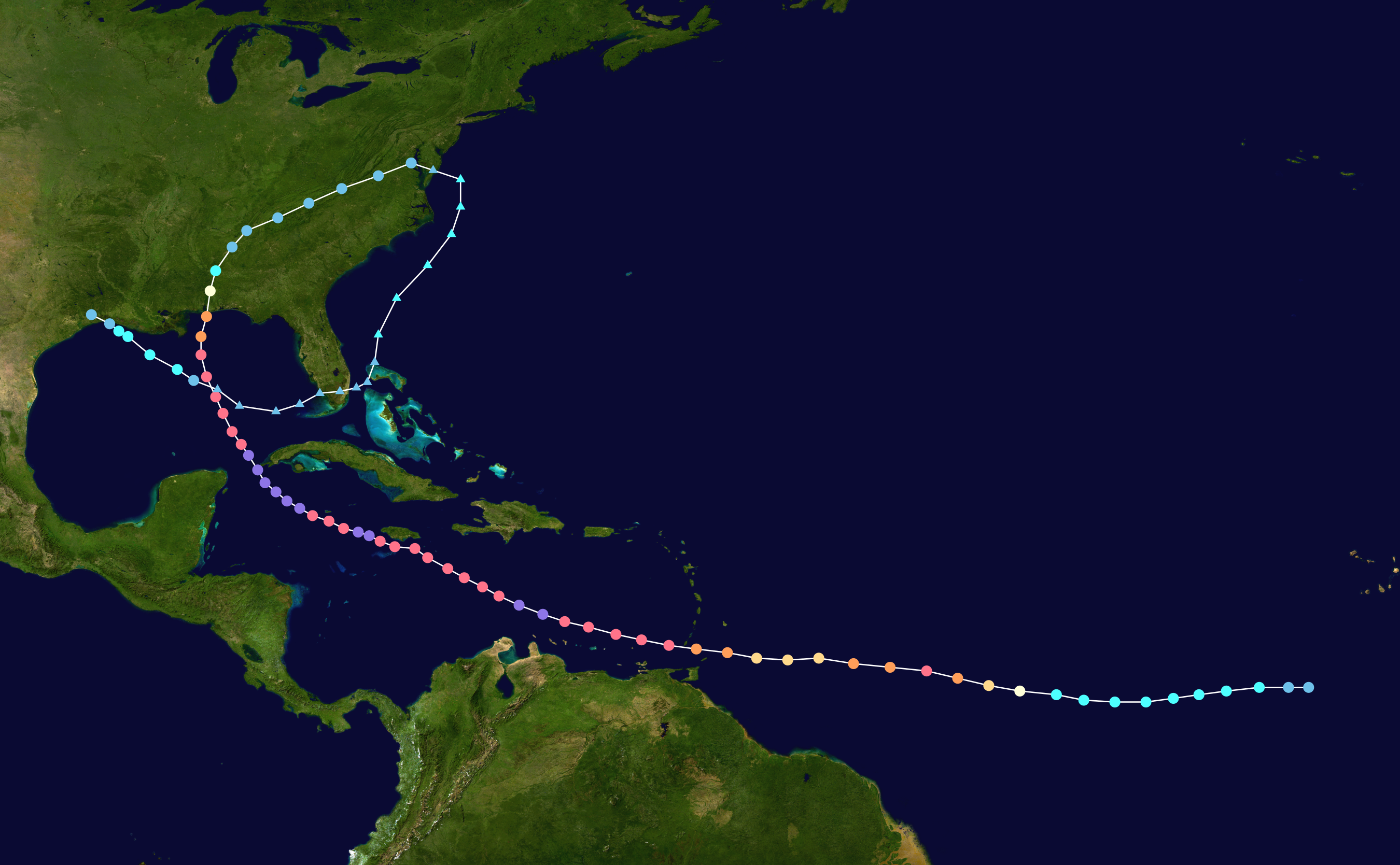
Track of Hurricane Ivan

On September 13, 2004, as Category 5 hurricane Ivan moved through the Yucatán Channel, the Storm Prediction Center noted the possibility of isolated tornadoes for parts of Louisiana and the Florida Panhandle three days out. Though the storm weakened while approaching the United States, strong low-level wind shear along its northeastern periphery allowed for the development of potentially tornadic supercells. A National Oceanic and Atmospheric Administration Hurricane Hunter aircraft intercepted Ivan during the afternoon and evening of September 15. During the mission, dropwindsondes were deployed off the Gulf Coast to assess the rainband environment. By this time, an intense band of thunderstorms, with embedded supercells, developed about 250 mi (400 km) east of the hurricane's center. A thermodynamic sounding around 1:00 p.m. EST from Tampa Bay, Florida revealed unusually favorable conditions for deep, rotating convection. Ahead of the band, convective available potential energy (CAPE) levels reached 2,500 J/kg and significant helicity. The significant levels of CAPE, accompanied by a dry air intrusion between the rainband and the main convection of Ivan, were the primary cause of the outbreak. A comparison between Ivan and Hurricane Jeanne revealed that both storms encountered similar conditions near landfall; however, CAPE values were lower during Jeanne and the system produced far fewer tornadoes.

In light of the increased tornado threat, the first tornado watch was issued around 1:00 p.m. EST for the Florida Panhandle and southern Alabama. By then, "miniature" supercell thunderstorms began approaching the coastline. Data from Doppler weather radar indicated mesocyclones within several of the cells, though mostly while over water. At the onset of the outbreak, three cells exhibited signature characteristics of supercell thunderstorms: cyclonic updraft and a hook-like appendage. Similar to storms over the Great Plains, a mid-level rear flank downdraft was present; however, this feature did not reach the surface. Less than an hour after the watch was issued, the first tornado of the outbreak touched down in Escambia County, Florida. Over the course of the next 20 hours, the National Weather Service (NWS) office in Tallahassee monitored over 50 mesocyclones that had sufficient vorticity to spawn tornadoes. The high number of potential storms led to the issuance of 130 tornado warnings, of which only 20 later verified. One of the mesocyclones had a "nearly textbook appearance" and produced four tornadoes between 8:15 p.m. and 9:50 p.m. as it traveled nearly 75 miles across the Florida Big Bend. Two of these tornadoes reached F2 intensity and, collectively, they killed four people, injured eight more, and left $5.5 million in damage. By midnight on September 15, 26 tornadoes had touched down across three states.

With the tornado threat gradually moving northward, new tornado watches were issued further north into much of South Carolina. During the first half of September 16, several F0 tornadoes touched down across the Southeast. By the afternoon, downstream subsidence limited thunderstorm activity; however, as the day wore on, sufficient warm, moist air from the Gulf Stream and breaks in cloud cover allowed for CAPE values to rise. Extensive convective banding to the north and east of the storm continued to encounter extreme levels of helicity. Subsequently, numerous rotating thunderstorms developed over the region, especially across Georgia and South Carolina. Throughout the afternoon, 22 tornadoes touched down across the two states, one of which, an F2, killed one person. The majority of the activity took place along a warm front that developed east of Tropical Storm Ivan within the shear maxima.

Following a lull in activity during the overnight hours between September 16 and 17, conditions once more became increasingly favorable for tornadoes across North Carolina and Virginia. Strong shear associated with the weakening tropical cyclone and the destabilization of air ahead of the main rainband and consequently, a tornado watch was issued for portions of both states around 10:00 a.m.

== Tornado event ==
Outbreak death toll
State	Total	County	County total
Florida	6	Bay	2
Florida	6	Calhoun	4
Georgia	1	Franklin	1
Totals	7		
All deaths were tornado-related

The tornado outbreak began during the early afternoon of September 15, when the first outer rain bands and thunderstorms moved ashore across the southern states. One person was killed in Panama City, Florida when a tornado tore through the city damaging many businesses. The tornado that hit just before 4:00 p.m. was caught on camera as it skirted just outside a local television station that was doing severe weather coverage as tornado warnings were issued in the Panama City media market area. At the same time, another deadly tornado touched down in Bay County, Florida killing 1 when a wood-frame home was lifted and smashed, killing an occupant. Later during the evening many other tornadoes touched down across the Panhandle region of west Florida. An F2 tornado in Calhoun County, Florida tossed mobile homes in the air, killing two occupants in each of 2 mobile homes. At the same time the center of the hurricane was approaching the Florida/southern Alabama state and coastline near Gulf Shores. At least 26 tornadoes were confirmed during the day.

After the cyclone made landfall near Gulf Shores, Alabama, the tornado activity shifted further north into central Alabama and the northern half of Georgia as well as South Carolina. One person was killed in Franklin County, Georgia by an F2 tornado that damaged several businesses and homes. 32 tornadoes were confirmed on that day. As the remnants of Ivan, now a tropical depression moved further inland, increased instability and thunderstorm cells produced a large tornado outbreak from the northern Carolinas to Pennsylvania. Virginia was the hardest hit state during the day as nearly 40 tornadoes affected the state. Several F2s and one F3 touched down, causing significant damage to numerous structures including homes and businesses. Areas roughly to the west and south of Washington, D.C. were the hardest hit areas. Nearly 60 tornadoes were confirmed on that day before the outbreak ceased during the overnight hours of September 18 across Maryland.

== Confirmed tornadoes ==
Confirmed tornadoes by Fujita rating
FU	F0	F1	F2	F3	F4	F5	Total
0	48	53	18	1	0	0	120

=== September 15 event ===
Confirmed tornadoes during the September 15–18, 2004 tornado outbreak (Note: All dates are based on the local time zone where the tornado touched down; however, all times are in Coordinated Universal Time for consistency.) (Note: All damage totals are in 2004 USD)
F#	Location	County / Parish	State	Coord.	Time (UTC)	Path length	Max width	Summary
F0	W of Perdido Key, Florida	Escambia (FL), Baldwin (AL)	FL, AL	30.30°N 87.48°W	1853–1906	5 miles (8.0 km)	30 yd (27 m)	A fast-moving, weak tornado touched down near Perdido Key and caused minor damage before dissipating southwest of Josephine, Alabama.
F0	E of Pensacola Beach to W of Gulf Breeze	Escambia, Santa Rosa	FL	30°20′N 87°00′W	1955–2003	12 miles (19 km)	30 yards (27 m)	A weak tornado touched down in a sparsely populated area east of Pensacola and caused only minor damage before dissipating near Gulf Breeze.
F0	SE of Mexico Beach	Gulf	FL	29°55′N 85°23′W	2035–2037	3 miles (4.8 km)	100 yards (91 m)	A short-lived tornado caused minor damage to several homes in Beacon Hill. Several trees and power lines were also felled.
F1	SW of Panama City	Bay	FL	30°06′N 85°45′W	2040–2050	5 miles (8.0 km)		1 death – A strong F1 tornado touched down near the St. Andrews recreation area, where it damaged dozens of commercial structures. Traveling northward, the storm then moved through Grand Lagoon. There, one person was killed when a real estate office was destroyed and seven others were injured in a restaurant. The tornado came within 100 yards (91 m) of the WJHG-TV station before dissipating. Overall, damage from this event was estimated at $5 million.
F0	Centerville area	Early	GA	31°16′N 84°54′W	2040	0.5 miles (0.80 km)		Brief tornado downed trees and power lines.
F1	Allanton area	Bay	FL	29°59′N 85°24′W	2043–2052	5 miles (8.0 km)		1 death – Shortly after the previous tornado touched down, another formed near Allanton. This storm lofted a wood-frame home, with seven people inside, about 60 feet (18 m) into a field; one person was killed and another was injured. Several other homes were damaged before the tornado dissipated.
F0	Blakely area	Early	GA	31°23′N 84°57′W	2055–2057	1 mile (1.6 km)		Brief tornado caused minor damage to a county jail. Scattered trees and power lines were also felled.
F1	Cedar Grove area	Bay	FL	30°08′N 85°10′W	2100–2107	6 miles (9.7 km)		Another F1 tornado touched down in Bay County, this time near Cedar Grove, and destroyed several homes along its path. Losses from the storm reached $2 million.
F0	S of Damascus	Early	GA	31°15′N 84°43′W	2116	2 miles (3.2 km)		A short-lived tornado caused minor damage to a few homes. Several trees and power lines were also felled.
F0	Colquitt area	Miller	GA	31°07′N 84°41′W	2137–2142	4 miles (6.4 km)		A weak tornado struck Colquitt, damaging nine homes and two businesses.
F0	W of Arlington	Calhoun	GA	31°26′N 84°48′W	2142	0.2 miles (0.32 km)		A brief tornado downed trees and power lines.
F1	Whigham area	Grady	GA	30°51′N 84°17′W	2219–2241	15 miles (24 km)		A relatively long-lived tornado damaged five homes and several chicken houses in Whigham. Numerous trees and power lines were also felled by the storm, blocking off many roads.
F0	W of Dixie	Escambia	AL	31°09′N 86°45′W	2220–2223	3 miles (4.8 km)		Weak tornado caused minor tree damage.
F0	S of Castleberry	Conecuh	AL	31°16′N 87°01′W	2240–2242	1 mile (1.6 km)		Brief tornado caused minor tree damage.
F1	S of Hoggard Mill	Baker	GA	30°09′N 84°28′W	2307	1 mile (1.6 km)		Several trees were twisted or uprooted and power lines were felled.
F0	SE of Youngstown	Bay	FL	30°20′N 85°24′W	2320–2328	7 miles (11 km)		A weak tornado downed numerous trees and power lines.
F1	Crestview area	Baker	GA	31°20′N 84°37′W	2327	1 mile (1.6 km)		Several trees were twisted or uprooted and power lines were felled. The tornado also caused minor structural damage.
F0	NW of Chipley	Washington	FL	30°39′N 85°29′W	0037–0052	12 miles (19 km)		A relatively long-lived, but weak tornado caused minor damage to several homes. Several trees and power lines were also felled.
F1	NE of Bonifay	Holmes	FL	30°51′N 85°29′W	0055–0100	4 miles (6.4 km)		An F1 tornado destroyed one home and damaged several others.
F0	NW of Carrabelle	Franklin	FL	29°54′N 84°44′W	0115–0120	5 miles (8.0 km)		Numerous trees were uprooted between Carrabelle and Morgan Place.
F1	SE of Wilma	Liberty	FL	30°03′N 84°51′W	0130–0140	10 miles (16 km)		An F1 tornado tracked through the Apalachicola National Forest where it uprooted hundreds of trees.
F1	Dunnellon area	Marion	FL	29°03′N 82°28′W	0145	4 miles (6.4 km)		One home was destroyed in Dunnellon and numerous trees were uprooted. In Rainbow Springs, roofing material was reported to have fallen on roads.
F2	N of Blountstown to E of Altha	Calhoun	FL	30°30′N 85°03′W	0207–0218	7 miles (11 km)		4 deaths – A strong F2 tornado touched down near Blountstown and tracked northwestward. After crossing Highway 69, it damaged dozens of homes and uprooted trees. Shortly thereafter, it moved through the Macedonia Community where three trailers were destroyed and 30 homes damaged. Within the community, four people were killed and five others were injured after their mobile homes were thrown into other structures. The tornado subsequently dissipated near Altha. Overall losses from the event reached $2.5 million.
F0	Williston area	Levy	FL	29°23′N 82°27′W	0217	0.2 miles (0.32 km)		Brief tornado with no damage reported by emergency management.
F0	Bronson area	Levy	FL	29°27′N 82°39′W	0222	0.2 miles (0.32 km)		Brief tornado with no damage reported by emergency management.
F2	E of Marianna	Jackson	FL	30°43′N 85°10′W	0231–0250	8 miles (13 km)		The final Florida tornado on September 15 touched down east of Marianna and struck the Gold Drive Trailer Park. There, it destroyed 25 mobile homes and damaged 10 more. Three people sustained injuries in Gold Drive. Tracking northwest, the storm moved through the Brogdon Lane Trailer Park and damaged 10 more mobile homes and subsequently caused significant damage to the Marianna Federal Correctional Institution. The tornado then destroyed the Sykes Enterprises facility near Marianna Municipal Airport before dissipating. Overall losses from the storm reached $3 million.

=== September 16 event ===
List of reported tornadoes – Thursday, September 16, 2004
F#	Location	County	Coord.	Time (EST)	Path length	Comments/Damage
Alabama
F0	E of Troy (1st tornado)	Pike	31°48′N 85°57′W	12:25 a.m.	0.1 miles (0.16 km)	Brief tornado downed several trees.
F0	S of Clio	Barbour	31°41′N 85°37′W	12:56 a.m.	0.2 miles (0.32 km)	Brief tornado downed several trees.
F0	E of Troy (2nd tornado)	Pike	31°48′N 85°45′W	1:05 a.m.	0.1 miles (0.16 km)	Brief tornado downed several trees.
F0	E of Snowdoun	Montgomery	32°15′N 86°13′W	1:49 a.m.	0.1 miles (0.16 km)	Brief tornado downed several trees.
F0	E of Clayton	Barbour	31°53′N 85°19′W	3:05 a.m.	0.1 miles (0.16 km)	Brief tornado downed several trees.
F0	SE of Tuskegee	Macon	32°20′N 85°35′W	4:00 a.m.	0.1 miles (0.16 km)	Brief tornado downed several trees.
Florida
F0	NE of Lloyd	Jefferson, Leon	30°31′N 83°58′W	4:45 a.m. – 4:50 a.m.	5.5 miles (8.9 km)	A weak tornado touched down near Lake Miccosukee and tracked northeast, damaging two homes and destroying a shed. Numerous trees and power lines were felled by the storm.
F0	Steinhatchee area	Taylor	29°41′N 83°24′W	8:50 a.m.	0.2 miles (0.32 km)	A waterspout moved onshore near Steinhatchee and caused minor damage to several homes.
Georgia
F0	E of Williamsburg	Dougherty	31°29′N 84°03′W	6:30 a.m. – 6:33 a.m.	2 miles (3.2 km)	A weak tornado damaged several homes and felled many trees. A portion of Georgia State Route 133 near Pecan City was temporarily closed due to downed trees.
F0	S of Ambrose	Coffee	31°30′N 83°01′W	10:35 a.m.	2 miles (3.2 km)	A short-lived tornado damaged several homes and sheds. One mobile home was also blown off its foundation.
F1	NNE of Colbert	Madison	31°30′N 83°01′W	2:05 p.m. – 2:15 p.m.	7 miles (11 km)	An F1 tornado touched down near Georgia State Route 72 and tracked north-northwest towards a country club. There, five large homes sustained extensive damage. Twenty other homes were also damaged by the tornado before it dissipated near the Madison County High School in Danielsville. Overall losses from the storm reached $1.3 million.
F0	Paoli area	Madison	34°05′N 83°06′W	2:33 p.m.	1 mile (1.6 km)	A brief tornado destroyed one barn destroyed and damaged several homes.
F0	N of Yatesville	Upson	32°59′N 84°08′W	2:42 p.m.	0.1 miles (0.16 km)	Brief tornado caused minor tree damage.
F2	Franklin Springs area	Franklin	34°17′N 83°09′W	2:50 p.m. – 2:53 p.m.	2 miles (3.2 km)	Strong tornado struck the town of Franklin Springs, damaging or destroying 25 residential structures. Additionally, the local fire and police stations sustained damage. Overall losses from the storm reached $1.1 million.
F1	Red Hill area	Franklin	34°23′N 83°15′W	3:15 p.m. – 3:20 p.m.	3.5 miles (5.6 km)	A tornado damaged several homes and downed numerous trees and power lines.
F0	S of Griffin	Spalding	33°13′N 84°16′W	3:21 p.m.	0.2 miles (0.32 km)	Brief tornado touched down near the Griffin-Spalding Airport. Several large trees were significantly damaged and many others were uprooted. A few homes sustained minor roof damage.
F1	Tignall area	Wilkes	33°52′N 82°44′W	4:10 p.m.	7 miles (11 km)	Relatively large tornado, measured up to 500 yd (460 m) wide, caused significant damage in Tignall and Norman. A total of 23 structures were damaged along the storm's path to varying degrees. Numerous trees and power lines were downed, twisted, or uprooted. Additionally, a large communications tower was destroyed. Overall losses from the storm reached $1.5 million.
F1	SE of Fortsonia	Elbert	34°00′N 82°46′W	4:18 p.m. – 4:29 p.m.	7.5 miles (12.1 km)	Tornado touched down near Fortsonia and damaged a house. One person inside the house sustained injuries. Damage along the remainder of the path was confined to trees.
F1	NNE of Elberton	Elbert	34°13′N 82°49′W	4:38 p.m. – 4:40 p.m.	1 mile (1.6 km)	Brief tornado damaged trees and power lines.
F2	W of Franklin Springs	Franklin	34°17′N 83°16′W	4:45 p.m. – 4:53 p.m.	5.5 miles (8.9 km)	1 death – Strong tornado touched down west of Franklin Springs and damaged many buildings, vehicles, and trees. One person was killed after her car was hit by a fallen tree. A passenger in the car was also injured.
F1	WSW of Orange	Cherokee	34°44′N 84°22′W	4:55 p.m. – 4:56 p.m.	1 mile (1.6 km)	Brief tornado downed dozens of trees, many of which fell on homes and vehicles, resulting in four injuries. Six homes were damaged by the downed trees and losses from the storm reached $300,000.
F1	Reed Creek area	Hart	34°27′N 82°55′W	5:15 p.m. – 5:17 p.m.	1.5 miles (2.4 km)	Tornado downed numerous trees and power lines. One home was damaged by a fallen tree.
F1	Cornelia area	Habersham	34°31′N 83°31′W	7:30 p.m. – 7:33 p.m.	2 miles (3.2 km)	Tornado downed numerous trees and power lines.
F1	S of Altman	Screven	32°40′N 81°37′W	8:10 p.m. – 8:25 p.m.	6 miles (9.7 km)	Tornado bent or snapped numerous trees.
F1	NW of Sylvania	Screven	32°49′N 81°42′W	8:40 p.m. – 8:56 p.m.	7 miles (11 km)	Tornado bent or snapped numerous trees.
South Carolina
F0	N of Aiken	Aiken	33°36′N 81°43′W	1:56 p.m. – 2:08 p.m.	6 miles (9.7 km)	Tornado downed numerous trees along an intermittent track.
F1	NNE of Saluda	Saluda	34°04′N 81°44′W	3:00 p.m. – 3:12 p.m.	6 miles (9.7 km)	A barn was destroyed, while several mobile homes, two cars and several framed homes were damaged. One person was injured by the storm.
F0	SE of Laurens	Laurens	34°22′N 81°51′W	4:12 p.m.	0.5 miles (0.80 km)	Brief tornado downed a few trees.
F0	SSE of Townville	Anderson	34°31′N 82°52′W	5:25 p.m.	0.1 miles (0.16 km)	Brief tornado damaged a few trees.
F0	SE of Walhalla	Oconee	34°38′N 82°54′W	5:35 p.m. – 5:43 p.m.	5 miles (8.0 km)	Tornado downed several trees and power lines.
F0	W of Iva	Anderson	34°18′N 82°43′W	5:40 p.m.	0.1 miles (0.16 km)	Brief touchdown in an open field.
F1	Westminster area	Oconee	34°40′N 83°06′W	5:55 p.m. – 6:02 p.m.	4.5 miles (7.2 km)	A mobile home was destroyed and a few other homes were damaged by fallen trees. Numerous trees and power lines were also downed.
Source: Tornado History Project - September 16, 2004 Storm Data, NCDC Storm Events Database

=== September 17 event ===
List of reported tornadoes – Friday, September 17, 2004
F#	Location	County	Coord.	Time (EST)	Path length	Comments/Damage
North Carolina
F0	Waco area	Cleveland	35°22′N 81°26′W	5:05 a.m. – 5:06 a.m.	0.9 miles (1.4 km)	Several structures had their roofs blown off and numerous trees and power lines were downed.
F1	Stokesdale area	Guilford, Rockingham	36°11′N 79°59′W	10:09 a.m. – 10:25 a.m.	15.3 miles (24.6 km)	Tornado tracked through Stokesdale and caused widespread damage. Three homes were destroyed, nine were severely damaged and fifty-two others were affected. Seventy percent of the trees in a heavily wooded area near the town were snapped or uprooted. Continuing into Rockingham County, the tornado damaged several more homes and destroyed a double-wide trailer before dissipating.
F0	NW of Vass	Moore		1555	0.5 miles (0.8 km)	Damage to trees and power lines.
F0	W of Pittsboro	Chatham		1625	0.5 miles (0.8 km)	Damage to trees and power lines.
Virginia
F2	W of Collinsville	Henry, Franklin		1504	8.8 miles (14.1 km)	40 vehicles were damaged or destroyed at a factory which sustained significant damage. There was roof and tree damage at a subdivision. A residential garage was damaged by a fallen tree, and two semi-trucks were overturned. 4 people were injured.
F2	E of Stewartsville	Bedford		1612	3 miles (4.8 km)	A poorly constructed building was destroyed. Homes sustained roof damage and trees were downed.
F0	N of Straightstone	Pittsylvania		1724	0.3 miles (0.5 km)	Brief touchdown with no damage.
F1	NE of Rustburg	Campbell		1754	1.9 miles (3 km)	Many trees were downed, one of which crushed a car. Homes sustained minor damage, and a garage lost its roof.
F1	W of Thomas Terrace	Campbell		1759	3 miles (4.8 km)	Trees were snapped and uprooted and sheds were damaged. A trampoline was thrown 200 yards.
F0	N of Earlysville	Albemarle		1844	0.3 miles (0.5 km)	Brief touchdown with no damage.
F3	Remington area	Fauquier		1902	9 miles (14.4 km)	Several homes in a subdivision had their roofs torn off, and one home was shifted from its foundation. Garages and outbuildings were destroyed, and large trees were snapped and uprooted. Maximum structural damage was F2, as the F3 rating was based on a car that was lofted more than 75 yards over trees and power lines. Two people were injured.
F2	S of Stanardsville	Greene		1905	5 miles (8 km)	4 homes, a trailer and a mobile home were destroyed with over 50 structures sustaining damage. 3 people were injured.
F1	W of Mannboro	Amelia		1908	1.5 miles (2.4 km)	A garage was lifted off its foundation and had its roof removed. Trees were downed as well.
F0	E of Riverton	Warren		1910	0.5 miles (0.8 km)	Damage limited to trees.
F2	E of Fletcher	Madison		1912	8 miles (12.8 km)	A garage was destroyed and several homes were damaged. There was extensive damage to trees in the Rapidan Wildlife Management Area and Shenandoah National Park.
F2	Warrenton area	Fauquier		1912	8 miles (12.8 km)	Tornado damaged two subdivisions. Projectiles were speared into homes, trees, and vehicles. Large trees were snapped and uprooted.
F1	NW of Woodford	Caroline		1915	1.5 miles (2.4 km)	A cinder-block detached garage was destroyed, and a mobile home was destroyed by a falling tree. Two vehicles were damaged and trees were snapped. Several homes sustained minor damage.
F2	N of Opal	Fauquier		1924	13 miles (20.8 km)	Tornado caused severe tree damage and some structural damage.
F0	NE of Massaponax	Spotsylvania		1929	2 miles (3.2 km)	Minor damage to trees and a few homes.
F0	Fredericksburg area	Fredericksburg		1936	0.5 miles (0.8 km)	Brief tornado scattered some debris.
F2	Winchester area	Frederick		1939	5 miles (8 km)	A detached parking garage was destroyed, while three homes sustained roof damage and. A platform deck was blown away and an office trailer was overturned. Numerous trees were snapped and uprooted and outbuildings where damaged.
F1	E of Daffan	Stafford		1942	6 miles (9.6 km)	Damage limited to trees.
F1	Manakin area	Goochland		1950	1 miles (1.6 km)	Damage limited to trees.
F1	SW of Oakland	Louisa		1956	1.5 miles (2.4 km)	Two house trailers were blown into a creek. Numerous trees were snapped as well.
F0	Short Pump area	Henrico		1959	0.5 miles (0.8 km)	Minor damage to homes occurred, with shingles torn off and garage doors blown in.
F0	Holladay area	Spotsylvania		2005	0.1 miles (0.16 km)	Brief touchdown with no damage.
F1	W of Danton	Orange		2015	3 miles (4.8 km)	Two homes were heavily damaged and several trees were uprooted.
F1	S of Lovettsville	Loudoun		2020	12 miles (20.8 km)	A farmhouse, outbuildings and a horse barn were damaged or destroyed, and two horses were injured by debris.
F2	SE of Independent Hill	Prince William		2026	4 miles (6.4 km)	Tornado snapped or uprooted many large hardwood trees. Some of the trees fell on houses and other structures. A vehicle was moved several feet, and homes sustained roof damage.
F2	E of Everona	Orange		2028	7 miles (11.2 km)	A mobile home, horse trailer, and two silos were destroyed. A tree was thrown onto a house and a mobile home was destroyed
F1	N of Mitchells	Culpeper		2036	0.5 miles (0.8 km)	12 homes sustained significant damage and a shed was lifted from its foundation. Numerous trees were uprooted.
F1	SW of Winchester	Frederick		2037	9 miles (14.4 km)	Barns, outbuildings and a garage were damaged. One home was destroyed, and 100 others were damaged due to falling trees.
F0	N of Hanover	Hanover		2040	1 miles (1.6 km)	Damage limited to trees.
F1	Manassas area	Manassas, Prince William, Manassas Park, Fairfax		2040	3.5 miles (5.6 km)	Several structures and trees were damaged.
F0	E of Taylorsville	Caroline		2042	1 miles (1.6 km)	Damage limited to trees.
F1	S of Alanthus	Culpeper		2050	0.1 miles (0.16 km)	A house and its garage lost portions of its roof. Tree branches were snapped.
F2	Chantilly area	Fairfax		2055	7 miles (3.2 km)	One home was destroyed and 50 others were damaged. Many trees and power lines were downed and one person was injured.
F1	W of McDuff	Caroline		2111	1.5 miles (2.4 km)	Damage limited to trees, although one falling tree damaged one home.
F2	Dulles International Airport area	Loudoun, Montgomery (MD)		2112	8 miles (24 km)	Seven buildings were damaged and a tractor-trailer was overturned near Dulles Airport. A few structures were also damaged in Maryland.
F1	W of Port Royal	Caroline		2123	2 miles (3.2 km)	2 homes were heavily damaged and numerous trees were snapped.
F1	S of Fairview Beach	King George		2125	7 miles (11.2 km)	Frame homes were damaged by falling trees. A barn and two outbuildings sustained significant damage.
F1	SW of Oilville	Goochland		2134	0.2 miles (0.32 km)	Numerous trees were downed and a house lost part of its roof.
F0	NW of Durand	Greensville		2135	0.8 miles (1.3 km)	A few homes were damaged and trees were downed.
Pennsylvania
F1	NW of Wardfordsburg	Fulton		2030	0.5 miles (0.8 km)	A tractor barn was leveled, and a house roof and another barn were damaged. Tall grass and corn was flattened, and trees were downed.
F1	N of Worleytown	Franklin		2214	2 miles (3.2 km)	Damage to trees and several structures.
F1	E of Markes	Franklin		2228	2.5 miles (4 km)	Damage to trees and several structures.
F1	NE of Germantown	Franklin		2318	1.5 miles (2.4 km)	Damage limited to trees.
F1	SW of Tatesville	Bedford		2330	3.5 miles (5.6 km)	One home and some farm buildings were damaged. Extensive crop damage occurred at six farms. Many trees were downed as well.
F1	SE of Yount	Bedford		2340	2.3 miles (3.7 km)	Sporadic damage, including to trees and one barn.
F1	N of Oakville	Cumberland		2355	2 miles (3.2 km)	Damage to trees, farmhouses, and farm buildings occurred.
F1	S of Arch Rock	Juniata		0005	1 miles (1.6 km)	Damage limited to trees.
F1	NE of Arch Rock	Juniata		0010	4.5 miles (7.2 km)	Several structures were damaged and corn fields were flattened. Trees were downed as well.
Maryland
F1	N of Brunswick	Frederick, Washington		2110	4 miles (6.4 km)	In Frederick County, the tornado destroyed outbuildings and other structures. Other buildings sustained roof damage and trees were downed. In Washington County, the tornado downed more trees, some of which landed on homes.
F1	Poolesville area	Montgomery		2142	3 miles (4.8 km)	A few structures were damaged and trees were downed.
F0	N of Wellington Beach	Charles		2142	3 miles (4.8 km)	Damage limited to trees.
F1	Frederick area	Frederick		2154	7 miles (11.2 km)	Minor structural damage to a few homes. Windows were blown out, shingles were peeled off, and chimneys collapsed. Several trees were downed as well.
F2	N of Burkittsville	Frederick		2250	3 miles (4.8 km)	Major tree damage occurred at Catoctin Mountain Park.
West Virginia
F1	E of Tanco Heights	Jefferson		2240	2 miles (3.2 km)	Homes sustained roof and siding damage, and trees were downed.
F2	Darkesville area	Berkeley		2250	2 miles (3.2 km)	Several homes and businesses sustained significant structural damage. Tractor-trailers and vehicles were flipped, and 6 people were injured.
F0	Sleepy Creek area	Morgan, Washington (MD)		2334	1 miles (1.6 km)	Damage limited to trees.
Source: Tornado History Project - September 17, 2004 Storm Data, NCDC Storm Events Database

=== September 18 event ===
List of reported tornadoes – Saturday, September 18, 2004
F#	Location	County	Coord.	Time (EST)	Path length	Comments/Damage
Maryland
F1	Joppatowne area	Harford	39°26′N 76°22′W	2:40 a.m. – 2:43 a.m.	1 mile (1.6 km)	A short-lived tornado downed several trees and peeled the siding off a few homes. One of the trees fell on a home, causing extensive roof damage and breaking most of the windows.
F2	Pylesville area	Harford	39°42′N 76°22′W	3:00 a.m. – 3:10 a.m.	2 miles (3.2 km)	A short-lived tornado destroyed two mobile homes and damaged several other structures. Numerous large trees were also twisted or uprooted.
Source: Tornado History Project - September 18, 2004 Storm Data, NCDC Storm Events Database

== See also ==
- Tornadoes of 2004
- List of North American tornadoes and tornado outbreaks
- List of tornadoes spawned by tropical cyclones
- 2004 Atlantic hurricane season
