= Meteorological history of Hurricane Ivan =

Hurricane Ivan
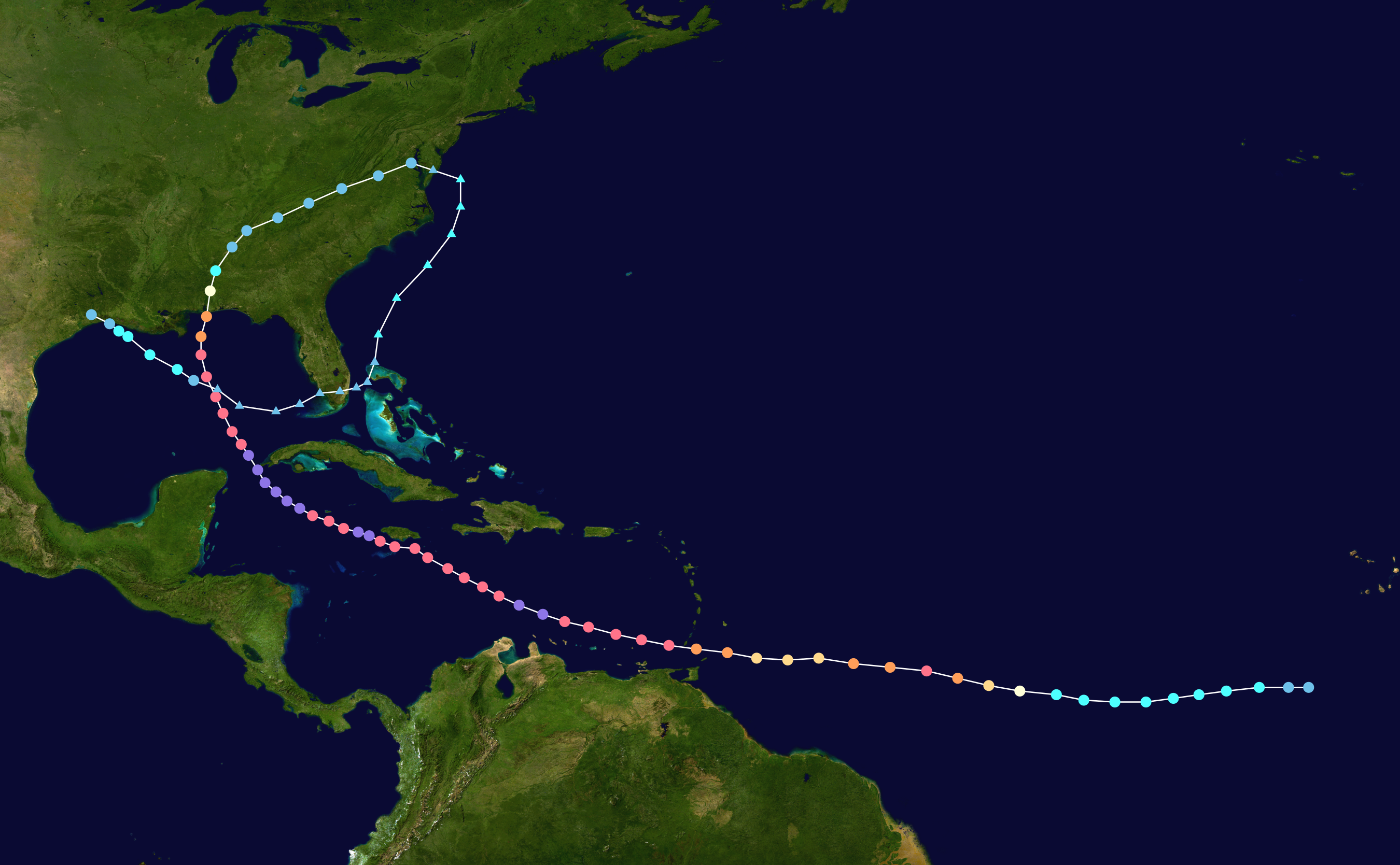
- Track of Hurricane Ivan, according to the Saffir-Simpson scale

Meteorological history
- Formed: September 2, 2004
- Remnant low: September 24, 2004
- Dissipated: September 25, 2004

Category 5 major hurricane
- 1-minute sustained (SSHWS/NWS)
- Highest winds: 165 mph (270 km/h)
- Lowest pressure: 910 mbar (hPa); 26.87 inHg

Overall effects
- Areas affected: Windward Islands (especially Grenada), Venezuela, Jamaica, Cayman Islands, Cuba, U.S. Gulf Coast
- Part of the 2004 Atlantic hurricane season
- History: Meteorological history; Effects: Tornado outbreak; Other wikis: Commons: Ivan images

The meteorological history of Hurricane Ivan, the longest tracked tropical cyclone of the 2004 Atlantic hurricane season, lasted from late August through late September. The hurricane developed from a tropical wave that moved off the coast of Africa on August 31. Tracking westward due to a ridge, favorable conditions allowed it to develop into Tropical Depression Nine on September 2 in the deep tropical Atlantic Ocean. The cyclone gradually intensified until September 5, when it underwent rapid deepening and reached Category 4 status on the Saffir-Simpson Hurricane Scale; at the time Ivan was the southernmost major North Atlantic hurricane on record.

Ivan quickly weakened due to dry air, but it gradually reorganized, passing just south of Grenada as a major hurricane on September 7. The hurricane attained Category 5 status in the central Caribbean Sea. Over the subsequent days its intensity fluctuated largely due to eyewall replacement cycles, and Ivan passed just south of Jamaica, the Cayman Islands, and western Cuba with winds at or slightly below Category 5 status. Turning northward and encountering unfavorable conditions, Ivan gradually weakened before making landfall just west of Gulf Shores, Alabama on September 16 with winds of 120 mph (190 km/h). The cyclone quickly weakened to tropical depression status as it turned to the northeast, and Ivan transitioned into an extratropical cyclone on September 18.

The remnant low of Ivan turned to the south and southwest, and after crossing Florida on September 21 it began to reacquire tropical characteristics. It became a tropical depression again on September 22 to the southeast of Louisiana, and Ivan reached winds of 60 mph (97 km/h) before weakening and moving ashore along southwestern Louisiana as a tropical depression; the circulation of Ivan dissipated after crossing into Texas on September 25. The cyclone broke several intensity records, and its duration was the tenth-longest on record for an Atlantic hurricane.

== Formation and intensification ==
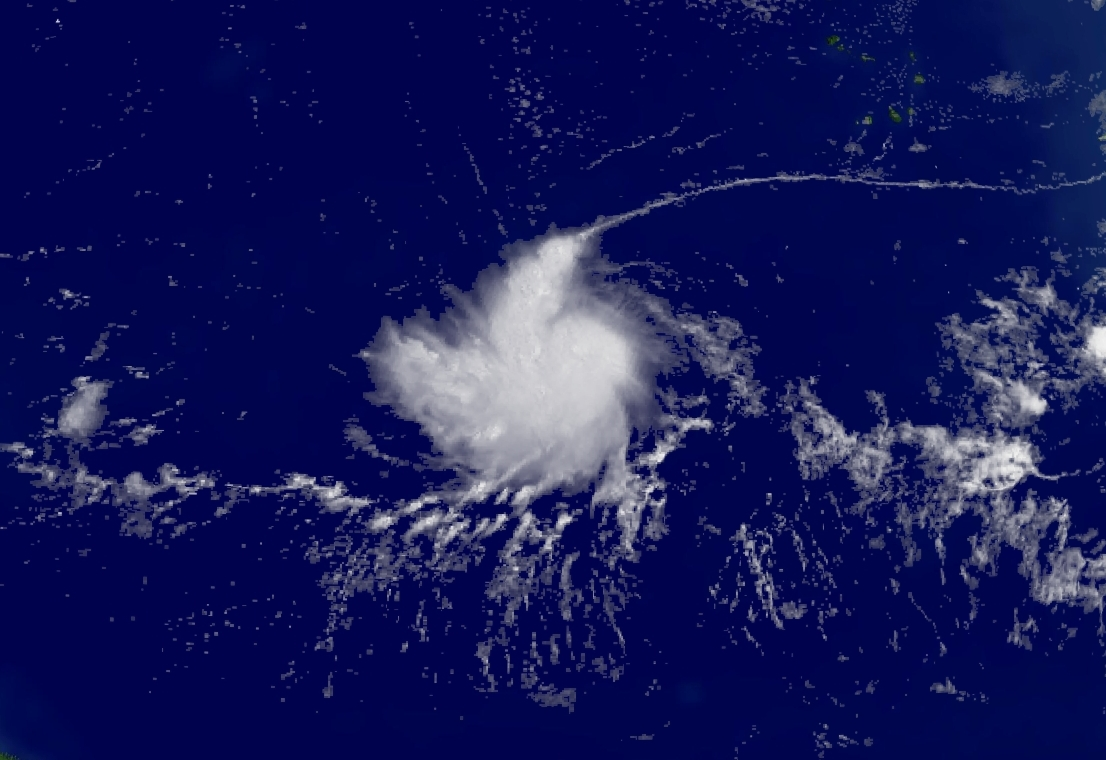
Tropical Storm Ivan after formation in the eastern Atlantic

On August 31, a large tropical wave moved off the west coast of Africa. A tropical system along the wave axis contained a low pressure area as well as an impressive outflow pattern, though initially its convection was disorganized and limited. By September 1 a cyclonic circulation with a diameter of 690 miles (1,110 km) was evident on satellite imagery, well to the southeast of the Cape Verde Islands. Several hurricane forecast models anticipated development and strengthening. As it tracked quickly westward, the convection organized and developed into rainbands – bands of showers and thunderstorms that spiral cyclonically toward the storm center – and late on September 1 meteorologists began tracking the system using the Dvorak technique. Low amounts of wind shear and favorable outflow allowed vigorous deep convection to develop and persist near the center, and by 1800 UTC on September 2 the system developed into Tropical Depression Nine about 450 miles (720 km) southwest of Praia, Cape Verde.

Upon being classified as a tropical cyclone, the depression was embedded within a deep easterly steering current provided by a ridge to its north. Expected to track across sea surface temperatures greater than 82 °F (28 °C), the cyclone was forecast to gradually strengthen and within four days attain hurricane status; the Geophysical Fluid Dynamics Laboratory predicted the depression to reach Category 4 status on the Saffir–Simpson Hurricane Scale within three days. Increased northeasterly wind shear shifted the center to the northeastern edge of the deep convection, and despite the shear and its relatively low latitude of 9.7° N, the depression strengthened to attain tropical storm status early on September 3; upon reaching the intensity, the National Hurricane Center classified the system as Tropical Storm Ivan.

Tropical Storm Ivan gradually became better organized as wind shear decreased, and its outflow expanded in all quadrants. Satellite imagery late on September 3 depicted a well-defined curved band wrapping around much of the circulation. The next day, the deep convection temporarily became ill-defined, before reorganizing and developing an eye feature. Convection strengthened further as the feature transitioned into an eye, and Ivan became a hurricane at around 0600 UTC on September 5. After reaching hurricane status, Ivan began to rapidly intensify with continued favorable conditions, and in an 18‑hour period the pressure dropped 39 mbar (1.15 inHg) as the winds increased by 60 mph (97 km/h); early on September 6 Ivan attained an initial peak intensity of 135 mph (217 km/h) while located about 825 miles (1,328 km) east of the island of Tobago in the southern Lesser Antilles.

While at major hurricane status, Ivan maintained very strong convection in its core with a well-defined eye. Operationally, the probability for further rapid strengthening was considered nearly nine times the average of a typical hurricane. Accordingly, Ivan was forecast to pass near Barbados with winds of about 150 mph (240 km/h). Shortly after attaining Category 4 status, the outer convection of the hurricane became ragged. Hurricane Hunters found a Saharan Air Layer in the northern portion of the eye, leaving the eyewall eroded which caused a marked decrease in winds; by late on September 6 Ivan weakened to winds of 105 mph (169 km/h). The inner eyewall dissipated as a 23-mile (37 km) outer eyewall became dominant, and concurrently the overall organization of the hurricane improved. Ivan again attained major hurricane status as it approached the Lesser Antilles, and at 2130 UTC on September 7 the cyclone passed 7 miles (11 km) south-southwest of the southern tip of Grenada, its closest approach to the island. At the time, the hurricane maintained an eye diameter of 12 miles (19 km), with the northern portion of the eyewall producing strong winds on the island. The hurricane brought strong winds to Grenada, and tropical storm force winds were reported as far north as Dominica.

== Caribbean Sea ==
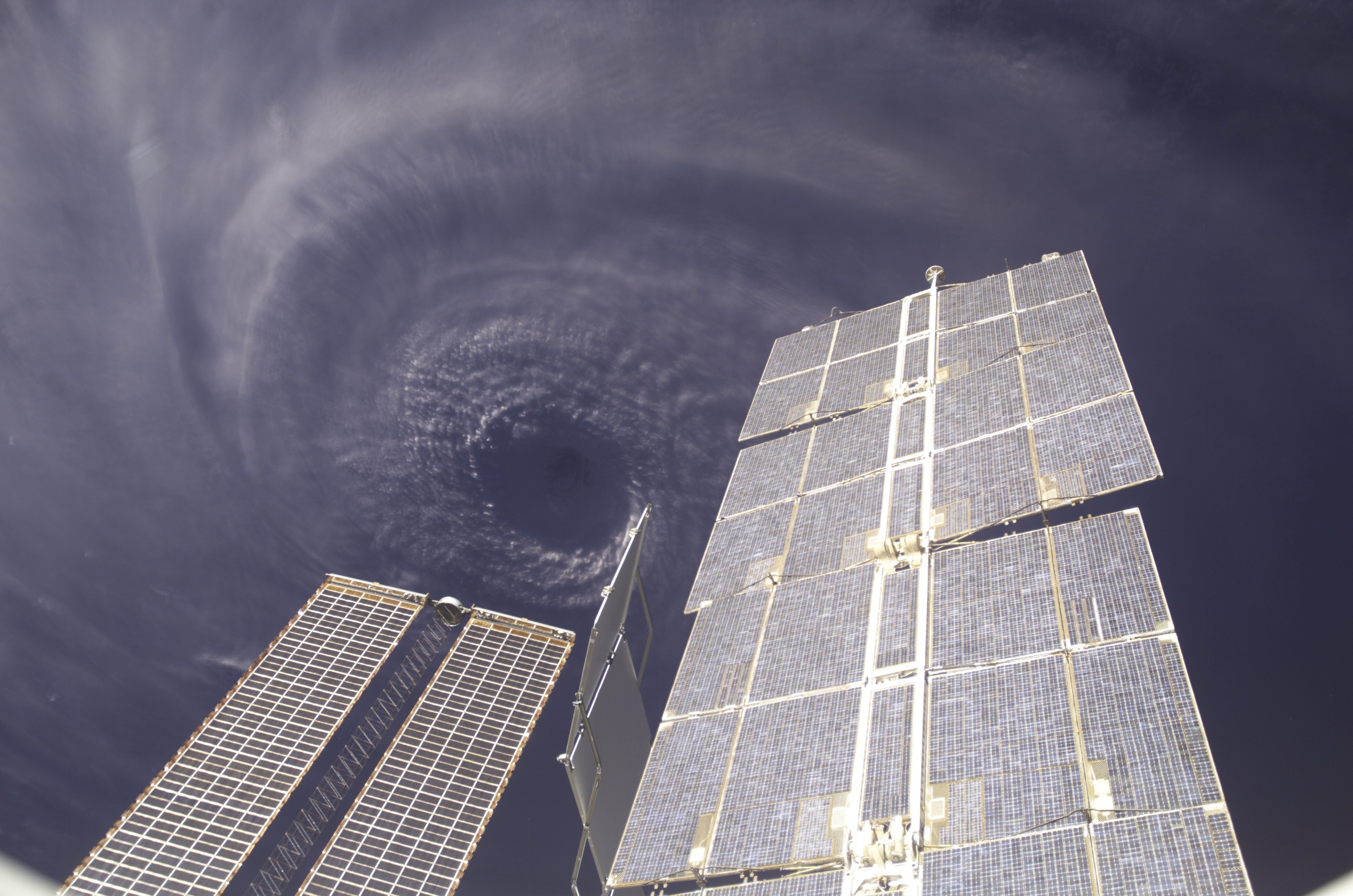
Image of Hurricane Ivan from the International Space Station

Hurricane Ivan again reached Category 4 status as it entered the Caribbean Sea. Subsequently, it underwent an eyewall replacement cycle, and for about 18 hours the intensity remained constant as it paralleled the northern coast of Venezuela offshore. Another period of rapid deepening began late on September 8 as its motion turned to the west-northwest. Hurricane Hunters recorded flight-level sustained winds of 180 mph (290 km/h) to the north and northeast of the eye, and a dropsonde about 630 feet (190 m) above the surface recorded winds of 200 mph (320 km/h) and an extrapolated pressure of 916 millibars (27.0 inHg). Based on the reports, it is estimated Ivan attained Category 5 status at 0600 UTC on September 9, while located about 90 miles (140 km) north of Aruba. At the time, the cyclone was forecast to strike southern Florida as a major hurricane.

After maintaining Category 5 status for about 12 hours, Ivan began a steady weakening trend due to another eyewall replacement cycle until reaching winds of 140 mph (230 km/h) on September 10. Early next day, the hurricane reorganized as it reached winds just shy of Category 5 status. However, weakening occurred again due to an eyewall replacement cycle, and at 0330 UTC on September 11 Ivan passed 23 miles (37 km) south of Portland Point, Jamaica, its closest approach, with winds of 150 mph (240 km/h). The hurricane was previously forecast to make landfall on the island, though the weakening and a turn to the west kept the strongest winds offshore; however, sustained winds of Category 4 status were reported. While passing to the south of the island, the hurricane dropped heavy rainfall, with several stations reporting over 2 feet (61 cm) of precipitation. Ivan's last-minute turn to the west was due to a mid-level high pressure system over the eastern Gulf of Mexico. A slight weakening trend continued after passing the island, due to its northern outflow being disrupted by an upper-level low over the Bahamas. As it tracked further away from Jamaica, Ivan again rapidly intensified to Category 5 status, and early on September 12 it reached its peak intensity of 165 mph (266 km/h) with a pressure of 910 millibars (27 inHg).

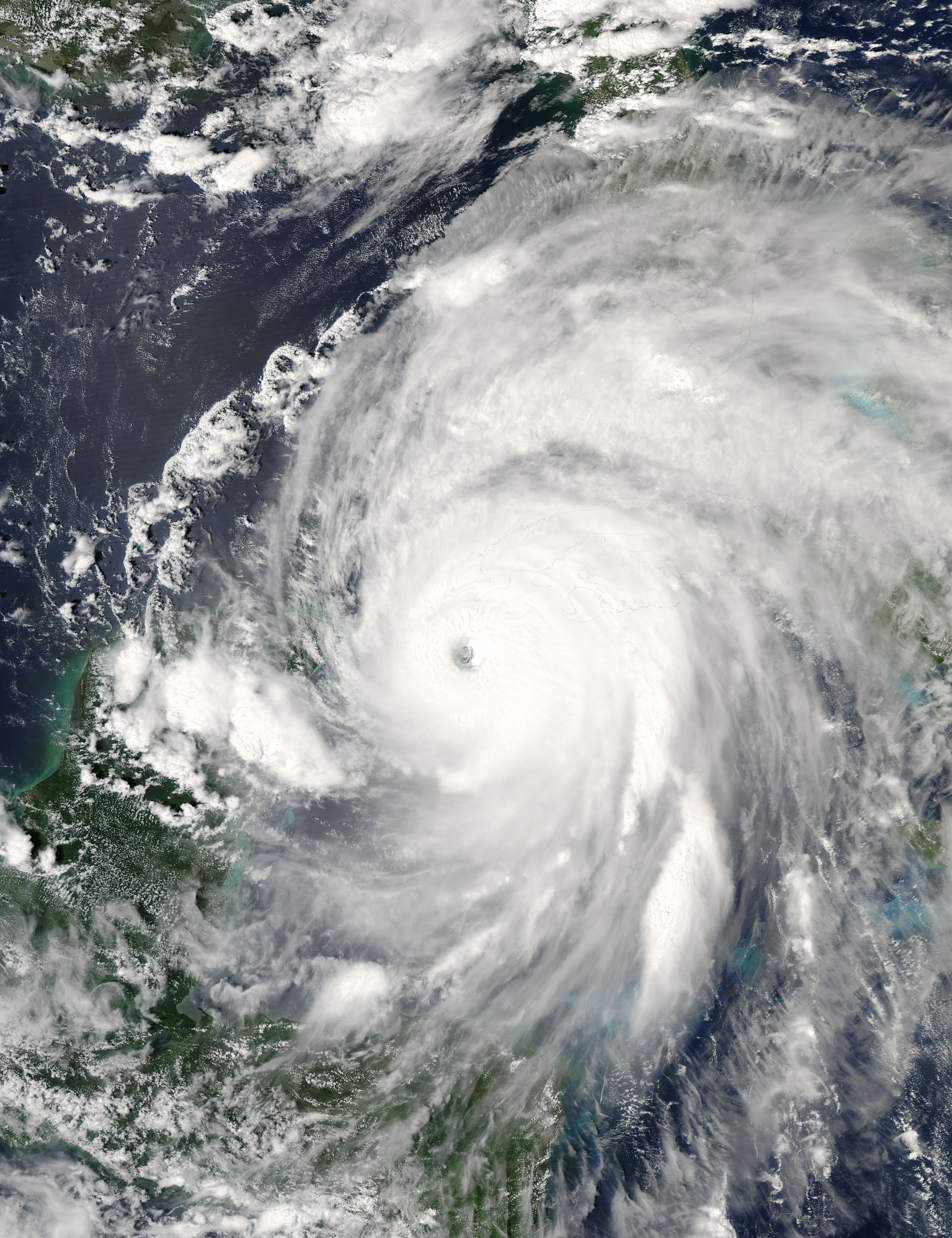
Hurricane Ivan on September 13, as a Category 5 hurricane.

Shortly after peaking in intensity, the hurricane again weakened as it underwent an eyewall replacement cycle. At 1415 UTC on September 12 Ivan passed 25 miles (40 km) south-southwest of George Town, Cayman Islands, where sustained winds of 150 mph (240 km/h) were reported. The storm surge from the hurricane flooded all of Grand Cayman. After its eyewall became re-established Ivan attained Category 5 status for a third time early on September 13. Shortly thereafter, a trough created a weakness in the ridge to its north, causing the hurricane to turn to the northwest. The combination of enhanced outflow from the trough and very warm waters allowed Ivan to maintain Category 5 status for 30 hours. Early on September 14 the hurricane passed through the Yucatán Channel about 17 miles (27 km) southwest of Cabo San Antonio, Cuba, with the eastern portion of the eyewall crossing the western portion of the island. Only the extreme western portion of the island experienced hurricane-force winds, although rainfall from the hurricane was reported across the island.

== Gulf of Mexico and Alabama landfall ==
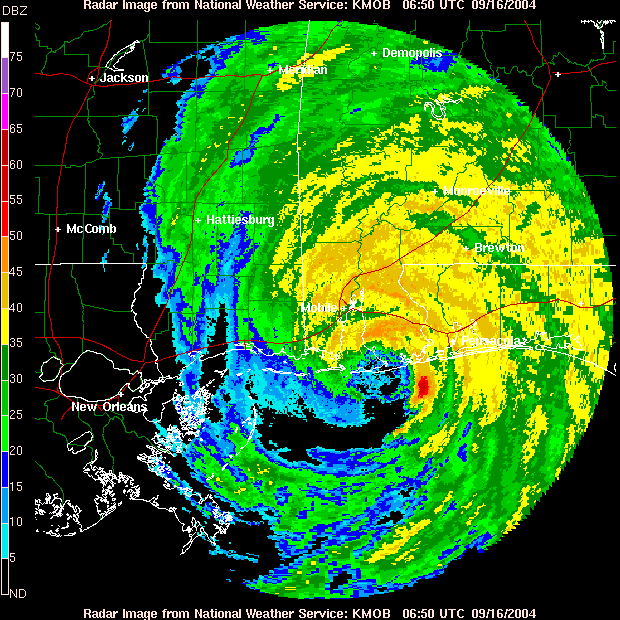
Radar image of Ivan near landfall

After entering the southern Gulf of Mexico, Hurricane Ivan weakened to Category 4 status by 0600 UTC on September 14. When Ivan entered the Gulf of Mexico, U.S. Naval Research Laboratory ocean-floor pressure sensors detected a freak wave, which was caused by the hurricane. The wave was around 91 feet (28 m) high from peak to trough, and around 660 feet (200 m) long. Their computer models also indicated that waves may have exceeded 130 feet (40 m) in the eyewall. As Ivan gradually turned to the north, southwesterly flow from a large trough over the central United States increased wind shear over the hurricane. An eyewall replacement cycle, along with dry air and restricted outflow, contributed to the weakening. By late on September 14, the weakening trend ceased as the eyewall became better defined, and Ivan was expected to restrengthen slightly over an area of warmer water temperatures. The eye diameter expanded to 60 miles (97 km)/h), though concurrently, westerly wind shear and dry air continued to increase. As Ivan approached the Gulf Coast of the United States, Hurricane Hunters reported erosion of the southern portion of the eyewall, and cooler waters just offshore contributed to further weakening. At around 0650 UTC on September 16, Hurricane Ivan made landfall just west of Gulf Shores, Alabama with an intensity of 120 mph (190 km/h); the strongest winds occurred over a narrow area near the southern Alabama and western Florida border. Its landfall was accompanied by a 10–15 feet (3.0–4.6 m) storm surge from Destin, Florida westward to Mobile Bay.

Upon moving ashore, the National Hurricane Center expected the forward path of Ivan to be blocked, and accordingly forecast the hurricane to stall in the southern Appalachian Mountains before dissipating. As the hurricane crossed Mobile Bay it turned to the north-northeast, and within twelve hours Ivan rapidly weakened to tropical storm status. The circulation became less-defined, and early on September 17, the cyclone deteriorated into a tropical depression over northeastern Alabama. Ivan accelerated to the northeast ahead of an approaching cold front, dropping heavy rainfall along its path and also producing a widespread tornado outbreak from Alabama through Maryland. Late on September 18, the remnants of Ivan transitioned into an extratropical low as it merged with the cold front over the Delmarva Peninsula.

== Redevelopment and demise ==
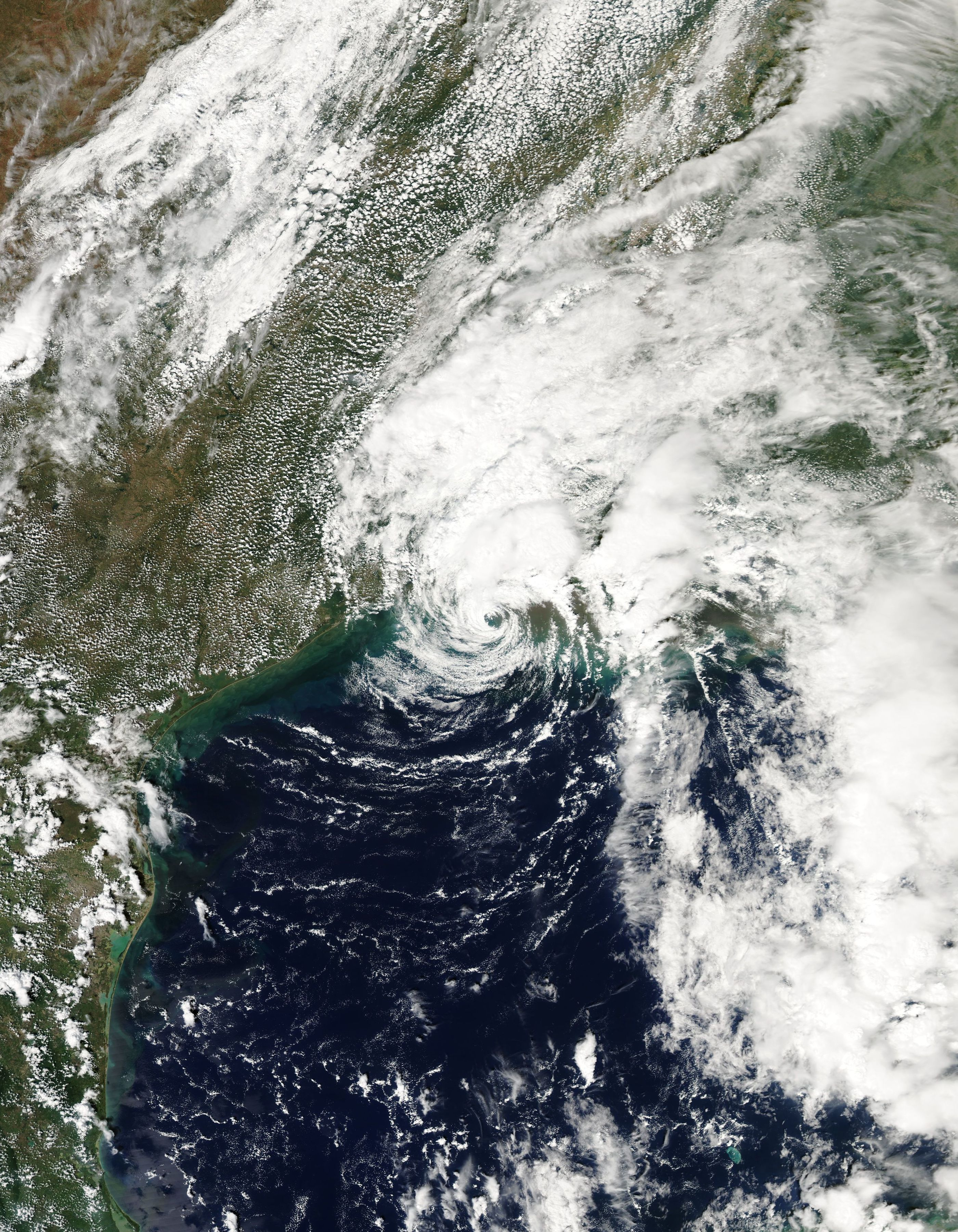
Tropical Storm Ivan near its second landfall on September 23

After becoming an extratropical low, the remnants of Ivan turned to the southeast and emerged into the Atlantic Ocean, due to the building of an upper-level ridge to its east. As an extratropical cyclone, Ivan remained identifiable in both surface and upper-level data, and the system turned south and southwestward over the subsequent days. By September 20, the system was located off the east coast of Florida, producing scattered thunderstorms; unfavorable wind shear prevented tropical redevelopment, though forecasters indicated the possibility for more favorable conditions a few days later. On September 21, the low crossed southern Florida and emerged into the Gulf of Mexico, and as it moved across the warm waters of the region, the low began to re-acquire tropical characteristics; the low-level circulation became increasingly better defined, and convection redeveloped over the center. Based on reports from Hurricane Hunters, it is estimated the low redeveloped into Tropical Depression Ivan late on September 22, while located about 175 miles (282 km) south-southeast of the mouth of the Mississippi River.

In its first advisory on the re-developed cyclone, the National Hurricane Center classified the system Ivan "after considerable and sometimes animated in-house discussion of [its demise]... in the midst of a low-pressure and surface frontal system over the eastern United States... based primarily on the reasonable continuity observed in the analysis of the surface and low-level circulation." Despite unfavorable shear and its disorganized cloud structure, the cyclone intensified to tropical storm status early on September 23, based on reports by Hurricane Hunters. As an area of deep convection developed over the center, Ivan reached winds of 60 mph (97 km/h), though the winds decreased as thunderstorm activity diminished. Ivan weakened to a tropical depression at 0000 UTC on September 24, and two hours later it moved ashore near Holly Beach, Louisiana. Initial computer models forecast the low-level circulation to turn southwestward and re-emerge into the Gulf of Mexico. However, the storm rapidly weakened over land, and by 1200 UTC on September 24, Ivan degenerated into a remnant low pressure area over southeast Texas. The low turned to the south and the circulation dissipated early on September 25. The remnant trough reached the northwestern Gulf of Mexico later that day, briefly producing scattered thunderstorms before it diminished.

== Records ==
Reaching Category 3 status on the Saffir–Simpson Hurricane Scale at 10.2° N, Ivan became the southernmost major hurricane on record. Additionally, the hurricane attained Category 4 status further south than any other North Atlantic hurricane, at 10.6° N. At the time, Ivan was the sixth-most intense Atlantic hurricane on record; it has since dropped to thirteenth. Throughout its duration, Ivan maintained winds of major hurricane status or greater for a total of 10 days, establishing an Atlantic hurricane record. Lasting as a tropical cyclone for a total of 450 hours, Ivan was the tenth-longest-tracked Atlantic hurricane on record.

Upon making its two landfalls in the United States, the hurricane spawned a total of 120 tornadoes, which is the largest tornado outbreak associated with a tropical cyclone; this broke the previous record of 115 set by Hurricane Beulah in 1967.

== See also ==
- Hurricane Ivan tornado outbreak
