= Alanthus =

Alanthus may refer to:

- Alanthus, Kansas, United States
- Alanthus, Virginia, United States
- Alanthus Grove, Missouri, United States
- Alanthus Hill, Tennessee, United States
