= Hurricane Ivan =

Category 5 Atlantic hurricane in 2004

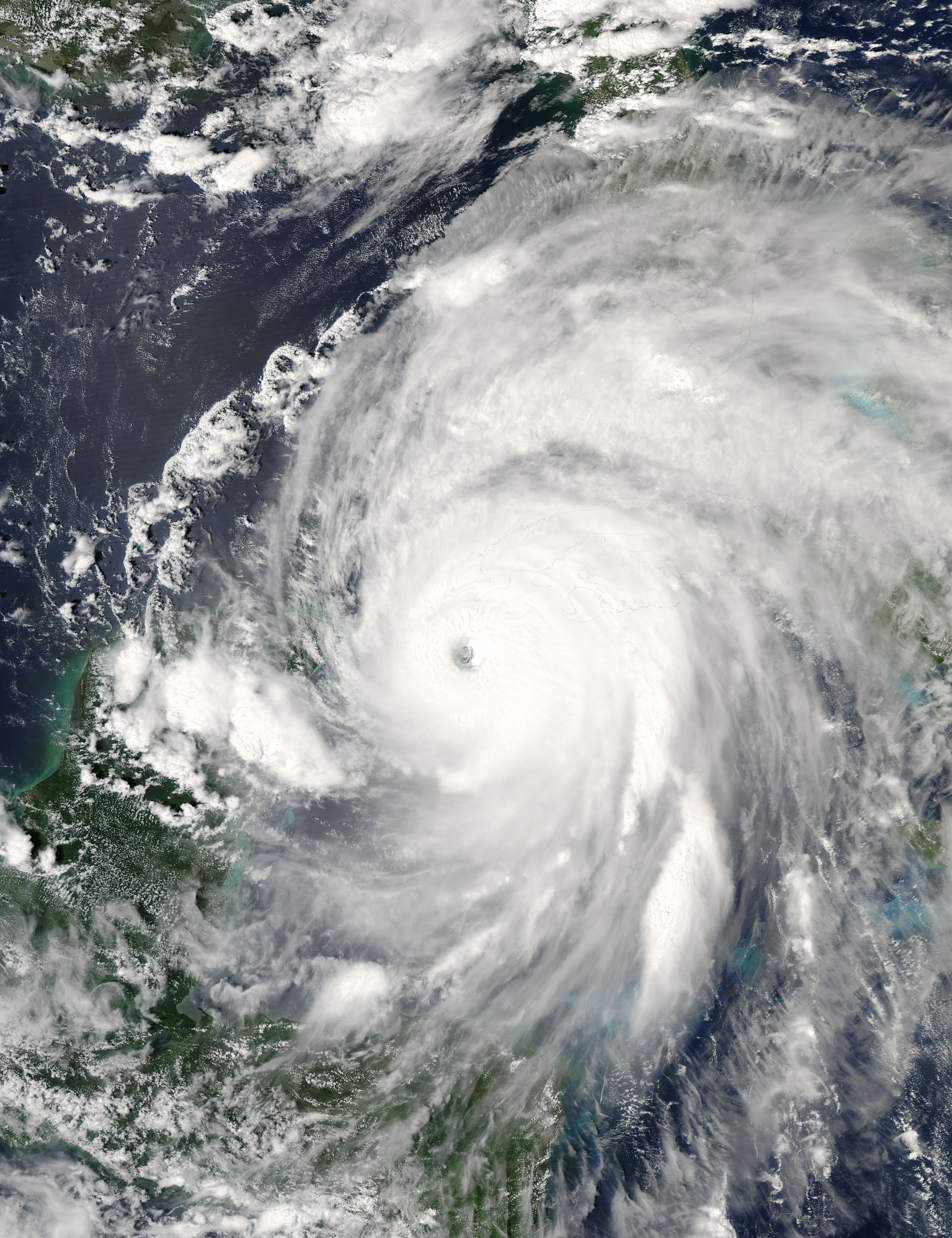
- Hurricane Ivan in the Yucatán Channel at its tertiary peak intensity on September 13

Meteorological history
- Formed: September 2, 2004
- Remnant low: September 24, 2004
- Dissipated: September 25, 2004

Category 5 major hurricane
- 1-minute sustained (SSHWS/NWS)
- Highest winds: 165 mph (270 km/h)
- Lowest pressure: 910 mbar (hPa); 26.87 inHg

Overall effects
- Fatalities: 124 total
- Damage: $26.1 billion (2004 USD) (Costliest in Grenada and Cayman Islands history)
- Areas affected: Windward Islands (especially Grenada); Leeward Antilles; Venezuela; Greater Antilles; Yucatan Peninsula; United States Gulf Coast; Eastern United States; Atlantic Canada
- IBTrACS
- Part of the 2004 Atlantic hurricane season
- History: Meteorological history; Effects: Tornado outbreak; Other wikis: Commons: Ivan images

Hurricane Ivan was a powerful, long-lived, and deadly tropical cyclone that caused widespread damage in the Caribbean and United States in September 2004. It became the most damaging hurricane to hit Grenada since Janet in 1955, when it passed just south of the island on September 7. The hurricane led to 39 fatalities and $1.1 billion in damage in the country. (Note: All currency totals are unadjusted for inflation.) On three occasions while traversing the Caribbean Sea, Ivan became a Category 5 hurricane on the Saffir-Simpson scale. On September 16, Ivan made landfall in the U.S. state of Alabama. Across the United States, Ivan left $20.5 billion in damage, which was the country's second-costliest hurricane at the time. The hurricane also killed 57 people, including 25 fatalities direclty related to the hurricane's impacts. While moving across the southeastern United States, Ivan produced the largest tornado outbreak associated with a tropical cyclone, with at least 118 confirmed twisters.

The hurricane originated from a tropical wave that exited western Africa. It developed into a tropical depression on September 2 in the open Atlantic Ocean as it moved westward. A day later, the National Hurricane Center (NHC) upgraded it to Tropical Storm Ivan, the ninth named storm of the 2004 Atlantic hurricane season. On September 5, Ivan strengthened into a hurricane, and later a major hurricane. (Note: A major hurricane is a storm that ranks as Category 3 or higher on the Saffir–Simpson hurricane scale.) Two days later, it traversed the Windward Islands. Three people died in northern Venezuela, and one person died on both Tobago and Barbados. While passing south of Hispaniola, Ivan killed four people in the Dominican Republic and another three people in Haiti. As a Category 4 hurricane, Ivan passed just south of Jamaica, where the hurricane killed 17 people. It subsequently passed just south of the Cayman Islands as a Category 5 hurricane, where Ivan killed two people. Ivan brushed western Cuba near peak intensity before entering the Gulf of Mexico.

Ivan weakened to Category 3 status before moving ashore the Gulf Coast of the United States, making it the strongest hurricane to hit Alabama since Hurricane Frederic in 1979. The highest wind gust in the state was 145 mph (233 km/h), recorded on a sailboat in Wolf Bay in Baldwin County. Nine people died in the state indirectly related to the hurricane. Ivan produced Category 3 hurricane conditions and a powerful storm surge in both Alabama and northwestern Florida. The storm surge peaked at 12.92 ft (3.94 m) at a station along the Escambia Bay Bridge. The surge and high waves destroyed portions of the bridge carrying Interstate 10, while also damaging other nearby roads and bridges. Across Florida, 27 people were killed, and another two people died in Mississippi. Ivan dropped heavy rain as it moved through the southeastern United States, peaking at 17.00 in (432 mm) in Cruso, North Carolina. The rains produced deadly floods and landslides, killing one person in Georgia, two in Ohio, and two in West Virginia. A boater died in Long Island Sound amid strong winds from Ivan, which transitioned into an extratropical cyclone on September 18 over Virginia. The remnant low turned southwestward and later back to the west. After re-entering the Gulf of Mexico, Ivan regenerated into a tropical depression on September 22, and briefly re-intensified into a tropical storm. It hit Louisiana as a tropical depression on September 24, and dissipated later that day.

== Meteorological history ==
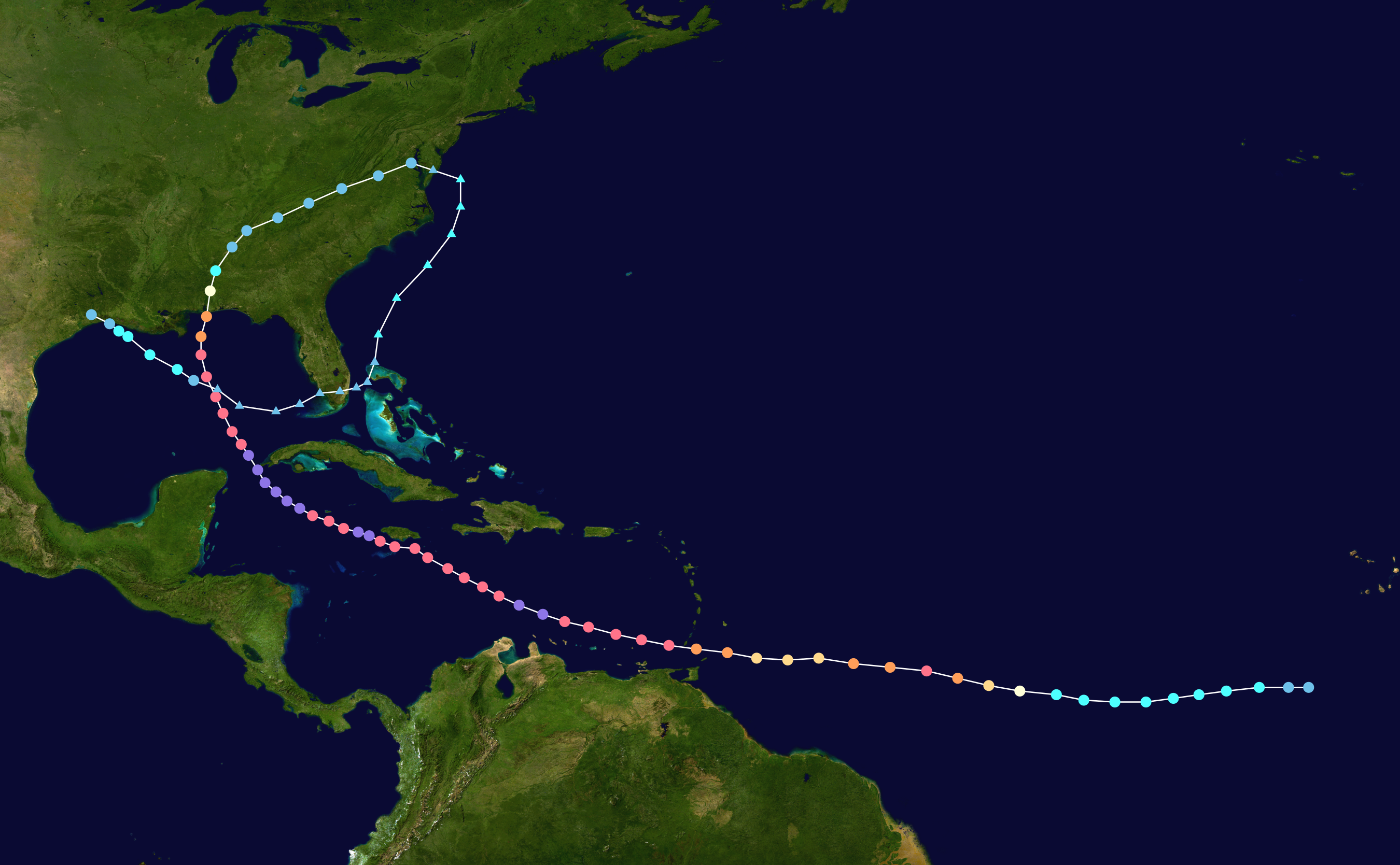
Map plotting the storm's track and intensity, according to the Saffir–Simpson scale Map key Saffir–Simpson scale Tropical depression (≤38 mph, ≤62 km/h) Tropical storm (39–73 mph, 63–118 km/h) Category 1 (74–95 mph, 119–153 km/h) Category 2 (96–110 mph, 154–177 km/h) Category 3 (111–129 mph, 178–208 km/h) Category 4 (130–156 mph, 209–251 km/h) Category 5 (≥157 mph, ≥252 km/h) Unknown Storm type Tropical cyclone Subtropical cyclone Extratropical cyclone, remnant low, tropical disturbance, or monsoon depression

The origins of Ivan were from a tropical wave, which developed into a tropical depression on September 2 to the southwest of Cape Verde. It moved westward and strengthened into Tropical Storm Ivan on September 3, the ninth named storm of the season by the National Hurricane Center (NHC). Two days later, Ivan reached hurricane strength while moving at a low latitude across the Atlantic Ocean, the sixth hurricane of the season. It intensified rapidly, becoming a major hurricane late on September 5, the fourth of the season. Ivan reached Category 4 intensity on the Saffir-Simpson scale at 00:00 UTC on September 6, but rapidly weakened due to dry air. On September 7, Ivan restrengthened and passed just south of Grenada with winds of 125 mph (205 km/h). After entering the Caribbean Sea, Ivan strengthened further and became a Category 5 hurricane on September 9, just north of the Netherlands Antilles. Two days later, the hurricane passed 23 mi (37 km) south of Jamaica. It fluctuated between Category 4 and 5 intensity in the Caribbean, reaching peak winds of 165 mph (265 km/h) and a minimum pressure of 910 millibars (27 inHg). The hurricane passed within 30 miles (50 km) of Grand Cayman on September 12, and two days later passed 17 mi (28 km) west of the westernmost tip of Cuba. Once over the Gulf of Mexico, Ivan weakened slightly as it turned to the north toward the Gulf Coast of the United States. At 06:50 UTC on September 16, Ivan made landfall at Gulf Shores, Alabama, as a Category 3 hurricane, with sustained winds of 120 mph (195 km/h). It weakened quickly over land, falling to tropical depression status over Alabama, and becoming an extratropical cyclone over Virginia on September 18. The remnant low of Ivan drifted off the U.S. mid-Atlantic coast into the Atlantic Ocean, turning southward and moving across Florida. It redeveloped into a tropical depression in the Gulf of Mexico on September 22, and became a tropical storm with a secondary peak of 60 mph (95 km/h). Ivan weakened before making landfall late on September 23 near Cameron, Louisiana as a tropical depression. It dissipated on September 24.

=== Records ===
On September 3, Ivan became the southernmost Atlantic hurricane at 9.5° N. Later that day, it became the southernmost major hurricane in the Atlantic at 10.2° N. Ivan was also the southernmost Category 5 hurricane at the time in the Atlantic, at 13.7° N, until it was surpassed by Hurricane Matthew in 2016. Ivan's duration as a Category 4 hurricane or stronger was longer than any other tropical cyclone on record, with a total of 198 hours. It was surpassed by Hurricane Ioke in 2006, which held the intensity for 216 hours. When Ivan was in the Gulf of Mexico on September 15, a tide gauge recorded a wave height of 91 ft (27.7 m). Because the gauge likely did not record the highest wave, researchers estimated that waves could have reached a height of 130 ft (40 m). It was the largest significant wave height in United States territorial waters, surpassing an observation in the Gulf of Alaska in January 1991. The hurricane also produced the fastest seafloor current, at 2.25 metres per second (5.0 mph; 8.1 km/h). After hitting the United States, Ivan produced the largest tornado outbreak associated with a tropical cyclone, with at least 118 confirmed twisters.

== Preparations ==
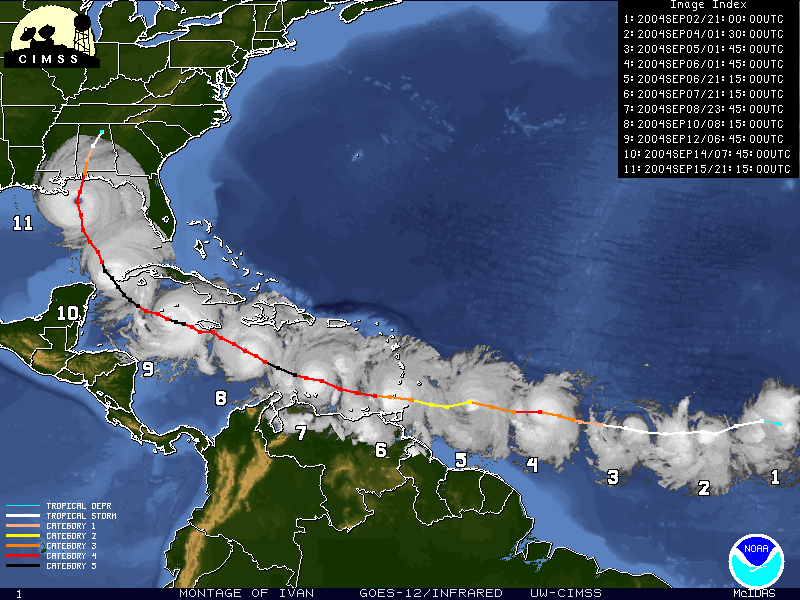
Satellite images of Hurricane Ivan in stages across the storm's path

=== Caribbean ===
Due to the threat from Ivan, the first tropical cyclone warnings and watches were issued on September 5. Hurricane warnings were issued from Trinidad and Tobago to Saint Lucia, including Barbados and Grenada. Tropical storm warnings were also issued for the northern coast of Venezuela through the Guajira Peninsula of Colombia. A hurricane watch was also issued for the ABC islands. Over 1,000 people evacuated to emergency shelters on Grenada, including hundreds in low-lying areas in the capital city. Some shelters were damaged during the hurricane, forcing the evacuees to go elsewhere. Overall, the population responded little to the official advisories and recommendations, which potentially contributed to the death toll on the island. More than 1,000 residents of Saint Vincent and the Grenadines evacuated to 28 emergency shelters. Barbadian officials closed schools and government buildings, opened shelters, and turned off the power grid as a preventative measure. Saint Lucia opened four shelters, and Tobago opened seven shelters, housing around 560 people. Schools, businesses, and airports closed in Trinidad and Tobago. Many schools and businesses were closed in the Netherlands Antilles, and about 300 people evacuated their homes on Curaçao. Oil refineries were closed in Curaçao and Aruba, while offshore production halted in Trinidad and Tobago. In Venezuela, thousands of people evacuated from coastal areas. Four airports closed in the country.

As Ivan progressed westward, hurricane warnings were issued for both Jamaica and the Cayman Islands. On September 10, Jamaican Prime Minister P.J. Patterson declared a public emergency. About 500,000 Jamaicans were told to evacuate from coastal areas. More than 1,000 shelters were set up across the country. About 2,600 British vacationers were flown away from Jamaica via the Dominican Republic. The national blood bank requested residents to donate blood, in anticipation of potential injuries. Air Jamaica canceled all flights to and from the island, as well as inter-island flights; aircraft were transported to the United States until the storm passed. Businesses in Kingston were closed, and fishermen secured their boats to trees. Residents in the Cayman Islands stayed in emergency shelters during the hurricane. A tropical storm warning was issued for the southern coast of Haiti, and a hurricane watch was issued for the southern coast of the Dominican Republic. Shelters housed about 4,000 people in Haiti. The World Health Organization and the Pan American Health Organization distributed four emergency kits to southern Haiti, capable of covering basic needs for 40,000 people. A flight from Port-au-Prince to Miami was canceled. The Cuban government issued a hurricane warning for the western portion of the country, including Isla de la Juventud. Throughout Cuba, 2,266,068 people evacuated due to Ivan, about 60% of whom to the houses of relatives. Off Mexico's Yucatán Peninsula, about 12,000 people evacuated from Isla Mujeres.

=== United States ===
As early as September 9, the NHC anticipated that Ivan would hit southern Florida as a major hurricane within five days. On September 10, Florida Governor Jeb Bush issued a state of emergency. The NHC first issued a tropical storm watch for the Florida Keys on September 12. A mandatory evacuation was issued for all residents and visitors of the Florida Keys, and about half of Monroe County residents evacuated the islands. The mandatory evacuations prevented the delivery of products, which caused widespread fuel and food shortages at commercial establishments.

After Ivan's threat shifted to the northern Gulf Coast, officials issued mandatory evacuations across the gulf coast, estimated at over 1 million people. Alabama Governor Bob Riley issued a state of emergency for the state on September 13. On September 14, the NHC issued hurricane watches for the northern gulf coast, and later that day issued a hurricane warning between from Grand Isle, Louisiana to Apalachicola, Florida. Evacuations along the Florida panhandle occurred as far east as Taylor County, leading to school closures. Mandatory evacuations were issued for coastal areas of Alabama south of Interstate 10, including parts of Mobile. All lanes on I-65 were rerouted to go north to allow for more drivers, known as contraflow. In Mississippi, evacuation of mobile homes and vulnerable areas took place in Hancock, Jackson, and Harrison counties. Around 600,000 people evacuated across southeastern Louisiana, including residents in Greater New Orleans who were advised to evacuate. The Louisiana Superdome was used for special needs residents unable to evacuate. Contraflow was used along Interstate 10 (I-10); however, there were still significant traffic jams, and four elderly women in Louisiana died during the evacuations. Ivan prompted the evacuation of 270 animals at Alabama Gulf Coast Zoo in Gulf Shores, Alabama to a zookeeper's house located 20 mi (32 km) inland. The hurricane also caused several sports matchups to be adjusted, including a soccer match in Tuscaloosa between the University of Alabama and the University of Alabama at Birmingham, a Major League Baseball series between the Florida Marlins and Montreal Expos, and the season opener between the Tennessee Titans and Miami Dolphins.

After Ivan reformed, a tropical storm warning was issued from the mouth of the Mississippi River to Sargent, Texas, which included areas that were under hurricane warnings six days earlier.

== Impact ==
Deaths and damage by country
Country	Total deaths	Direct deaths	Damage (2004 USD)	Refs
Barbados	1	1	$5 million	
Cayman Islands	2	0	$2.86 billion	
Cuba	0	0	$1.2 billion	
Dominican Republic	4	4	Unknown	
Grenada	39	39	$1.1 billion	
Jamaica	17	17	$360 million	
Saint Lucia	0	0	$2.6 million	
Saint Vincent and the Grenadines	0	0	$40 million	
Trinidad and Tobago	1	1	$4.9 million	
United States	57	25	$20.5 billion	
Venezuela	3	3	Unknown	
Totals:	124	90	$26.1 billion	

Along its path, Ivan led to 124 fatalities, either directly or indirectly related to the hurricane. The death toll in the Caribbean reached 64, mainly in Grenada and Jamaica. There were also 57 fatalities in the United States, including 25 directly related to the hurricane. Ivan produced more than $21 billion in damage, including $3 billion in the Caribbean, and $18.8 billion in the United States.

=== Southeastern Caribbean and Venezuela ===
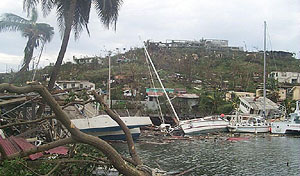
Aftermath of Hurricane Ivan in Grenada

Passing just north of Grenada, Ivan damaged or destroyed 85% of the structures on the island. The hurricane led to 39 fatalities and $1.1 billion in damage in the country, about 200% of its GDP. Several indirect fatalities occurred in the aftermath of the hurricane, primarily senior citizens. Ivan was considered Grenada's worst hurricane to strike the nation since Hurricane Janet in 1955. Ivan produced sustained winds of 120 mph (190 km/h), with gusts to 133 mph (214 km/h) at Point Salines International Airport. The airport also recorded 5.26 in (134 mm) of precipitation during the hurricane's passage. About 90% of the nation's houses were damaged, of which 30% were destroyed, with more than 14,000 homes impacted. Housing damage consisted of about 45% of the overall damage cost. About 18,000 people were left homeless by the hurricane, and about 700 people sustained injuries from the storm. The nation's emergency operations center was damaged during the storm. A 17th-century prison was damaged, which allowed about 150 inmates to escape during the height of the storm. In the capital city of St. George's, every major building was either damaged or destroyed, including York House, home of the Parliament of Grenada. The hurricane damaged or destroyed 75 primary or secondary schools, with only two left in working condition. All of Grenada was left without power or running water. An estimated 60% of hotel rooms were damaged, which adversely affected tourism. About 70% of the island's crops were destroyed, including the loss of 80% of Grenada's nutmeg, the country's main agricultural export.

On Tobago, one person died due to a falling tree. Wind gusts on the island reached 46 mph (74 km/h). Power outages affected 30% of the island, and at least 45 homes lost their roofs, leaving 22 people homeless. At least one home collapsed and fell into the ocean. Rainfall reached 16.2 inches (410 mm) on the island, producing mudslides. Damage on Tobago was estimated at $4.9 million. Damage in neighboring Trinidad was minimal. Wave heights from the hurricane reached 20 feet (6.1 m) along coastline portions of Saint Vincent and the Grenadines, which washed away 2 homes; the storm surge destroyed 19 homes and damaged 40 more. On Union Island, the winds damaged the roof of a hospital, while the northern portion of the island sustained heavy damage from the waves. Moderate damage was also reported on Palm Island and Carriacou and Petite Martinique. The winds left more than two-thirds of the island without power, and also damaged the island's banana crop. Damage in the country totaled $40 million. On Saint Lucia, three people sustained serious injuries. Strong winds and rough surf affected the southern coast of the island, damaging homes near the coast. Damage on the island totaled $2.6 million. The storm also damaged bananas on the island. In Dominica, winds reached 43 mph (69 km/h). High waves from Ivan caused light damage to southwestern Martinique and Guadeloupe.

In Venezuela, the hurricane killed three people, including two people who drowned and a man killed by a toppled wall. Along the northern coastline of Venezuela, the hurricane produced heavy precipitation and a storm surge of about 13 feet (4.0 m). The hurricane destroyed 21 houses and damaged 60 others, leaving 80 people homeless. The hurricane also caused water and power outages. While passing north of the ABC Islands, Ivan produced high winds, strong waves, and heavy rainfall, causing $1.1 million worth of damage. High winds blew away roof shingles.

=== Greater Antilles ===
While passing south of Puerto Rico, Ivan generated high waves that washed rocks and debris ashore the southern coast near Salinas. A portion of Highway 109 was closed for 12 hours at Las Ochenta due to debris. Along the southern coast of the Dominican Republic, high waves killed four people. Strong surf also affected the southern coast of Haiti, causing damage to the port and wrecking three houses at Jacmel. High waves killed one person, while two people drowned in floodwaters after refusing to evacuate their house. Heavy storm rainfall, which reached 72 mm (2.8 in) at Les Cayes, flooded irrigation channels along the Artibonite River in Haiti. Throughout Haiti, Ivan damaged or destroyed the houses of 2,500 people, mostly on the Tiburon Peninsula.

The center of Ivan passed just 23 mi (37 km) south of Portland Point, the southernmost point in Jamaica. On Pedro Bank, located southwest of Jamaica, an anemometer recorded winds of 133 mph (214 km/h) averaged over ten minutes, before the instrument stopped reporting. Doppler weather radar suggested winds of 112 mph (180 km/h) in Jamaica's mountainous peaks. Ivan dropped torrential rainfall across the island that damaged rain gauges in southern Jamaica. The highest total was 28.37 in (721 mm) in Ritchies, located in northwestern Clarendon Parish. Throughout Jamaica, Hurricane Ivan killed 17 people and left $575 million in damage. Hurricane-force winds affected the entire island, while heavy rainfall triggered mudslides and flooding. The storm destroyed 5,600 houses and damaged another 41,400, and most of the island's utilities were damaged. Overall, Ivan left 18,000 people homeless as a result of the flood waters and high winds. The storm was described as one of the most intense hurricanes in Jamaica's recorded history. Ivan caused severe damage, damaging and destroying houses, and triggering mudslides that washed out roads. In Kingston, the winds downed trees and poles and caused flooding. Waves flooded a causeway to an airport near Kingston. Some roads throughout the region were left impassible due to downed trees and utility poles. In Montego Bay, the Barnett River overflowed its banks; businesses were flooded with up to 4 feet (1.2 m) of water. Roads suffered flooding, and part of the A1 Road, the primary northern coastal highway, was washed away. Most of the major resorts and hotels fared well, and were reopened only a few days after Ivan had passed.

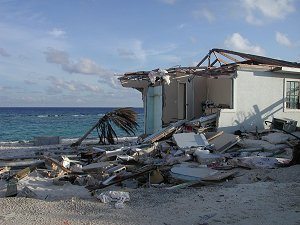
Damage from Ivan in the Cayman Islands.

As a Category 5 hurricane, Ivan passed just 25 mi (40 km) southwest of George Town, the capital of the Cayman Islands, on September 12. Sustained winds there reached 150 mph (240 km/h), with gusts to 171 mph (275 km/h). The 8 to 10 ft (2.4 to 3.0 m) storm surge, in addition to waves 20 to 30 ft (6.1 to 9.1 m) waves, submerged nearly all of Grand Cayman, except for the extreme northeastern portion of the island. Owen Roberts International Airport and several homes were inundated by the floodwaters from the surge. Rainfall also reached 12.14 in (308 mm) on Grand Cayman. On Cayman Brac to the northeast of Grand Cayman, Ivan produced wind gusts of 67 mph (108 km/h) and 4.92 in (125 mm) of rainfall. Two people died in the Cayman Islands, and damage in the territory was estimated at $3.5 billion, representing 183% of the territory's GDP. The strong winds damaged or destroyed 95% of buildings. Much of Grand Cayman still remained without power, water, or sewer services for several months later. After five months, barely half the pre-Ivan hotel rooms were usable.

The core of Ivan approached within 17 mi (27 km) of Cape San Antonio, the westernmost point of Cuba, which briefly experienced the edge of the eyewall. A station there recorded sustained winds of 110 mph (180 km/h), with gusts to 119 mph (192 km/h), before the instrument failed; peak gusts at the location were estimated at 168 mph (270 km/h). Hurricane-force winds affected Pinar del Río Province, while gale-force winds extended into Artemisa Province and Isla de la Juventud. A 6 to 12 ft (1.8 to 3.7 m) storm surge washed ashore the southern coast, causing flooding along the coast and in low-lying areas. Rainfall reached 13.33 inches (339 mm) in Isabel Rubio, and several areas recorded over 4 inches (100 mm). Throughout Cuba, Hurricane Ivan left $1.223 billion in damage. The storm caused widespread damage to crops, power systems, and homes. In Santiago de Cuba in the eastern portion of the country, heavy rainfall caused landslides. In western Pinar del Río Province, Ivan's strong winds shredded the roofs of several homes. The heavy rainfall flooded houses and farms, causing mudslides that cut off two houses.

=== United States ===
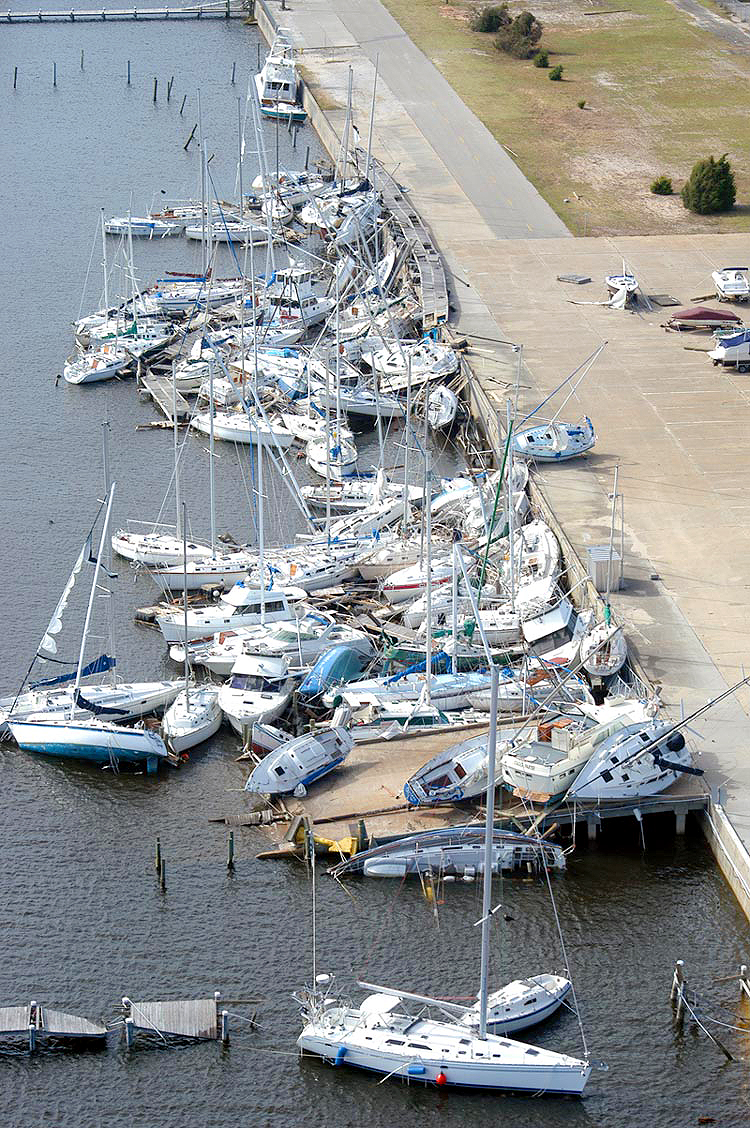
Hurricane Ivan sank and stacked numerous boats at Bayou Grande Marina at NAS Pensacola.

Throughout the United States, Ivan caused or contributed to 57 fatalities, including 25 deaths directly related to the hurricane's impacts. Nationwide damage was estimated at $20.5 billion, making it the second-costliest U.S. hurricane at the time, only behind Hurricane Andrew in 1992. Ivan produced an outbreak of 120 tornadoes from Alabama to Maryland, becoming the largest tornado outbreak associated with a tropical cyclone in the United States. The tornadoes caused at least eight fatalities and injured 17 people.

As it passed over the Gulf of Mexico off the coast of Louisiana, Ivan caused the destruction of Taylor Energy's Mississippi Canyon 20-A production platform, 550 ft (170 m) above 28 producing oil and gas wells drilled in water 479 ft (146 m) deep. Waves estimated to be 71 feet (22 m) caused tremendous pressures below the surface, causing a landslide that obliterated the platform. Hundreds of gallons of oil per day were still leaking onto the surface of the Gulf fourteen years later. The United States Coast Guard reported that the spill had been contained in 2019.

==== Alabama ====
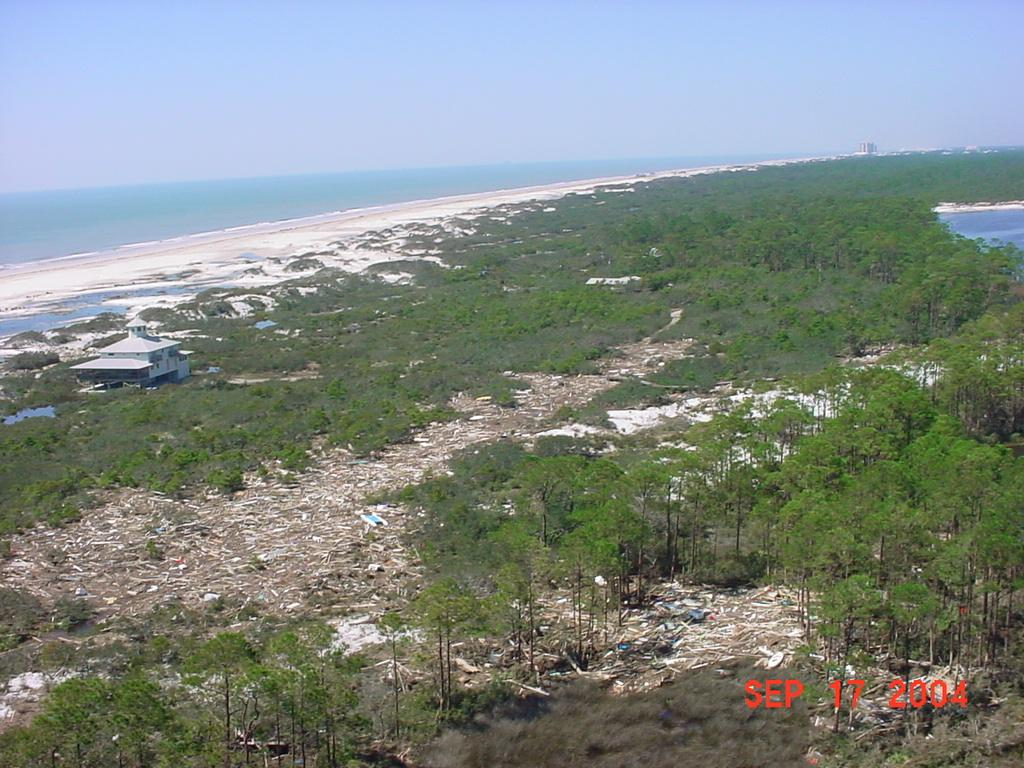
Damage from Ivan at the Bon Secour National Wildlife Refuge

Hurricane Ivan was the strongest hurricane to hit Alabama since Hurricane Frederic in 1979, which was a Category 4. Ivan brought strong winds, heavy rain, and storm surge to the state, although power outages prevented most wind observations from logging data. The highest wind gust was 145 mph (233 km/h), recorded on a sailboat in Wolf Bay in Baldwin County. The NHC estimated that the northeastern quadrant of Ivan's eyewall produced sustained Category 3 sustained hurricane-force winds over Perdido Key, based on Doppler-radar and flight-level observations. An apartment in Gulf Shores recorded sustained winds of 89 mph (142 km/h), the highest in the state. High winds extended far inland. The city of Demopolis, almost 100 miles (160 km) inland, received wind gusts of 90 mph (140 km/h). Similarly, Montgomery saw 60 to 70 mph (97 to 113 km/h) wind gusts. Ivan produced a storm surge ranging from 10 to 15 ft (3.0 to 4.6 m) high along coastal portions of Baldwin County. Rainfall from the hurricane peaked at 10.16 in (258 mm) near Silverhill. Around 6–9 in (150–230 mm) inches of rain fell in Birmingham over a one day period, the most the city had recorded in over 100 years. The lowest observed pressure in the state was 956 mbar (28.23 inHg) at Brookley Field in Mobile.

No lives were lost in Alabama from direct impacts; however, 9 people lost their lives from indirect impacts. Thousands of homes in Escambia, Baldwin County, and Mobile County were damaged or destroyed. In Orange Beach, 60% of all wooden structures were damaged. During the peak of the storm, 825,000 customers lost power. Major damage was reported at the Gulf Shore Zoo, and despite efforts to evacuate all animals, several deer and six alligators escaped after their enclosures were destroyed. The Alabama Forestry Commission reported $610 million in damage to timber over around 2,700,000 acres (1,100,000 hectares) of land. In Mobile strong winds downed trees, power lines, and damaged billboards. High winds caused damage to trees, power lines, and businesses in both Geneva and Coffee Counties. After the remnants of Ivan reemerged in the Gulf, it brought high surf to beaches on the coast, hindering cleanup efforts.

==== Florida ====
Throughout Florida, Ivan killed 14 people directly and another 13 indirectly. Although Ivan moved ashore Alabama, it produced Category 3 hurricane conditions across portions of extreme western Florida. The strongest winds in the state were at Naval Air Station Pensacola, which recorded sustained winds of 87 mph (141 km/h). A police department in Pensacola recorded wind gusts of 124 mph (200 km/h) at a height of 70 ft (21 m). Also in the city, the WEAR-TV station measured 15.75 in (400 mm) of precipitation, which was the state's highest rainfall from the hurricane. Ivan also produced a significant storm surge along Florida's west coast, estimated from 10 to 15 ft (3.0 to 4.6 m) from Destin westward. The west bank of the Escambia Bay Bridge carrying I-10 recorded a storm surge of 12.92 ft (3.94 m), the highest recorded along the northern gulf coast. High waves destroyed 3,500 ft (1,100 m) of roadway along both spans of the bridge. A trucker drowned after driving off the damaged bridge. The causeway carrying U.S. Highway 90 across the northern part of the same bay was also heavily damaged. Portions of U.S. 98 between Fort Walton Beach and Destin were also washed away. Ivan's high tides led to extensive beach erosion in the western Florida panhandle, while the heavy rains caused flash flooding and river flooding. Blountstown, Marianna, and Panama City Beach suffered three damaging tornadoes. A Panama City Beach news station was nearly hit by an F2 tornado. After Ivan regenerated in the Gulf of Mexico, high waves caused additional flooding, which disrupted cleanup efforts.

In Escambia and Santa Rosa counties – the two westernmost on the Florida panhandle – Ivan damaged more than 75,000 houses, which displaced about 50,000 people. In both counties, nearly every waterfront structure sustained damage, including several homes swept away. In Gulf County, high tides washed away four homes and caused several other buildings to be condemned. The hurricane's strong winds also knocked down many trees, causing at least $250 million in timber damage in the state. Two people along the Florida Panhandled died due to falling trees, and a child was killed by a tree limb while the tree was being removed. About 400,000 customers lost power along the Florida panhandle. There was heavy damage as observed in Pensacola, Gulf Breeze, Navarre Beach, and Pensacola Beach. Dwellings situated far inland, as much as 20 miles (32 km) from the Gulf coast, along the shorelines of Escambia Bay, East Bay, Blackwater Bay, and Ward Basin in Escambia County and Santa Rosa County, and Fort Walton Beach, Florida on the eastern side of the storm. The area just west of Pensacola, including the community of Warrington (which includes Pensacola NAS), Perdido Key, and Innerarity Point, took the brunt of the storm. Some of the subdivisions in this part of the county were completely destroyed, with a few key roads in the Perdido area only opened in late 2005, over a year after the storm hit. Shattered windows from gusts and flying projectiles experienced throughout the night of the storm were common. As of December 2007, roads remained closed on Pensacola Beach because of damage from Ivan's storm surge. Virtually all of Perdido Key, an area on the outskirts of Pensacola that bore the brunt of Ivan's winds and rain, was essentially leveled. High surf and wind brought extensive damage to Innerarity Point. High waves destroyed ten docks in Bay County. In Hillsborough Bay, tides were 3.50 ft (1.07 m) above normal, causing beach erosion. The hurricane produced a 1 ft (0.3 m) storm tide in the Florida Keys. On Key West, Ivan's outer rainbands produced wind gusts of 53 mph (85 km/h). The winds downed some tree limbs across the Florida Keys, adding to damage from previous hurricanes.

==== Southern United States ====
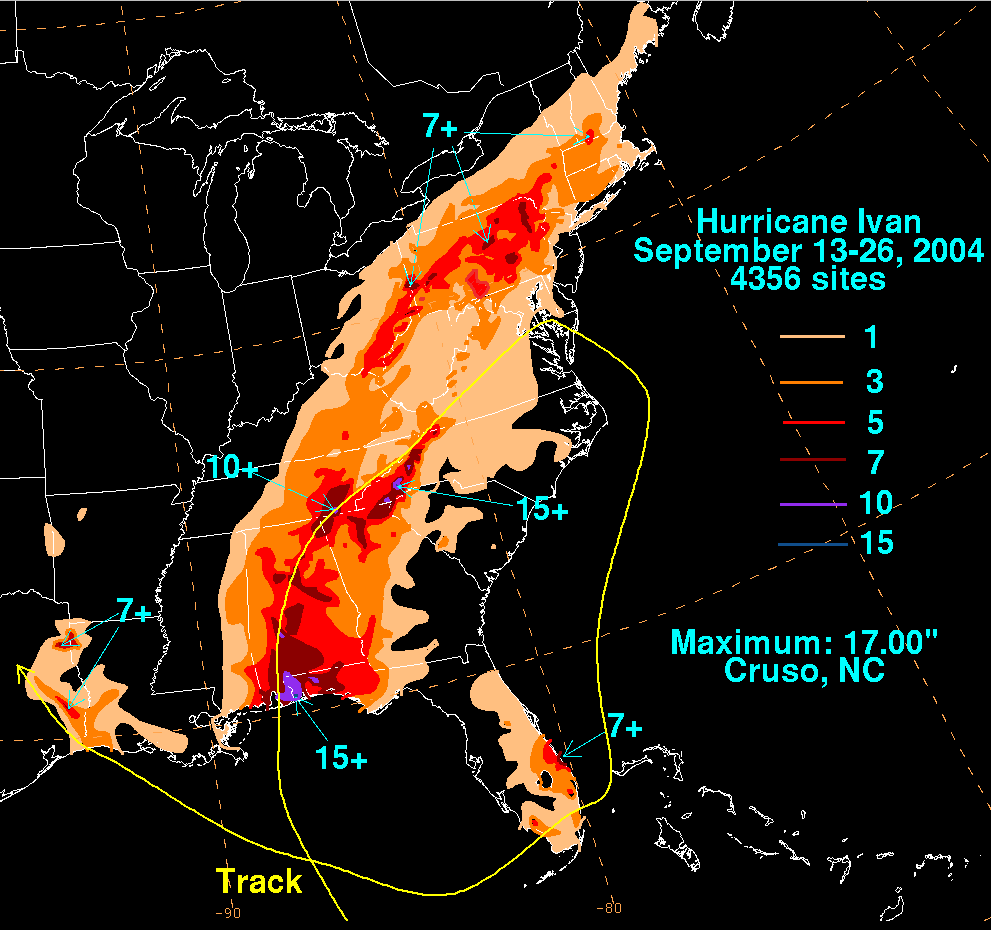
Rainfall in the United States caused by Ivan

Hurricane-force wind gusts spread across southeastern Mississippi, with a peak observation of 87 mph (141 km/h) recorded on the top of a two-story building in Pascagoula. The city also recorded Ivan's highest rainfall in the state, totaling 6.29 in (160 mm). The hurricane also produced a 3.4 ft (1.0 m) storm surge in Waveland, causing minor tidal flooding. The hurricane knocked down thousands of trees and hundreds of power lines across eastern Mississippi. A falling tree killed a man in Brooksville, and a man was killed in Lee County by a falling antenna. Hundreds of buildings were damaged by the trees or the winds. In Pascagoula, high winds blew the roof off an apartment building. Statewide damage was estimated at $200 million.

Ivan produced heavy rainfall in Georgia, reaching 13.65 in (347 mm) near Clayton. This added to the heavy rains from the remnants of Frances a week prior, causing record flooding along rivers and streams. In White County, a girl was swept away and killed by floods. Parts of Gilmer County had 500-year floods along the Cartecay River, washing away five mobile homes, parts of three bridges, and several vehicles. The Peachtree Creek in Atlanta crested at 22.7 ft (6.9 m), the highest on record, (Note: A flood in 1919 had an estimated 25.8 ft (7.9 m), before the tidal gauge was built.) forcing hundreds of nearby residents to evacuate. Schools and businesses closed across the Atlanta area after roads and highways were inundated, including parts of I-20 and I-285. The heavy rains damaged two roofs in Gwinnett County, including a distribution center where the roof collapsed. The floods produced several sinkholes, the largest of which measured 65 by 25 ft (20 by 8 m). At Six Flags Over Georgia, the floods inundated two roller coasters, resulting in $5 million in damage at the park. A strong rainband produced wind gusts of 80 mph (130 km/h) in Jackson County. Wind-driven tree damage caused two injuries, destroyed ten buildings, and damaged hundreds of buildings. Fallen trees left at least 230,000 people without power and blocked hundreds of roads. A man was killed in Towns County while repairing downed power lines. The winds also damaged hundreds of vehicles, traffic lights, a church, and a school.

The highest rainfall from Ivan in the United States was 17.00 in (432 mm), recorded in Cruso, North Carolina. Across North Carolina, Ivan damaged 5,127 homes, with another 78 destroyed. Eleven people died in the state due to Ivan. A landslide along Fishhawk Mountain generated a debris flow as fast as 33.2 mph (53.4 km/h). In Peek's Creek, the landslide killed five people and injured nine others after destroying 15 homes. Floodwaters caused five driving deaths across Buncombe and Henderson counties. Near Hendersonville, a man died after being struck by a fallen tree. Tens of thousands of trees fall across the state, damaging hundreds of buildings damaged by the falling trees. More than 210,000 people lower power statewide. Ivan's rains added to the precipitation from Frances nine days earlier, leading to creeks and rivers rising above flood stage. In Asheville, the French Broad River flooded downtown businesses. The Pigeon River had a record crest of 23 ft (7.0 m) in Canton. The floods washed away parts of several roads in western North Carolina, including portions of I-40, U.S. 19, U.S. 64, U.S. 276, and state routes 107, 209, 215, and 281, and bridges carrying state highways 194 and 197. Several communities issued evacuations due to the floodwaters. In Enka, 40 people required rescue when a motel flooded. In Swain County, the Little Tennessee River swept away 500,000 US gal (1,900,000 L) of raw sewage while also damaging an industrial park. Rockslides affected portions of I-40 and the Blue Ridge Parkway. About 40% of the downtown business district in Canton was damaged.

In South Carolina, rains reached 8.18 in (208 mm) in Longcreek. Several rivers and streams flooded, with several families in Oconee County requiring rescue by helicopter. High winds knocked down trees in the northern portion of the state, several of which fell onto homes or vehicels. Along I-77, strong winds overturned two tractor trailers. In eastern Tennessee, rainfall reached 11.25 in (286 mm) in Soddy-Daisy. Flooding closed roads and entered buildings in the eastern portion of the state. Strong winds knocked down trees and power lines, some of which fell onto buildings. Schools in Lawrence County were closed for a day due to roads blocked by trees. About 7,000 people lost power in Central Tennessee. The winds also caused about $1.7 million in agriculture damage, mostly corn stalks that were blown over. The Giles County High School sustained damage to its roof. Rains in Kentucky reached 6.26 in (159 mm) at the Greenup Lock and Dam near Lloyd. The rains caused minor flooding, damaging dozens of houses. In Carter County, flooding washed away a bridge. Residents in Greenup County along Tygarts Creek had to evacuate from the floodwaters.

Ivan's large circulation produced increased water levels as far west as Louisiana, with a 7.6 ft (2.3 m) storm surge recorded along Bayou Dupre. The surge flooded low-lying areas and roads outside of the areas protected by the New Orleans levee system. Ivan caused minor coastal flooding during its final landfall. Rainfall in the state peaked at 6.9 in (180 mm) in Shreveport. Wind gusts in the state reached 69 mph (111 km/h) in Pointe à la Hache. The hurricane damaged around 100 mobile homes, seven houses, and several public buildings. At least 55,000 people lost power statewide. Damage was estimated at $15.8 million, with the heaviest damage in Lower Plaquemines Parish. The storm also produced heavy rainfall across Texas, with a statewide peak of 7.86 in (200 mm) in Beckville. Rainfall in Arkansas reached 3.10 in (79 mm) in Midland. In neighboring Oklahoma, Calvin recorded 1.87 in (47 mm) of rainfall.

==== Elsewhere ====
Ivan's effects extended into Ohio, with a statewide precipitation peak of 8.53 in (217 mm) recorded in Albany. The rains caused flooded along creeks and streams in southeastern Ohio, leading to two deaths. There was drowning death near Barton, and a car crash amid heavy rains killed a driver along SR 7 in Jefferson County. In Bloomfield, the Little Muskingum River crested at 31.1 ft (9.5 m). The river washed out the historic Rinard Covered Bridge from 1874. In Marietta, the Ohio River rose 22 ft (6.7 m) over 24 hours, the greatest daily rise in water ever recorded at the station. Two trailer parks in the city were affected by the floods. The Ohio crested at 51.2 ft (15.6 m) in Pomeroy, with hundreds of buildings inundated. Across Ohio, flooding destroyed at least eight homes and damaged hundreds of buildings. Landslides destroyed a house and damaged several roads, closing a portion of SR 7. In Steubenville, a water treatment plant was damaged. Statewide damage totaled more than $38 million in damage.

In neighboring West Virginia, precipitation reached 7.68 in (195 mm) in Moundsville. There were two deaths in the state related to Ivan. Flooding swept away a truck in Marshall County, killing the driver. A man near Harts fell into a flooded creek and drowned. Significant flooding occurred along rivers and streams, including the Ohio, which had a peak crest of 51.3 ft (15.6 m) in Huntington. The floods triggered evacuations in the city. In Parkersburg, the Ohio crested at 43.7 ft (13.3 m), its highest in 40 years. Across the state, the floods damaged or destroyed 1,661 buildings, including several schools and businesses. Statewide damage totaled over $44 million. Several roads were washed out across the state, and portions of WV 2 were closed by mudslides from Weirton to Wheeling. The Barboursville sewage system was damaged amid the floods. Precipitation in Virginia peaked at 9.01 in (229 mm) at North Fork Pound Reservoir. The rains led to floods that damaged around 300 homes in the state, with 10 destroyed. The rains also covered roads and caused crop damage. In Maryland, the heaviest rainfall from Ivan was 3.02 in (77 mm), recorded near Frostburg. Several creeks overflowed their banks, leading to flooding. In Colora in northeastern Maryland, severe thunderstorms during Ivan's passage knocked a tree onto a house, killing two people. The rains in Delaware reached 4.23 in (107 mm) in Wilmington, leading to minor flooding along creeks.

The remnants of Ivan dropped heavy rainfall across Pennsylvania, peaking at 9.55 in (243 mm) in Rosencrans. Precipitation reached 5.95 in (151 mm) at Pittsburgh International Airport, setting a daily rainfall record there. The rains led to widespread flooding across Pennsylvania, damaging at least 21,000 buildings statewide. Widespread evacuations occurred because of the floods, affecting Allegheny, Cambria, Carbon, Indiana, Pike, and Susquehanna counties. Many rivers and streams in central Pennsylvania exceeded their banks, and two set records – Bald Eagle Creek reached 15.96 ft (4.86 m), and the Frankstown Branch of the Juniata River reached 19.46 ft (5.93 m). The combination of high rainfall and gale-force winds knocked down hundreds of trees across south-central Pennsylvania. In neighboring New Jersey, precipitation reached 6.32 in (161 mm) in Belvidere. The Delaware River crested to 33.45 ft (10.20 m) at the Easton–Phillipsburg Bridge. The river washed a home from Harmony Township into the bridge, causing the roof to fall off while the remainder was swept downstream. In White Township, dozens of houses were condemned due to floodwater intrusion. Damage in Warren County reached $36 million. Several cars stalled amid flash flooding in Hudson County.

In New York, the remnants of Ivan dropped heavy rainfall that peaked at 6.90 in (175 mm) in Roscoe. The rains caused streams and rivers to exceed their banks, including the Delaware, Susquehanna, and Chenango rivers. The Delaware swelled to 24.1 ft (7.3 m) at Barryville, causing the greatest floods along the river since Hurricane Diane in 1955. Statewide, more than 1,300 homes were damaged, including several trailer parks, with 26 homes destroyed. At least 2,200 people had to leave their homes, and seven people were rescued by helicopter. Floodwaters covered portions of I-86 and several highways in the New York City area. Several subways in Manhattan were submerged and closed. Nearly all of the roads in Port Jervis were affected by flash floods, resulting in a local state of emergency. The Esopus Creek produced landslides, erosion, and flood damage in Hardenburgh. A line of thunderstorms over Long Island produced wind gusts of 58 mph (93 km/h), which caused power outages after knocking down trees and power lines. In the Long Island Sound, a boater was killed when his trimaran capsized amid strong winds. The remnants of Ivan also dropped rainfall across New England, peaking at 4.49 in (114 mm) in New Haven, Connecticut. The rains caused flash flooding along I-95, closing the road and trapping several vehicles. In western Massachusetts, the Deerfield and Green rivers exceeded their banks and caused minor flood damage. In neighboring New Hampshire, flash floods inundated roads in Cheshire County.

=== Canada ===
On the morning of September 21, the remnant mid-level circulation of Ivan combined with a frontal system. This produced a plume of moisture over the Canadian Maritimes for four days, producing heavy rainfall totaling 6.2 inches (160 mm) in Gander, Newfoundland. High winds of up to 89 mph (143 km/h) downed trees and caused power outages in Newfoundland, Prince Edward Island, and eastern Nova Scotia. The system produced intense waves of up to 50 feet (15 m) near Cape Bonavista. The system killed two when it grounded a fishing vessel and was indirectly responsible for four traffic fatalities in Newfoundland.

== Aftermath ==
Due to its widespread impacts, the World Meteorological Organization retired the name Ivan in the spring of 2005, meaning it will never again be used in the Atlantic basin. It was replaced with Igor for the 2010 season.

=== Grenada ===
Several nearby countries assisted Grenada in its aftermath. The government of Guyana shipped about $250,000 (2004 USD, $40 million 2004 GYD) worth of sugar, as well as 100 members of the Guyana Defense Force to assist in restoring order and reconstruction. The government of Trinidad and Tobago sent 190 policemen, and the government of Anguilla sent 1,230 cases of water. A committee of Caribbean nations realized the local governments could not provide the support that Grenada needed in its aftermath, and thus turned to international assistance. Within a day of Ivan passing to the south of Grenada, the United States Agency for International Development (USAID) deployed 67,600 gallons of water, 500 rolls of plastic sheeting, four 10,000 liter water bladder kits, and a water treatment kit; assistance from USAID totaled $6 million (2004 USD) within a few weeks of the storm's passage, primarily in aid for reconstruction and rehabilitation. In the weeks subsequent to the hurricane, the European Commission Humanitarian aid Office (ECHO) provided €3 million (2004 EUR). By a year later, housing redevelopments and disaster preparation problems continued after being impacted by Hurricane Emily; as a result, the ECHO provided €1.2 million (2005 EUR) to Grenada in September 2005. China assisted with construction and handling foreign debts. The Caribbean Development Bank approved a $10 million loan (2004 USD) requested by the government of Grenada in July 2005, which was intended to assist in long-term development of the housing, business, and environmental sectors. Emergency operations in Grenada in coordination with the Pan American Disaster Response Unit ended in July 2005.

Within a few days after the hurricane passed, the Grenada Emergency Operations Center temporarily prevented relief supplies from entering the country to ensure the safety of the incoming items; the decision was reversed shortly thereafter, and planes flew supplies during daylight hours into the reopened airport. Severe looting occurred in the immediate aftermath of Ivan, prompting police officials to enact a curfew for the night hours. In the first week following the hurricane, aid was slow to the affected residents, due to the lack of an efficient aid distribution system. 30 official shelters and 17 prepared ones housed over 5,000 people in the aftermath of the storm. Thousands of people lost their jobs due to the hurricane, with all businesses shut down following the hurricane. By two months after the hurricane struck, 65 schools were opened, some of which serving as shelters; water and power were gradually restored to the island. By a year after the storm's passage, all schools were reopened, and most buildings enacted provisional repairs. Officials determined around 10,000 houses on the island required complete reconstruction, while a further 22,000 needed repairs. By June 2005, 192 houses had been rebuilt or nearly finished as part of a free housing program, helping around 3,000 families. The government also provided loans to 130 families for home rebuilding. More than $150 million was sent to Grenada in 2004 to aid reconstruction following Ivan.

Grenada suffered serious economic repercussions following the destruction caused by Ivan. The country's economy contracted by nearly 3% in 2004, compared to the projected growth of 4.7%. In October 2004, the government of Grenada also admitted that government debt, 130% of the island's GDP, was "unsustainable". The government appointed a group of professional debt advisors in January 2005 to help seek a cooperative restructuring agreement with creditors, a process that was completed in November of that year.

=== Barbados ===
The government of Barbados created a Hurricane Ivan Housing Recovery Project, which repaired or rebuilt 190 houses for people without the available funds; around 90 homes required minor immediate repairs, while the rest required significant reconstruction. The project finished in early 2006 for a total of $5 million (2004 BBD).

=== Jamaica ===
By two days after Ivan's passage, USAID's hurricane recovery program distributed emergency relief supplies for families who were displaced by the storm. During phase one of the recovery program, communities restored three tourist sites, cleared agricultural lands, and completed disaster mitigation. In addition, the U.S. Peace Corps completed thirty small projects in rural communities and low income neighborhoods. 66 health clinics, 25 schools, and 62 water and sanitation systems were repaired during the first phase of recovery. About 1,379 farmers, herders and micro businesses became eligible for grants. By 2005, 55 schools and colleges were repaired, while restoration of 1,560 houses had occurred. In the aftermath of the storm, looters were reported roaming the streets of Jamaica's capital city, Kingston, robbing emergency workers at gunpoint.

=== United States ===
On September 27, 2004, President of the United States George W. Bush submitted a budget to the United States Congress which requested over $7 billion in aid to victims of Hurricane Ivan and Jeanne in the following states: Alabama, Florida, Georgia, Louisiana, Mississippi, North Carolina, Ohio, Pennsylvania, and West Virginia. Over half of the $7 billion was to cover uninsured damage to property and public infrastructure. $889 million was spent to repair Department of Defense facilities. About $600 million was earmarked for emergency repairs to highways and road damaged by Hurricanes Charley, Frances, Ivan, and Jeanne. The Small Business Administration (SBA) used $472 million to provide loans for small businesses and homeowners affected by the storm. Approximately $400 million was given by the United States Department of Agriculture to provide financial assistance agricultural producers suffering crop and other losses. Around $132 million was used to repair Federal facilities by several government agencies, including: United States Coast Guard, Federal Bureau of Prisons, the United States Forest Service, and the Federal Aviation Administration. The United States Army Corps of Engineers used $81 million for restoration of coastal areas affected by Ivan. In addition, $50 million of which was for disaster and famine assistance funds Grenada, Jamaica, and Haiti.

Following the storm in Alabama, more than 167,700 people applied for assistance in 65 counties in the state. Over 51 counties in the state became eligible for public assistance. As a result, the U.S. Department of Homeland Security's Federal Emergency Management Agency (FEMA) and the Alabama Emergency Management Agency (AEMA) received $735 million, which was spent in disaster assistance, and included: low-interest loans for homeowners and businesses, disaster food stamps, Disaster Unemployment Assistance to those left unemployed as a result of Ivan, "Project Rebound", and to fill the 5,856 National Flood Insurance Program claims. In addition, there were repairs to public infrastructure such as roads, bridges, buildings, utilities, facilities, and parks. 20 Disaster Recovery Centers were opened in 13 counties, which also included the Poarch Creek Indian Reservation. Almost 4,000 linemen were brought into Alabama from outside states to help restore power. Overall, FEMA paid 90% of the $735 million, while the AEMA paid for the other 10%.

Governor Jeb Bush deployed about 2,000 members of the Florida National Guard to distribute food, water, and other supplies. A day after Ivan's landfall, officials signed contracts to replace the damaged bridge over Escambia Bay carrying I-10. The westbound portion was closed for 17 days, and the eastbound portion for 63 days. In 2007, a newer, higher bridge replaced the original structures. After Hurricane Ivan, 4,500 personnel were deployed in Florida, with 3,339 patients being treated, 2.96 million meals distributed, 56 shelters were set up, and $157 million in grants were given. They also completed over 104,000 housing inspections and distributed 97,700 tarps. Ten days after Ivan affected Florida, Hurricane Jeanne struck the state, causing additional damage.

Ivan is suspected of bringing spores of soybean rust from Venezuela into the United States, the first ever occurrences of soybean rust found in North America. Since the Florida soybean crop had already been mostly harvested, economic damage was limited. Some of the most severe outbreaks in South America have been known to reduce soybean crop yields by half or more. Following the storm, more than 138,500 residents in 15 counties of the Florida Panhandle applied for federal and state aid. In those counties, a total of $162.6 million was approved by FEMA's Individuals and Households Program. In addition, residents of 24 other counties in Florida were eligible for grants and loans. By September 2005, more than $1.4 billion in federal and state assistance was approved for residents and communities in the Florida Panhandle. In addition, the National Flood Insurance Program paid nearly $869 million for more than 9,800 insurance claims after Ivan.

More than $4 million in disaster assistance was approved for Mississippi by FEMA and the Mississippi Emergency Management Agency (MEMA). In addition, the SBA issued nearly 3,000 applications for low-interest loans to homeowners, renters, landlords, businesses, and non-profit organizations. The loans covered up to $200,000 in real estate repairs/replacements and up to $40,000 in repairs/replacements of personal property.

Residents and business owners in eight parishes of Louisiana became eligible for disaster assistance. By one week before the deadline to apply on November 15, 2004, about 9,527 residents applied for disaster assistance. Overall, FEMA and the Government of Louisiana provided more than $3.8 million to those that requested assistance. In addition, the SBA also allowed applications for loans to repair personal property until that day.

On September 26, 2006, over two years after Ivan struck the region, funding for the last 501 FEMA-provided trailers ran out for those living in Santa Rosa and Escambia counties.

== See also ==
- List of Category 5 Atlantic hurricanes
- List of Cuba hurricanes
- List of Florida hurricanes (2000–present)
- List of North Carolina hurricanes (2000–present)
- List of wettest tropical cyclones in the United States
