= McDuff, Virginia =

Unincorporated community in Virginia, United States

Coordinates: 37°57′20″N 77°27′39″W

McDuff is an unincorporated community in Caroline County, in the U.S. state of Virginia.
