= Daffan, Virginia =

Unincorporated community in Virginia, US

Coordinates: 38°21′24″N 77°24′29″W

Daffan is an unincorporated community in Stafford County, in the U.S. state of Virginia.
