= Alanthus, Virginia =

Unincorporated community in Virginia, United States

- Unincorporated region
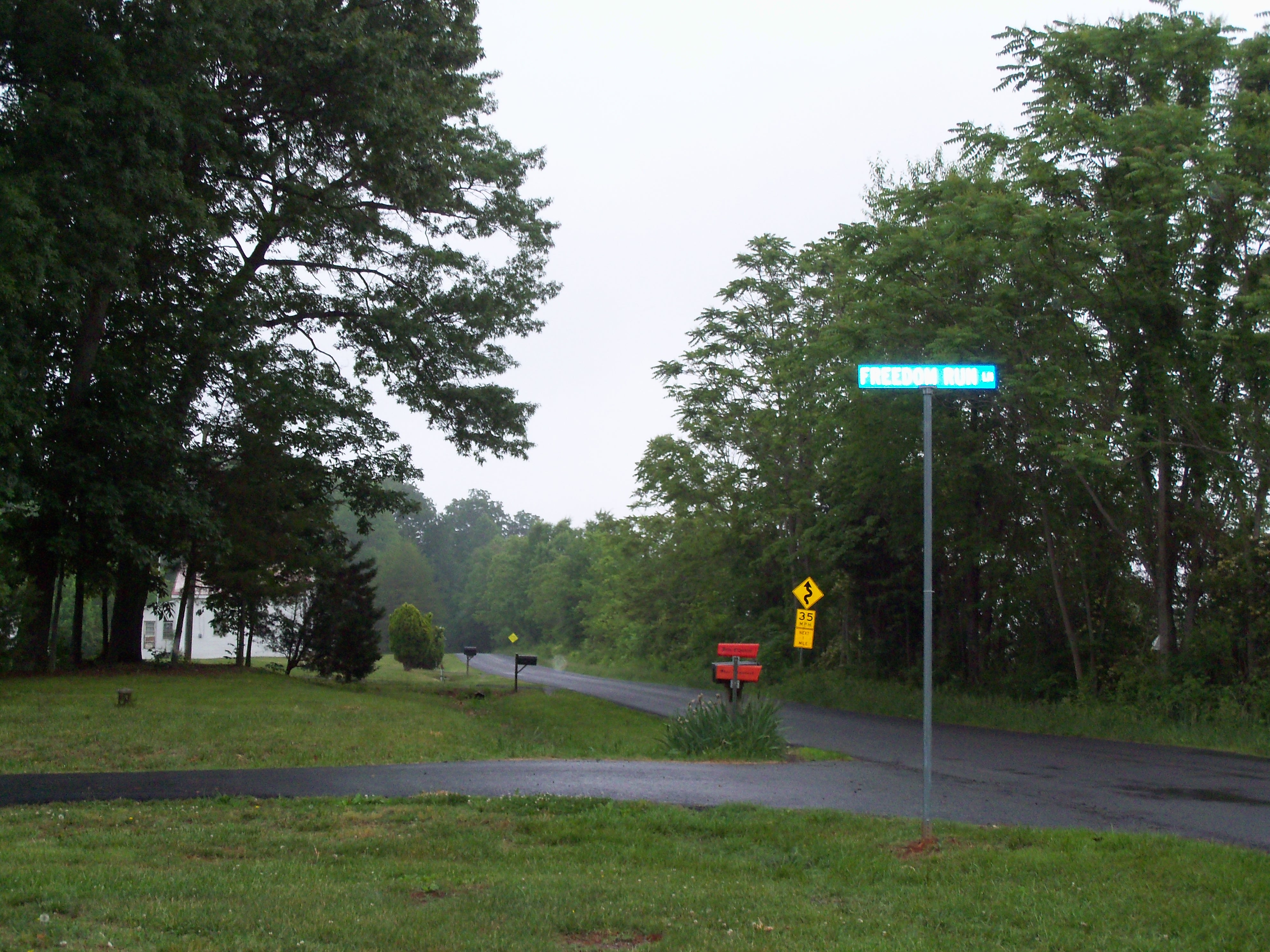
- A street in Alanthus

- Location within Virginia Location within the United States
- Coordinates: 38°32′27″N 78°07′54″W
- Country: United States
- State: Virginia
- County: Culpeper
- Time zone: UTC-5 (Eastern (EST))
  - Summer (DST): UTC-4 (EDT)
- Area code: 540

Alanthus is an unincorporated region in Culpeper County, Virginia, United States.
