= Eastern Shore (Alabama) =

Region of Alabama, United States

Coordinates: 30°32′32″N 87°54′30″W

Eastern Shore is the geographic eastern shoreline of Mobile Bay in southwest Alabama. It extends from just north of Interstate 10 to the southeastern end of the bay near Weeks Bay. Since there is no official boundary set for the "Eastern Shore" its usage is subject to change. However, broadly speaking, the area is bounded by U.S. Highway 31 to the north, U.S. Highway 98 to the south, State Route 181 to the east and Mobile Bay to the west.

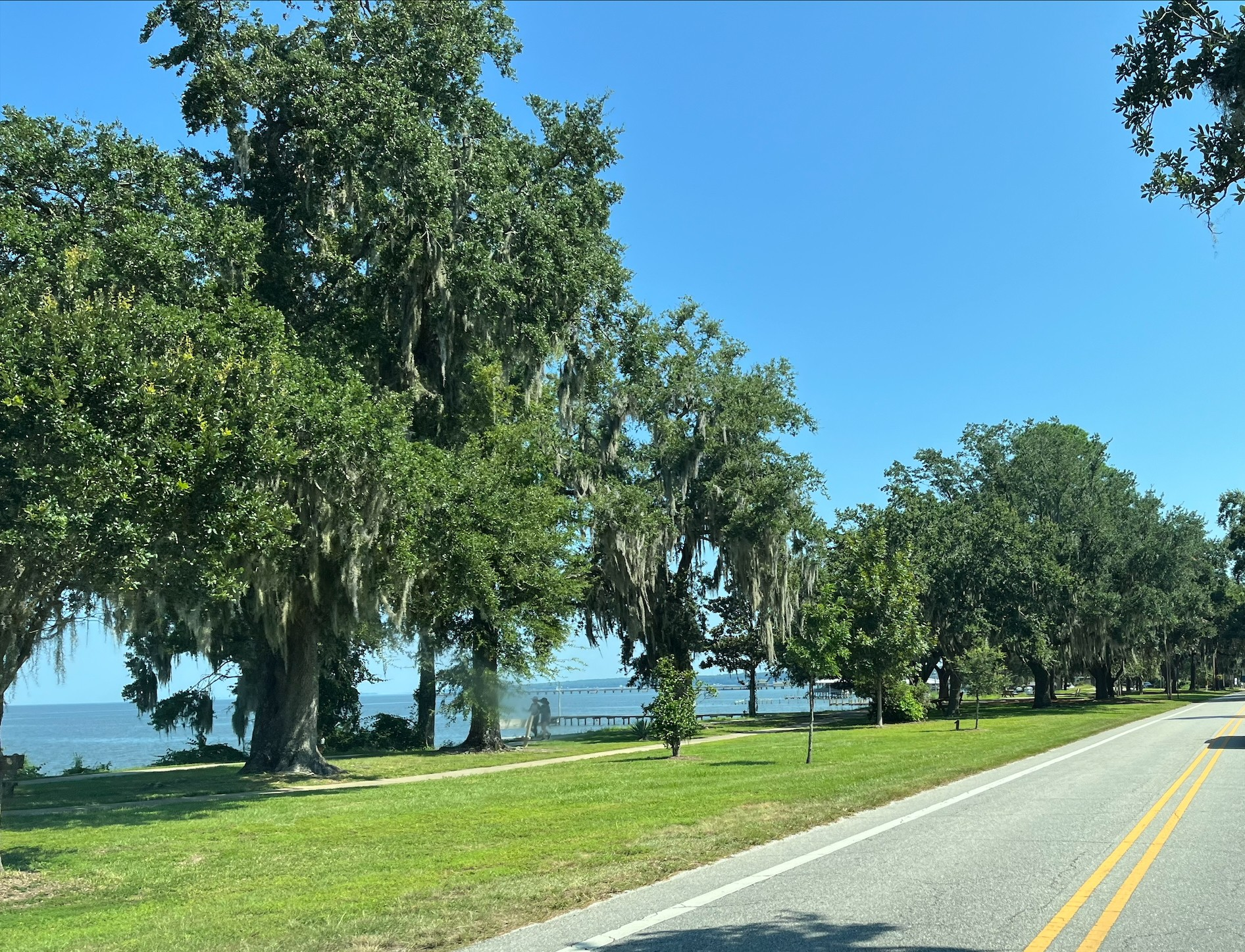
Eastern Shore of Mobile Bay from U.S. Highway 98 Alternate in Fairhope.

== Cities ==
The Eastern Shore is composed of three municipalities, Spanish Fort, Daphne and Fairhope. All three of those municipalities are located inside Baldwin County. Three smaller communities, Montrose, Barnwell, and Point Clear are also often included in the region.

== Education ==
Students in the Eastern Shore is served by Baldwin County Board of Education. High schools in the districts include Spanish Fort High School, Daphne High School, and Fairhope High School.

== Commerce ==
While tourism is significant in the region, especially further south in the Gulf Shores area, the principal business along the Eastern Shore is retail. Large and expanding retail shopping centers mark both Daphne and Spanish Fort, while Fairhope is home to numerous smaller specialty shops in its downtown business district.

Tourism is predominant in Point Clear because of a large classical-style hotel and the presence of a championship golf course.
