= List of killings by law enforcement officers in the United States, March 2018 =

Reported fatalities by US Law Enforcement Officers in March 2018

This is a list of people reported killed by non-military law enforcement officers in the United States in March 2018, whether in the line of duty or not, and regardless of reason or method. The listing documents the occurrence of a death, making no implications regarding wrongdoing or justification on the part of the person killed or officer involved. Killings are arranged by date of the incident that caused death. Different death dates, if known, are noted in the description. The table below lists 83 people.

== March 2018 ==
Date	Name (age) of deceased	State (city)	Description
2018-03-31	Nicolas Sedano (21)	Nevada (Reno)	Police responded to a call of a burglary at a mini-storage lot and found Sedano sitting in a stolen car. It was unknown why an officer shot him.
2018-03-31	Jason Birt (27)	Oklahoma (Guthrie)	An officer on an unrelated call saw Birt beating a woman and wielding a machete. When he refused their command to stop, they shot him.
2018-03-30	Timothy Breckenridge (42)	California (Atwater)	Officers were serving a warrant on Breckenridge; a fight ensued and police shot him.
2018-03-30	Edward Van McCrae (60)	North Carolina (Winston-Salem)	Police made a traffic stop and McCrae was a passenger in the car. An officer thought he was moving suspiciously and ordered him out. The officer and McCrae struggled, and when the officer saw that McCrae possessed a handgun, he shot him.
2018-03-29	Rodney Toler (39)	West Virginia (Charleston)	Police tried to pull Toler over for a traffic violation, but he drove off instead. After a chase Toler crashed his car; he got out and shot at officers, who returned fire.
2018-03-29	James Decoursey (35)	Tennessee (Clarksville)	Police were on the lookout for Decoursey, who was suspected of stealing a truck. Based on several tips, they found him and pursued him on foot; it's not known what prompted them to shoot him.
2018-03-29	Christopher Gatewood (39)	Nevada (Las Vegas)	Police responding to a domestic disturbance call found a woman beaten and Gatewood armed with a knife. When Gatewood charged at them, they shot him.
2018-03-28	William John Dominguez (31)	Oklahoma (Stillwater)	Police responded to a call from a man saying he was suicidal and would jump in front of traffic. Officers found Dominguez armed with a gun and a knife, and shot him when he brandished the weapons at them.
2018-03-28	Aaron Ibrahem (26)	Pennsylvania (Lower Macungie Township)	State police chased a shoplifter through a Walmart store. In the parking lot, the suspect turned and shot at them; they shot him as he got into a van in the parking lot.
2018-03-28	Jesse Kilgus (51)	Kentucky (Elizabethtown)	Kilgus's wife was found dead; deputies alerted the local high school that Kilgus might be on his way there to pick up his child. Kilgus did arrive, but because the school was on lockdown, he was denied entry by a resource officer. Deputies arrived and found Kilgus in his car; after several minutes of conversation, Kilgus came out of the car with a handgun and deputies shot him.
2018-03-28	Gerald Richard Johns (64)	Alabama (Sylacauga)	Johns was pulled over in a traffic stop, but then drove away with a state trooper hanging on to his car. The trooper shot him as he was dragged.
2018-03-28	Robert B. Shaw (29)	South Carolina (Swansea)	Police saw Shaw driving and pursued him because of several outstanding warrants. The chase ended on a local freeway when police used a tire-spike device. When they saw Shaw holding a gun to his own head, police backed off and began talking with him. After several hours, they decided to approach Shaw's truck again, and when Shaw made a sudden move they shot him.
2018-03-28	George Pappas (61)	Arizona (Surprise)	Police were called for a 'welfare check' at a local office, and arrived to find Pappas armed with a knife.
2018-03-27	Juan Carlos Romero (41), aka Rafael Yepez	North Carolina (Sanford)	Police responded to a domestic disturbance call to find Romero armed with a handgun. They say Romero then fired at the three responding officers, and they returned fire. Family members say Romero was unarmed with his hands up when he was shot.
2018-03-27	Isaac Michael Scroggie (24)	Florida (Midway)	Investigating a report of a break-in, a deputy arrived to find Scroggie coming out of the home in question. (By one report, Scroggie had been struggling with a woman in the yard.) Scroggie began to flee but then confronted the deputy, who first used a Taser and then shot Scroggie.
2018-03-27	Evan Bashir (29)	Idaho (Nampa)	911 calls reported a domestic disturbance and stabbing. When officers arrived on the scene, they found one woman dead, two others seriously injured, several children present, and a suspect inside the house with a weapon. The officers entered the home and shot Bashir.
2018-03-27	Marco Antonio Saavedra (44)	Texas (Pasadena)	An officer was pulling Saavedra over in a traffic stop. Saavedra got out of his car with a hand hidden behind him, then turned and pointed a gun at the officer, who shot him. Saavedra staggered in the street, then pointed the gun at the officer again and was shot again. (Family later reported that Saavedra once said he hoped to commit "suicide by cop".)
2018-03-27	Holly Knighton	Alabama (Montgomery)	Two police officers approached a stolen vehicle when Knighton began to drive it away, dragging one of the officers under the car. The second officer fired into the car, killing Knighton.
2018-03-27	Jose Aaron Gonzalez (44)	Arizona (Phoenix)	Officers were serving a search warrant at a home when they saw Gonzalez flee into a back room. A robot was sent in, and police observed Gonzalez with a handgun. When SWAT officers came into the home, Gonzalez confronted them with the gun and they shot him.
2018-03-26	Nathan C. Castle (34)	Virginia (Big Stone Gap)	A Wise County deputy attempted to make a traffic stop on Castle, but Castle drove away. After a chase, Castle stopped and got out armed with a shotgun. The deputy shot him.
2018-03-25	J'Allen Jones (31)	Connecticut (Newtown)	Officers at Garner Correctional Institution were involved in a physical struggle with Jones during an attempted strip search, restraining and pepper-spraying him. Jones died, and his death was ruled a homicide.
2018-03-25	Unidentified man	Texas (Austin)	Police officers responding to an emergency call arrived at a duplex. Finding nothing apparently wrong, they were about to leave when someone fired a shot from inside one of the homes, injuring an officer. SWAT officers were called, who used a robot to break down the door. A man and a woman came out, and police shot the man.
2018-03-24	Nikolai Yakunin (42)	Alaska (Nikolaevsk)	Alaska state troopers were investigating a report that Yakunin was in violation of his probation. Yakunin attacked a trooper, "incapacitating" him according to the official report. Other responding officers shot Yakunin as he assaulted them.
2018-03-24	Zander M. Clark (20)	Alaska (Anchorage)	Clark slashed tires and stabbed a woman in a parking lot, then was chased by a police officer on foot. When Clark turned and ran at the officer, he shot Clark.
2018-03-24	Kaitlin Demeo (25)	Ohio (Columbus)	Police responded to a report of shots fired to find Demeo barricaded inside a home with a rifle. When she fired at them, they returned fire, killing her.
2018-03-23	Unidentified man	Arizona (Scottsdale)	Salt River police responded to a call about a man in a parking lot making threats and waving a weapon. As the man advanced on them, officers shot him. He died in a hospital two weeks later, still not publicly identified.
2018-03-23	Kevin Hall (40)	Michigan (Genesee Township)	After a bank robbery, police stopped Hall driving a van described as the getaway vehicle. Police detained two others who were in the van, but Hall attempted to drive away; police blocked him in with a patrol car, and a standoff ensued. When Hall got out of the van and charged at officers with a rifle, several of them opened fire.
2018-03-23	Robert Vega	Arizona (Douglas)	Douglas police, responding to a domestic disturbance call, found Vega's wife doused in gasoline and Vega holding "an incendiary device". Police shot him.
2018-03-23	Linus F. Phillip (30)	Florida (Largo)	A police officer instigated a traffic stop on Phillip; they pulled into at a gas station, Phillip got out of his car, and the officer smelled marijuana. Phillip got back into the car and drove it backward, dragging the officer and crashing against the gas pumps. The officer then shot him.
2018-03-23	Kevin Robles (23)	Arizona (Phoenix)	Responding to a report of a vehicle break-in, police found Robles holding a knife and acting "agitated". After Robles was Tased several times, he attacked officers and they shot him.
2018-03-23	Unidentified man	Texas (Childress)	Just after midnight on the morning of the 23rd, a sheriff's deputy tried to stop a car for a traffic violation. The suspect did not stop and led police and deputies on a long chase. After running from his car, the suspect pointed a gun at officers and they shot him.
2018-03-23	Daniel Allen Young (32)	Louisiana (Bogalusa)	A sheriff's deputy responded to a call of a suspicious person at a boat launch in the early morning hours. The deputy and Young struggled; Bogalusa police officers arrived, saw the fight, then shot and killed Young.
2018-03-23	Michael Leroy McGinnis II (29)	Texas (Abilene)	Police were serving McGinnis with warrants for indecency with a child and a warrant to revoke his probation for arson. When McGinnis raised a gun, one of the officers shot him.
2018-03-22	Danny Ray Thomas (35)	Texas (Greenspoint)	A sheriff's deputy saw a man acting erratically in an intersection--his pants around his ankles, "talking to himself and hitting vehicles as they passed by," and fighting with a driver. The deputy stopped, and Thomas approached him. The deputy shot Thomas.
2018-03-22	Santiago Calderon (36)	Illinois (Aurora)	Police had been watching a "known gang house" when Calderon, who was free on bond on gun charges, left the house and drove off. Police followed and tried to stop the car; Calderon shot at officers, then drove away. Calderon crashed into another car, got out and exchanged fire with police, who killed him.
2018-03-21	Jehad Eid (21)	California (San Francisco)	Police responded to reports of a man with a gun on Amazon Avenue. On arriving, they found Eid inside the Amazon Barber Shop. They exchanged shots; Eid was killed, and several officers and civilians were wounded.
2018-03-21	Angel Uolla (18)	Texas (Littlefield)	Uolla stabbed his teacher and two other people at a local community center. When police found him two blocks away, Uolla brandished a knife, and police killed him.
2018-03-21	Jason M. Raffaeli (25)	Florida (Amelia Island)	Raffaeli called 911, reporting there were gunman in his condo. When sheriff's deputies arrived, they heard gunshots inside, then Raffaeli confronted them with a gun. According to deputies, he said, "Tell my daddy I love him and make sure you shoot me in the head," before firing at them.
2018-03-21	Mark Allen Lunn (47)	Oklahoma (Mannford)	A woman called police to report her concern about Lunn, who had come to her home to discuss purchasing a car. When police arrived, Lunn walked away, but then pulled out a "large knife" and "made a move toward one of the officers."
2018-03-21	Duane Preciado (39)	Oklahoma (Owasso)	Police were called for a welfare check. On arriving, Preciado (whom his family describes as a 16-year military veteran with PTSD) came out of the home with an AK-47 and a semi-automatic pistol. He began walking toward officers, making threatening comments; when he did not follow commands to stop, police shot him.
2018-03-20	Scott Mielentz (56)	New Jersey (Princeton)	Mielentz entered a Panera Bread restaurant with a gun. Employees and customers were able to flee the building. After a standoff between Mielentz and police of several hours, police shot and killed him.
2018-03-20	Chance Christophe Haegele (20)	Florida (Winter Haven)	Police received multiple reports that Haegele had posted on social media that was going to kill himself and his mother (or had already killed his mother). As deputies arrived, Haegele himself called 911 and said he was armed and wanted the cops to kill him. When he aimed at officers, they shot him. (Haegele's mother was unharmed. Haegele had been "Baker Act'ed" multiple times, meaning authorities had detained him for involuntary mental-health exams.)
2018-03-20	Kent Earl Pitman (56)	North Carolina (Timberlake)	Possible "suicide by cop": Sheriff's deputies went to Pittman's home to serve an eviction notice. Pittman was on a porch holding a gun to his own head. After more than an hour of talking, Pittman pointed the gun at deputies and they shot him.
2018-03-20	Joel Pflum (32)	Kentucky (Georgetown)	Pflum broke into his ex-wife's home. She managed to call 911, and when officers arrive Pflum was on the porch. Pflum pointed a gun at them, and one officer fired one shot.
2018-03-19	Steven Nguyen (27)	Colorado (Denver)	While searching for a man who escaped them earlier in the day, Denver police pursued a suspect car from Aurora into Denver; they shot both men who were in it, one of whom died. (Neither man was the escapee).
2018-03-19	Michael Lavelle Holliman (50)	Arkansas (Lone Rock)	Holliman was driving a stolen tractor and was stopped by a deputy. When Holliman brandished a crossbow, the deputy shot him.
2018-03-19	Rueben T. Ruffin Jr. (24)	Kentucky (Utica)	Kentucky state police responded to a report of a person driving donuts in a field. They gave chase but the suspect crashed and got out and started running. The suspect pulled out a gun, and the trooper then shot the man.
2018-03-19	Jermaine Massey (35)	Greenville, South Carolina	Sheriff's deputies responding to a domestic disturbance call found Massey with a butcher knife. After several minutes, deputies say he charged at them and at least one deputy fired a shot, killing Massey.
2018-03-18	Manuel Borrego (40)	California (South El Monte)	Deputies responded to a call about a burglary in progress at a boarded-up commercial property. When they arrived, they saw a man standing on the sidewalk across from the building with a backpack. That man then approached the deputies carrying two knives, and they shot him.
2018-03-18	Stephon Clark (22)	California (Sacramento)	Police were pursuing a window-smashing suspect on foot. A police helicopter directed them to Clark's backyard, where the police called out several orders to him. At least one officer yelled "Gun!" and several fired, thinking Clark had a gun in his hand. Police later announced that Clark was only carrying a cell phone.
2018-03-18	Unidentified man (40)	Texas (Lancaster)	Police were conducting a traffic stop when the driver backed his car toward two officers. The officers dodged; the driver then drove back forward toward one of the officers. That officer was struck, was dragged, and fired at the car, striking the driver.
2018-03-17	Osbaldo Jimenez Ramirez (50)	California (Valley Center)	Ramirez fled Escondido police who were responding to a disturbance call. After a high-speed chase, Ramirez stopped near the entrance to the Valley View Casino. Police believed he was armed, and a "confrontation ensued" near the casino doors that ended with an officer shooting Ramirez.
2018-03-16	Bobby Lovin (62)	North Carolina (Burnsville)	Yancey County deputies responded to a call from a woman about her husband, who was under a restraining order, breaking into her home. His son was also in the home and tried to reason with Lovin before police arrived. When Lovin approached the woman with an ax, a deputy shot him.
2018-03-16	James Alfonso Vaughn (49)	Tennessee (Clarksville)	Vaughn was the ex-boyfriend of a woman who had recently gone missing. When police learned he might be staying with a friend, they went to the friend's apartment but were not admitted. SWAT officers broke in and used tear gas, but left again as Vaughn shot at them. Later they broke in a second time and exchanged fire with Vaughn, killing him.
2018-03-16	Mark Clinton Harrell (26)	Tennessee (Jonesborough)	Police responded to a complaint of drug activity and found Harrell in a motel parking lot with a knife. After a foot chase and confrontation, one of the officers shot Harrell.
2018-03-16	William Langfitt (28)	Washington (Elk Plain)	Deputies responded to 911 calls that Langfitt had a knife and appeared to be having a mental breakdown in the middle of a road, trying to get into cars. When he tried to enter a deputy's car, the deputy shot him.
2018-03-15	Cameron Hall (27)	Arizona (Casa Grande)	Police officers responded to a domestic disturbance call, where Hall assaulted one of them. The officer used a Taser on Hall but that didn't stop him; the officer then shot Hall.
2018-03-14	Ryan Chapman (26)	Oregon (Keizer)	Responding to an armed robbery, police pursued a suspect vehicle driven by Chapman. After that car crashed, Chapman ran, then confronted police and was shot.
2018-03-14	Shermichael Ezeff (31)	Louisiana (East Baton Rouge)	A sheriff's deputy was serving an unrelated restraining order in an apartment complex when Ezeff approached him. Ezeff was bleeding from a cut on his arm, and multiple witnesses report he was acting strangely ("psychotic" or "altered state of mind"). When Ezeff struggled with the deputy, the deputy shot him.
2018-03-14	Unidentified person	South Dakota (Parmelee)	A Rosebud Sioux Tribe police officer was confronted by a person with a weapon who failed to respond to the officer's commands. The officer then shot and killed him.
2018-03-13	Bryan Liles (31)	Utah (Sandy)	Agents with the Bureau of Alcohol, Tobacco, Firearms and Explosives were working to serve a federal arrest warrant on Liles found him in a car with other people. Officials reported they shot Liles but not how it happened or why.
2018-03-12	Jaden Marsh (16)	Michigan (Midland)	Police checking out a report of two men breaking car windows found and chased two men, one of whom was Marsh. One of the men turned and shot at the officers; when they returned fire they hit Marsh.
2018-03-12	Kenneth Scott Townley (47)	Michigan (Blackman Township)	After using a gun to rob a woman, Townley was confronted by police. Witnesses said he raised a gun and failed to heed commands to drop it.
2018-03-12	Brisco Tim Woodell (61)	North Carolina (Lexington)	When deputies responded to a domestic disturbance call, Woodell locked himself in a shed and threatened them. When he eventually came out, Woodell fired a shot at Davidson County deputies, and they returned fire.
2018-03-12	Justin Lee Dietrich (32)	North Dakota (West Fargo)	A police officer spotted Dietrich driving, recognized there was a warrant for him with a warning that he would be armed. Dietrich would not pull over and at one point in the chase he rammed into a squad car. When Dietrich did stop, he sat in his car for a long while as police tried to negotiate. SWAT officers were brought in. When Dietrich got out of the car, officers shot him.
2018-03-12	Michael Ward (46)	New York (Manhasset)	Ward got out of his car with a baseball bat and broke the windshields of drivers who had honked at him. A passing police officer stopped and tried to restrain Ward, who also hit people with his bat; when he turned and approached the officer, Ward was shot.
2018-03-12	Jontell Reedom (27)	California (Tulare)	A local man was attacked by Reedom. Police who responded used a Taser on Reedom; he alternated fighting with them with running away. In one of the stop-and-fight moments, police shot him.
2018-03-12	Decynthia Clements (34)	Illinois (Elgin)	Police tried to stop Clements's car; after a chase, she stopped on a freeway and they approached her, finding she was armed with a knife. After trying for an hour to talk Clements out of the car, police saw that a fire had started inside the vehicle; police say that as they tried to pull her out of the burning vehicle, she brandished the knife and was shot multiple times.
2018-03-11	Juan Garcia Alvarez (57)	Texas (Midland)	Alvarez's wife was found stabbed to death. An hour or two later deputies found Alvarez behind the home; he fired a gun at the officers who them shot him.
2018-03-11	Joshua Pawlik (32)	California (Oakland)	A 31-year old homeless man with a history of mental health issues was fatally shot by four officers, who "fired their rifles at Pawlik, who was lying on the ground between two houses and stirring awake" as the officers yelling conflicting commands (with some shouting him not to move and others shouting at him to raise his hands). A fifth officer shot a beanbag round. Pawlik's hand was on a handgun resting on the ground. The Oakland Police Department's internal review found that police did not violate rules on use-of-force, but in 2019, the court-appointed monitor overseeing the police department and the City Police Commission determined, based on police body-camera footage, that Pawlik did not present an immediate threat to the officers, and recommended that the five officers be fired.
2018-03-11	Andy Lucero (48)	New Mexico (Fort Sumner)	Lucero entered his ex-girlfriend's home (in violation of a restraining order); he struggled with her, shot another person, and fled. Later in the day, police found his car about 20 miles away and then were able to track down Lucero.
2018-03-10	Orion Godbout (45)	California (Fontana)	Police responded to reports of shots fired found a victim. While searching the neighborhood, they found Godbout with a gun and had "an exchange of gunfire".
2018-03-10	Daniel Stacey Reynolds (20)	Oregon (Hillsboro)	Police responding to a domestic disturbance call found Reynolds exiting the home with a shotgun; they exchanged fire, killing Reynolds. The family's minister says that Reynolds may have had "the goal to end his life."
2018-03-09	David Gardea (27)	Arizona (Phoenix)	Police responding to a domestic disturbance call found Gardea in a driveway with a gun. Gardea ran, and during the foot chase he fired at officers who then killed him.
2018-03-09	Alkeeta Allena Walker (32)	Florida (Tarpon Springs)	Police found Walker in a street wielding a knife. She charged them, and they used a Taser on her, but she did not stop; one of the deputies fell down as Walker approached and that officer shot her.
2018-03-08	Unidentified man	Pennsylvania (Pottstown)	Police were called to a home to check on a person reported to be suicidal. They found a man in the parking lot who appeared to be armed, and shot him; it was later found that he had a BB pistol.
2018-03-08	Unidentified man	California (Jurupa Valley)	Riverside police officers searched for a wanted parolee who had reportedly shot at his ex-girlfriend. They found the suspect and shot him while trying to arrest him.
2018-03-08	Jamil Harvey (16)	Virginia (Spotsylvania)	Harvey was the suspect in the theft of two cars. When police found the second car, they were able then to find Harvey. Harvey was armed and initially followed officer commands, but when he again raised his gun they shot him.
2018-03-08	Dwight Heckman (27)	Alaska (Pilot Station)	On 7 March, Heckman beat, strangled, and shot at a woman in the western Alaska town of St. Mary's, then fled on a snowmobile. Weather prevented state troopers from reaching Heckman's home in Pilot Station (about 15 miles away) until the next day; there, Heckman pointed a gun at an officer and then ran into nearby woods. Later that day he was spotted and a gun battle took place.
2018-03-07	Victor Ancira (46)	Texas (Austin)	Austin police received a call from someone claiming to have killed his father and brother. At the home, police found no evidence of the killings and instead found Ancira armed with a pickax. Trying to get him to drop the ax, officers first shot him with "less lethal munition" and a Taser; but he continued to run toward them and they shot him. Officers found a suicide note on the door of the home; family reports that Ancira was diagnosed with bipolar schizophrenia.
2018-03-07	Donald McFarlane (53)	California (Long Beach)	McFarlane's wife reported he was armed and threatening to blow up the federal building. Police found McFarlane in a van in the area of city hall and the federal building. They talked to him for a couple of hours, and fired rubber bullets in an attempt to get him to give up his firearm; when he pointed the gun at them, they shot him, and later found that it was a toy gun. No explosives were found.
2018-03-06	Steven Peters (55)	Colorado (Pueblo)	Peters was reported to be armed and in a home in violation of a restraining order. When police arrived, Peters left on a bicycle and officers pursued on foot. During the chase, Peters pointed a gun at police.
2018-03-06	Michael Reynolds (36)	Indiana (Terre Haute)	Responding to a call about shots fired, police found two victims (a man and woman, the woman died). Using information provided by the male victim, police located a suspect car; as they approached the house where it was parked, gunfire came from inside. Police returned fire and, over the next few hours, tried shooting tear gas and sending a robot into the house. The next morning police were tipped that the suspect had moved to another house; there, Reynolds emerged armed and wearing body armor. When he gestured at police, they shot him.
2018-03-06	Michael Kline (40)	Indiana (North Manchester)	Police made a traffic stop on Kline. It is unknown why they shot him, but a gun was recovered at the scene.
2018-03-06	Louis Troy Risinger (70)	Texas (Shelbyville)	Family called the police when Risinger became violent. When police arrived, Risinger came out of the house with a firearm and was killed when he did not obey commands to put it down.
2018-03-06	Jesus Delgado-Duarte (19)	California (San Francisco)	Officers were flagged down in the evening by two victims of a reported armed robbery, who gave a description of a suspect car. When the officers found the car, they detained two suspects who were seated in the car but then noticed another in the trunk. That suspect, Delgado-Duarte, pushed the trunk open and fired at officers, who shot back.
2018-03-06	James E. Waters (37)	Missouri (Clinton)	Police received a 911 call that brought them to a home where they found Waters barricaded inside. Waters shot three officers, killing one, and police shot back killing him.
2018-03-05	Andrew Rossi (25)	New Mexico (Farmington)	Rossi was wanted by police in Colorado, and local deputies identified his car at a Farmington motel. SWAT was called and tried to make contact and negotiate with Rossi. After several hours SWAT officers entered Rossi's motel room and realized a man was hiding in the ceiling. As they removed ceiling tiles, Rossi fell out; when he brandished a knife, an officer shot him.
2018-03-05	Unidentified man	Missouri (Kansas City)	A neighbor's 911 call brought police to a home, where a suspect came outside and shot at them. Officers returned fire, killing the man; they found one woman shot dead in the yard, another in the house, and the house on fire.
2018-03-05	Steven Dalton (35)	Kentucky (Oil Springs)	Deputies responded to a call to find Dalton in his yard, shouting and combative. They tased him, but Dalton ran into his home. Deputies heard gunshots, and when Dalton pointed a gun out the door they started firing back.
2018-03-05	Ryan L. Smith (44)	Florida (Lakeland)	Deputies saw a vehicle driving erratically in the middle of the road before it turned down another road and then drove through a yard. Smith got out of the car and ran, carrying a knife and saying "shoot me, shoot me". Deputies eventually surrounded him, and when he wielded the knife at them they fired.
2018-03-05	Robert Lewis Yates (65)	Alabama (Barnwell)	Two deputies attempting to serve a writ were shot at. They returned fire and retreated. SWAT officers came and police cleared nearby homes while deploying tear gas into Yates' trailer. SWAT then entered the home, Yates fired at them, and they shot back killing him.
2018-03-05	David Willoughby (33)	Georgia (Carroll County)	Willoughby was reported to be walking through the neighborhood with a rifle. Deputies arrived and told him to put it down; when he pointed it at them, they shot him. They then found that it was a pellet gun.
2018-03-05	Brandon Kuhlman (28)	Idaho (Sandpoint)	Officers responded to a 911 call, and Kuhlman met them at the door shooting. Both officers were injured; they returned fire, killing Kuhlman. Family reports that Kuhlman had been acting erratically and they called 911 when he obtained a gun.
2018-03-04	Angel Luis Ortiz	Pennsylvania (Abington Township)	During a domestic violence call, Ortiz refused officer commands and ran into a basement. There, officers found him standing over an injured woman, pointing what appeared to be a gun at them. They shot and killed him, then determined he had been armed with a bloody awl and a toy gun.
2018-03-03	Michael McEntee (70)	Missouri (Johnson County)	Police responded to a report of shots fired at a rural address. When they arrived, McEntee shot out the window of a cruiser. Police took cover, but McEntee continued shooting and officers returned fire.
2018-03-03	Marvin McMillian (41)	Mississippi (Gulfport)	When officers tried to arrest McMillian for a shooting that took place in January, McMillian barricaded himself inside a home. SWAT negotiated with him for several hours, but when McMillian started shooting at them they shot back.
2018-03-03	Amanda Alvarez (38)	Arizona (Pima County)	Alvarez was reported to have assaulted someone else in a domestic dispute. When deputies responded, she attacked them with a two-by-four and with bear-repellent pepper spray.
2018-03-02	Unidentified man (31)	California (Santa Ana)	Garden Grove police officers were following a man who was wanted for a probation violation. When they contacted him in a car in the parking lot of a convenience store in Santa Ana, for an unknown reason they shot him.
2018-03-02	Stephen Hudak (44)	Arizona (Glendale)	A multi-agency force of police attempted to arrest Hudak on multiple felony charges. Hudak ran from them, into a nearby neighborhood; when police cornered him in a side yard, Hudak shot at them and they returned fire.
2018-03-02	Jose D. Gomez Burgos (29)	Pennsylvania (Bristol Township)	Police received a report of a car with New York plates that had been parked for an unusual length of time. Burgos got out of the car with a gun and was shot.
2018-03-02	Unidentified man	Texas (Clarksville)	A sheriff's deputy saw a man sitting in a pickup truck, blocking the sally port of the county jail. When the deputy approached the car, the man got out brandishing a weapon; when the man reached back into the car and came out with a weapon in each hand, the deputy shot him.
2018-03-02	Erik Dunham (48)	Arizona (Scottsdale)	Agents with U.S. Immigration and Customs Enforcement's Homeland Security Investigations tracked and found Dunham in a burger restaurant's parking lot. As they approached, Dunham drew a gun and an agent shot him.
2018-03-02	Christopher Race (36)	Arizona (Mesa)	Mesa police received a tip on the location of Race, a suspect in an earlier stabbing. As they approached Race, he brandished a knife; they shot him with beanbags, but when he continued to approach they shot him.
2018-03-01	Timothy M. Gray (40)	Virginia (Henrico)	Officers of the Capital Area Regional Fugitive Task Force tried to stop Gray, who was driving on a freeway. After a car chase that ended with Gray crashing, Gray got out of his car armed with a machete and an officer shot him.
2018-03-01	Joel Jacobo (29)	Arizona (Tucson)	Three probation officers were serving a warrant on Jacobo. One of them shot him because he believed Jacobo had a gun.

== See also ==
- Death in custody § United States
- Henry A. Wallace Police Crime Public Database
- List of cases of police brutality
- List of countries with annual rates and counts for killings by law enforcement officers
- List of law enforcement officers killed in the line of duty in the United States
- List of law enforcement officers convicted for an on-duty killing in the United States
- List of shootings by US immigration agents
- List of police reforms related to the George Floyd protests
- List of unarmed African Americans killed by law enforcement officers in the United States
- Lists of killings by law enforcement officers
- Police brutality in the United States
- Police misconduct § United States
- Police riot § United States
- Police use of deadly force in the United States
