= Ryan Anderson (linebacker) =

American football player (born 1994)

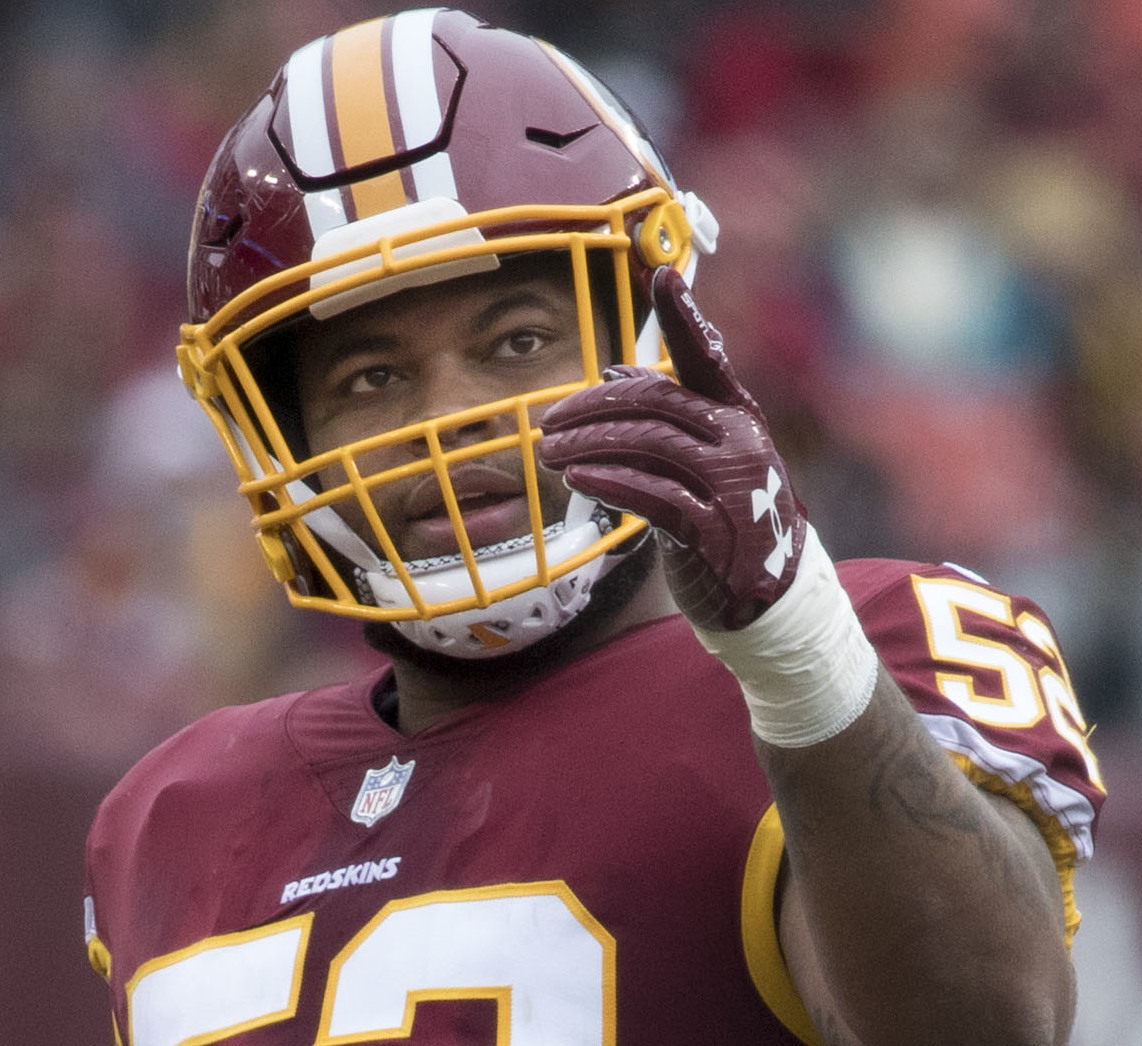
- Anderson with the Washington Redskins in 2017

No. 52
- Position: Linebacker

Personal information
- Born: August 12, 1994 (age 32); Daphne, Alabama, U.S.
- Listed height: 6 ft 2 in (1.88 m)
- Listed weight: 255 lb (116 kg)

Career information
- High school: Daphne
- College: Alabama (2012–2016)
- NFL draft: 2017: 2nd round, 49th overall pick

Career history
- Washington Redskins / Football Team (2017–2020); New York Giants (2021)*; Pittsburgh Steelers (2022)
- * Offseason or practice squad member only

Awards and highlights
- First-team All-SEC (2016)

Career NFL statistics
- Total tackles: 87
- Sacks: 6
- Forced fumbles: 5
- Fumble recoveries: 2
- Pass deflections: 1
- Stats at Pro Football Reference

Ryan Anderson (born August 12, 1994) is an American former professional football player who was a linebacker in the National Football League (NFL). He played college football for the Alabama Crimson Tide and was selected by the Washington Redskins in the second round of the 2017 NFL draft.

== Early life ==
Anderson attended Daphne High School in Daphne, Alabama. He had 75 tackles and 14.5 sacks for the football team during his junior year. As a senior, he had 105 tackles and 12 sacks as a senior. A 4-star recruit, Anderson committed to Alabama to play college football over offers from Illinois, Kentucky, Memphis, South Alabama, South Florida, Tennessee, UAB, and Western Kentucky.

== College career ==
After redshirting his first year at Alabama in 2012, Anderson played in all 13 games in 2013 and had 1.5 sacks. As a sophomore in 2014, he played in all 14 games, recording 25 tackles and three sacks. As a junior in 2015, he had 37 tackles and six sacks. He returned to Alabama for his senior year in 2016. As a senior, Anderson recorded 61 tackles, 8.5 sacks, one interception, three forced fumbles, four fumble recoveries, three pass deflections and a defensive touchdown.

== Professional career ==
=== Pre-draft ===
Pre-draft measurables
Height	Weight	Arm length	Hand span	40-yard dash	10-yard split	20-yard split	Three-cone drill	Vertical jump
6 ft 2 in (1.88 m)	253 lb (115 kg)	31 1/2 in (0.80 m)	9 3/8 in (0.24 m)	4.78 s	1.76 s	2.79 s	7.73 s	28 1/2 in (0.72 m)
All values from NFL Combine/Alabama's Pro Day

Anderson received an invitation to the Senior Bowl, but was unable to play in the game after he dislocated his thumb during the first day of practice. He attended the NFL Combine and decided to not perform the short shuttle, broad jump, bench press, and three-cone drill. Anderson also participated at Alabama's Pro Day, but opted to only perform the three-cone and positional drills. He was projected to be a second to fourth round pick by several analysts.

=== Washington Redskins / Football Team ===
The Washington Redskins selected Anderson in the second round (49th overall) of the 2017 NFL draft. On May 11, 2017, the Redskins signed Anderson to a four-year, $5.32 million contract with $2.71 million guaranteed and a signing bonus of $2.01 million. Along with being a backup outside linebacker behind starters Ryan Kerrigan and Preston Smith, Anderson took offensive snaps at fullback during his rookie season.

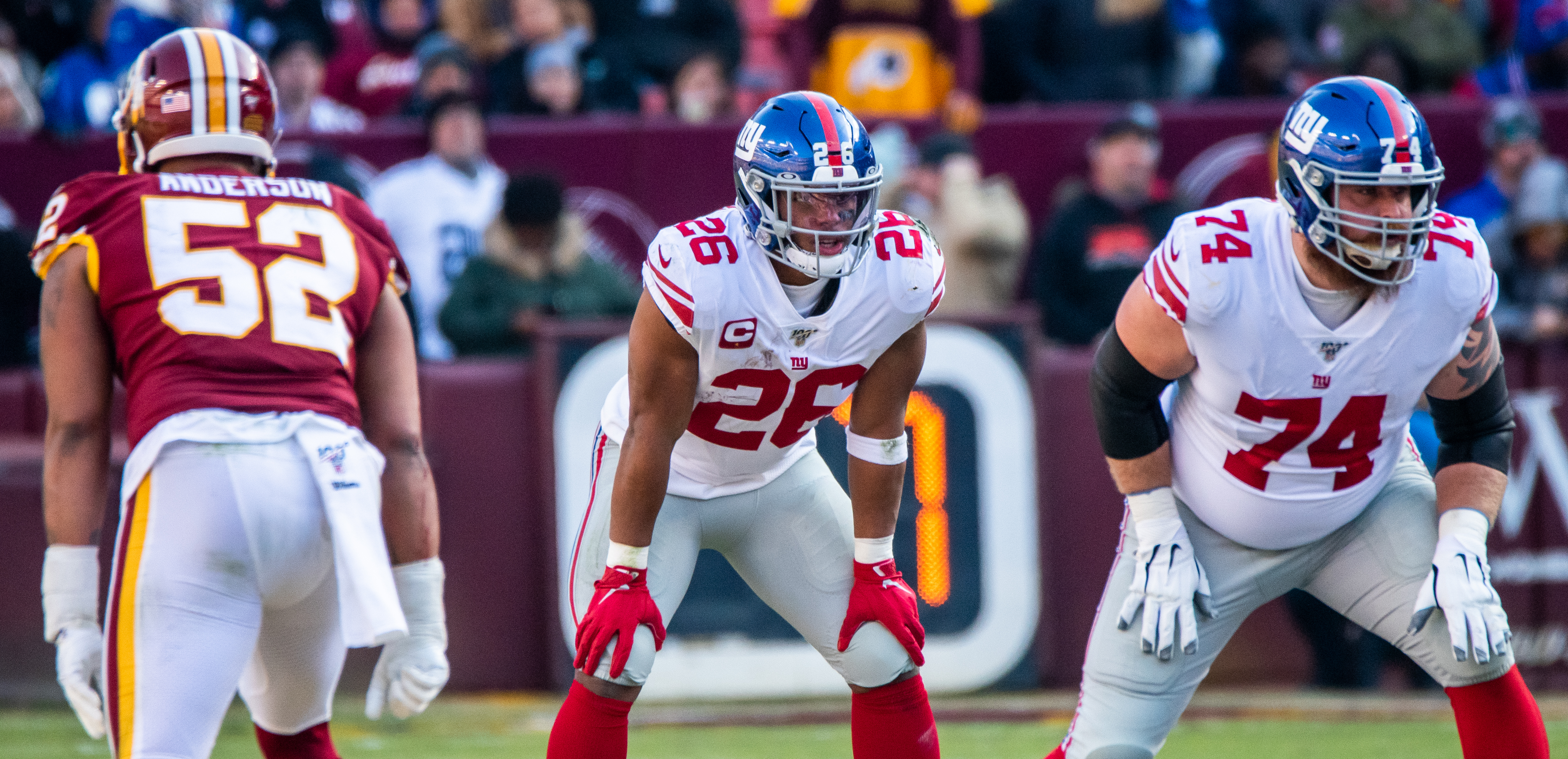
Anderson (left) in a game against the New York Giants in 2019

In Week 13 of the 2019 season, Anderson got his first career start against the Carolina Panthers as a replacement for Ryan Kerrigan, who suffered a concussion the previous game. Anderson was ejected in that game due to a helmet-to-helmet hit he inflicted on tight end Greg Olsen. The next game against the Green Bay Packers, he recorded a strip sack against quarterback Aaron Rodgers as well as recovered the fumble. Anderson would be named a starter before Week 15 after Kerrigan was placed on injured reserve. In his second start against the Philadelphia Eagles, Anderson had a dominating performance recording two sacks and three force fumbles. Anderson was placed on injured reserve on December 12, 2020, and left the team via free agency the following offseason.

=== New York Giants ===
Anderson signed a one-year, $1.13 million contract with the New York Giants on March 25, 2021. On August 28, Anderson was suspended for the first six games of the 2021 season due to violating the NFL's policy on performance enhancing substances. He was released by New York two days later.

=== Pittsburgh Steelers ===
On September 13, 2022, the Pittsburgh Steelers signed Anderson to their practice squad. He was promoted to the active roster on October 8. He was released on November 8.
