= Daphne, Alabama =

City in Alabama, United States

- City
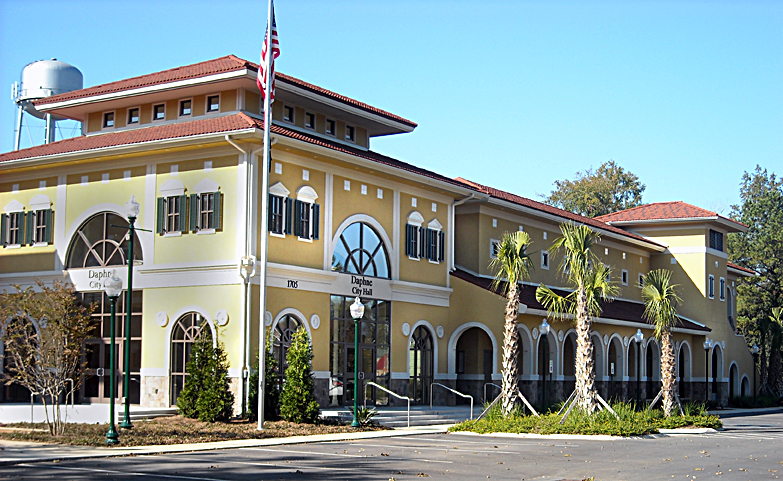
- Daphne City Hall

- Seal Logo

- Location of Daphne in Baldwin County, Alabama.
- Coordinates: 30°37′52″N 87°52′40″W
- Country: United States
- State: Alabama
- County: Baldwin
- Founded: 1763

Area
  - Total: 19.11 sq mi (49.49 km^{2})
  - Land: 18.99 sq mi (49.19 km^{2})
  - Water: 0.12 sq mi (0.31 km^{2})
- Elevation: 85 ft (26 m)

Population (2020)
  - Total: 27,462
  - Density: 1,446/sq mi (558.3/km^{2})
- Time zone: UTC-6 (Central (CST))
  - Summer (DST): UTC-5 (CDT)
- ZIP code: 36526
- Area code: 251
- FIPS code: 01-19648
- GNIS feature ID: 2404186
- Website: www.daphneal.com

Daphne (/ˈdæfniː/) is a city in Baldwin County, Alabama, United States, on the eastern shoreline of Mobile Bay. The city is located along I-10, 11 miles east of Mobile and 170 miles southwest of the state capital of Montgomery. The 2020 United States census lists its population as 27,462, making Daphne the most populous city in Baldwin County. It is a principal city of the Daphne-Fairhope-Foley metropolitan area, which includes all of Baldwin County.

The inhabited history of what is now called Daphne dates at least to the Paleo-Indian period and Native American tribes around 9000 BC. Modern-day Daphne is a thriving suburb of nearby Mobile. Daphne has adopted the nickname ″The Jubilee City″ in recognition of its status as one of the locations of the Mobile Bay jubilee.

== History ==
Daphne and the surrounding regions have been populated since from at least 9,000 BCE. European settlers eventually displaced the Native Americans. After a variety of wars and treaties, the area became part of the United States in 1814. Except for a period under the flag of the Confederate States of America, Daphne and its environs have remained part of the United States until this time. From Native American to the Spanish, French, and British, the city has seen a lengthy parade of historic influences, which give Daphne its present character.

=== Native American history ===
Early settlers to the region were hunter-gatherer tribes similar to those in North Alabama. A variety of Native American populations visited the area that would become Daphne including Tensaw, Choctaw, Creek, and Seminole. This area came to be known as neutral ground where tribes would meet and discuss the relationships between their nations. Small groups worked together to acquire food and provide for their families. Initially, these groups enjoyed an economy based on hunting and scavenging, but as time passed production of weapons and pottery became more advanced. During the late Woodland stage, Native Americans began to practice more elaborate ritual services. Although no burial grounds are known in Daphne, they are scattered throughout nearby Baldwin County.

By 1500, the zenith of Native American culture in South Alabama, it is estimated that a community of about 5,000 lived within 50 miles of the seacoast. These people were among the first who met Spanish explorer Hernando de Soto in 1540. From this meeting forward, the original settlers faced a disaster from which they did not recover.

=== European exploration and settlement ===
Daphne and the surrounding land shifted between English, French, Spanish, and United States control.

The Spanish were the first European settlers to the area of Daphne, arriving in 1557. Spanish control in the area was weak, and in 1710 French explorers claimed Mobile Bay, the eastern shore of the bay that includes Daphne as well as land east to Perdido Bay. The French claim was largely uncontested by the Spanish. In 1763, the British were ceded land, including the future Daphne, from the French in the Treaty of Paris (1763). The community of Daphne was established the same year and was known simply as the Village. The British occupied nearby Mobile at the end of the Seven Years' War, and Daphne passed into British hands and served as the eastern terminal of a ferry across Mobile Bay.

British rule ended in 1783 when the area was surrendered to Spain by the Treaty of Paris (1783). The area remained under Spanish control for more than 30 years. In November 1814, U.S. General Andrew Jackson crossed the bay with 3,000 troops, marched east to Pensacola, and defeated the British thus finalizing American control over Daphne.

==== Civil War era ====
Secession and the Civil War came quickly following the election of 1860. Statistics are not available for Daphne, but in Baldwin County 65% of homes held at least one slave. On January 11, 1861, Alabama seceded from the Union. It joined the Confederate States of America on March 13, 1861. The town was named the county seat of Baldwin County, Alabama, in 1868 after the previous county seat, Blakeley, was deserted following the Civil War. At that time, Daphne was known as The Village of Bell Rose. Daphne was officially named and established, although unincorporated, on April 9, 1874, when the Post Office for Daphne was opened.

=== Immigration ===
Baldwin County saw many distinct immigrant groups move to the area during the late 19th Century, particularly from Western Europe, and Daphne was the site of the first group that arrived in 1888. Alesandro Mastro Valero purchased land in Daphne as a refuge for Italian immigrants looking for a more pastoral alternative to the large urban cities of the north. In June 1895, land was purchased in Daphne for a Catholic church in what is now the center of Old Daphne, and it was built by the early Italian colonists. Father Angelo Chiariglione, a Scalbrini missionary from Torino, Italy, was the first resident pastor (1898–1909) of the church, known as the Church of the Assumption. This small-town church quickly gained the recognition of the Queen of Italy, Margherita of Savoy, who in 1898 sent a gift of rich vestments, an illuminated missal, a chalice, monstrance, candlesticks, and other articles, and all are still on display in the present Christ the King Catholic Church, the cornerstone of which was laid in 1937.

=== Relocation of county seat ===
Daphne remained the county seat until a legislative act of 1900, when the county seat was moved to Bay Minette. Daphne residents resisted the change and would not allow the county records to be removed. Those records were taken in a late night raid and moved to Bay Minette. According to another account given in 1956 in an interview of one of the persons involved in the transfer, there was no raid; the arrangements for the move were made in advance between officials in both towns, and the county records were quietly loaded into wagons over a five-hour period on the evening of October 11, 1901, and then driven to Bay Minette the next day.

=== Incorporation ===
On July 8, 1927, Daphne was officially formed with a request for incorporation signed by 41 landowners. The initial population was listed as 500 residents. On September 19, 1927, the town held its first election. The first Mayor was James M. Voltz. An attempt in 1946 to revoke incorporation by unhappy residents failed.

=== Hurricane Danny ===
In July 1997, Hurricane Danny struck the Gulf Coast, bringing high winds and rains to the area. Due to the abnormal development of the storm, winds blew water out of Mobile Bay making it almost possible to walk across it. Hurricane Ivan made landfall in September 2004, south of Daphne near Gulf Shores, Alabama. The Category 3 storm caused widespread flooding and damage throughout Daphne. The next year, Daphne weathered some effects of Hurricane Katrina, although not nearly as severe as the 2004 storm.

=== Laws ===
In February 2008, Daphne became the last of the large cities in Baldwin County to enact a public smoking ban. After contentious council meetings, the ban was passed while exempting bars, private clubs, and up to 30% of rooms in a hotel.

In November 2010, the Daphne City Council enacted a ban against texting while driving, becoming the first Mobile-area municipality to do so.

== Geography ==
Daphne is one of three cities that are collectively known as the Eastern Shore by locals. They are Spanish Fort to the north, Daphne in the center and Fairhope to the south.

The topography of Daphne is quite consistent from a gently sloping sea level on the west to low rolling hills further east. Generally, the entire city lies no more than 150 feet above sea level. The land along the Daphne bay coast, like other land throughout the county, is rich with sandy-loam type soils.

According to the U.S. Census Bureau, the city has a total area of 14.1 square miles (37 km^{2}), of which 13.5 square miles (35 km^{2}) are land and 0.6 square miles (1.6 km^{2}) (4.47%) is water.

Daphne is also known as the "Jubilee City." A Jubilee in Mobile Bay occurs when crab, shrimp, and other sea life from the waters of Mobile Bay are suddenly found washed ashore along the coastline. Biologists believe the phenomenon is due to a possible decrease in water oxygen levels which force the fish to the surface.

Nearby communities include: Fairhope, Spanish Fort, Loxley, Mobile, Point Clear, Robertsdale, Silverhill, Summerdale, Gulf Shores, Orange Beach, Bay Minette, Foley, Magnolia Springs, Elberta, Belforest, and Malbis.

=== Climate ===
Climate data for Daphne, Alabama
Month	Jan	Feb	Mar	Apr	May	Jun	Jul	Aug	Sep	Oct	Nov	Dec	Year
Mean daily maximum °F (°C)	61 (16)	65 (18)	71 (22)	78 (26)	85 (29)	89 (32)	91 (33)	91 (33)	88 (31)	80 (27)	72 (22)	64 (18)	78 (26)
Mean daily minimum °F (°C)	39 (4)	43 (6)	49 (9)	55 (13)	64 (18)	71 (22)	73 (23)	72 (22)	68 (20)	57 (14)	49 (9)	42 (6)	57 (14)
Average precipitation inches (mm)	5.64 (143)	5.76 (146)	5.73 (146)	4.44 (113)	4.91 (125)	6.60 (168)	8.05 (204)	7.20 (183)	5.94 (151)	4.25 (108)	4.98 (126)	4.57 (116)	68.07 (1,729)
Source: weather.com

== Demographics ==
Historical population
Census	Pop.	Note	%±
1890	549		—
1930	582		—
1940	630		8.2%
1950	1,041		65.2%
1960	1,527		46.7%
1970	2,382		56.0%
1980	3,406		43.0%
1990	11,290		231.5%
2000	16,581		46.9%
2010	21,570		30.1%
2020	27,462		27.3%
2025 (est.)	31,396	▲	14.3%
U.S. Decennial Census; 2018 Estimate

Daphne, like the surrounding Baldwin and Mobile counties, was settled by persons of varying nationalities who eventually melded into the American experiment.

=== Racial and ethnic composition ===
Daphne city, Alabama – Racial and ethnic composition Note: the US Census treats Hispanic/Latino as an ethnic category. This table excludes Latinos from the racial categories and assigns them to a separate category. Hispanics/Latinos may be of any race. Race and ethnicity was not surveyed for populations under 2,500 in the 1980 census and under 1,000 in 1990 census.
Race / Ethnicity (NH = Non-Hispanic)	Pop 1980	Pop 1990	Pop 2000	Pop 2010	Pop 2020	% 1980	% 1990	% 2000	% 2010	% 2020
White alone (NH)	1,961	9,321	13,982	17,715	21,405	57.57%	82.56%	84.33%	82.13%	77.94%
Black or African American alone (NH)	1,440	1,786	2,039	2,520	2,924	42.28%	15.82%	12.30%	11.68%	10.65%
Native American or Alaska Native alone (NH)	0	29	42	90	104	0.00%	0.26%	0.25%	0.42%	0.38%
Asian alone (NH)	0	46	100	334	405	0.00%	0.41%	0.60%	1.55%	1.47%
Native Hawaiian or Pacific Islander alone (NH)	x	x	1	10	21	x	x	0.01%	0.05%	0.08%
Other race alone (NH)	0	1	20	35	80	0.00%	0.01%	0.12%	0.16%	0.29%
Mixed race or Multiracial (NH)	x	x	143	246	1,275	x	x	0.86%	1.14%	4.64%
Hispanic or Latino (any race)	5	107	254	620	1,248	0.15%	0.95%	1.53%	2.87%	4.54%
Total	3,406	11,290	16,581	21,570	27,462	100.00%	100.00%	100.00%	100.00%	100.00%

=== 2020 census ===
As of the 2020 census, Daphne had a population of 27,462. The median age was 40.1 years. 22.5% of residents were under the age of 18 and 18.6% of residents were 65 years of age or older. For every 100 females there were 92.5 males, and for every 100 females age 18 and over there were 89.2 males age 18 and over.

99.6% of residents lived in urban areas, while 0.4% lived in rural areas.

There were 11,195 households and 6,254 families in Daphne; 30.8% of households had children under the age of 18 living in them. Of all households, 51.0% were married-couple households, 16.6% were households with a male householder and no spouse or partner present, and 26.9% were households with a female householder and no spouse or partner present. About 27.8% of all households were made up of individuals and 11.0% had someone living alone who was 65 years of age or older.

There were 12,157 housing units, of which 7.9% were vacant. The homeowner vacancy rate was 2.4% and the rental vacancy rate was 10.6%.

=== 2010 census ===
As of the census of 2010, there were 21,570 people, 6,563 households, and 4,670 families residing in the city. The population density was 1,230.5 inhabitants per square mile (475.1/km^{2}). There were 10,113 housing units in the city. The racial makeup of the city was 84.10% White, 11.8% Black or African American, 1.51% Asian, 0.40% Native American, 0.01% Pacific Islander, 0.9% from other races, and 1.2% from two or more races. 2.9% of the population were Hispanic or Latino of any race.

There were 8,889 households, out of which 28.8% had children under the age of 18 living with them, 52.5% were married couples living together, 10.4% had a female householder with no husband present, and 33.5% were non-families. 28.1% of all households were made up of individuals living alone, and 9.3% had someone living alone who was 65 years of age or older. The average household size was 2.41 and the average family size was 2.97.

In the city, the population was spread out, with 25.6% under the age of 18, 6.9% from 18 to 24, 31.6% from 25 to 44, 25.6% from 45 to 64, and 10.3% who were 65 years of age or older. The median age was 38 years. For every 100 females, there were 94.9 males. For every 100 females age 18 and over, there were 92.4 males.

The median income for a household in the city was $52,603, and the median income for a family was $61,563. Males had a median income of $46,576 versus $29,052 for females. The per capita income for the city was $25,597. About 2.6% of families and 4.5% of the population were below the poverty line, including 4.5% of those under age 18 and 7.0% of those age 65 or over.

Daphne's growth, along with the growth of other Eastern Shore communities, has been linked to the growth of nearby Mobile. For years the Eastern Shore communities were a quick vacation destination but as the large municipality grew, Daphne grew too.

== Economy ==
Daphne is a suburb of nearby Mobile, Alabama. In 2007, Daphne saw retail sales of $653,422,000 or $34,438 per capita which compares favorably to the national average of $12,364. The median household income was $62,376 against a national average of $42,934, both measured through the 2007–2011 period. The home ownership was 74.6% and the median home value (2007–2011) was $187,000. The city is part of the Daphne-Fairhope-Foley metropolitan statistical area and was named among the top 10 such areas nationwide by Site Selection Magazine. The ranking is for areas with less than 200,000 population and is based upon the number of companies either expanding or relocating to the area.

Primary employment in Daphne is divided among education, healthcare and social assistance employers. Retail trade operations are a close second. Agriculture, once a primary foundation of the Daphne economy, now represents less than 0.6% of economic output. The economy is further supported by access to nearby Mobile, and large retail operations in Spanish Fort, just to the north. The largest employer in the county is the Baldwin County Board of Education which supports over 3,000 employees in Baldwin County. 70% of the $305 million budget pays salaries countywide.

Like much of the nation, Daphne saw the economy plummet during the 2008 recession. Commercial real estate prices were especially hard hit. Investors who looked for a continued rise in values in Daphne were surprised to see their investments bottom out by 2012. However construction is underway by Airbus to build the A320 commercial jet at nearby Brookley Field in Mobile. That assembly plant is expected to generate 1,000 new jobs by 2018 and is expected to positively impact Daphne and the entire Baldwin County.

== Parks and recreation ==
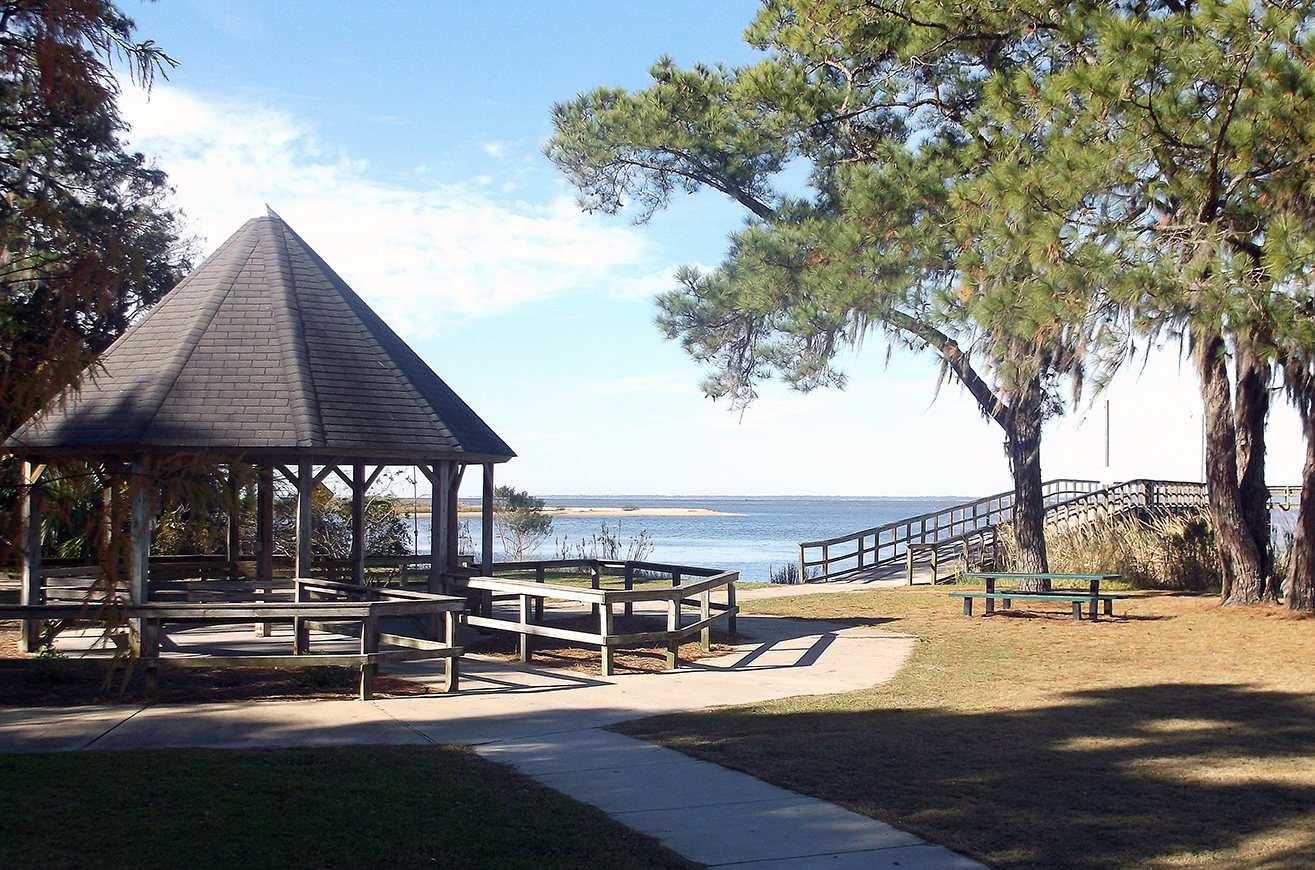
A portion of Bayfront Park overlooking Mobile Bay

Daphne's parks include:

- Daphne Sports Complex - opened in 2019, a ten field baseball and softball complex.
- Trione Park - a multi-field sports complex with football, soccer, softball/baseball fields.
- Lott Park - located in Olde Towne Daphne, includes new tennis and pickleball courts opened in 2020, a legacy playground, bocce, basketball and practice baseball/softball facilities.
- Centennial Park - children's playground located across from Daphne City Hall on Main Street.
- May Day Park - Waterfront park that includes a large playground for young children, a boat launch and a pier on Mobile Bay.
- Bayfront Park - Waterfront drive up park overlooking to the bay. A boardwalk entrance to Village Point Park Preserve. Currently closed, and is expected to be until Spring of 2027.
- Village Point Park Preserve -the largest park in Daphne with walking trails in a natural setting. The park is an estuary for wildlife and is also home to the historic D'olive family cemetery .

The Daphne Civic Center is a city-owned facility used to host special events in the community. Constructed at a cost of $6 million, it opened to the public in December 1999. A senior citizens activity center and the Daphne Public Library are also located in the civic center complex.

== Government ==
Daphne is incorporated in Baldwin County, Alabama. It is governed by a mayor and city council, both of which are elected by popular vote every four years. A semi-autonomous Utilities Board and Zoning Commission support the governance of the city. Daphne's current mayor is Robin LeJeune who is serving his first term as Mayor. Mayor LeJeune also served as council member and Council President. LeJeune was elected in the 2020 municipal election.

A seven-member city council serves the city of Daphne. Council members are selected within districts. The council is composed of the following: district one councilwoman Tommie Conaway, district two councilman Steve Olen, district three councilman Joel Coleman, district four councilman Doug Goodlin, district five councilman and council president Ron Scott, district six councilman and council president pro-tem Benjamin Hughes, and district seven councilwoman Angie Phillips.

A semi-autonomous Utilities Board and Zoning Commission support the governance of the city.

Daphne is part of Alabama's 1st congressional district and is represented by Congressman Barry Moore.

=== Emergency Services ===
Fire protection is provided by the Daphne Fire Department.

Emergency Medical Services are provided by MedStar.

Law enforcement agency is the Daphne Police Department.

== Education ==
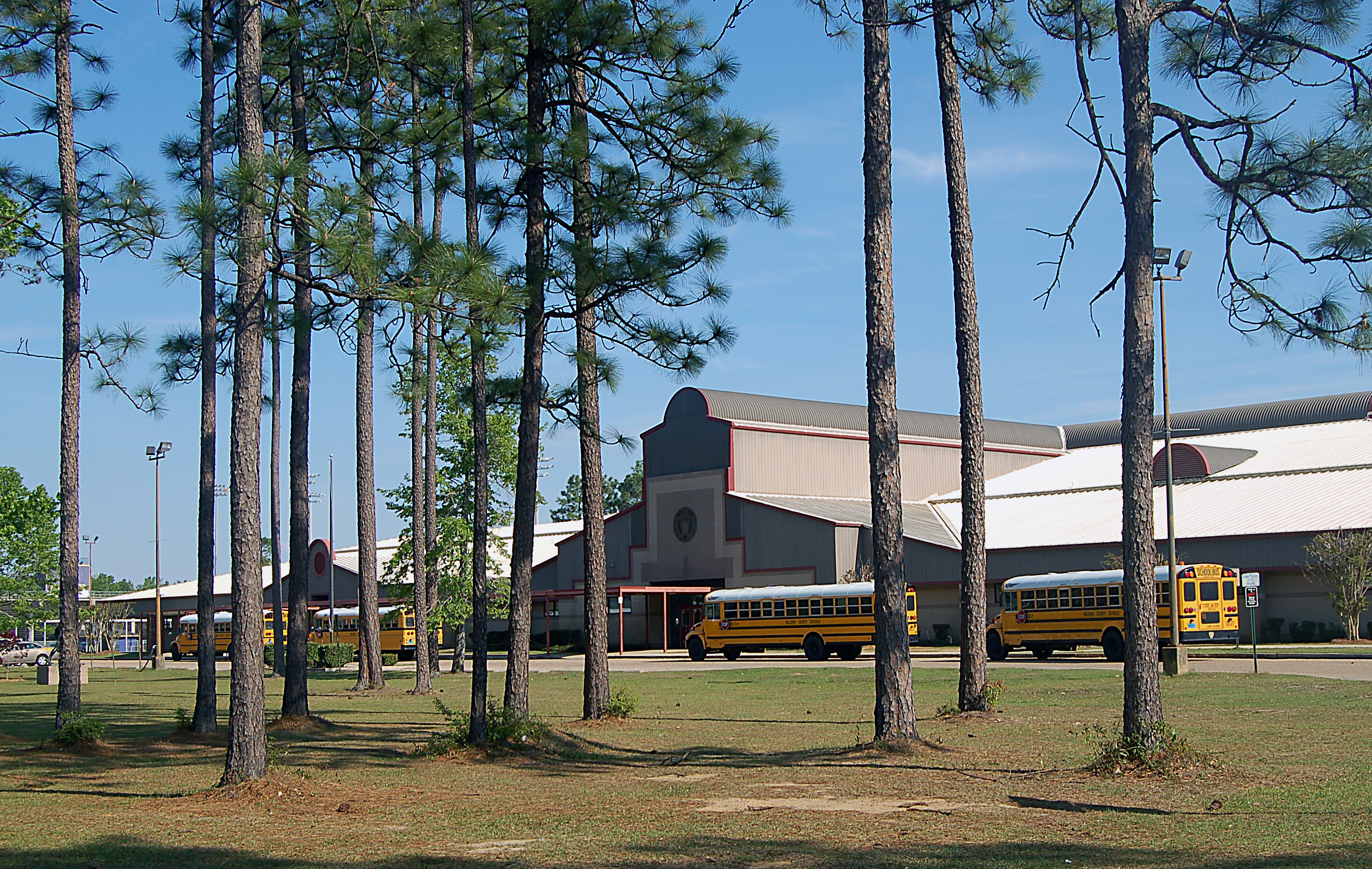
Daphne High School

Public schools in Daphne are part of the Baldwin County Board of Education system which serves over 30,000 students throughout the county. The 2013–2014 budget was $305 million.

There are three elementary schools: Daphne East Elementary School (K-6), Daphne Elementary School North Campus (K-3) and W.J. Carroll Intermediate School (Daphne South) (4–6). Daphne Middle School serves 7th and 8th grade while Daphne High School educates grades 9–12. Three private schools serve the Daphne area, Bayside Academy (K-12), Christ the King Catholic School(CTKCS) (K-8), and Bayshore Christian School (PreK-12). A highly regarded public secondary school, Daphne High School extends progressive and globally-oriented offerings in its curriculum, such as its then-controversial Arabic language classes begun in August 2013.

Two schools offer collegiate curriculum in Daphne. Huntingdon College has a comprehensive graduate school in Daphne that focuses on business and professional graduate programs. The United States Sports Academy is an independent school offering sport-specific residential and online distance learning programs. In addition, it houses the American Sport Art Museum and Archives.

== Infrastructure ==
=== Transportation ===
For many years Daphne was isolated from the larger city of Mobile. A ferry was the only mode of transport from the eastern shore to the western shore. In 1929 a toll bridge was opened which crossed into Mobile. That bridge was replaced by the Cochrane-Africatown bridge. Also in 1929, US 98 was paved from Pensacola, through Daphne and into Mobile.

Interstate 10 travels near the northern border of Daphne. There are three exits into Daphne including intersections with US 98, US 90 and AL 181. Major routes within the city are grid style and include Baldwin County 13, Whispering Pine Road and Daphne Avenue.

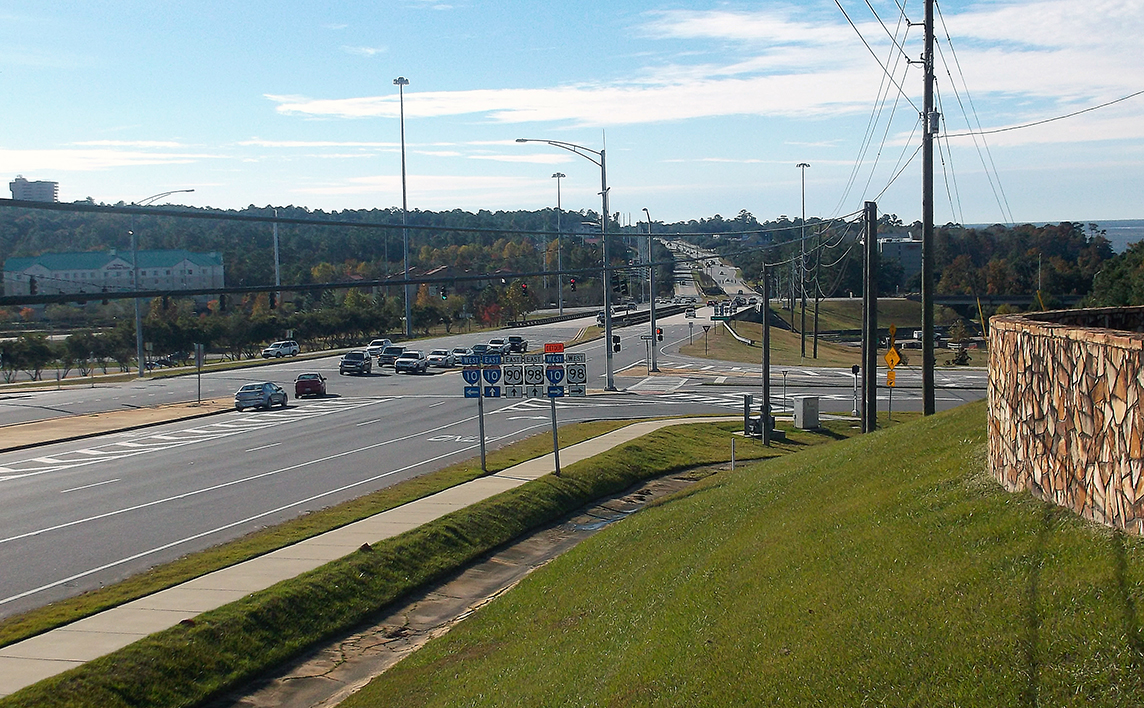
Looking south into Daphne, Alabama at the intersections of I-10, US90 and US98. Mobile Bay is to the right.

The city is served by the Baldwin Rural Area Transportation Service, BRATS, a fare-based bus service which connects most cities in Baldwin County. Service also includes connector service to Mobile.

There is no rail or air service in Daphne. Scheduled commercial air service is offered at Mobile Regional Airport and the Pensacola International Airport. Both airports provide service to most major airline hubs.

=== Utilities ===
Daphne Public Utilities provides water, sewer and natural gas services to the city. There are about 11,000 water customers, 10,000 sewer customers and 4,000 natural gas customers. The utility operates 12 water wells, seven waste treatment facilities and dozens of pumping stations throughout the city. In 2009, the Utilities board was selected by The Wall Street Journal as one of the top 35 small workplaces in America. In 2010 the U.S. Environmental Protection Agency named Daphne Utilities as the best large groundwater utility in eight southeastern states. In October 2013, Daphne Utilities approved a water and sewage rate hike of $21 million over three years. The rate hike will cover expenses related to expansion and compliance with federal regulations. The average increase will amount to $3.66 per month for the average residential customer.

Electrical service is provided by the Foley, Alabama based Riviera Utilities. Riviera resells electric current and has no generation facilities of its own. Landline telephone service is provided by AT&T. The city is in the 251 area code. Land based cable television service is provided by Mediacom.

Because of Daphne's proximity to the coast, all utilities prepare for tropical storms and hurricanes which often impact delivery of services.

== Healthcare ==
Daphne is served by numerous physicians, surgeons, and dentists. Two urgent care facilities offer walk-in service. Outpatient services are provided for diagnostic and surgical interventions. The city is also served by Thomas Hospital, a Level III, 150-bed hospital in Fairhope, Alabama, 5 miles to the south. Across the bay in Mobile, there are several tertiary care facilities.

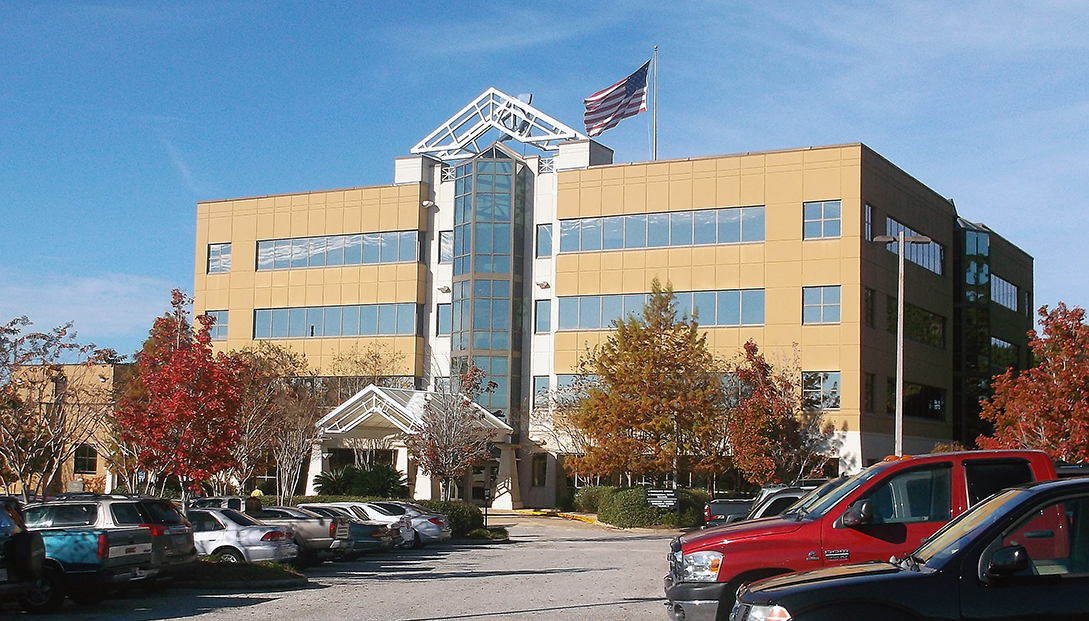
Outpatient facility in Daphne, Alabama

Thomas Hospital is owned by Infirmary Health System of Mobile. The system was named one of the top 57 healthcare systems in the nation in 2011, while Thomas Hospital was ranked as one of the top 20 medium-sized hospitals.

Inpatient rehabilitation services are offered by Mobile Bay Rehabilitation located on the bay in Daphne. The hospital was previously known as Mercy Medical but was sold to SE Healthcare for $9.4 million in 2011. Outpatient rehabilitation services are offered through various practitioners and through physician offices.

== Notable people ==
- Abu Mansoor Al-Amriki, American citizen who was a leader in the Somali Islamist militant group al-Shabaab
- Ryan Anderson, linebacker for the Washington Commanders
- Jeremy Clark, a football player for the New York Giants
- Courtney Duncan, a major league baseball player
- Jimmy Green, professional golfer
- Atlas Herrion, offensive lineman of several NFL and Arena Football League teams
- Joseph Lawson Howze, prelate of the Roman Catholic Church who served as Bishop of Biloxi from 1977 to 2001
- Kenny King (defensive lineman) Former football player for the University of Alabama and Arizona Cardinals
- Eric Lee, defensive end for the New England Patriots
- Michael Pierce, defensive lineman for the Baltimore Ravens
- Bryant Turner, Jr., defensive lineman in the Canadian Football League
- DeWitt Weaver, head coach of the Texas Tech Red Raiders football team from 1951 to 1960
- Pat White, college football player (West Virginia University Mountaineers), 2007 Heisman Trophy finalist
- T. J. Yeldon, running back for the Jacksonville Jaguars
