= Atlas Herrion =

American football player (born 1980)

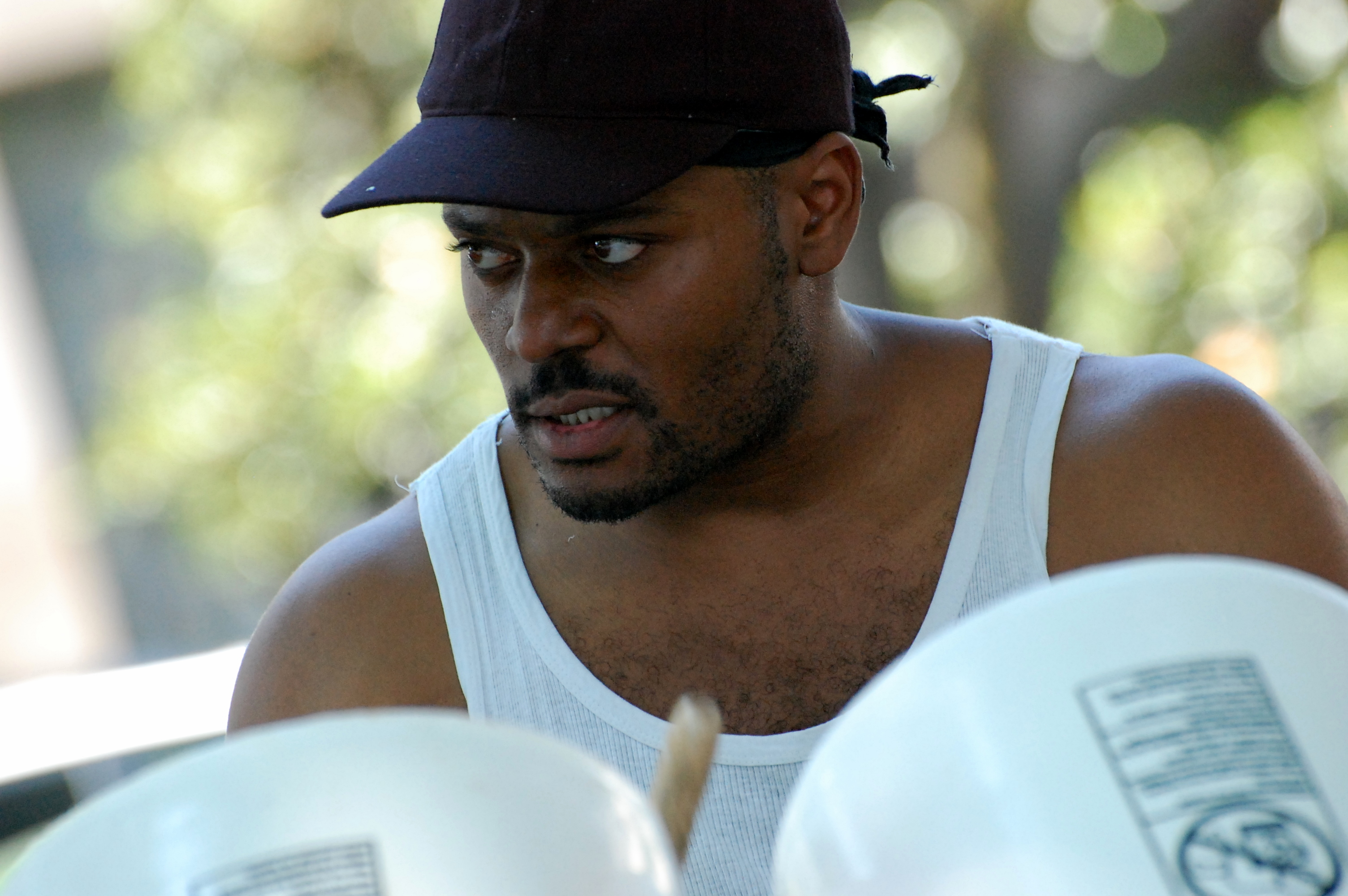

No. 75
- Position: Offensive lineman

Personal information
- Born: December 3, 1980 (age 45); Daphne, Alabama, U.S.
- Listed height: 6 ft 4 in (1.93 m)
- Listed weight: 304 lb (138 kg)

Career information
- High school: Daphne (Daphne, Alabama)
- College: Alabama
- NFL draft: 2004: undrafted

Career history
- Green Bay Packers (2004–2005)*; Cleveland Browns (2005–2006)*; Houston Texans (2006–2007)*; Philadelphia Soul (2007)*; Arizona Rattlers (2008, 2010); San Jose SaberCats (2011); San Antonio Talons (2012)
- * Offseason or practice squad member only

Awards and highlights
- 2× JUCO All-American (2000, 2001)

Career AFL statistics
- Receptions: 5
- Receiving yards: 50
- Tackles: 5
- Stats at ArenaFan.com

Atlas Herrion (born December 3, 1980) is an American former football offensive lineman. He was signed by the Green Bay Packers as an undrafted free agent in 2004. He played college football at Alabama.

Herrion has also been a member of the Cleveland Browns, Houston Texans, Philadelphia Soul, Arizona Rattlers, San Jose SaberCats, and San Antonio Talons.
