= Jeremy Clark =

American football player (born 1983)

No. 63, 73
- Position: Defensive tackle

Personal information
- Born: September 6, 1983 (age 43); Daphne, Alabama, U.S.
- Listed height: 6 ft 2 in (1.88 m)
- Listed weight: 305 lb (138 kg)

Career information
- High school: Daphne
- College: Alabama
- NFL draft: 2007: undrafted

Career history
- Philadelphia Eagles (2007–2008)*; New York Giants (2008); Atlanta Falcons (2009)*; New York Giants (2009)*; Arizona Cardinals (2009); Dallas Cowboys (2010); Washington Redskins (2010); Philadelphia Eagles (2010)
- * Offseason or practice squad member only

Career NFL statistics
- Total tackles: 7
- Stats at Pro Football Reference

Jeremy Terrell Clark (born September 6, 1983) is an American former professional football player who was a defensive end in the National Football League (NFL). He played college football for the Alabama Crimson Tide and was signed by the Philadelphia Eagles as an undrafted free agent in 2007.

Clark was also a member of the New York Giants, Atlanta Falcons, Arizona Cardinals, Dallas Cowboys and Washington Redskins.

== College career ==
Clark was a four-year starter at Alabama, Clark registered 85 tackles, 4.5 sacks, and 8 TFLs during his collegiate career.

== Professional career ==
=== Philadelphia Eagles ===
Clark signed with the Philadelphia Eagles as an undrafted free agent following the 2007 NFL draft on April 30, 2007. He was waived during final cuts on September 1, but was re-signed to the team's practice squad on September 3. He spent the entire 2007 season on the Eagles' practice squad. He was re-signed to a three-year contract on January 2, 2008. He was waived on June 13 before the start of training camp.

=== First stint with Giants ===
Clark signed with the New York Giants on July 27, 2008. He was waived during final cuts on August 30, but was re-signed to the team's practice squad on August 31. He was promoted to the active roster on November 29. He played in four games in 2008, recording four tackles.

He was waived/injured on September 5, 2009, and subsequently reverted to injured reserve. He was released with an injury settlement on September 8.

=== Atlanta Falcons ===
Clark was signed to the Atlanta Falcons' practice squad on September 22, 2009. He was released on December 1.

=== Second stint with Giants ===
Clark was re-signed to the Giants' practice squad on December 4, 2009, where he remained through the end of the regular season.

=== Arizona Cardinals ===
Clark was signed by the Arizona Cardinals on January 5, 2010, after defensive end Jason Banks was placed on injured reserve. He was re-signed to a one-year contract on March 10. He was waived during final cuts following training camp on September 3.

=== Dallas Cowboys ===
Clark was signed by the Dallas Cowboys on November 10, 2010, after Marcus Spears and Akwasi Owusu-Ansah were placed on injured reserve. He was released on December 8.

=== Washington Redskins ===
Clark was signed by the Washington Redskins on December 16, 2010. He was waived on December 25.

=== Second stint with Eagles ===
Clark was signed to a three-year contract by the Philadelphia Eagles on December 30, 2010, after Jeff Owens was placed on injured reserve. He was released on July 28, 2011.
