= Michael Pierce (American football) =

American former football player (born 1992)

No. 78, 97, 58
- Position: Nose tackle

Personal information
- Born: November 6, 1992 (age 34); Daphne, Alabama, U.S.
- Listed height: 6 ft 0 in (1.83 m)
- Listed weight: 355 lb (161 kg)

Career information
- High school: Daphne
- College: Tulane (2011–2012); Samford (2013–2015)
- NFL draft: 2016: undrafted

Career history
- Baltimore Ravens (2016–2019); Minnesota Vikings (2020–2021); Baltimore Ravens (2022–2024)

Career NFL statistics
- Total tackles: 238
- Sacks: 9.5
- Forced fumbles: 3
- Fumble recoveries: 6
- Pass deflections: 5
- Pass interceptions: 1
- Stats at Pro Football Reference

Michael Pierce (born November 6, 1992) is an American former professional football player who was a nose tackle for the Baltimore Ravens and Minnesota Vikings of the National Football League (NFL). He played college football for the Tulane Green Wave before transferring to the Samford Bulldogs. Pierce was signed by the Ravens as an undrafted free agent in 2016, where he spent the next four seasons. He signed with the Minnesota Vikings in 2020 and played there for two seasons before returning to the Ravens in 2022. Pierce announced his retirement on March 12, 2025.

== Professional career ==
=== Pre-draft ===
Pierce was not invited to the NFL Combine. At his Pro Day, he ran 10 meter split faster than any defensive lineman at the combine (1.67 vs Alex McCalister's 1.68) and performed a broad jump inside the Top 15 for defensive lineman.

Pre-draft measurables
| Height | Weight | Arm length | Hand span | 40-yard dash | 10-yard split | 20-yard split | Vertical jump | Broad jump | Bench press |
|---|---|---|---|---|---|---|---|---|---|
| 6 ft 0 3/8 in (1.84 m) | 329 lb (149 kg) | 31 5/8 in (0.80 m) | 9 5/8 in (0.24 m) | 5.01 s | 1.67 s | 2.84 s | 27 in (0.69 m) | 9 ft 7 in (2.92 m) | 28 reps |
All values from Pro Day

=== Baltimore Ravens (first stint) ===
On May 3, 2016, Pierce signed with the Baltimore Ravens as an undrafted free agent. As a rookie in the 2016 season, Pierce appeared in all 16 games and finished the season with 35 tackles, two sacks, and one pass defended. On September 10, in the 2017 season opener against the Cincinnati Bengals, Pierce recovered a Terrell Suggs-forced fumble, which came off of quarterback Andy Dalton, in the 20–0 victory. On March 9, 2019, the Ravens placed a second-round restricted free agent tender on Pierce. On May 1, the Ravens re-signed Pierce.

=== Minnesota Vikings ===
On March 25, 2020, Pierce signed a three-year, $27 million contract with the Minnesota Vikings. On July 28, Pierce announced he would opt out of the 2020 season due to the COVID-19 pandemic, and was placed on the reserve/opt-out list by the Vikings.

Pierce returned in 2021 as a starting defensive tackle. He started the first four games before suffering an elbow injury in Week 4. He missed the next four games before being placed on injured reserve on November 13, 2021. Pierce was activated on December 4.

Pierce was released on March 15, 2022.

=== Baltimore Ravens (second stint) ===
On March 17, 2022, Pierce signed a three-year, $16.5 million contract with the Ravens. He suffered a torn biceps in Week 3 and was placed on season-ending injured reserve on September 29.

Pierce entered the 2023 season as the starting nose tackle for the Ravens. On January 6, 2024, he signed a two-year, $7.5 million contract extension through the 2025 season.

In 2025, Pierce recorded his first career interception late in the fourth quarter during Baltimore's season finale against the Cleveland Browns. At 355 pounds, Pierce became the heaviest NFL player to record an interception since at least 2000. In 11 appearances for Baltimore, Pierce recorded 1 interception, 2 pass deflections, 2.0 sacks, and 19 combined tackles.

On March 12, 2025, Pierce announced his retirement from the NFL.

== NFL career statistics ==
Regular season statistics
| Year | Team | Games | | Tackles | | | | | Interceptions | | | | | | | Fumbles | | |
| Year | Team | GP | GS | Comb | Solo | Ast | Sck | TFL | PD | Int | Yds | Avg | Lng | TD | FF | FR | Yds | TD |
|---|---|---|---|---|---|---|---|---|---|---|---|---|---|---|---|---|---|---|
| 2016 | BAL | 16 | 1 | 35 | 19 | 16 | 2.0 | 5 | 1 | 0 | 0 | 0 | 0 | 0 | 0 | 0 | 0 | 0 |
| 2017 | BAL | 16 | 13 | 49 | 32 | 17 | 1.0 | 2 | 0 | 0 | 0 | 0 | 0 | 0 | 0 | 2 | 0 | 0 |
| 2018 | BAL | 14 | 2 | 32 | 20 | 12 | 0.0 | 1 | 1 | 0 | 0 | 0 | 0 | 0 | 0 | 1 | 0 | 0 |
| 2019 | BAL | 14 | 14 | 35 | 19 | 16 | 0.5 | 2 | 0 | 0 | 0 | 0 | 0 | 0 | 0 | 1 | 2 | 0 |
| 2020 | MIN | 0 | 0 | Opted out due to COVID-19 | | | | | | | | | | | | | | |
| 2021 | MIN | 8 | 8 | 20 | 12 | 8 | 3.0 | 3 | 0 | 0 | 0 | 0 | 0 | 0 | 1 | 0 | 0 | 0 |
| 2022 | BAL | 3 | 3 | 6 | 4 | 2 | 0.0 | 0 | 0 | 0 | 0 | 0 | 0 | 0 | 1 | 0 | 0 | 0 |
| 2023 | BAL | 17 | 17 | 42 | 24 | 18 | 1.0 | 1 | 2 | 0 | 0 | 0 | 0 | 0 | 1 | 2 | 0 | 0 |
| 2024 | BAL | 11 | 1 | 19 | 6 | 13 | 2.0 | 2 | 2 | 1 | 6 | 6.0 | 6 | 0 | 0 | 0 | 0 | 0 |
| Career | | 99 | 59 | 238 | 136 | 102 | 9.5 | 20 | 6 | 1 | 6 | 6.0 | 0 | 0 | 3 | 6 | 2 | 0 |
