= Eric Lee (American football) =

American football player (born 1994)

No. 61, 47, 75, 55, 45
- Position: Defensive end

Personal information
- Born: August 6, 1994 (age 32); Panama City, Florida, U.S.
- Listed height: 6 ft 3 in (1.91 m)
- Listed weight: 255 lb (116 kg)

Career information
- High school: Daphne (Daphne, Alabama)
- College: South Florida
- NFL draft: 2016: undrafted

Career history
- Houston Texans (2016–2017)*; Buffalo Bills (2017); New England Patriots (2017); Detroit Lions (2018–2019); New England Patriots (2019)*
- * Offseason or practice squad member only

Career NFL statistics
- Total tackles: 25
- Sacks: 3.5
- Forced fumbles: 0
- Fumble recoveries: 0
- Interceptions: 1
- Stats at Pro Football Reference

Eric Lee (born August 6, 1994) is an American former professional football player who was a defensive end in the National Football League (NFL). He played college football for the South Florida Bulls and signed as an undrafted free agent with the Houston Texans.

== Professional career ==
=== Houston Texans ===
Lee signed with the Houston Texans as an undrafted free agent on May 6, 2016. He was waived by the Texans on September 3, 2016 and was signed to the practice squad the next day. After spending his entire rookie season on the practice squad, Lee signed a reserve/future contract with the Texans on January 16, 2017.

On September 2, 2017, Lee was waived by the Texans.

=== Buffalo Bills ===
On September 5, 2017, Lee was signed to the Buffalo Bills' practice squad. He was promoted to the active roster on September 29, 2017. He was waived on October 3, 2017 and was re-signed to the practice squad.

=== New England Patriots ===
On November 21, 2017, Lee was signed by the New England Patriots off the Bills' practice squad. He made his NFL debut in Week 12, recording four tackles and his first career sack in a 35-17 win over the Dolphins. The following week he again impressed, gaining 1.5 sacks, 4 tackles, 1 interception, and 1 pass deflection in a 23-3 win against his old team, the Buffalo Bills. Thus bringing him to 8 tackles, 1 interception, 2.5 sacks, and 1 pass deflection in his first 2 games. Lee reached Super Bowl LII with the Patriots, but the team fell short to the Philadelphia Eagles by a score of 41-33.

On September 1, 2018, Lee was waived by the Patriots as part of the roster cutdown.

=== Detroit Lions ===
On September 3, 2018, Lee was signed to the Detroit Lions' practice squad. He was promoted to the active roster on September 29, 2018. He was waived on November 20, 2018 and re-signed to the practice squad. He was promoted back to the active roster on December 5, 2018. He was released during final roster cuts on August 30, 2019. He was re-signed to the Detroit Lions practice squad on September 13, 2019. He was released on October 9.

=== New England Patriots (Second Stint) ===
On December 11, 2019, Lee was signed to the Patriots practice squad. His practice squad contract with the team expired on January 13, 2020.
