= Daphne High School =

Public high school in Daphne, Alabama, United States

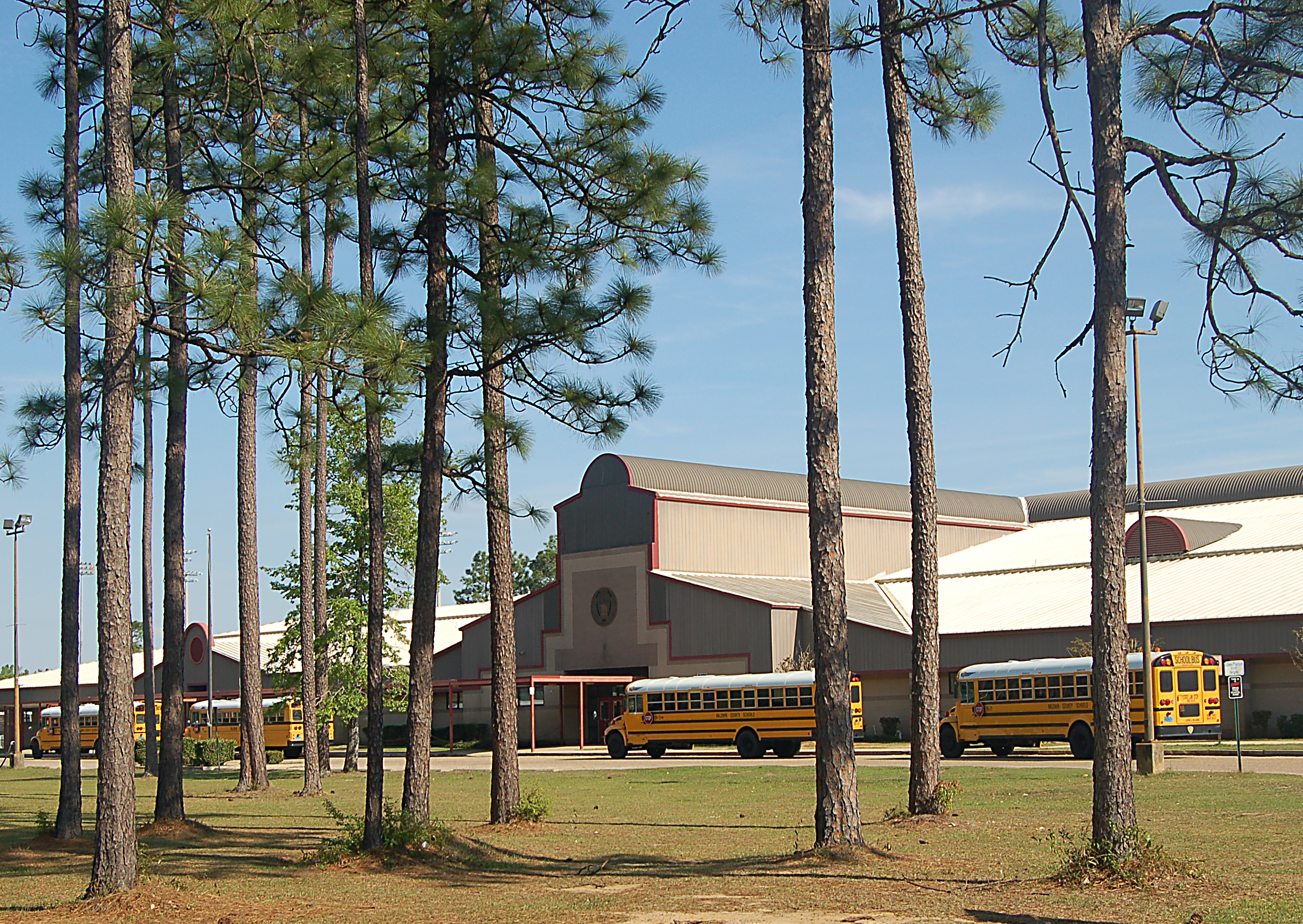
- Daphne High School's main building

Location
- 9300 E Lawson Road; Daphne, Alabama 36526; United States; 30.63883°N 87.86395°W

Information
- School type: Public
- Established: 1989 (37 years ago)
- School district: Baldwin County Public Schools
- CEEB code: 010844
- NCES School ID: 010027001759
- Teaching staff: 96.00 (FTE)
- Grades: 9-12
- Enrollment: 1,799 (2023-2024)
- Student to teacher ratio: 18.74
- Colors: Purple and Gold
- Athletics conference: AHSAA 7A
- Nickname: Trojans
- Website: www.daphnehs.com

Daphne High School is a secondary school in Daphne, Alabama, United States serving grades 9-12. It is part of the Baldwin County Public Schools district. Students who attend the school live in the city of Daphne, its surrounding unincorporated areas, and the city of Loxley. The school's mascot is the Trojan.

As of the 2023–2024 school year, the school has 1,799 students and offers the International Baccalaureate program. In 2012, it was listed as a National Blue Ribbon School.

== History ==
Daphne High School was opened in 1989 with only one main building. Since then, it has had several major additions to its facility. First, There was the addition of a second building on the west end of the school grounds (called the "new wing" by students and alumni). The stadium was then built as part of the school's expanding athletic program. During the summer of 2007, the stadium received new restroom and concession facilities in a multimillion-dollar project. At the same time, Baldwin County Schools purchased a church next door to the school grounds for approx. $4 million, known as Trojan Hall.

== Athletics ==
Daphne High School is classified as a 7A school by the Alabama High School Athletic Association. Daphne won the 6A state football championship game in 2001 and in 2010. In 2013, Daphne finished undefeated in football region play but were defeated in the first round of the state playoffs.

The Trojans finished the 2001 season ranked #15 in the nation in the National Prep Football Poll. The Trojans baseball program won the 4A state title in 1992, and the 5A title in 1993. In 2001 and 2002 the Trojans won the 6A title.

In 2012, the school was awarded the Alabama High School Athletic Association Sportsmanship Award. The award was one of only 8 given to 6A schools which saw no fines and no ejections from any sport during the year.

Daphne assistant football coach Jacy Todd was honored as the Employee of the Year - large business division in 2013 by the Alabama Governor's Committee on Employment of People with disabilities. Todd was paralyzed from the chest down in an auto accident in 2012. He has returned to full-time teaching and coaching and is often seen on the sidelines in a wheelchair.

== Notable alumni ==
- Ryan Anderson, professional football linebacker
- Jeremy Clark, professional football defensive lineman
- Courtney Duncan, professional baseball player for the Chicago Cubs
- Diego Guajardo, college football placekicker for the South Alabama Jaguars
- Omar Shafik Hammami, member and leader in the Islamist militant group Al-Shabaab
- Atlas Herrion, former professional football guard
- Kenny King, professional football defensive tackle for the Arizona Cardinals; Daphne Trojans head football coach
- Eric Lee, professional football defensive end
- Malik McClain, college football wide receiver for the Arizona State Sun Devils (transferred after his junior year)
- Michael Pierce, professional football defensive tackle
- Kyle Smith, Alabama state all-classification record holder for javelin throw
- Patrick White, former quarterback/wide receiver for the Miami Dolphins
- T. J. Yeldon, professional football running back
