= Barnwell, Alabama =

Unincorporated community in Alabama, United States

Barnwell
- Unincorporated community
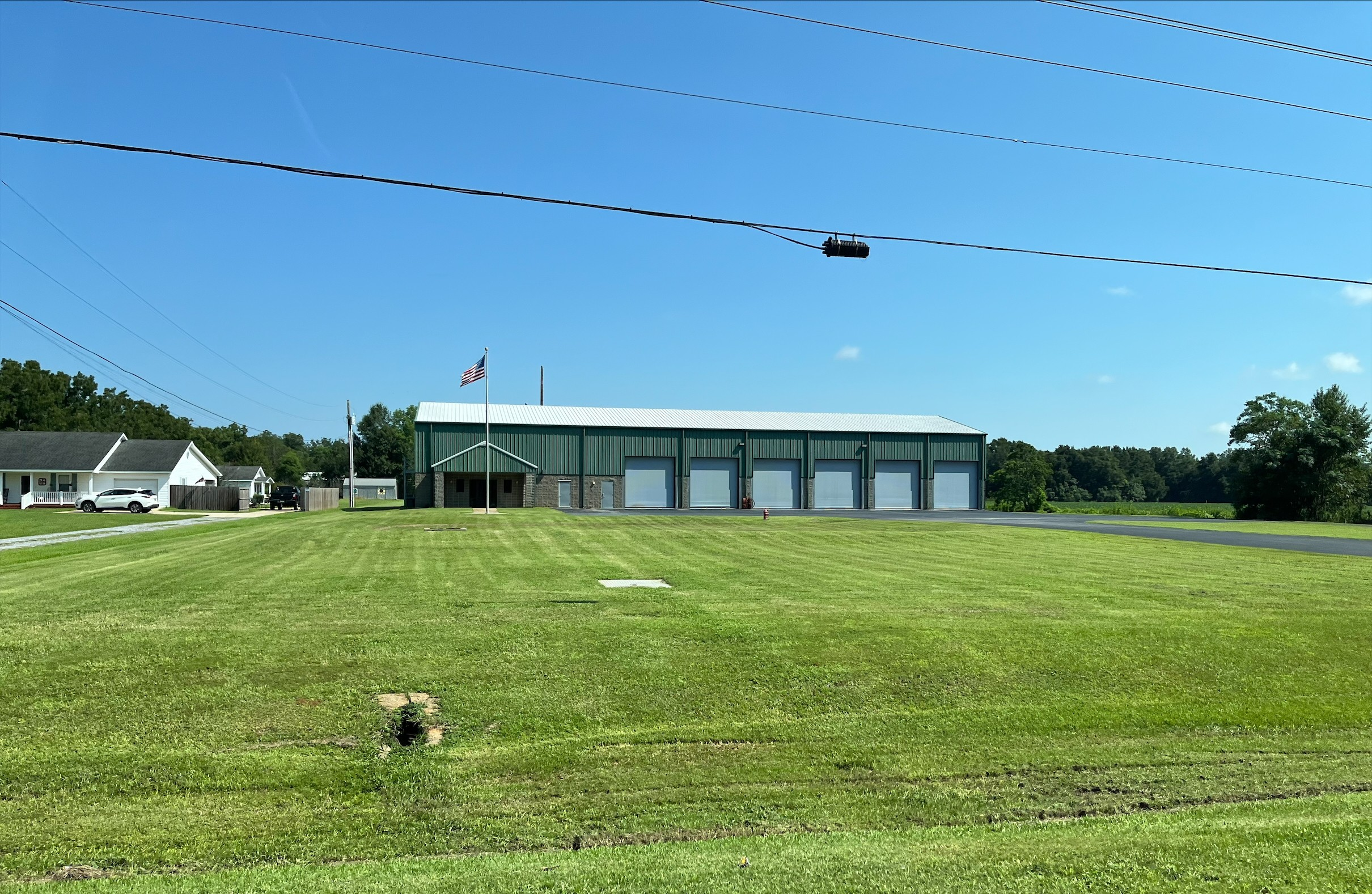
- Barnwell Volunteer Fire Rescue

- Location within the state of Alabama
- Coordinates: 30°25′17″N 87°52′39″W
- Country: United States
- State: Alabama
- County: Baldwin
- Elevation: 72 ft (22 m)
- Time zone: UTC-6 (Central (CST))
  - Summer (DST): UTC-5 (CDT)
- Area code: 251

Barnwell is an unincorporated community in Baldwin County, Alabama, United States. It is located along US 98 in the southern part of the county. Some municipal services are provided by Fairhope. Barnwell is designated by the USGS as a populated place that is neither incorporated nor a census-designated place.

== History ==
Barnwell is named for a local family. A post office operated under the name Barnwell from 1903 to 1942.
