= Baldwin County High School =

Public high school in Bay Minette, Baldwin County, Alabama, United States

Location
- 1 Tiger Drive; Bay Minette, Alabama 36507; United States; 30.89360°N 87.79408°W

Information
- Type: Public
- School district: Baldwin County Public Schools
- CEEB code: 010245
- Principal: Richard Paul
- Teaching staff: 59.75 (FTE)
- Grades: 9-12
- Enrollment: 940 (2024-2025)
- Student to teacher ratio: 15.73
- Colors: Orange and Black
- Athletics: Baseball, cross country, football, basketball, soccer, golf, softball, swimming, track and field, volleyball
- Nickname: Tigers
- Yearbook: Balcoala
- Website: www.baldwincountyhighschool.com

Baldwin County High School is a public high school that serves grades 9-12 in Bay Minette, Baldwin County, Alabama, United States. It is part of the Baldwin County Public Schools. The school's mascot is the tiger.

BCHS is an Apple Distinguished school. Students received MacBook Air laptops during the 2013–14 school year.

Baldwin County High School serves the city of Bay Minette and the unincorporated communities of Bromley, Crossroads, Perdido, Pine Grove, Stapleton, Stockton, White House Fork, among others.

== Feeder patterns ==
The following schools feed into Baldwin County High School:

- Perdido School
- Bay Minette Middle School
- Bay Minette Intermediate School
- Stapleton Elementary School
- Vaughn Elementary School
- Delta Elementary School
- Pine Grove Elementary School

== Notable alumni ==
- Wallace Gilberry, NFL defensive end for the Cincinnati Bengals and formerly for the University of Alabama's Crimson Tide
- Todd Grisham, Current UFC analyst; Former ESPN anchor and commentator for World Wrestling Entertainment
- Anthony Mix, NFL wide receiver who played for the Washington Redskins and Tampa Bay Buccaneers; previously wide receiver at Auburn University
