= Marlow, Alabama =

Unincorporated community in Alabama, United States

- Unincorporated community
- Location within Alabama Location within the United States
- Coordinates: 30°27′40″N 87°47′57″W
- Country: United States
- State: Alabama
- County: Baldwin
- Elevation: 43 ft (13 m)
- Time zone: UTC-6 (Central (CST))
  - Summer (DST): UTC-5 (CDT)
- Area code: 251
- GNIS feature ID: 122291

Marlow is an unincorporated community in Baldwin County, Alabama, United States.

== History ==
The community is named in honor of a local Methodist church. A post office operated under the name Marlow from 1887 to 1909.

Marlow is the former site of Marlow Ferry. The ferry was used by Andrew Jackson and his troops during the War of 1812 and by the Union Army during the American Civil War. The ferry crossed the Fish River, and was an originating point for produce headed to Mobile.
