= Oyster Bay, Alabama =

Unincorporated community in Alabama, United States

- Unincorporated community
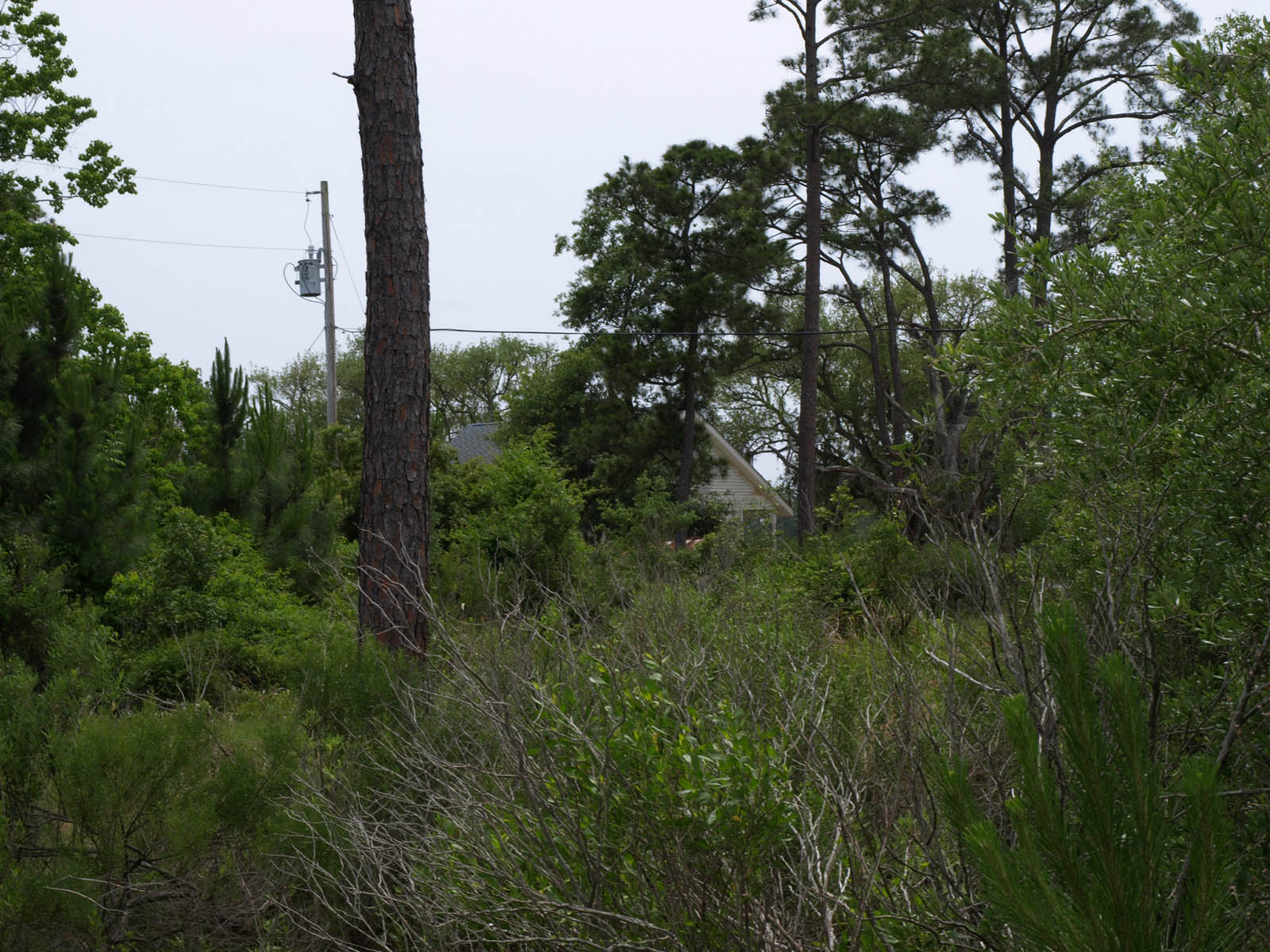
- Nicholson House

- Location within Alabama Location within the United States
- Coordinates: 30°17′08″N 87°44′35″W
- Country: United States
- State: Alabama
- County: Baldwin
- Elevation: 10 ft (3.0 m)
- Time zone: UTC-6 (Central (CST))
  - Summer (DST): UTC-5 (CDT)
- Postal code: 36574
- Area code: 251
- GNIS feature ID: 134656

Oyster Bay is an unincorporated community in Baldwin County, Alabama, United States. Oyster Bay is located at the mouth of the Bon Secour River into Bon Secour Bay, 3.4 miles (5.5 km) west of Gulf Shores. The Nicholson House, which is listed on the National Register of Historic Places, is located in Oyster Bay.
