= Mobile Point =

Coordinates: 30.226898°N 88.026656°W

Mobile Point is the apex of a long, low, narrow, sandy peninsula between the Gulf of Mexico on the south and Bon Secour Bay and Navy Cove on the north. The point is the eastern limit of the entrance into Mobile Bay, which it partially encloses. It is located in Baldwin County, Alabama. At its western tip is Fort Morgan, which faces Fort Gaines sitting across the inlet to the Mobile Bay, on Dauphin Island. Along the point is the unincorporated community of Fort Morgan, Alabama.
