= Marlow Ferry =

Coordinates: 30.45988°N 87.80419°W

Marlow Ferry, located in Baldwin County, Alabama, United States, is the former site of a ferry which crossed Fish River. It is also the location of two important events from the American Civil War and the War of 1812.

== War of 1812 ==
In 1815, United States General Andrew Jackson camped at Marlow Ferry and foraged for food while preparing his troops to travel westward and defend New Orleans against British attack. The troops encamped at Marlow Ferry also defended Pensacola and Fort Bowyer, which came to be known as Fort Morgan.

== American Civil War ==
In 1865, Union troops sailed from Dauphin Island, Alabama to Marlow Ferry and then marched on to link up with other Union troops. The combined forces, the Union XIII and XVI, marched north and attacked Confederate troops defending Spanish Fort, Alabama and Fort Blakeley. Union troops constructed a pontoon bridge to cross the river.

== Present day ==
The ferry no longer operates but the landing is now part of the Baldwin County Parks System. Military re-enactors demonstrate period uniforms, equipment and life during weekend re-enactments.
