= Clay City, Alabama =

Unincorporated community in Alabama, United States

- Unincorporated community
- Location within Alabama Location within the United States
- Coordinates: 30°29′09″N 87°48′24″W
- Country: United States
- State: Alabama
- County: Baldwin
- Elevation: 16 ft (4.9 m)
- Time zone: UTC-6 (Central (CST))
  - Summer (DST): UTC-5 (CDT)
- Area code: 251
- GNIS feature ID: 116199

Clay City is an unincorporated community in Baldwin County, Alabama, United States.

== History ==
The community is named for the surrounding deposits of clay.

Clay City was formerly home to brick and tile manufacturers. The tile used in the former Fairhope City Hall was made in Clay City. The first pottery works in Clay City was established on the banks of the Fish River in 1850, and remained in operation until 1900. Another pottery works was established in 1940, and its kilns can still be seen today.
