= Seminole, Alabama =

- Unincorporated community
- Location within Alabama Location within the United States
- Coordinates: 30°30′55″N 87°28′26″W
- Country: United States
- State: Alabama
- County: Baldwin
- Elevation: 98 ft (30 m)
- Time zone: UTC-6 (Central (CST))
  - Summer (DST): UTC-5 (CDT)
- ZIP code: 36574
- Area code: 251
- GNIS feature ID: 126545

Seminole is an unincorporated community in Baldwin County, Alabama, United States. Seminole is located along U.S. Route 90, 14.4 miles (23.2 km) east of Robertsdale.

In the Top Gear: US Special the town's 'State Line Convenience' was the location of an attack on the main presenters by residents angered by slogans written on their cars in 2007.

== History ==
The community is named after the Seminole tribe. A post office operated under the name Seminole from 1894 to 1967.
