= Bon Secour, Alabama =

- Unincorporated community Census-designated place
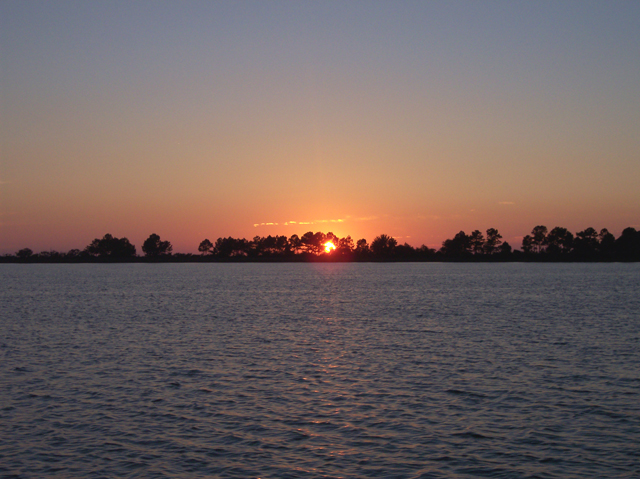
- Looking west over Bon Secour Bay

- Location of Bon Secour in Baldwin County, Alabama.
- Coordinates: 30°19′20″N 87°43′38″W
- Country: United States
- State: Alabama
- County: Baldwin

Area
  - Total: 4.65 sq mi (12.05 km^{2})
  - Land: 4.32 sq mi (11.19 km^{2})
  - Water: 0.33 sq mi (0.86 km^{2})
- Elevation: 10 ft (3.0 m)

Population (2020)
  - Total: 1,754
  - Density: 406.0/sq mi (156.74/km^{2})
- Time zone: UTC-6 (Central (CST))
  - Summer (DST): UTC-5 (CDT)
- ZIP code: 36511
- Area code: 251
- FIPS code: 01-08272
- GNIS feature ID: 2633314

Bon Secour /bɑːn səˈkjuːr/ is an unincorporated community and census-designated place in Baldwin County, Alabama, United States. It lies along the eastern coastline of Bon Secour Bay (a contiguous bay that sits along the eastern edge of Mobile Bay). Bon Secour is over 35 miles (56 km) due east of the Alabama–Mississippi state line, near Gulf Shores, and over 45 miles (72 km) west of Pensacola, Florida. The name "Bon Secour" derives from the French phrase meaning "good help" or "good assistance (succor)." Bon Secour is located at the mouth of the Bon Secour River on Bon Secour Bay. The town shares its name with the Secour National Wildlife Refuge, which lies to the south on the Fort Morgan Peninsula and Dauphin Island.

The town lies about 10 feet (3.0 m) above sea level. The estuarial river system empties into Bon Secour Bay at Mobile Bay.

It is part of the Daphne-Fairhope-Foley metropolitan area.

As of the 2020 census, Bon Secour had a population of 1,754.

It was first listed as a CDP prior to the 2020 Census.

Bon Secour is sometimes mentioned in hurricane report statistics, for the region, since Bon Secour is the easternmost town inside the coastline of Mobile Bay when entering the bay from the south, indicating weather and tide conditions for the population at the southeast end of Mobile Bay, nearest the entrance to the Gulf of Mexico. By contrast, Mobile, Alabama is located near the (diagonally opposite) north end of Mobile Bay, much farther from the Gulf tide and hurricane storm surges.

== History ==
Bon Secour was originally founded by French settlers as a fishing village in the 1700s. Namedsafe harbor in French by Jacques Cook, a French Canadian from Montreal, a member of Pierre Le Moyne d'Iberville's colonizing expedition of 1699. He was a participant in the founding of Mobile in 1702.

=== Hurricanes ===
The location of Bon Secour on the northern coast of the Gulf of Mexico makes it especially vulnerable to hurricanes:

- In September 1979, Bon Secour received the full brunt of Category 3 Hurricane Frederic, which leveled most of the beachfront of the town.
- In September 2004, category 3 Hurricane Ivan made landfall only a few miles from Bon Secour, causing extensive wind and flooding damage. Nearby Orange Beach suffered even greater damage from its location east of Ivan's eyewall. Over 800 homes (mainly condominiums) were destroyed by Ivan.
- Hurricane Katrina (August 29, 2005) flooded Bon Secour with a large storm surge, which had extended over 120 miles (190 km) eastward from the eye, also flooding the Florida Panhandle (such as Navarre Beach). Waves near Bon Secour were 22-feet (6.7 m) high, in Mobile Bay.

=== 2010 Gulf Oil Spill ===
The 2010 Deepwater Horizon oil spill drastically reduced the availability of Gulf shrimp, so many people lost their jobs with the fishing industry. In June 2010, oil globs and submerged oil began washing ashore on the beaches of the Bon Secour National Wildlife Refuge, killing many fish and crabs.

== Geography ==
The town has a total area of 3.4 square miles (8.7 km^{2}), all land, although it lies along the Bon Secour River and bay.

=== Climate ===
Bon Secour enjoys a very mild climate throughout the year. High temperatures in the winter average around 65 degrees; summer-time high temperatures average around 87. Bon Secour also averages 61 inches (1,500 mm) of rainfall per year.

=== Nearby towns ===
- Gulf Shores, Alabama
- Daphne, Alabama
- Foley, Alabama
- Orange Beach, Alabama
- Elberta, Alabama
- Summerdale, Alabama
- Silverhill, Alabama
- Robertsdale, Alabama
- Point Clear, Alabama
- Fairhope, Alabama

== Demographics ==
Historical population
Census	Pop.	Note	%±
2020	1,754		—
U.S. Decennial Census; 1850 1860 1870; 1880 1890-1900; 1910 1920 1930; 1940 1950 1960; 1970 1980 1990; 2000 2010 2020

Bon Secour was first listed as a census designated place in the 2020 U.S. census.

=== 2020 census ===
As of the 2020 census, Bon Secour had a population of 1,754. The median age was 44.1 years. 20.4% of residents were under the age of 18 and 20.5% of residents were 65 years of age or older. For every 100 females there were 95.1 males, and for every 100 females age 18 and over there were 85.9 males age 18 and over.

65.0% of residents lived in urban areas, while 35.0% lived in rural areas.

There were 703 households in Bon Secour, of which 22.6% had children under the age of 18 living in them. Of all households, 53.1% were married-couple households, 19.2% were households with a male householder and no spouse or partner present, and 20.9% were households with a female householder and no spouse or partner present. About 26.2% of all households were made up of individuals and 9.1% had someone living alone who was 65 years of age or older.

There were 910 housing units, of which 22.7% were vacant. The homeowner vacancy rate was 9.5% and the rental vacancy rate was 14.8%.

Bon Secour CDP, Alabama – Racial and ethnic composition Note: the US Census treats Hispanic/Latino as an ethnic category. This table excludes Latinos from the racial categories and assigns them to a separate category. Hispanics/Latinos may be of any race.
Race / Ethnicity (NH = Non-Hispanic)	Pop 2020	% 2020
White alone (NH)	1,428	81.41%
Black or African American alone (NH)	63	3.49%
Native American or Alaska Native alone (NH)	11	0.63%
Asian alone (NH)	6	0.34%
Native Hawaiian or Pacific Islander alone (NH)	1	0.06%
Other race alone (NH)	8	0.46%
Mixed race or Multiracial (NH)	59	3.36%
Hispanic or Latino (any race)	178	10.15%
Total	1,754	100.00%

== Education ==
Bon Secour is served by the Baldwin County Public Schools system, in the nearby town of Foley. An elementary school, an intermediate school, a middle school, and a high school serve Foley.

- Foley High School (grades 9-12)
- Foley Middle School (grades 7-8)
- Foley Elementary School (grades K-6)
- Swift Elementary School (grades PreK-6) - Located in Bon Secour.

== Regional ==
The Bon Secour National Wildlife Refuge (NWR) is not really located in Bon Secour, but nearby, along Ft. Morgan Road, on the island, over the Intracoastal Waterway bridge. The Bon Secour NWR consists of over 6,700 acres (27 km^{2}) of wildlife habitat lying directly west of Gulf Shores, Alabama, on the Fort Morgan peninsula (western sliver of the island) formed by the Intracoastal Waterway, Oyster Bay, Bon Secour Bay, and Mobile Bay. The refuge was established by the United States Congress in 1980 to provide habitat for non-game birds migrating south in the fall and north in the spring. The migration paths from Bon Secour lead south to lower Florida, the Caribbean, Mexico and Central America. The Bon Secour refuge also serves as one of the largest undeveloped parcels of land on the Alabama coast, with sand dunes which are a reminder of the Gulf Coast, as it formerly existed. Consequently, the Bon Secour National Wildlife Refuge has been named among the ten natural wonders of Alabama. It has become a birding Mecca.
