= Perdido =

Perdido is a Spanish and Portuguese word for ‘lost’. It may refer to:

== Places ==
=== Geographical features ===
- Perdido Bay, a bay at the mouth of and draining the Perdido River in Alabama and Florida
- Perdido Key, a barrier island in Alabama and Florida
- Perdido River, in Alabama and Florida, U.S.
- Monte Perdido (French: Mont Perdu), mountain in the Pyrenees

=== Towns and communities ===
- Perdido, Alabama, an unincorporated community in Baldwin County
- Perdido Beach, Alabama, a town in Baldwin County
- Perdido Key, Florida, an unincorporated community on the island

=== Structures ===
- Perdido (oil platform), the deepest oil platform in the world

== Other uses ==
- "Perdido" (song), jazz standard composed by Juan Tizol
- "Perdido", song from WarCry's album ¿Dónde Está La Luz?
- HMS Trouncer (D85), ship also known as USS Perdido
- Perdido Street Station, a novel by China Miéville
