= Elsanor, Alabama =

Unincorporated community in Alabama, United States

- Unincorporated community
- Location within Alabama Location within the United States
- Coordinates: 30°32′43″N 87°35′01″W
- Country: United States
- State: Alabama
- County: Baldwin
- Elevation: 138 ft (42 m)
- Time zone: UTC-6 (Central (CST))
  - Summer (DST): UTC-5 (CDT)
- Area code: 251
- GNIS feature ID: 156313

Elsanor is an unincorporated community in Baldwin County, Alabama, United States. Elsanor is located on U.S. Route 90, 7.7 miles (12.4 km) east of Robertsdale.

== History ==
The community is named for Elsa Norton, whose husband donated the land and money for the community's school.

The community was founded in 1913 and initially settled by French Canadians from North Dakota. In 1965, a community center was constructed to serve the surrounding area and formerly served as a voting precinct.

In 2019, the Baldwin County Historic Development Commission erected a historical marker in Elsanor.

== Education ==
Elsanor is served by Elsanor Elementary, which is part of the Baldwin County Board of Education. The school was founded in 1913.
