= Gateswood, Alabama =

Unincorporated community in Alabama, United States

- Unincorporated community
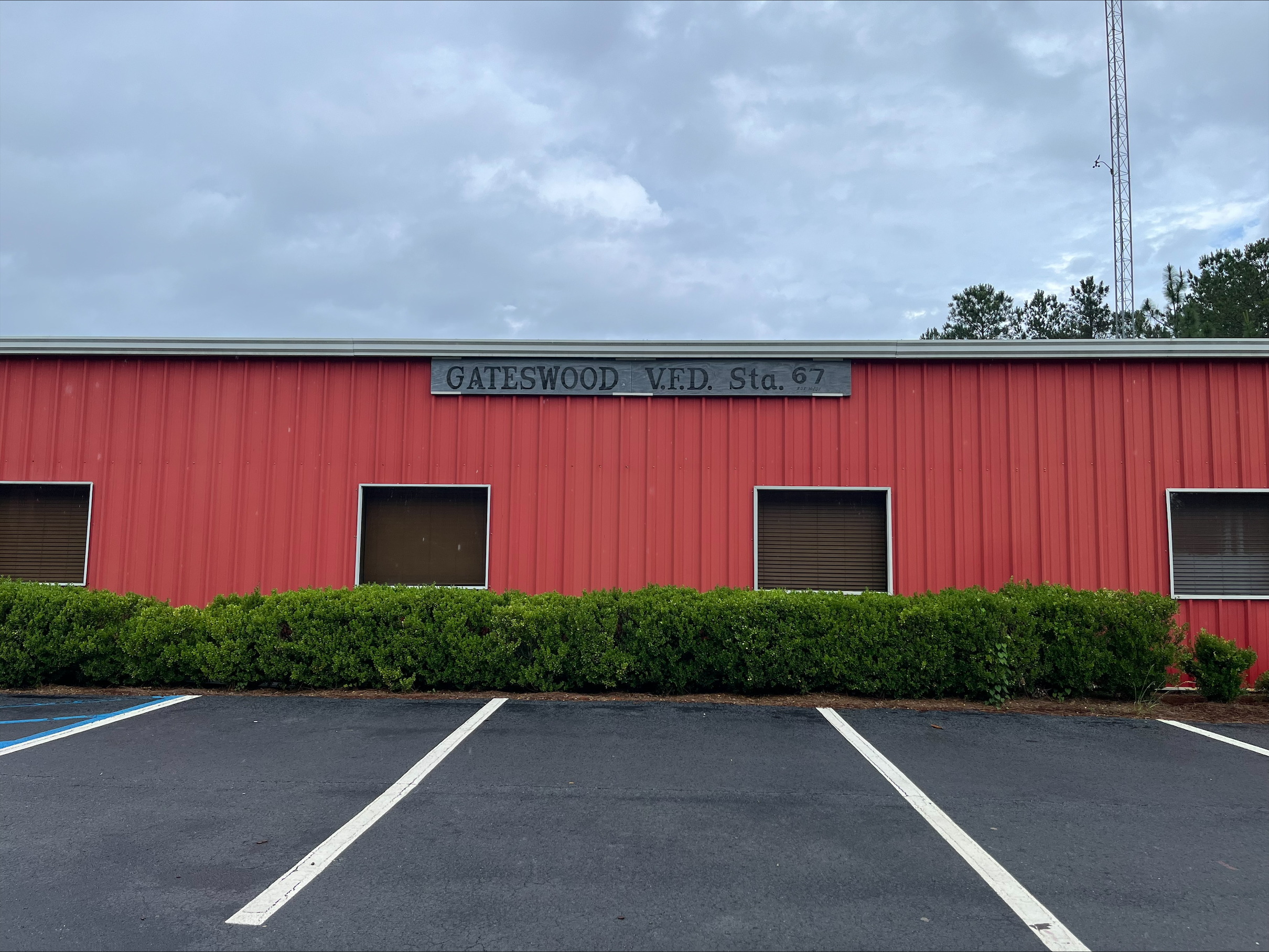
- Gateswood Volunteer Fire Department

- Location within Alabama Location within the United States
- Coordinates: 30°43′16″N 87°34′51″W
- Country: United States
- State: Alabama
- County: Baldwin
- Elevation: 164 ft (50 m)
- Time zone: UTC-6 (Central (CST))
  - Summer (DST): UTC-5 (CDT)
- Area code: 251
- GNIS feature ID: 156398

Gateswood is an unincorporated community in Baldwin County, Alabama, United States.

== History ==
The names Gateswood is a combination of Gates, a local family, and wood. A post office operated under the name Gateswood from 1890 to 1927.

The Owens Naval Stores was founded in 1909 in Gateswood and distilled turpentine.
