= Carpenter's Station, Alabama =

Unincorporated community in Alabama, US

- Unincorporated community
- Location within Alabama Location within the United States
- Coordinates: 30°51′26″N 87°51′58″W
- Country: United States
- State: Alabama
- List of counties in Alabama: Mobile County
- Elevation: 646 ft (197 m)
- Time zone: UTC-6 (Central (CST))
  - Summer (DST): UTC-5 (CDT)

Carpenter's Station is a community located in Baldwin County, Alabama. It appears as "Carpenter" on the Bay Minette South U.S. Geological Survey Map.

== History ==
The community's name commemorates its original settler, Samuel Alexander Carpenter, born November 15, 1795, in Montgomery County, North Carolina, died February 2, 1884, at his home at Carpenter's Station, P.O. Hurricane, Baldwin County, Alabama (west of Bay Minette, Alabama). During the War of 1812 he served in Captain Benjamin Cleveland's company of Tennessee Militia, enlisting on August 24, 1813, and serving for six months; he was honorably discharged on March 3, 1814, and later received a federal government pension for his service. In 1821, he was in the United States Territory of West Florida, where he signed a petition to the U.S. Congress expressing the signers' desire to be annexed to the State of Alabama. On October 25, 1825, he married Aurelia Mary Hall in Baldwin County, Alabama. She was born on January 2, 1807, in Mobile, Alabama, a daughter of Charles and Mary (Byrne) Hall of Baldwin County, both descendants of prominent pioneer families. After their marriage, Samuel and Aurelia lived in Mobile County, Alabama, Escambia County, Florida, and Hancock County, Mississippi, as Samuel pursued a practice as an attorney. One source states that the P.O. received the official designation in 1898 for Aurelius M. Carpenter, who was killed while serving in the army during the Spanish–American War.
