= Bromley, Alabama =

Unincorporated community in Alabama, United States

- Unincorporated community
- Location within Alabama Location within the United States
- Coordinates: 30°44′20″N 87°52′03″W
- Country: United States
- State: Alabama
- County: Baldwin
- Elevation: 95 ft (29 m)
- Time zone: UTC-6 (Central (CST))
  - Summer (DST): UTC-5 (CDT)
- Area code: 251
- GNIS feature ID: 156116

Bromley is an unincorporated community in Baldwin County, Alabama, United States.

== History ==
A post office operated under the name Bromley from 1881 to 1938.

The Little Red Schoolhouse, also known as The Blakely School, was a Rosenwald School built in Bromley in 1920. The school was closed in 1950 and the building was moved to Bay Minette. It has since been restored, and it is now used for living history demonstrations.
