= Crossroads, Alabama =

Unincorporated community in Alabama, United States

- Unincorporated community
- Location within Alabama Location within the United States
- Coordinates: 30°50′06″N 87°51′40″W
- Country: United States
- State: Alabama
- County: Baldwin
- Elevation: 217 ft (66 m)
- Time zone: UTC-6 (Central (CST))
  - Summer (DST): UTC-5 (CDT)
- Area code: 251
- GNIS feature ID: 156234

Crossroads is an unincorporated community in Baldwin County, Alabama, United States. Crossroads is located on Alabama State Route 225, 5.5 miles (8.9 km) southwest of Bay Minette.

== History ==
The community is named due to the fact it is located at a crossroads.
