= Bon Secour River =

River in the United States of America

Location
- Country: United States
- State: Alabama

Physical characteristics
- Source
  - coordinates: 30°24′06″N 87°42′00″W
- Mouth
  - location: Bon Secour Bay
  - coordinates: 30°17′19″N 87°45′11″W

The Bon Secour River is a stream in Baldwin County, Alabama in the United States. It empties into Bon Secour Bay at Mobile Bay.

== See also ==
- List of rivers of Alabama
