= Harry Shiver =

American politician

Member of the Alabama House of Representatives from the 64th district
- In office January 16, 2007 – November 9, 2022
- Preceded by: Greg Albritton
- Succeeded by: Donna Givens

Personal details
- Born: July 13, 1946 (age 80) Bay Minette, Alabama, U.S.
- Party: Republican
- Spouse: Jean
- Education: Livingston University (B.S.); Troy University (M.S.)
- Profession: Teacher

Harry Shiver (born July 13, 1946) is an American politician. He was a member of the Alabama House of Representatives from the 64th District, serving from 2006 to 2022. He is a member of the Republican party. After the 2018 Stoneman Douglas High School shooting, Shiver came out against a proposal to arm teachers in Alabama, arguing that most women, and female teachers in particular, "are scared of guns," and should not be expected to carry them in classrooms. He is a member of the Phi Kappa Phi fraternity.
