= Bay Minette Municipal Airport =

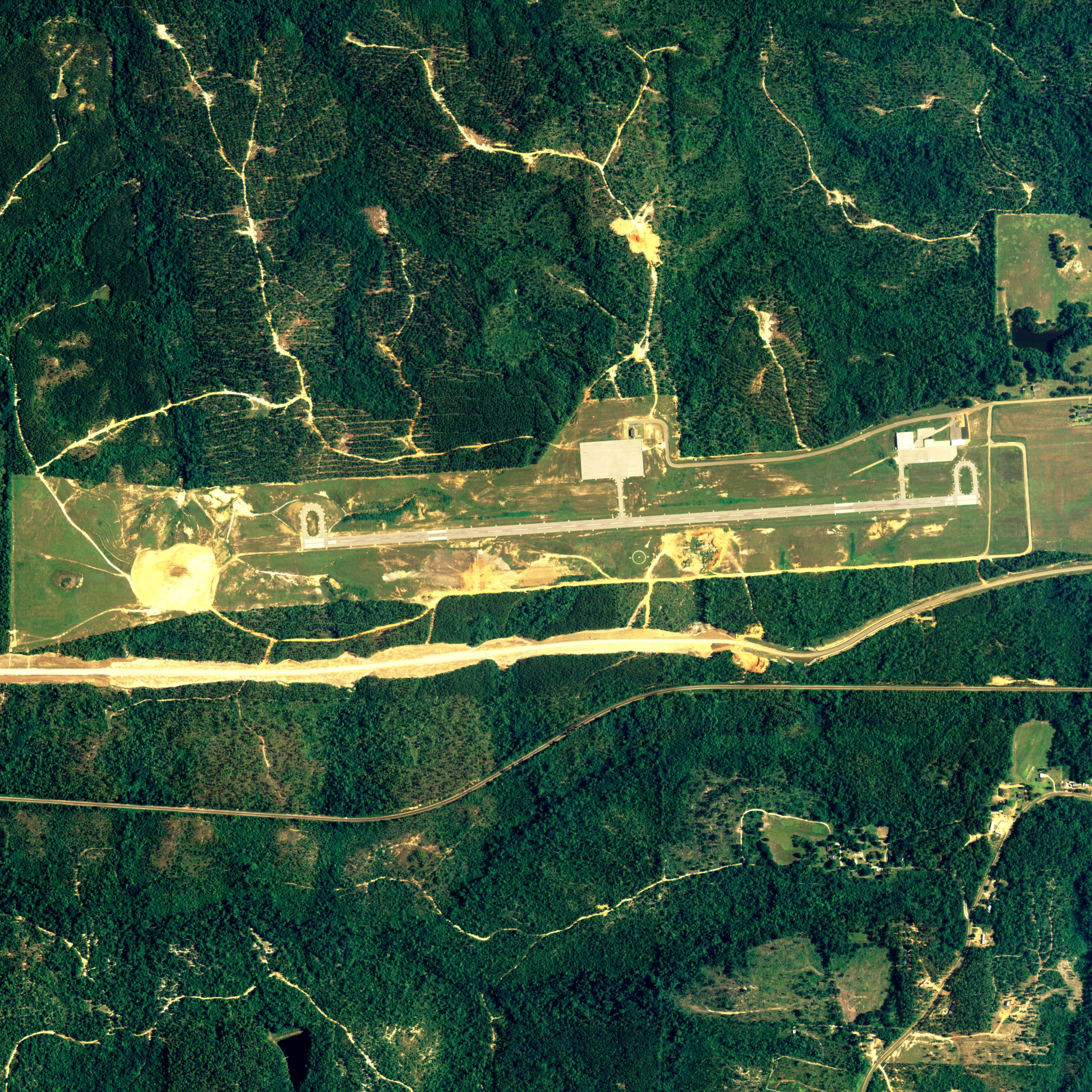
- IATA: none; ICAO: none; FAA LID: 1R8

Summary
- Airport type: Public
- Owner: City of Bay Minette Government
- Serves: Bay Minette, Alabama
- Elevation AMSL: 248 ft (76 m)
- Coordinates: 30°52′13″N 087°49′10″W

Map
- Location of airport in Alabama 1R8 (the United States)

Runways
Direction	Length		Surface
Direction	ft	m	Surface
8/26	5,500	1,676	Asphalt

Statistics (2017)
- Aircraft operations: 175,200
- Based aircraft: 10
- Source: Federal Aviation Administration

Bay Minette Municipal Airport (FAA LID: 1R8) is a city government-owned public-use airport located 3 nautical miles (6 km) southwest of the central business district of Bay Minette, a city in Baldwin County, Alabama, United States.

== Facilities and aircraft ==
Bay Minette Municipal Airport covers an area of 184 acres (0.29 sq mi; 0.74 km^{2}) which contains one runway designated 8/26 is 5,497 x 80 feet (1,675 x 24 meters) asphalt pavement. For the 12-month period ending March 2, 2006, the airport had 8,416 general aviation aircraft operations.

== See also ==
- List of airports in Alabama
