= Blacksher, Alabama =

Unincorporated community in Alabama, United States

Blacksher
- Unincorporated community
- Location within the state of Alabama
- Coordinates: 31°12′39″N 87°44′18″W
- Country: United States
- State: Alabama
- County: Baldwin
- Elevation: 141 ft (43 m)
- Time zone: UTC-6 (Central (CST))
  - Summer (DST): UTC-5 (CDT)
- Area code: 251

Blacksher is an unincorporated community in Baldwin County, Alabama, United States.

== History ==
Blacksher is likely named for Jeptha Blacksher, who served as the first postmaster. A post office operated under the name Blacksher from 1889 to 1950. Jeptha Blacksher was the brother of James Uriah Blacksher, who was the namesake of Uriah, Alabama. Blacksher was once home to six general stores and a naval store. Baldwin County formerly operated a clinic in Blacksher.

The Blacksher Oil Field is named for the community.
