= Perdido Beach, Alabama =

- Town
- Location of Perdido Beach in Baldwin County, Alabama.
- Coordinates: 30°21′08″N 87°30′05″W
- Country: United States
- State: Alabama
- County: Baldwin
- Incorporated: June 10, 2009

Area
  - Total: 1.19 sq mi (3.07 km^{2})
  - Land: 1.19 sq mi (3.07 km^{2})
  - Water: 0 sq mi (0.00 km^{2})
- Elevation: 59 ft (18 m)

Population (2020)
  - Total: 555
  - Density: 468.5/sq mi (180.89/km^{2})
- Time zone: UTC-6 (Central (CST))
  - Summer (DST): UTC-5 (CDT)
- ZIP code: 36530
- Area code: 251
- FIPS code: 01-59088
- GNIS feature ID: 2560543
- Website: www.townofperdidobeach.org

Perdido Beach is a town located on the northern shore of Perdido Bay, between the mouths of Soldier Creek and Palmetto Creek in Baldwin County, Alabama, United States. In an April 2009 plebiscite, over 60% of local voters supported incorporation as a town. On June 10, 2009, Baldwin County Probate Judge Adrian Johns issued an order which incorporated the area as a town. The first municipal elections, in which the mayor and town council will be elected, were scheduled for the fall of 2009. As of the 2020 census, the town had a population of 555.

Perdido Beach is part of the Daphne-Fairhope-Foley metropolitan area.

== Overview ==
There has been tremendous growth in Baldwin County in recent years, particularly southern Baldwin County. Several of the coastal cities have been eyeing the northern shore of Perdido and Wolf Bays for many years, including Perdido Beach. Neighboring Orange Beach has gone so far as to buy property and make plans for a private bridge connecting to a vast amount of undeveloped land on the northern shore. Spurred by the prospect of annexation into Orange Beach, the Perdido Beach Property Owners and Residents Association began laying the groundwork for an incorporation referendum in early 2008. On April 21, 2009, the residents of the community voted to incorporate, becoming Baldwin County's fourteenth municipality.

== Demographics ==
Historical population
Census	Pop.	Note	%±
2010	581		—
2020	555		−4.5%
U.S. Decennial Census

As of the census of 2010, there were 581 people, 273 households, and 189 families residing in the town.

== Education ==
Perdido Beach is a part of the Baldwin County Public Schools system.

== Climate ==
Perdido Beach and Baldwin County are located in the humid subtropical climate zone. High temperatures in the winter average around 65 degrees; summer-time high temperatures average above 90 degrees. Perdido Beach also averages 61 inches of rainfall per year. The temperature however, can dip significantly at times, during the months of December, January, and February, occasionally as low as the lower 40s.

The location of Perdido Beach on the northern coast of the Gulf of Mexico makes it especially vulnerable to hurricanes.
