= Donna Givens =

American politician

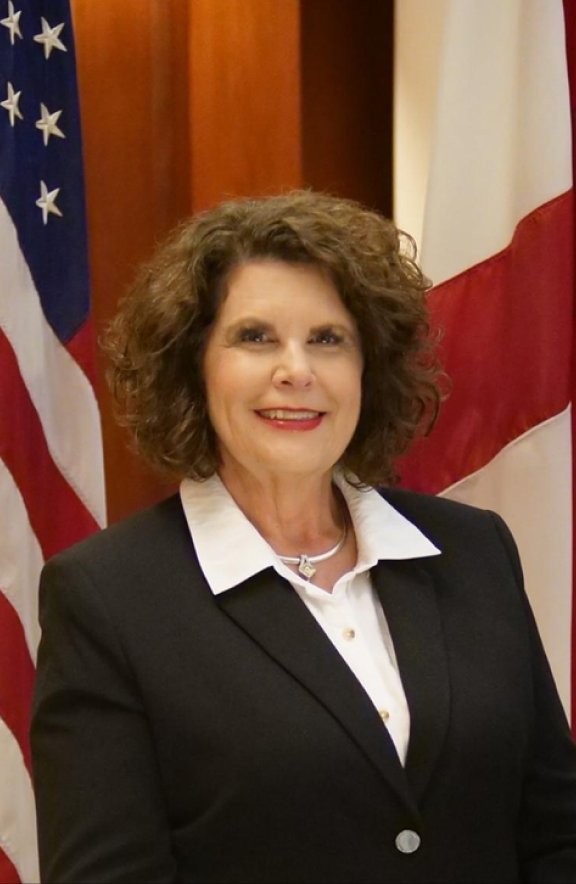

Member of the Alabama House of Representatives from the 64th district
- Incumbent
- Assumed office November 9, 2022
- Preceded by: Harry Shiver

Personal details
- Party: Republican
- Spouse: Alton
- Children: Four, seven grandchildren
- Education: University of Mobile

Donna Givens is an American politician who has served as a Republican member of the Alabama House of Representatives since November 8, 2022. She represents Alabama's 64th House district.

== Electoral history ==
She was elected on November 8, 2022, in the 2022 Alabama House of Representatives election against Libertarian opponent Jeff May. She assumed office the next day on November 9, 2022.

== Biography ==
Givens' father was a trucker. She graduated from Robertsdale High School and University of Mobile.

Alabama House of Representatives
Preceded by Harry Shiver	Member of the Alabama House of Representatives; 2022–present	Succeeded by incumbent
