= Mobile Bay sailing disaster =

2015 maritime disaster in Alabama, US

The Mobile Bay Sailing Disaster was a maritime disaster during the 57th Annual Dauphin Island Yacht Race, in Mobile Bay, Alabama on April 25, 2015. The event resulted in the deaths of six sailors, one of whose body was never recovered, and 8 sunken vessels.
