= Anthony Mix =

American football player (born 1983)

No. 19
- Position: Wide receiver

Personal information
- Born: January 20, 1983 (age 43); Bay Minette, Alabama, U.S.
- Listed height: 6 ft 5 in (1.96 m)
- Listed weight: 240 lb (109 kg)

Career information
- High school: Baldwin County (Bay Minette)
- College: Auburn
- NFL draft: 2006: undrafted

Career history
- New York Giants (2006–2007); Washington Redskins (2007); Tampa Bay Buccaneers (2009); Arizona Rattlers (2010); Columbus Lions (2015)*
- * Offseason or practice squad member only

Career NFL statistics
- Games played: 9
- Receptions: 3
- Receiving yards: 39
- Stats at Pro Football Reference

Career AFL statistics
- Receptions: 19
- Receiving yards: 219
- Receiving touchdowns: 5
- Stats at ArenaFan.com

Anthony Mix (born January 20, 1983) is an American former professional football player who was a wide receiver in the National Football League (NFL). He was signed by the New York Giants as an undrafted free agent in 2006. He played college football for the Auburn Tigers.

Mix was also a member of the Washington Redskins, Tampa Bay Buccaneers, Arizona Rattlers, and Columbus Lions.

== College career ==
Statistics

		Receiving			
Year	Team	Rec	Yards	Avg	TD
2002	Auburn	13	193	14.8	1
2003	Auburn	21	235	11.2	1
2004	Auburn	19	294	13.3	3
2005	Auburn	23	288	12.5	2
Career		76	1,110	13.3	7

Mix, a Bay Minnete native, garnered national recruiting attention after compiling a high school career that saw him excel at wide receiver, quarterback, and defensive end. An all around athlete, he was also a gifted basketball player and track star before deciding to sign with Auburn to play football in the winter of 2001. After red shirting his first season of college, Mix was a thrown right in the middle of the wide receiver rotation in 2002. Mix enjoyed solid success in his debut year. He out-leapt a pair of defenders for a 16-yard score versus Mississippi State and had a career long 46-yard reception in the 17–7 upset victory over Alabama.

2003 saw Mix make the transition to tight end, starting the season on the second-team. He played his best game to date in the 31–7 loss to LSU, by catching 5 passes for 47 yards and a touchdown. He finished 4th on the team in all major statistical receiving categories.

Mix was a major contributor to the undefeated SEC champion team on 04' by being the 5th-leading receiver for an offense that averaged 32.1 points per game. Playing primarily tight end, he started 4 games and saw playing time in 9 others. He had a career best 2 TD in the 43-14 drubbing of Mississippi State, scoring from 5 and 58 yards out. He tied his career high with 76 yards against Arkansas and was named Coaches' Special Team Player of the Week against the Citadel. He caught a 29-yard touchdown pass from Carnell Williams in the decisive victory over Georgia and had a huge 53-yard gain in the Sugar Bowl versus Virginia Tech. His 294 yards on the season were a career best.

2005 saw Mix make the transition back to wide out, where he became the team's 3rd most prolific receiver. He had multiple catches in 8 games and had one of the finer performances of his career in the heartbreaking road loss to LSU. Against the Bengals, he caught 5 passes for 69 yards and the go-ahead score with 4 minutes left in the 4th quarter. He had a 35-yard reception against Georgia that set up an Auburn score and caught a 19-yard pass over the middle that lead to a touchdown in the Iron Bowl. An 11-yard catch in the bowl game versus Wisconsin put Mix at over 1000 receiving yards for his Auburn career.

== Professional career ==
=== New York Giants ===
Mix was signed by the New York Giants as an undrafted free agent following the 2006 NFL draft, in which two fellow Auburn receivers (Devin Aromashodu and Ben Obomanu) were drafted. Mix spent the entire 2006 season on the Giants practice squad, but after an impressive training camp and preseason he managed to crack into the team's active roster to start the 2007 season. He played each of the first four games, recording three catches for 39 yards in one game, but was waived on October 3, 2007, to make room on the roster for return specialist Domenik Hixon (who was claimed off waivers from the Denver Broncos).

=== Washington Redskins ===
On November 20, 2007, Mix was signed by the Washington Redskins off the Giants practice squad, reuniting him with Jason Campbell - his quarterback at Auburn. On January 5, 2008, Mix recovered a muffed kickoff during a wild card playoff game against the Seattle Seahawks.

Mix broke a rib in the team's second preseason game in 2008. He was released by the team during final cuts on August 30 and spent the season out of football.

=== Tampa Bay Buccaneers ===
Mix signed with the Tampa Bay Buccaneers on January 24, 2009. He was released on May 6, 2009.
