= Perdido, Alabama =

- Census-designated place
- Location of Perdido in Baldwin County, Alabama.
- Coordinates: 31°00′28″N 87°37′38″W
- Country: United States
- State: Alabama
- County: Baldwin

Area
  - Total: 11.17 sq mi (28.92 km^{2})
  - Land: 11.14 sq mi (28.85 km^{2})
  - Water: 0.031 sq mi (0.08 km^{2})
- Elevation: 220 ft (67 m)

Population (2020)
  - Total: 730
  - Density: 65.6/sq mi (25.31/km^{2})
- Time zone: UTC-6 (Central (CST))
  - Summer (DST): UTC-5 (CDT)
- ZIP code: 36562
- Area code: 251
- GNIS feature ID: 2633316

Perdido, also known as Perdido Station, is an unincorporated community and census-designated place in Baldwin County, Alabama, United States. As of the 2020 census, Perdido had a population of 730. Perdido is located along County Route 61, 12.2 miles (19.6 km) northeast of Bay Minette. Perdido has a post office with ZIP code 36562. It has an elementary school, Perdido School, which is part of the Baldwin County Board of Education.

== Demographics ==
Historical population
Census	Pop.	Note	%±
2020	730		—
U.S. Decennial Census

Perdido CDP, Alabama – Racial and ethnic composition Note: the US Census treats Hispanic/Latino as an ethnic category. This table excludes Latinos from the racial categories and assigns them to a separate category. Hispanics/Latinos may be of any race.
Race / Ethnicity (NH = Non-Hispanic)	Pop 2020	2020
White alone (NH)	591	80.96%
Black or African American alone (NH)	50	6.85%
Native American or Alaska Native alone (NH)	21	2.88%
Asian alone (NH)	0	0.00%
Native Hawaiian or Pacific Islander alone (NH)	0	0.00%
Other race alone (NH)	1	0.14%
Mixed race or Multiracial (NH)	43	5.89%
Hispanic or Latino (any race)	24	3.29%
Total	730	100.00%

The community had a population of 730 as of the 2020 census.

== History ==
Perdido is named after the Perdido River. A post office operated under the name Perdido Station from 1871 to 1923, and under the name Perdido from 1923 to present.

== Cultural references ==
Perdido is the setting of author and screenwriter Michael McDowell's Blackwater Series, first published in 1983. It takes place in Perdido, but in an alternative universe where the town grows into a thriving town between the 1920s and the 1970s.

=== Education ===
The school district is Baldwin County Public Schools.
