= Fish River (Alabama) =

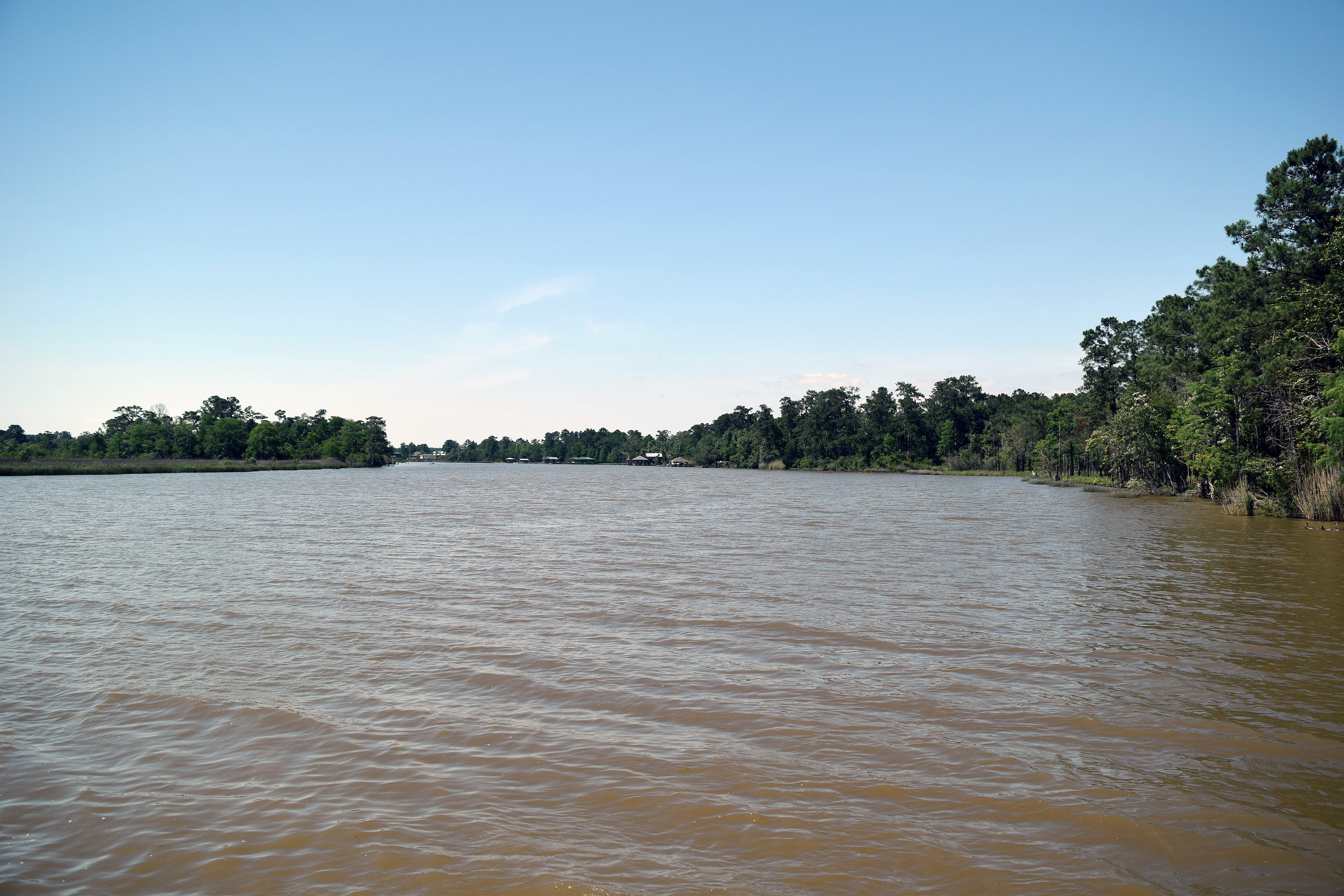
- Fish River near Weeks Bay, looking north

Location
- Country: United States
- State: Alabama
- County: Baldwin County

Physical characteristics
- Source
  - coordinates: 30.74102°N 87.79888°W
- Mouth
  - coordinates: 30.41353°N 87.82526°W

Fish River is a 28.9-mile-long (46.5 km) river in Baldwin County, Alabama. It originates at 30.74102°N 87.79888°W, near Stapleton, and discharges into Weeks Bay at 30.41353°N 87.82526°W in Magnolia Springs. It was named by the original French colonists as the Riviere Aux Poissons, which can be translated into English as Fish River. The river runs through mostly rural areas but is traversed by US Highway 31, Interstate 10 and US Highway 90.

The Wiese Family Nature Preserve, owned by the Weeks Bay Foundation, extends along the northernmost portion of the river and protects the habitat along the entire river. Among the wildlife seen along Fish River are bald eagles. The eagles were wiped out in Alabama but have made a comeback including nests along the river. Some areas around the river are also noted as roosting areas for vultures. A pitcher plant bog borders Fish River and boasts 91 species of plants. Both fresh and saltwater species of fish are found in the river. Freshwater species are found in the upper parts of the river while saltwater fish, namely flounder, redfish and speckled trout, are found closer to Weeks Bay. Occasionally grass shrimp are found in the river which is considered excellent bait for fishing.

Fish River is part of the tidal system associated with Mobile Bay. Tidal fluctuations vary between 1 and 1.5 feet.
