= Stapleton, Alabama =

- Unincorporated community
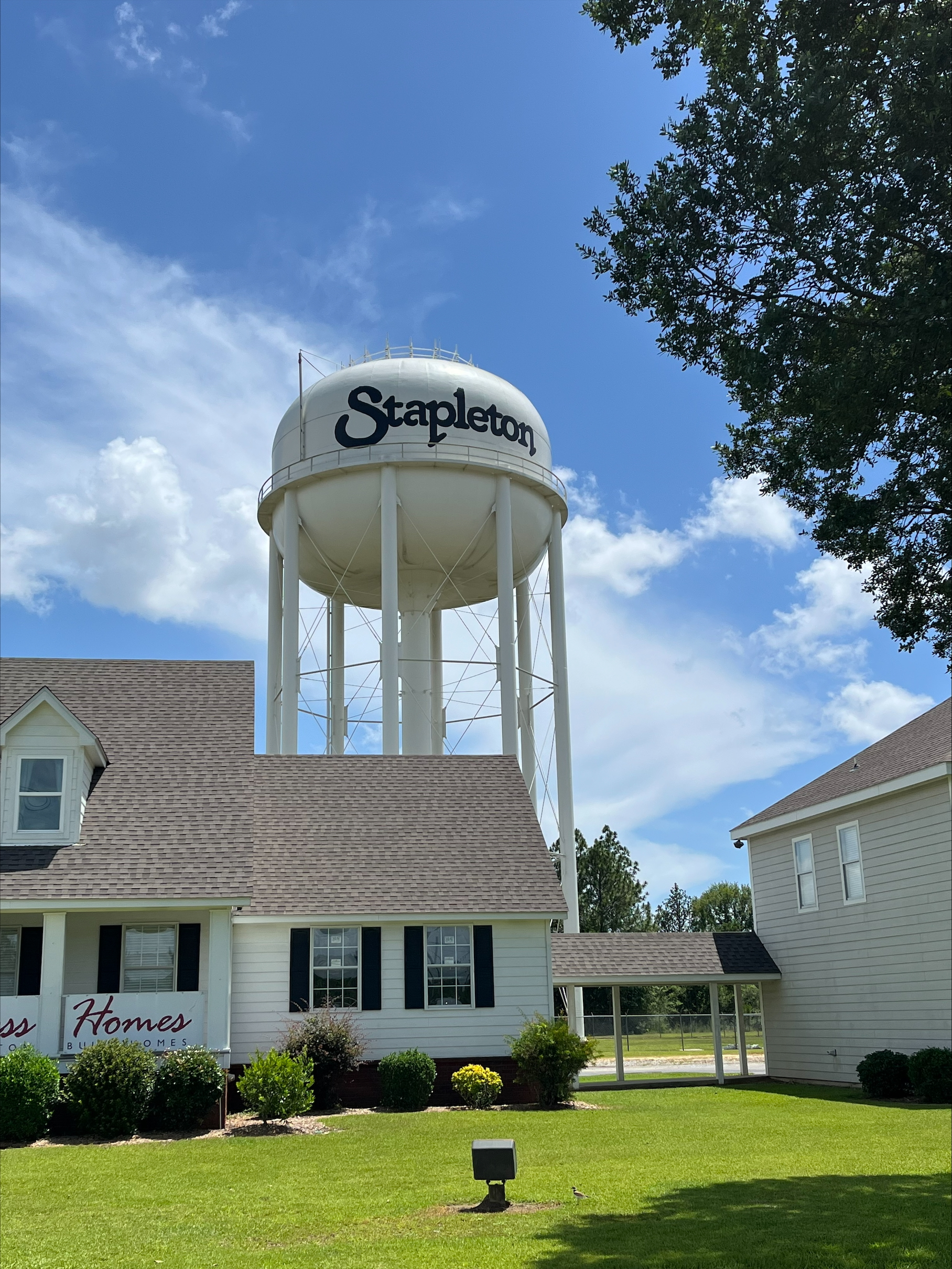
- Stapleton Water Tower

- Location of Stapleton in Baldwin County, Alabama.
- Coordinates: 30°44′48″N 87°47′39″W
- Country: United States
- State: Alabama
- County: Baldwin

Area
  - Total: 10.92 sq mi (28.29 km^{2})
  - Land: 10.92 sq mi (28.27 km^{2})
  - Water: 0.0077 sq mi (0.02 km^{2})
- Elevation: 223 ft (68 m)

Population (2020)
  - Total: 2,213
  - Density: 202.8/sq mi (78.29/km^{2})
- Time zone: UTC-6 (Central (CST))
  - Summer (DST): UTC-5 (CDT)
- ZIP code: 36578
- Area code: 251
- FIPS code: 01-72816
- GNIS feature ID: 2633317

Stapleton is an unincorporated community in northern Baldwin County, Alabama, United States. As of the 2020 census, Stapleton had a population of 2,213. It is part of the Daphne-Fairhope-Foley metropolitan area. Stapleton lies along U.S. Route 31 and State Route 59. There is a bluegrass music festival held at Stapleton Elementary School every fall. There are about 250 students at the school that runs from Pre-K to the 6th grade.

== History ==
The first post office in the town of Canby, as Stapleton was then known, was established in 1895. Later, the Hamm brothers of Chicago, IL convinced the Louisville and Nashville Railroad (L&N) to build a subsidiary line between Bay Minette and Foley. By 1905 this spur called the Bay Minette & Fort Morgan Railroad had penetrated the thirty-seven miles of dense Baldwin County pine forests with the town of Canby lying along the route. Shortly afterwards the town's name was changed to honor W. D. Stapleton, the man who was instrumental in getting a railroad depot for their town. The railroad was important to the local economy and early on the trains passed through Stapleton several times a day as they made their way to the southern end of the county and back. Highway traffic also picked up as of 1936 when the only paved road in Baldwin County, other than a small strip in Bay Minette going from the courthouse to the railroad, was the stretch of US 31 coming in from Atmore and ending at Stapleton. By the 1970s the train traffic had slowed to at most one train making the down and back trip each day. Now the train tracks are completely gone.

== Demographics ==
Historical population
Census	Pop.	Note	%±
2020	2,213		—
U.S. Decennial Census

=== 2020 census ===
As of the 2020 census, Stapleton had a population of 2,213. The median age was 41.2 years. 24.5% of residents were under the age of 18 and 18.4% of residents were 65 years of age or older. For every 100 females there were 94.5 males, and for every 100 females age 18 and over there were 95.3 males age 18 and over.

0.0% of residents lived in urban areas, while 100.0% lived in rural areas.

There were 829 households in Stapleton, of which 38.1% had children under the age of 18 living in them. Of all households, 57.7% were married-couple households, 14.6% were households with a male householder and no spouse or partner present, and 20.6% were households with a female householder and no spouse or partner present. About 22.0% of all households were made up of individuals and 11.2% had someone living alone who was 65 years of age or older.

There were 885 housing units, of which 6.3% were vacant. The homeowner vacancy rate was 0.6% and the rental vacancy rate was 14.4%.

Stapleton CDP, Alabama – Racial and ethnic composition Note: the US Census treats Hispanic/Latino as an ethnic category. This table excludes Latinos from the racial categories and assigns them to a separate category. Hispanics/Latinos may be of any race.
Race / Ethnicity (NH = Non-Hispanic)	Pop 2020	2020
White alone (NH)	1,934	87.39%
Black or African American alone (NH)	43	1.94%
Native American or Alaska Native alone (NH)	20	0.90%
Asian alone (NH)	14	0.63%
Native Hawaiian or Pacific Islander alone (NH)	0	0.00%
Other race alone (NH)	12	0.54%
Mixed race or Multiracial (NH)	121	5.47%
Hispanic or Latino (any race)	69	3.12%
Total	2,213	100.00%

== Education ==
Stapleton is zoned to schools in the Baldwin County Public Schools. Stapleton Elementary School serves Pre-K through 6th grade. Grades 7 through 8 attend Bay Minette Middle School. Grades 9 through 12 are zoned to Baldwin County High School. The students can participate in band starting in sixth grade, but are also exposed to many other opportunities at their after school program.
