= Baldwin County Board of Education =

School district in Alabama

Coordinates: 30°53′29.03″N 87°47′7.74″W

Location
- Bay Minette, Alabama United States

District information
- Type: Public
- Motto: Building Excellence
- Grades: K-12
- Superintendent: Eddie Tyler
- Accreditation: Southern Association of Colleges and Schools
- Budget: $201,000,000 (2007)

Students and staff
- Students: 24,869
- Teachers: 1,913
- Staff: 3,400
- Student–teacher ratio: 13:1

Other information
- Website: bcbe.org

The Baldwin County Board of Education oversees most public schools in Baldwin County, Alabama, and is based in Bay Minette, Alabama. The Board serves the entire county. Over 30,000 students are within the supervision of the Board. 3,400 employees including 2,100 classroom teachers, serve the students at its campuses. The Board of Education is the largest single employer in Baldwin County.

== History ==
In 2017, Gulf Shores approved a plan create a separate school district and began breaking away from Baldwin County School System. The city of Gulf Shores broke away from the Baldwin County Public Schools system at the beginning of the 2019-2020 school year. The Gulf Shores City Schools operate three schools, one elementary, one middle, and one high school.

On March 15, 2022, Orange Beach voted on a plan to create its own city school district (Orange Beach City Schools), breaking away from Baldwin County School System.

== Student body ==
Over ninety percent of the student body speaks English only. Spanish is the language most common language after English. Languages other than English represented in Baldwin County Schools are Arabic, Armenian, Bengali, Cambodian, Chinese, Finnish, French, German, Gujarati, Japanese, Korean, Marathi, Nepali, Norwegian, Polish, Portuguese, Romanian, Russian, Spanish, Tagalog, Tamil, Telugu, Thai, Turkish, Ukrainian, Udu, Vietnamese, and other indigenous languages.

About thirteen percent of the student body lives in poverty. This is slightly less than the state and national averages. The student body is about 83% White and 9%, in line with the county population.

== Board composition ==
The board is composed of seven members elected within districts throughout the county. The Superintendent of Education is appointed by the board and is not a member of it.

=== Board members ===
- David Cox, District 1
- David Tarwater, District 2
- Tony Myrick, District 3
- Norman Moore, District 4, Board President
- Robert Stuart, District 5,
- Cecil Christenberry, District 6,
- Shannon Cauley, District 7, Board Vice President

=== Superintendent ===
The Baldwin County Superintendent of Education is Marty McRae who has been with the school system in various positions for several years. The previous superintendent of the school district was Eddie Tyler. Tyler served as a teacher and athletics coach before retiring to his current position. Robbie Owen of Rockwell Elementary in Spanish Fort, AL was temporarily appointed after the mid-year departure of Dr. Alan T. Lee due to misconduct.

=== Assistant Superintendents ===
- Joe Sharp — Assistant Superintendent, Secondary Education
- Dr. Shannon McCurdy — Assistant Superintendent, Elementary Education
- Eric West — Assistant Superintendent, Human Resources
- Frank Boatwright, Jr. — Assistant Superintendent, Construction & Development
- Dr. David Besancon — Assistant Superintendent, Educational Technology

== Finances ==
The 2013-2014 budget is $305 million. Economic difficulties confronted the Board beginning in 2008 when local and state tax revenue tanked and were exacerbated by the Deepwater Horizon oil spill. Citizens voted twice to approve an emergency one percent sales tax that has kept the system running. Among the innovations is the Digital Renaissance, an initiative that has put Mac Book laptops in the hands of more than 10,000 high school students and 700 high school teachers. Despite tight budgets the school voted to include $2.8 million in the 2014 budget to expand the program to grades 4 - 6.

Baldwin County is one of the fastest growing school systems in Alabama but is ranked 110 out of 134 systems in total funding per student. The system has averaged a growth rate of 2% per year and could soon become the second largest system in the state. Compared to 2012 one elementary school experienced a 10% increase in students.

In 2015, the Board asked voters to approve an additional 8 mills in ad valorem taxes. Officials were criticized for spending in excess of $150,000 to promote passage of the new taxes. The Alabama State Auditor asked the state Attorney General to convene a Grand Jury to examine the expenditures. In April 2015 voters refused to approve the new taxes and defunded $14 million in taxes which were due for renewal.

== High School Academic Rankings ==
Out of 378 statewide high schools, the Baldwin County high schools received the following rankings for the 2023-2024 school year:

- Fairhope HS - 5th
- Spanish Fort HS - 10th
- Daphne HS - 20th
- Baldwin County Virtual School - 35th
- Elberta HS - 39th
- Robertsdale HS - 49th
- Baldwin County HS - 61st
- Foley HS - 91st

== School policies ==
In May 2011, the board abolished corporal punishment, and this change has been in effect since the 2011-2012 school year.

Every student, including kindergarteners, receive some kind of computer or digital device for use in the classroom. The school board is part of the League of Innovative Schools/Digital Promise initiative and terms its local program as the Digital Renaissance. The program began in 2013 with an initial payment of over $15 million paid to Apple. A $9.6 million loan supported the expansion of the program to all students in the 2014-2015 school year. Parents pay $64 per student annually for damage insurance. Since the 2016-2017 school year, the board has used Google Chromebook devices as a cheaper alternative and replacement to Apple's devices.

== Schools ==
=== Secondary schools ===
==== High schools ====
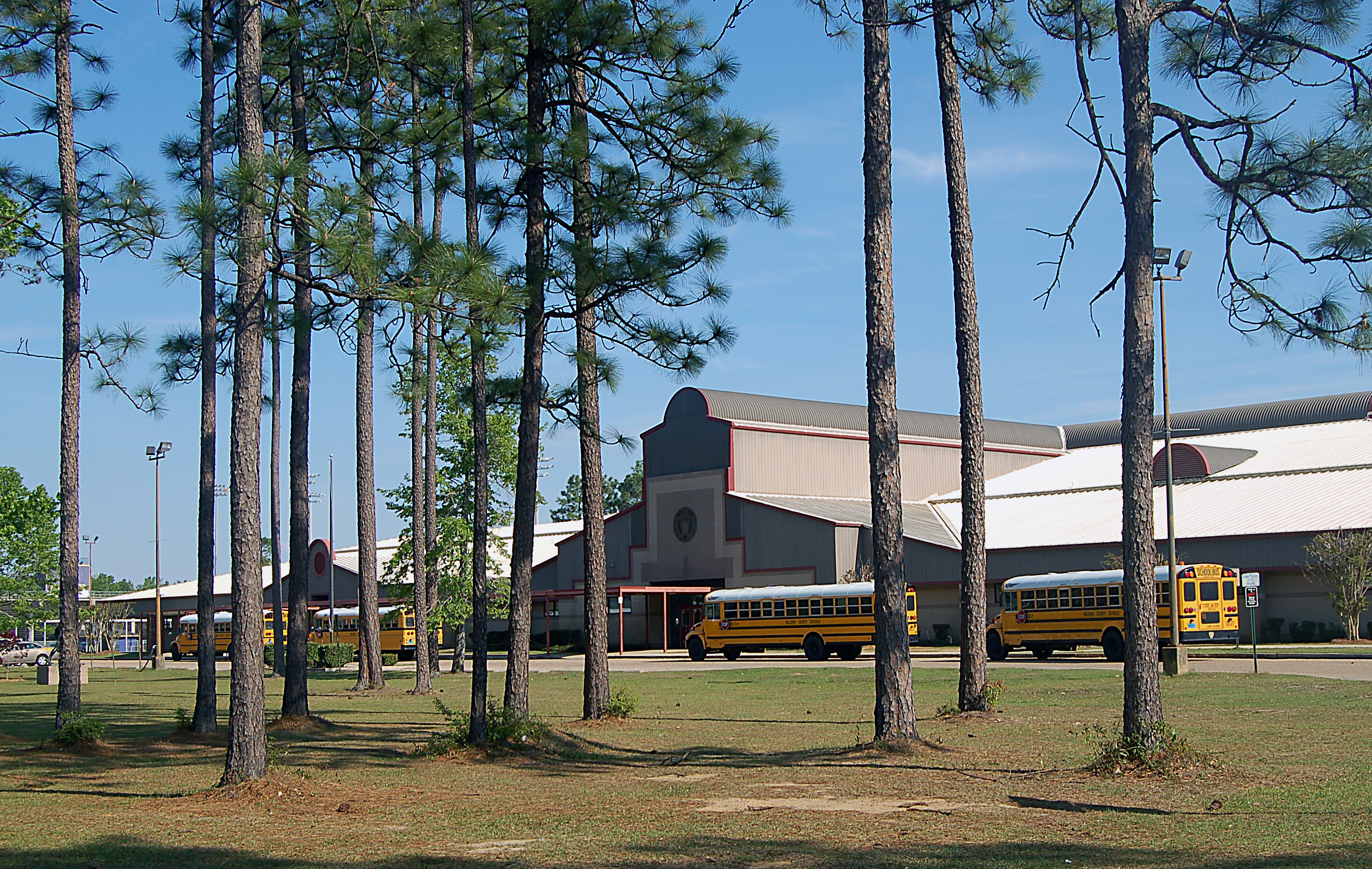
Daphne High School

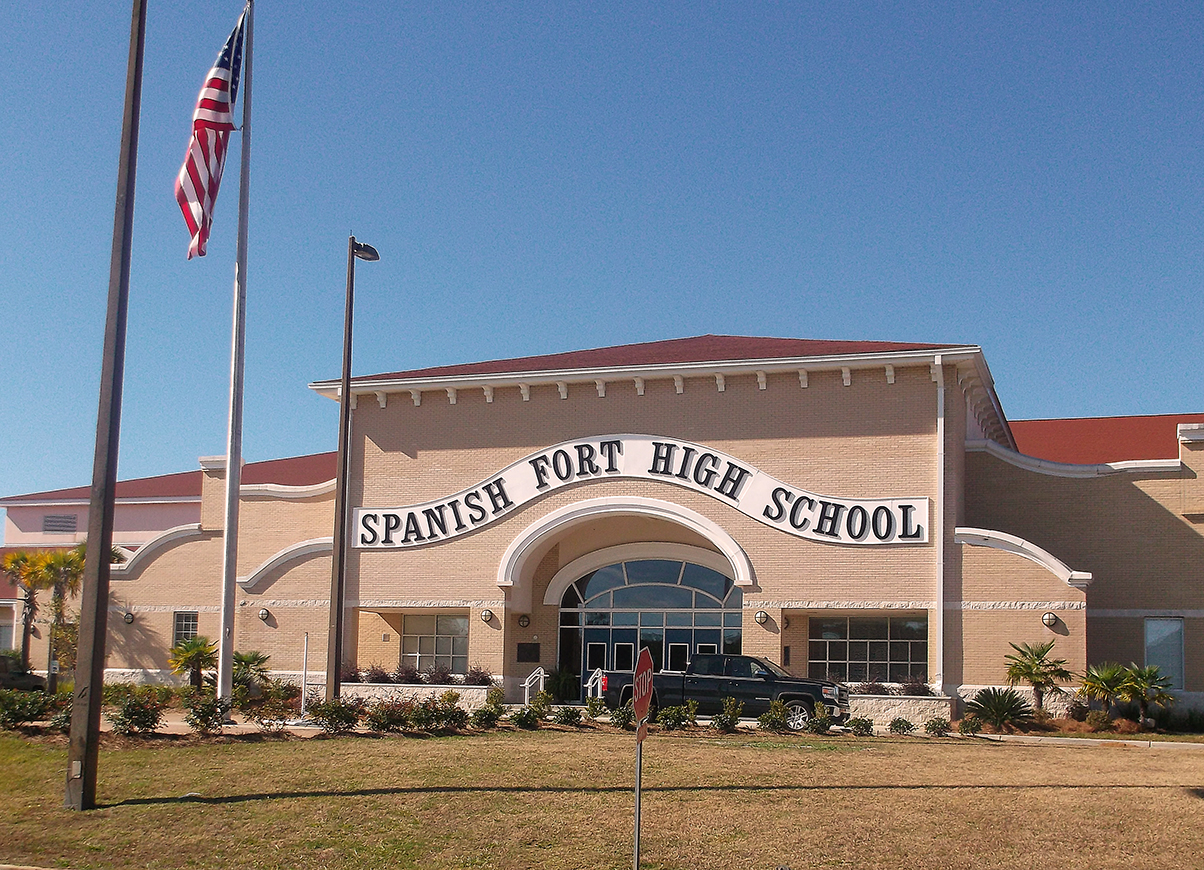
Spanish Fort High School

- Baldwin County High School (Bay Minette)
- Baldwin Preparatory Academy
- Daphne High School (Daphne)
- Elberta High School (Elberta)
- Fairhope High School (Fairhope)
- Foley High School (Foley)
- North Baldwin Center for Technology (Bay Minette) (11th & 12th only)
- Robertsdale High School (Robertsdale)
- South Baldwin Center for Technology (Robertsdale) (11th & 12th only)
- Spanish Fort High School (Spanish Fort)

==== Middle schools ====
- Bay Minette Middle School (Bay Minette)
- Central Baldwin Middle School (Loxley)
- Daphne Middle School (Daphne)
- Elberta Middle School (Elberta)
- Fairhope Middle School (Fairhope)
- Foley Middle School (Foley)
- Spanish Fort Middle School (Spanish Fort)

=== Elementary schools ===
- Bay Minette Elementary School (Bay Minette) (K-6th)
- Daphne Elementary School East Campus (Daphne)(K-6th)
- Daphne Elementary School North Campus (Daphne) (K-3rd)
- Daphne Elementary School South Campus (Daphne) (4th - 6th)
- Delta Elementary School (Whitehouse Fork)(K-6th)
- Elberta Elementary School (Elberta) (K-3rd)
- Elsanor Elementary School (Elsanor)(K-6th)
- Fairhope Elementary School (Fairhope) (K-6th)
- Florence B. Mathis Elementary School (Foley) (K-6th)
- Foley Elementary School (Foley)(K-5th)
- J.L. Newton Elementary School (near Fairhope)(K-8th)
- Loxley Elementary School (Loxley)(K-6th)
- Magnolia School (Magnolia Springs)(K-6th)
- Perdido Elementary School (near Perdido)) (K-8th)
- Pine Grove Elementary School (Pine Grove) (K-6th)
- Robertsdale Elementary School (Robertsdale)(K-6th)
- Rockwell Elementary School [Spanish Fort](K-5th)
- Rosinton Elementary School (Robertsdale)(K-6th)
- Silverhill Elementary School (unincorporated Baldwin, near Silverhill)(K-6th)
- Spanish Fort Elementary/Middle School (Spanish Fort)(K-6th)
- Stapleton School (Stapleton)(K-6th)
- Stonebridge Elementary School ( Spanish Fort)(K-6th)
- Summerdale Elementary School (Summerdale)(K-8th)
- Swift Consolidated Elementary School (unincorporated Baldwin (Bon Secour))(K-5th)
- WJ Carroll Intermediate School (Daphne, Alabama) (4th-6th)

== Former schools ==
Now in Gulf Shores City Schools:

- Gulf Shores High School
- Gulf Shores Middle School
- Gulf Shores Elementary School
- Orange Beach Middle & High School
- Orange Beach Elementary School
