= Robertsdale High School =

Public high school in Robertsdale, Alabama, United States

Location
- 1 Golden Bear Drive; Robertsdale, Alabama 36567; United States; 30°32′26″N 87°42′22″W

Information
- School type: Public high school
- School district: Baldwin County Public Schools
- CEEB code: 012325
- Principal: William (Shay) White
- Teaching staff: 88.00 (on an FTE basis)
- Grades: 9-12
- Enrollment: 1,509 (2023-2024)
- Student to teacher ratio: 17.15
- Colors: Maroon and gold
- Mascot: Bears
- Website: www.robertsdalehigh.com

Robertsdale High School is a high school located in Robertsdale, Alabama and it is a part of the Baldwin County Public Schools System. The current principal is Mr. William (Shay) White

== Controversies ==
During a school football pep rally for the Robertsdale Golden Bears to go against the Spanish Fort Toros, students were seen holding Trump flags and a sign that read "Put the panic back in Hispanic."

== Alumni ==
- Joe Childress - former NFL running back for the Chicago/St. Louis Cardinals
- Donna Givens - American politician from Alabama
- Dave Stapleton - former MLB player who played for the Boston Red Sox from 1980 to 1986
- Obie Trotter - professional basketball player for Szolnoki Olaj KK in the Hungarian Basketball National Championship
- Tim Cook - the CEO of Apple Inc since 2011

== Sports ==
Robertsdale high school hosts baseball, basketball, golf, swimming, tennis, soccer, track and field, volleyball, football, cricket, and wrestling.
