= Mobile Bay =

Inlet of the Gulf of Mexico, lying within the state of Alabama in the United States

Coordinates: 30°26′34″N 88°00′33″W

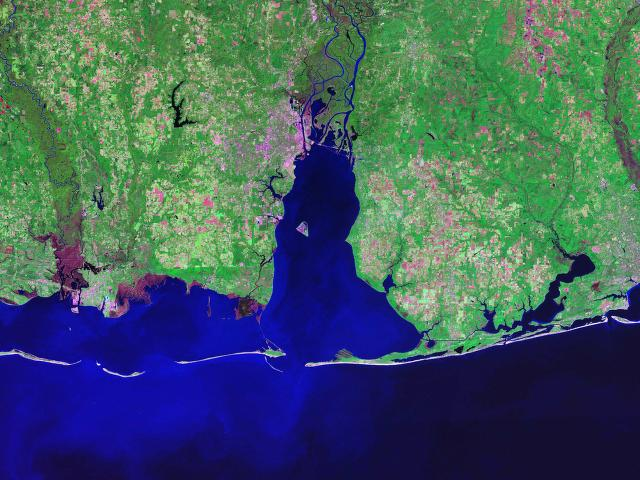
Landsat program photo with Mobile Bay in the center

Mobile Bay (/moʊˈbiːl/ moh-BEEL; French: baie de Mobile) is a shallow inlet of the Gulf of Mexico, lying within the state of Alabama in the United States. Its mouth is formed by the Fort Morgan Peninsula on the eastern side and Dauphin Island, a barrier island, on the western side. The Mobile River and Tensaw River empty into the northern end of the bay, making it an estuary. Several smaller rivers also empty into the bay: Dog River, Deer River, and Fowl River on the western side of the bay, and Fish River on the eastern side. Mobile Bay is the fourth-largest estuary in the United States, with a discharge of 62,000 cubic feet (1,800 m^{3}) of water per second. Annually, and often several times during the summer months, the fish and crustaceans will swarm the shallow coastline and shore of the bay. This event, appropriately named a jubilee, draws a large crowd because of the abundance of fresh, easily caught seafood.

Mobile Bay is 413 square miles (1,070 km^{2}) in area. It is 31 miles (50 km) long by a maximum width of 24 miles (39 km). The deepest areas of the bay are located within the shipping channel, sometimes in excess of 75 feet (23 m) deep, but the average depth of the bay is 10 feet (3 m).

== History ==
Long occupied by cultures of indigenous peoples, this area was still under the chiefs of Mississippian culture at the time of Hernando de Soto's exploration.

The recorded history of Mobile Bay begins about 1500, when Spanish explorers were sailing into the area. On early maps, the bay was named as Bahía del Espíritu Santo (Bay of the Holy Spirit). The area was explored in more detail in 1516 by Diego Miruelo and in 1519 by Alonso Álvarez de Pineda. In 1528, Pánfilo de Narváez travelled through what was likely the Mobile Bay area, encountering Native Americans who fled and burned their towns at the approach of the expedition. This response was a prelude to the journeys of Hernando de Soto, more than eleven years later.

=== European exploration into the region ===
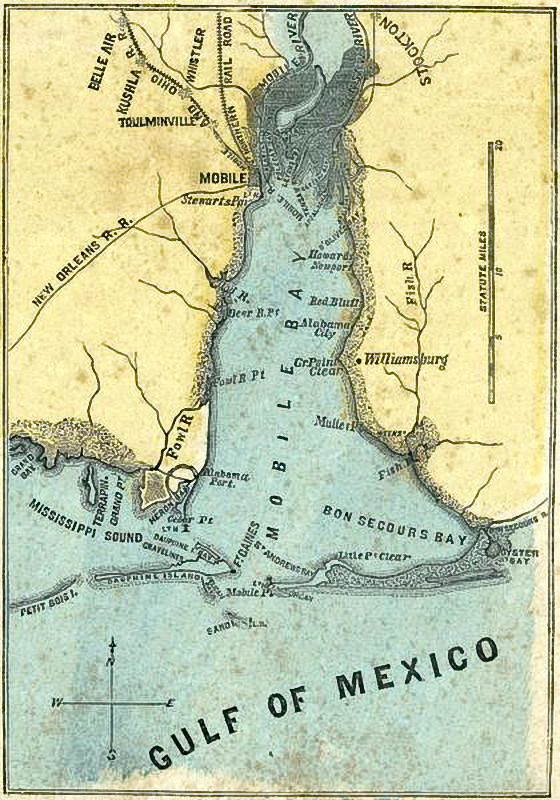
Mobile Bay during the American Civil War.

Hernando de Soto explored the area of Mobile Bay and beyond in 1540, finding the area inhabited by indigenous Mississippian culture people. During this expedition his forces destroyed the fortified town of Mauvila, also spelled Maubila, from which the name Mobile was later derived. It was a town of the paramount Chief Tuscaloosa, located in inland Alabama, well to the north of the current site of Mobile. The next large expedition was that of Tristán de Luna y Arellano, in his unsuccessful attempt to establish a permanent colony for Spain nearby at Pensacola in 1559.

Although Spain's presence in the area had been sporadic, in 1702 French colonists created a deep-sea port at Dauphin Island and founded French Louisiana's capital at Mobile, a few miles north of Mobile Bay on the Mobile River. Following a series of floods, the original settlement of Fort Louis de la Mobile was relocated in 1711 to the head of Mobile Bay.

=== Role in wars ===
During the American Civil War Mobile Bay was used as a major port for blockade runners bringing in badly needed supplies for the Confederacy. On August 5, 1864, Admiral David Farragut led a Union flotilla through Confederate defenses and sealed off one of the last major Southern ports of the bay in the Battle of Mobile Bay. A number of Civil War-era shipwrecks remain in Mobile Bay, including American Diver, CSS Gaines, CSS Huntsville, USS Philippi, CSS Phoenix, USS Rodolph, USS Tecumseh, and CSS Tuscaloosa.

Mobile's role as a seaport has continued to the present day, though the commodities have changed through time. Cotton was the chief commodity in the nineteenth century. During the Second World War, Mobile's shipbuilding industry expanded, and the city's population surged as both black and white migrants moved there for work. Growth has been rapid since then.

=== Natural disasters in the area ===
The city has endured several devastating hurricanes in its history, the most recent being Hurricane Frederic in 1979 and Hurricane Katrina in 2005. Areas of low elevation, including the downtown business district, have been flooded repeatedly in hurricanes. However, much of the city is at an elevation exceeding 200 feet (61 m) above sea level, which is unusually high for the Gulf and Atlantic coasts.

On September 13, 1979, Hurricane Frederic entered the bay with winds reaching 145 miles per hour (233 km/h), destroying the bridge to Dauphin Island. On August 28–29, 2005, Hurricane Katrina pushed a massive storm surge into Mobile Bay; it measured 16 feet (4.9 m) high at Bayou La Batre (Alabama), with higher waves on top, and 12 feet (3.7 m) high at Mobile, at the far northern end of the 31-mile-long Mobile Bay. Thousands of boats, piers, and beach houses were damaged by waves exceeding 22 feet (6.7 m) high, and the battleship USS Alabama was pushed off her moorings, leaving her listing to port (tilted to the left). Downtown Mobile was flooded several feet, and the south-end towns of Bayou La Batre and Bon Secour were severely damaged. Dozens of vessels of various sizes were left stranded inland.

== Shoreline towns ==
The city of Mobile is situated at the head of the bay on the western shore. On the Eastern Shore of the bay are found several small communities, including Spanish Fort, Daphne, Fairhope, Point Clear, and Bon Secour. The town of Gulf Shores lies just outside the bay, on the Fort Morgan peninsula, while the town of Fort Morgan is located directly south of the bay. The Middle Bay Lighthouse has been located in the center of the bay since 1885.

The head of the bay is crossed by two major thoroughfares, Interstate 10, known as the Jubilee Parkway, and US 90/US 98, known as the Battleship Parkway. These two bridges serve as the primary connections between the city of Mobile and the Eastern Shore. On warm summer nights, the residents living around Mobile Bay sometimes enjoy the fruits of a mysterious natural phenomenon called a Jubilee, when fish and crabs swarm toward shore and can be easily harvested by people wading in the shallows.

== See also ==
- Gulf Islands National Seashore - offshore islands, includes nearby states.
- Gaillard Island
- Mobile Bay sailing disaster
- Mobile-Tensaw River Delta
