= Fort Morgan, Alabama =

Unincorporated community in Alabama, United States

Fort Morgan
- Unincorporated community
- Location within the state of Alabama Fort Morgan (the United States)
- Coordinates: 30°13′43″N 88°01′23″W
- Country: United States
- State: Alabama
- County: Baldwin
- Elevation: 10 ft (3.0 m)
- Time zone: UTC-6 (Central (CST))
  - Summer (DST): UTC-5 (CDT)
- GNIS feature ID: 156368

Fort Morgan, also known as Fort Bowyer, is an unincorporated community in Baldwin County, Alabama, United States. It is west of Gulf Shores on Mobile Point. Mobile Point extends from Gulf Shores to the west, towards historic Fort Morgan at the tip of the peninsula.

== History ==
The population in 1880 was 38.

A post office operated under the name Fort Morgan from 1892 to 1924.

Some Fort Morgan residents have sought to incorporate their community, and have pursued litigation against Gulf Shores. In 2016, a bill to incorporate Fort Morgan was not considered by the Alabama legislature. The Fort Morgan Civic Association has stated that incorporation would enable the community to protect itself from waterfront development, after Alabama made a "$1.8 million investment in renovating the state's rundown beach house there".

== Geography ==
The community is part of the Daphne–Fairhope–Foley Micropolitan Statistical Area. Unofficially, along with Orange Beach and Gulf Shores, the community is considered to be a part of the Emerald Coast region that the western panhandle of Florida is located on. Additionally, Fort Morgan is located across Mobile Bay from Dauphin Island.
