= Bon Secour Bay =

Bay in Baldwin County, Alabama

Coordinates: 30°18′N 87°50′W

Bon Secour Bay is a bay located in Baldwin County, Alabama, United States. The name "Bon Secour" derives from the French phrase meaning "safe harbor" due to the secluded location on the inside coast of the Fort Morgan peninsula of southern Alabama.
