= Robertsdale, Alabama =

City in Alabama, United States

- City
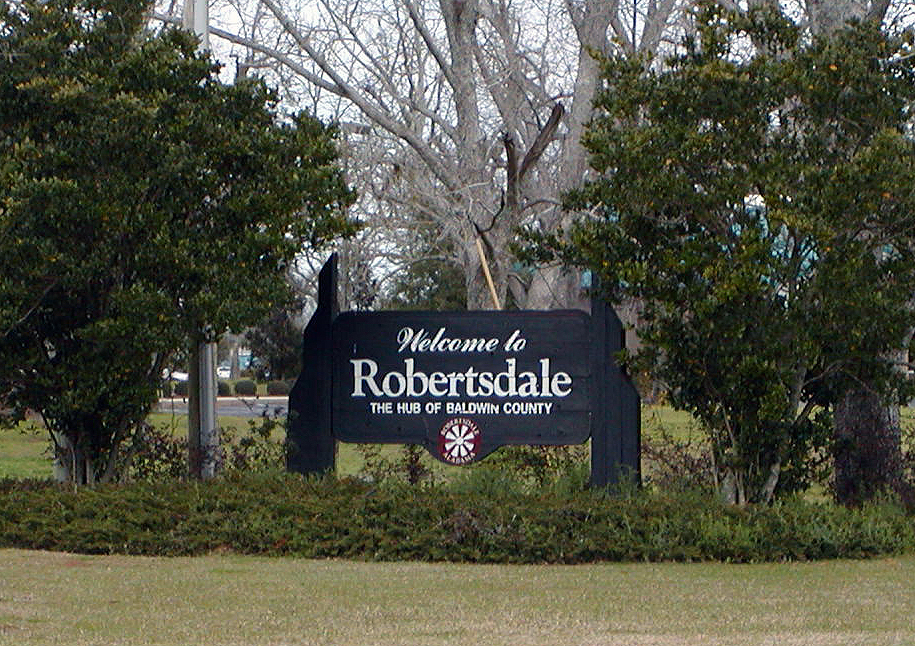
- Welcome sign

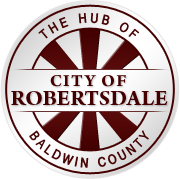
- Flag Seal
- Nickname: The Hub of Baldwin County
- Location of Robertsdale in Baldwin County, Alabama.
- Coordinates: 30°33′13″N 87°42′09″W
- Country: United States
- State: Alabama
- County: Baldwin
- Incorporated: 1921

Area
  - Total: 6.93 sq mi (17.94 km^{2})
  - Land: 6.92 sq mi (17.91 km^{2})
  - Water: 0.012 sq mi (0.03 km^{2})
- Elevation: 144 ft (44 m)

Population (2020)
  - Total: 6,708
  - Density: 970.1/sq mi (374.56/km^{2})
- Time zone: UTC-6 (CST)
  - Summer (DST): UTC-5 (CDT)
- ZIP codes: 36567, 36574
- Area code: 251
- FIPS code: 01-65208
- GNIS feature ID: 2404632
- Website: www.robertsdale.org

Robertsdale is a city in Baldwin County, Alabama, United States, which includes the community of Rosinton. At the 2020 census, the population was 6,708. It is part of the Daphne-Fairhope-Foley metropolitan area.

== Geography ==
Robertsdale is located in southern Baldwin County. U.S. Route 90 (Old Spanish Trail) passes through the city, leading west 24 miles (39 km) to Mobile and east 35 miles (56 km) to Pensacola, Florida. There is also I-10 in this city.

According to the U.S. Census Bureau, the city has a total area of 5.5 square miles (14.2 km^{2}), of which 0.012 square miles (0.03 km^{2}), or 0.24%, is water.

=== Climate ===
Climate data for Robertsdale, Alabama (1991–2020)
Month	Jan	Feb	Mar	Apr	May	Jun	Jul	Aug	Sep	Oct	Nov	Dec	Year
Mean daily maximum °F (°C)	61.0 (16.1)	64.9 (18.3)	71.1 (21.7)	76.8 (24.9)	83.9 (28.8)	88.2 (31.2)	89.8 (32.1)	89.5 (31.9)	86.5 (30.3)	79.1 (26.2)	69.9 (21.1)	63.1 (17.3)	77.0 (25.0)
Daily mean °F (°C)	50.0 (10.0)	53.4 (11.9)	59.6 (15.3)	65.5 (18.6)	73.1 (22.8)	79.0 (26.1)	81.0 (27.2)	80.7 (27.1)	76.9 (24.9)	67.8 (19.9)	58.2 (14.6)	52.2 (11.2)	66.5 (19.1)
Mean daily minimum °F (°C)	38.9 (3.8)	42.0 (5.6)	48.1 (8.9)	54.2 (12.3)	62.4 (16.9)	69.8 (21.0)	72.2 (22.3)	71.8 (22.1)	67.3 (19.6)	56.5 (13.6)	46.5 (8.1)	41.3 (5.2)	55.9 (13.3)
Average precipitation inches (mm)	5.51 (140)	4.46 (113)	5.51 (140)	5.58 (142)	4.42 (112)	7.07 (180)	9.11 (231)	6.91 (176)	6.40 (163)	4.22 (107)	4.77 (121)	5.02 (128)	68.98 (1,753)
Average snowfall inches (cm)	0.0 (0.0)	0.0 (0.0)	0.0 (0.0)	0.0 (0.0)	0.0 (0.0)	0.0 (0.0)	0.0 (0.0)	0.0 (0.0)	0.0 (0.0)	0.0 (0.0)	0.0 (0.0)	0.1 (0.25)	0.1 (0.25)
Source: NOAA

== Demographics ==
Historical population
Census	Pop.	Note	%±
1930	678		—
1940	779		14.9%
1950	1,128		44.8%
1960	1,474		30.7%
1970	2,078		41.0%
1980	2,306		11.0%
1990	2,401		4.1%
2000	3,782		57.5%
2010	5,276		39.5%
2020	6,708		27.1%
2025 (est.)	7,761	▲	15.7%
U.S. Decennial Census; 2013 Estimate

=== 2020 census ===
As of the 2020 census, Robertsdale had a population of 6,708. The median age was 35.8 years. 25.6% of residents were under the age of 18 and 16.6% of residents were 65 years of age or older. For every 100 females there were 86.6 males, and for every 100 females age 18 and over there were 81.7 males age 18 and over.

96.9% of residents lived in urban areas, while 3.1% lived in rural areas.

There were 2,532 households and 1,532 families residing in the city. Of all households, 36.5% had children under the age of 18 living in them. 44.5% were married-couple households, 16.3% were households with a male householder and no spouse or partner present, and 32.5% were households with a female householder and no spouse or partner present. About 26.4% of all households were made up of individuals, and 12.1% had someone living alone who was 65 years of age or older.

There were 2,703 housing units, of which 6.3% were vacant. The homeowner vacancy rate was 1.7% and the rental vacancy rate was 4.7%.

Robertsdale racial composition
Race	Num.	Perc.
White (non-Hispanic)	5,270	78.56%
Black or African American (non-Hispanic)	512	7.63%
Native American	36	0.54%
Asian	61	0.91%
Pacific Islander	3	0.04%
Other/Mixed	323	4.82%
Hispanic or Latino	503	7.5%

=== 2010 census ===
As of the census of 2010, there were 5,276 people, 1,951 households, and 1,392 families residing in the city. The population density was 968 inhabitants per square mile (374/km^{2}). There were 1,573 housing units at an average density of 357.3 per square mile (138.0/km^{2}). The racial makeup of the city was 85.3% White, 5.4% Black or African American, 0.8% Native American, 0.5% Asian, 6.1% from other races, and 1.9% from two or more races. 9.2% of the population were Hispanic or Latino of any race.

There were 1,951 households, out of which 36.1% had children under the age of 18 living with them, 51.4% were married couples living together, 14.6% had a female householder with no husband present, and 28.7% were non-families. 23.7% of all households were made up of individuals, and 10.2% had someone living alone who was 65 years of age or older. The average household size was 2.64 and the average family size was 3.10.

In the city, the population was 27.3% under the age of 18, 9.0% from 18 to 24, 28.7% from 25 to 44, 20.9% from 45 to 64, and 14.2% who were 65 years of age or older. The median age was 33.8 years. For every 100 females, there were 89.7 males. For every 100 females age 18 and over, there were 93.9 males. The median income for a household in the city was $41,750, and the median income for a family was $47,253. Males had a median income of $41,822 versus $26,239 for females. The per capita income for the city was $20,696. About 8.1% of families and 10.1% of the population were below the poverty line, including 12.2% of those under age 18 and 9.7% of those age 65 or over.

== Education ==
Robertsdale is a part of the Baldwin County Public Schools system. Three elementary schools, a middle school, and a high school serve Robertsdale. A vocational school is also located in Robertsdale.

=== Schools ===
==== Public ====
- Robertsdale High School (9-12)
- South Baldwin Center for Technology (11-12)
- Central Baldwin Middle School (7-8)
- Elsanor Elementary School (K-6)
- Robertsdale Elementary School (K-6)
- Rosinton Elementary School (K-6)

==== Private ====
- Central Christian School (K-12)
- St. Patrick Catholic School (K3-8)

== Transportation ==
The Baldwin Regional Area Transit System (BRATS) provides demand-responsive transit services within Robertsdale and Baldwin County.

This also has the last exits of I-10 in Alabama.

== Events ==
- The city of Robertsdale hosts the Baldwin County Fair every fall for at least four days.
- The city of Robertsdale holds a parade every December 7.

== Notable people ==
- Joe Childress, former NFL running back
- Tim Cook, CEO of Apple Inc.
- Obie Trotter, professional basketball player

== See also ==
- Central Baldwin
