= Bay Minette, Alabama =

City in and county seat of Baldwin County, Alabama

- City
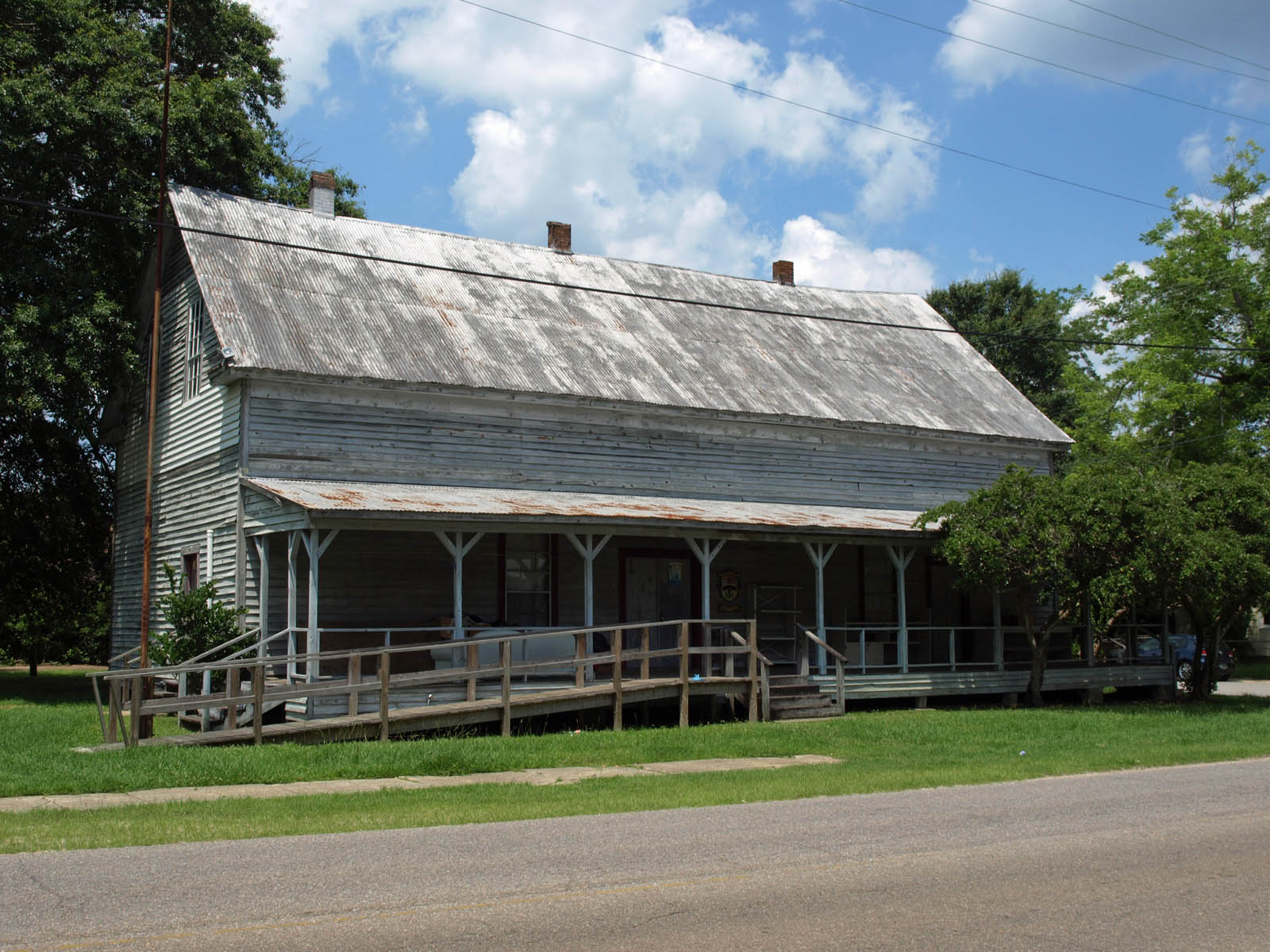
- Historic Rhodes Store of Bay Minette

- Flag Seal

- Location of Bay Minette in Baldwin County, Alabama.
- Coordinates: 30°53′40″N 87°46′35″W
- Country: United States
- State: Alabama
- County: Baldwin
- Incorporated: 1907

Area
  - Total: 17.34 sq mi (44.91 km^{2})
  - Land: 17.26 sq mi (44.71 km^{2})
  - Water: 0.077 sq mi (0.20 km^{2})
- Elevation: 272 ft (83 m)

Population (2020)
  - Total: 8,107
  - Density: 469.6/sq mi (181.33/km^{2})
- Time zone: UTC-6 (Central (CST))
  - Summer (DST): UTC-5 (CDT)
- ZIP code: 36507
- Area code: 251
- FIPS code: 01-04660
- GNIS feature ID: 2403825
- Website: cityofbayminetteal.gov

Bay Minette is a city in and the county seat of Baldwin County, Alabama, United States. As of the 2020 census, the population of the city was 8,107.

== History ==
In the first days of Baldwin County, the town of McIntosh Bluff (now in Mobile County, west of Baldwin County) on the Tombigbee River was the county seat. After being transferred to the town of Blakeley in 1810, the county seat was later moved to the city of Daphne in 1868. In 1900, by an act of the legislature of Alabama, the county seat was authorized for relocation to the city of Bay Minette; however, the city of Daphne resisted relocation. The citizens of Bay Minette moved the county records from Daphne in the middle of the night on October 11–12, 1901 and delivered them to the city of Bay Minette, where the Baldwin County seat remains to this day. Bay Minette was not incorporated as a city until 1907. A mural for the new post office built in 1937 was commissioned by the WPA and painted by Hilton Leech to commemorate this event.

In September 2011, the town attempted to enact a program called "Operation Restore Our Community". It would have allowed those convicted of a misdemeanor to substitute imprisonment with mandatory church attendance for one year. However, this program was challenged due to violating separation of church and state, and the program's start was delayed for judicial review. It appears to have been scrapped.

== Geography ==
Bay Minette is located near the center of Baldwin County in southern Alabama. It is sited on high ground 5 miles (8 km) east of the Mobile River/Tensaw River valley and 6 miles (10 km) west of the Florida border formed by the Perdido River. U.S. Route 31 passes through the center of the city.

According to the U.S. Census Bureau, the city has a total area of 8.6 square miles (22.4 km^{2}), of which 8.6 square miles (22.2 km^{2}) is land and 0.077 square miles (0.2 km^{2}), or 0.75%, is water.

=== Climate ===
The climate in this area is characterized by hot, humid summers and generally mild to cool winters. According to the Köppen Climate Classification system, Bay Minette has a humid subtropical climate, abbreviated "Cfa" on climate maps.

Climate data for Bay Minette, Alabama, 1991–2020 normals, extremes 1893–present
Month	Jan	Feb	Mar	Apr	May	Jun	Jul	Aug	Sep	Oct	Nov	Dec	Year
Record high °F (°C)	85 (29)	84 (29)	89 (32)	94 (34)	100 (38)	105 (41)	104 (40)	104 (40)	106 (41)	97 (36)	88 (31)	84 (29)	106 (41)
Mean maximum °F (°C)	75.5 (24.2)	77.4 (25.2)	82.6 (28.1)	85.4 (29.7)	91.2 (32.9)	94.3 (34.6)	95.3 (35.2)	94.9 (34.9)	93.1 (33.9)	88.3 (31.3)	81.4 (27.4)	76.7 (24.8)	96.6 (35.9)
Mean daily maximum °F (°C)	61.0 (16.1)	64.7 (18.2)	71.4 (21.9)	77.3 (25.2)	84.1 (28.9)	88.5 (31.4)	90.0 (32.2)	89.9 (32.2)	86.9 (30.5)	79.1 (26.2)	69.6 (20.9)	62.7 (17.1)	77.1 (25.1)
Daily mean °F (°C)	51.0 (10.6)	54.5 (12.5)	60.8 (16.0)	67.0 (19.4)	74.4 (23.6)	80.0 (26.7)	81.8 (27.7)	81.5 (27.5)	78.1 (25.6)	68.9 (20.5)	59.2 (15.1)	53.0 (11.7)	67.5 (19.7)
Mean daily minimum °F (°C)	40.9 (4.9)	44.3 (6.8)	50.3 (10.2)	56.7 (13.7)	64.7 (18.2)	71.4 (21.9)	73.5 (23.1)	73.1 (22.8)	69.3 (20.7)	58.7 (14.8)	48.8 (9.3)	43.2 (6.2)	57.9 (14.4)
Mean minimum °F (°C)	22.2 (−5.4)	26.9 (−2.8)	32.1 (0.1)	40.3 (4.6)	50.6 (10.3)	63.1 (17.3)	67.7 (19.8)	66.5 (19.2)	57.2 (14.0)	41.1 (5.1)	30.7 (−0.7)	26.9 (−2.8)	20.2 (−6.6)
Record low °F (°C)	2 (−17)	−4 (−20)	16 (−9)	28 (−2)	37 (3)	51 (11)	54 (12)	56 (13)	41 (5)	31 (−1)	19 (−7)	7 (−14)	−4 (−20)
Average precipitation inches (mm)	6.14 (156)	5.06 (129)	4.94 (125)	5.40 (137)	5.88 (149)	7.66 (195)	8.18 (208)	7.11 (181)	7.27 (185)	3.93 (100)	4.55 (116)	5.70 (145)	71.82 (1,826)
Average snowfall inches (cm)	0.0 (0.0)	0.0 (0.0)	0.1 (0.25)	0.0 (0.0)	0.0 (0.0)	0.0 (0.0)	0.0 (0.0)	0.0 (0.0)	0.0 (0.0)	0.0 (0.0)	0.0 (0.0)	0.1 (0.25)	0.2 (0.5)
Average precipitation days (≥ 0.01 in)	10.5	8.6	7.8	7.0	7.7	11.5	15.0	13.1	9.3	5.8	7.1	9.4	112.8
Average snowy days (≥ 0.1 in)	0.0	0.0	0.0	0.0	0.0	0.0	0.0	0.0	0.0	0.0	0.0	0.0	0.0
Source: NOAA

== Demographics ==
Historical population
Census	Pop.	Note	%±
1910	749		—
1920	1,092		45.8%
1930	1,545		41.5%
1940	1,763		14.1%
1950	3,732		111.7%
1960	5,197		39.3%
1970	6,727		29.4%
1980	7,455		10.8%
1990	7,168		−3.8%
2000	7,820		9.1%
2010	8,044		2.9%
2020	8,107		0.8%
U.S. Decennial Census; 2013 Estimate

Bay Minette is part of the Daphne–Fairhope–Foley Micropolitan Statistical Area.

=== Racial and ethnic composition ===
Bay Minette city, Alabama – Racial and ethnic composition Note: the US Census treats Hispanic/Latino as an ethnic category. This table excludes Latinos from the racial categories and assigns them to a separate category. Hispanics/Latinos may be of any race.
Race / Ethnicity (NH = Non-Hispanic)	Pop 1980	Pop 1990	Pop 2000	Pop 2010	Pop 2020	% 1980	% 1990	% 2000	% 2010	% 2020
White alone (NH)	5,517	4,921	4,997	4,810	4,551	74.00%	68.65%	63.90%	59.80%	56.14%
Black or African American alone (NH)	1,835	2,121	2,603	2,826	2,862	24.61%	29.59%	33.29%	35.13%	35.30%
Native American or Alaska Native alone (NH)	65	58	44	77	89	0.87%	0.81%	0.56%	0.96%	1.10%
Asian alone (NH)	6	24	32	68	44	0.08%	0.33%	0.41%	0.85%	0.54%
Native Hawaiian or Pacific Islander alone (NH)	x	x	1	1	0	x	x	0.01%	0.01%	0.00%
Other race alone (NH)	0	1	7	6	23	0.00%	0.01%	0.09%	0.07%	0.28%
Mixed race or Multiracial (NH)	x	x	56	114	354	x	x	0.72%	1.42%	4.37%
Hispanic or Latino (any race)	20	43	80	142	184	0.27%	0.60%	1.02%	1.77%	2.27%
Total	7,455	7,168	7,820	8,044	8,107	100.00%	100.00%	100.00%	100.00%	100.00%

=== 2020 census ===
As of the 2020 census, Bay Minette had a population of 8,107. The median age was 37.3 years. 21.6% of residents were under the age of 18 and 18.1% of residents were 65 years of age or older. For every 100 females there were 94.5 males, and for every 100 females age 18 and over there were 91.5 males age 18 and over.

There were 2,935 households and 1,690 families; 30.7% of households had children under the age of 18 living in them. Of all households, 35.7% were married-couple households, 17.6% were households with a male householder and no spouse or partner present, and 41.5% were households with a female householder and no spouse or partner present. About 34.0% of all households were made up of individuals and 15.5% had someone living alone who was 65 years of age or older.

There were 3,285 housing units, of which 10.7% were vacant. The homeowner vacancy rate was 2.2% and the rental vacancy rate was 9.0%.

94.3% of residents lived in urban areas, while 5.7% lived in rural areas.

=== 2010 census ===
As of the census of 2010, there were 8,040 people, 2,744 households, and 1,884 families residing in the city. The population density was 930 inhabitants per square mile (360/km^{2}) . There were 3,586 housing units at an average density of 417 square miles (1,080 km^{2}) . The racial makeup of the city was 60.4% White, 35.3% Black or African American, 1.0% Native American, 0.8% Asian, 0.0% Pacific Islander, 0.8% from other races, and 1.7% from two or more races. 1.8% of the population were Hispanic or Latino of any race.

There were 2,744 households, out of which 30.6% had children under the age of 18 living with them, 41.6% were married couples living together, 21.5% had a female householder with no husband present, and 31.3% were non-families. 27.6% of all households were made up of individuals, and 11.4% had someone living alone who was 65 years of age or older. The average household size was 2.53 and the average family size was 3.08.

In the city, the population was 23.6% under the age of 18, 13.7% from 18 to 24, 24.0% from 25 to 44, 24.1% from 45 to 64, and 14.5% who were 65 years of age or older. The median age was 35.2 years. For every 100 females, there were 93.8 males. For every 100 females age 18 and over, there were 95.9 males. The median income for a household in the city was $32,389, and the median income for a family was $44,573. Males had a median income of $37,623 versus $23,125 for females. The per capita income for the city was $16,897. About 17.1% of families and 26.4% of the population were below the poverty line, including 33.9% of those under age 18 and 18.8% of those age 65 or over.

== Government ==
Bay Minette uses a mayor council government. The mayor is elected at large. The city council consists of five members who are elected from one of five districts.

== Education ==
=== Public schools ===
Bay Minette is a part of the Baldwin County Board of Education system.

High schools:

- Baldwin County High School (grades 9 through 12, BCHS, new)
- North Baldwin Center for Technology (grades 9 through 12)

Middle school:

- Bay Minette Middle School (grades 7 and 8, BMMS)

Elementary school:

- Bay Minette Elementary School (grades K through 6, BMES)

=== Higher education ===
- Coastal Alabama Community College

== Media ==
Portions of the movie Close Encounters of the Third Kind were filmed near the town's Louisville and Nashville Railroad depot, and Friday the 13th Part VII: The New Blood was filmed in rural portions of Baldwin County near Bay Minette.

== Infrastructure ==
=== Transportation ===
Bay Minette Municipal Airport (1R8) is located 3 nautical miles (6 km) southwest of the central business district of Bay Minette.

Intercity bus service is provided by Greyhound Lines. Countywide dial-a-ride transit service is provided by BRATS, the Baldwin Regional Area Transit System.

Routes passing through the city include US 31 and Alabama State Route 59.

=== Emergency Services ===
Fire protection is provided by the Bay Minette Fire Department.

Emergency Medical Services are provided by MedStar.

Law enforcement agency is the Bay Minette Police Department.

== Notable people ==
- Wallace Gilberry, defensive end for the Cincinnati Bengals
- Todd Grisham, sports announcer for ESPN
- Ellis Hooks, soul blues singer and songwriter was born here
- John McMillan, State Treasurer of Alabama
- Anthony Mix, former wide receiver for Auburn University and NFL player
- Joe M. Rodgers, United States Ambassador to France
