= Baldwin County, Alabama =

County in Alabama, United States

- County
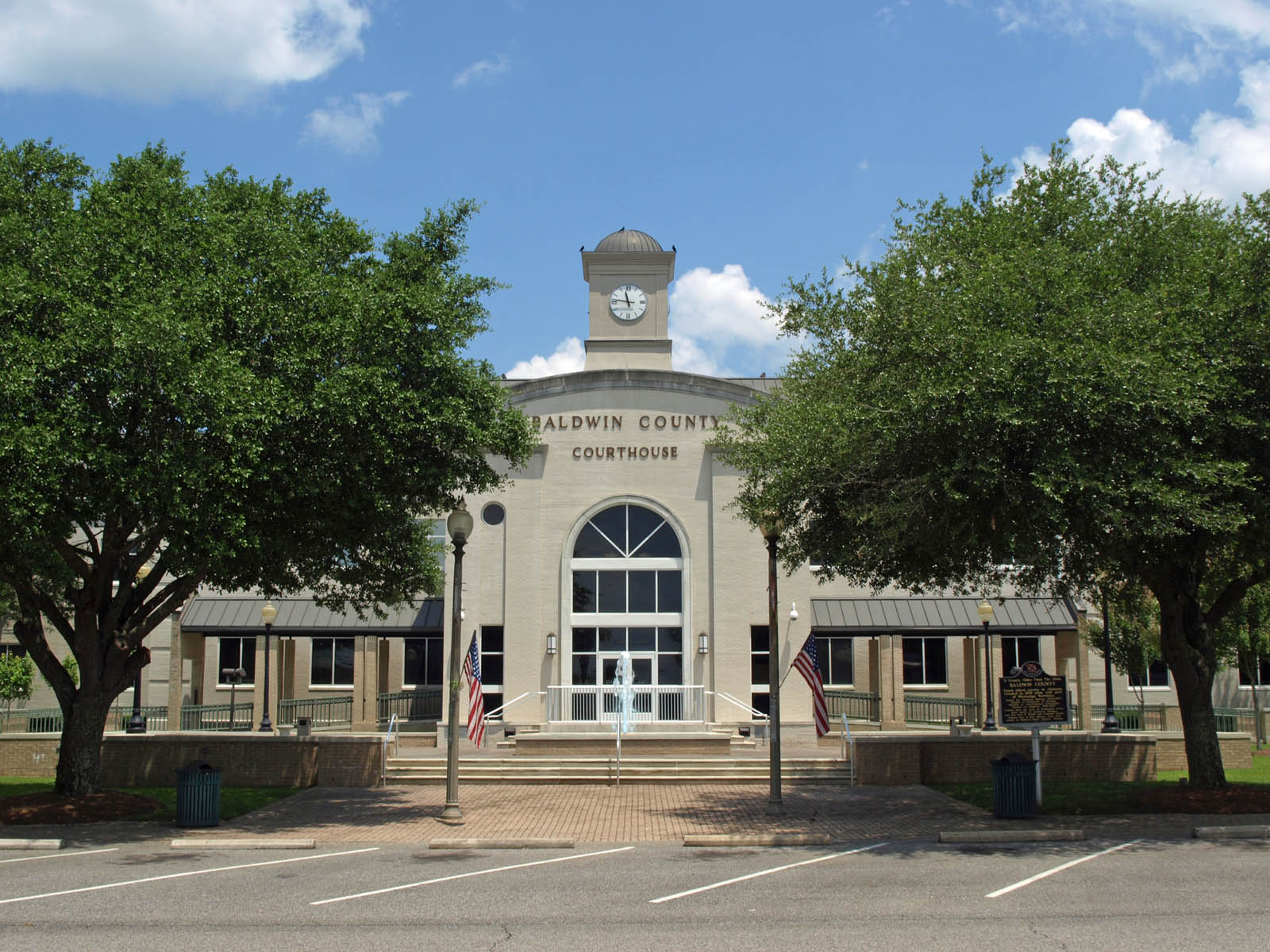
- The Baldwin County Courthouse in Bay Minette

- Seal

- Location within the U.S. state of Alabama
- Coordinates: 30°39′39″N 87°44′59″W
- Country: United States
- State: Alabama
- Founded: December 21, 1809
- Named for: Abraham Baldwin
- Seat: Bay Minette
- Largest city: Daphne

Area
  - Total: 2,027 sq mi (5,250 km^{2})
  - Land: 1,590 sq mi (4,100 km^{2})
  - Water: 437 sq mi (1,130 km^{2}) 21.6%

Population (2020)
  - Total: 231,767
  - Estimate (2025): 267,761 ▲
  - Density: 146/sq mi (56.3/km^{2})
- Time zone: UTC−6 (Central)
  - Summer (DST): UTC−5 (CDT)
- Congressional district: 1st
- Website: baldwincountyal.gov
- County Number 05 on Alabama License Plates; Largest County by population not shuffled to top 4 on Alabama License Plates

Baldwin County is a county located in the southwestern part of the U.S. state of Alabama, on the Gulf coast. It is one of only two counties in Alabama that border the Gulf of Mexico, along with Mobile County. As of the 2020 census, the population was 231,767, making it the fourth-most populous county in Alabama. The county seat is Bay Minette. The county is named after the founder of the University of Georgia, Senator Abraham Baldwin.

Baldwin was Alabama's fastest-growing county from 2010 to 2020, with 4 of the top 10 fastest-growing cities in the state in recent years.

The U.S. federal government designates Baldwin County as the Daphne-Fairhope-Foley metropolitan area.

It is the largest county in Alabama by area and is located on the eastern side of Mobile Bay. Part of its western border with Mobile County is formed by the Spanish River, a brackish distributary river.

== History ==
Baldwin County was established on December 21, 1809, ten years before Alabama became a state. Previously, the county had been a part of the Mississippi Territory until 1817, when the area was included in the separate Alabama Territory. Statehood was gained by Alabama in 1819.

There have been numerous border changes to the county as population grew and other counties were formed. Numerous armies have invaded during the Revolutionary War, War of 1812, and Civil War.

In the first days of Baldwin County, the town of McIntosh Bluff on the Tombigbee River was the county seat. (It is now included in Washington County, northwest of Baldwin County.) The county seat was transferred to the town of Blakeley in 1820, and then to the city of Daphne in 1868. In 1900, by an act of the legislature of Alabama, the county seat was authorized for relocation to the city of Bay Minette; however, the city of Daphne resisted this relocation.

To achieve the relocation, the men of Bay Minette devised a scheme. They fabricated a murder to lure the sheriff and his deputy out of the city of Daphne. While the law was chasing down the fictitious killer during the late hours, the group of Bay Minette men stealthily traveled the seventeen miles (27 km) to Daphne, stole the Baldwin County Courthouse records, and delivered them to the city of Bay Minette, where Baldwin County's county seat remains. A New Deal mural, completed by WPA artists during the Great Depression, depicts these events. It hangs in the Bay Minette United States Post Office.

During the American Civil War, 32 men hailing from Baldwin County enlisted with a Union unit mustered in Pensacola, Florida, called the 1st Florida Cavalry Regiment. In 1860, Baldwin County was the least populous of Alabama's 52 counties. Half of the population were enslaved. There was also a large population of Muscogee (Creek) in the northern portion of the county.

During the Cold War, the vice president of Foley-based Gulf Telephone Company, John Mcclure Snook, formed a private militia to resist a potential Communist invasion from the Gulf of Mexico. Due to this militia being armed with automatic weapons from Snook's personal collection, the federal government seized the weapons as part of an order during a 1964 libel proceeding. Although Snook paid the taxes imposed on the manufacture of automatic firearms, he sued for a refund on the basis that his militia served as auxiliary deputies for the Baldwin County Sheriff. The United States Court of Appeals for the Fifth Circuit rejected this argument in a 1971 decision as his militia never performed services where use of those weapons were deemed necessary.

Due to its proximity to the Gulf of Mexico, Baldwin County frequently endures tropical weather systems, including hurricanes. Since the late 20th century, the county has been declared a disaster area multiple times. This was due to heavy damages in September 1979 from Hurricane Frederic, July 1997 from Hurricane Danny, September 1998 from Hurricane Georges, September 2004 from Hurricane Ivan, August 2005 from Hurricane Katrina and September 2020 from Hurricane Sally.

=== 2016 flag controversy ===
Baldwin County attracted national attention after the 2016 Orlando nightclub shooting as the only county in the United States to refuse to lower its flags to half-staff. Both President Obama and Alabama governor Robert Bentley had ordered all flags to be lowered immediately following the attack, which was believed to have specifically targeted the LGBTQ community. Citing the U.S. Flag Code, Baldwin County commissioner Tucker Dorsey stated that while his "heart certainly goes out to the victims and their families", the incident "doesn't meet the test of the reason for the flag to be lowered".

== Geography ==
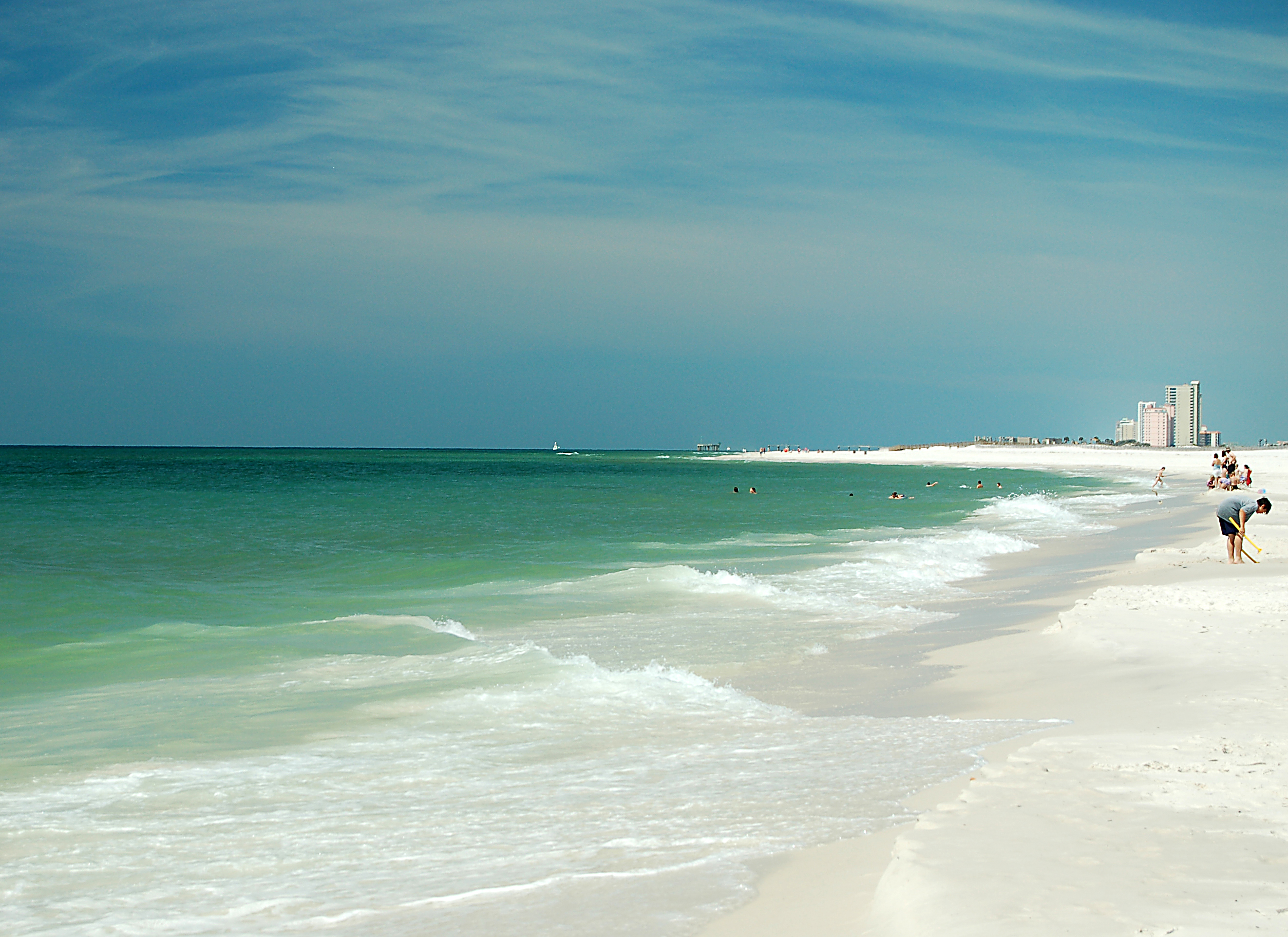
Baldwin County's beaches

According to the United States Census Bureau, the county has a total area of 2,027 square miles (5,250 km^{2}), of which 1,590 square miles (4,100 km^{2}) is land and 437 square miles (1,130 km^{2}) (21.6%) is water. It is the largest county by area in Alabama and the 12th-largest county east of the Mississippi River. It is larger than the US state of Rhode Island.

=== Central Baldwin ===
Central Baldwin is a colloquial term referring to an area of Baldwin County along Alabama State Highway 59. The area begins at the Interstate 10 exit in Loxley including Robertsdale and ending with Summerdale. The unofficial boundary is generally considered to be the public school district served by Robertsdale High School. The term began to be used by most people in the area with the creation of Central Baldwin Middle School in the late 1990s. Although students in Summerdale attend Elberta High School rather than Robertsdale High School it is generally considered a part of the Central Baldwin region.

Central Baldwin is composed of four municipalities, Robertsdale, Loxley, Summerdale, and Silverhill (the only town that does not contain a section of Highway 59). Three smaller communities: Rosinton, Elsanor, and Seminole are also often included in the region. Robertsdale serves as the economic hub of this region because it is the largest city and consists of many public works buildings. There is also a livestock auction, a large feed and seed store, and a rodeo venue to serve the large farmlands of the region. Loxley is becoming a popular location for the expansion of the suburbs from Daphne and Spanish Fort because it is served by an Interstate 10 exit and is almost directly in between the large cities of Mobile, Alabama, and Pensacola, Florida. Loxley also has a large privately owned farmers' market that is popular among the locals and tourists traveling to the beach.

=== Adjacent counties ===
- Monroe County - northeast
- Escambia County, Florida - east
- Escambia County, Alabama - east
- Mobile County - west
- Washington County - northwest
- Clarke County - northwest

=== Regions ===
- North Baldwin
- Eastern Shore
- Central Baldwin
- South Baldwin
- Southwest Baldwin
- East Baldwin

=== Environmental recognition ===
Two separate areas in Baldwin County have been designated as "Outstanding Alabama Water" by the Alabama Environmental Management Commission, which oversees the Alabama Department of Environmental Management. As of April 2007, only two other areas in Alabama have received what is the "highest environmental status" in the state. A portion of Wolf Bay and 42 miles (68 km) of the Tensaw River in northern Baldwin County have received the designation. Officials believe the "pristine water" will become an important eco-tourism destination.

=== National protected area ===
- Bon Secour National Wildlife Refuge (part)

== Transportation ==
=== Major highways ===
- Interstate 10
- Interstate 65
- U.S. Highway 31 / State Route 3 (unsigned)
- U.S. Highway 90 / State Route 16 (unsigned)
- U.S. Highway 98 / State Route 42 (unsigned)
- State Route 59
- State Route 104
- State Route 180
- State Route 181
- State Route 182
- State Route 225
- State Route 287
- Baldwin Beach Express

=== Airports ===
- Bay Minette, 1R8, has a single runway 08/26 that is 5,497'
- Fairhope, KCQF, has a single runway 01/19 that is 6,604'
- Foley, 5R4, has a single runway 18/36 that is 3,700'
- Stockton, Hubbard Landing Seaplane Base HL2 has one water runway that is 6,000’
- Gulf Shores, Jack Edwards Airport JKA has two runways, 09/27 at 6,962' and 17/35 at 3,596'

There are numerous private airports and heliports in Baldwin County. Considerable military airspace overlies much of the county and adjacent bay and coastal waters.

Commercial, scheduled service is from Mobile Regional Airport, Mobile Downtown Airport, or Pensacola International Airport.

== Demographics ==
=== Racial and ethnic composition ===
Baldwin County, Alabama – Racial and ethnic composition Note: the US Census treats Hispanic/Latino as an ethnic category. This table excludes Latinos from the racial categories and assigns them to a separate category. Hispanics/Latinos may be of any race.
Race / Ethnicity (NH = Non-Hispanic)	Pop 2000	Pop 2010	Pop 2020	% 2000	% 2010	% 2020
White alone (NH)	120,868	152,200	186,495	86.08%	83.50%	80.47%
Black or African American alone (NH)	14,357	16,966	18,001	10.22%	9.31%	7.77%
Native American or Alaska Native alone (NH)	753	1,146	1,291	0.54%	0.63%	0.56%
Asian alone (NH)	531	1,340	2,029	0.38%	0.74%	0.88%
Pacific Islander alone (NH)	37	79	122	0.03%	0.04%	0.05%
Other race alone (NH)	104	245	775	0.07%	0.13%	0.33%
Mixed race or Multiracial (NH)	1,299	2,297	10,368	0.93%	1.26%	4.47%
Hispanic or Latino (any race)	2,466	7,992	12,686	1.76%	4.38%	5.47%
Total	140,415	182,265	231,767	100.00%	100.00%	100.00%

Historical population
Census	Pop.	Note	%±
1810	1,427		—
1820	1,713		20.0%
1830	2,324		35.7%
1840	2,951		27.0%
1850	4,414		49.6%
1860	7,530		70.6%
1870	6,004		−20.3%
1880	8,603		43.3%
1890	8,941		3.9%
1900	13,194		47.6%
1910	18,178		37.8%
1920	20,730		14.0%
1930	28,289		36.5%
1940	32,324		14.3%
1950	40,997		26.8%
1960	49,088		19.7%
1970	59,382		21.0%
1980	78,556		32.3%
1990	98,280		25.1%
2000	140,415		42.9%
2010	182,265		29.8%
2020	231,767		27.2%
2025 (est.)	267,761	▲	15.5%
U.S. Decennial Census; 1790–1960 1900–1990; 1990–2000 2010–2020

=== 2020 census ===
As of the 2020 census, the county had a population of 231,767. The median age was 44.0 years. 21.3% of residents were under the age of 18 and 21.9% of residents were 65 years of age or older. For every 100 females there were 94.5 males, and for every 100 females age 18 and over there were 91.7 males age 18 and over.

The racial makeup of the county was 81.7% White, 7.9% Black or African American, 0.7% American Indian and Alaska Native, 0.9% Asian, 0.1% Native Hawaiian and Pacific Islander, 2.3% from some other race, and 6.5% from two or more races. Hispanic or Latino residents of any race comprised 5.5% of the population.

62.4% of residents lived in urban areas, while 37.6% lived in rural areas.

There were 93,116 households in the county, of which 28.5% had children under the age of 18 living with them and 25.8% had a female householder with no spouse or partner present. About 26.0% of all households were made up of individuals and 12.5% had someone living alone who was 65 years of age or older.

There were 124,148 housing units, of which 25.0% were vacant. Among occupied housing units, 74.3% were owner-occupied and 25.7% were renter-occupied. The homeowner vacancy rate was 2.1% and the rental vacancy rate was 24.3%.

=== 2010 census ===
As of the census of 2010, there were 182,265 people, 73,180 households, and 51,151 families residing in the county. The population density was 110 people per square mile (42 people/km^{2}). There were 104,061 housing units at an average density of 54 units per square mile (21 units/km^{2}). The racial makeup of the county was 85.7% White, 9.4% Black or African American, 0.7% Native American, 0.7% Asian, 0.04% Pacific Islander, 2.0% from other races, and 1.5% from two or more races. 4.4% of the population were Hispanic or Latino of any race.

There were 73,180 households, out of which 28.0% had children under the age of 18 living with them, 54.5% were married couples living together, 11.1% had a female householder with no husband present, and 30.1% were non-families. 25.1% of all households were made up of individuals, and 10.2% had someone living alone who was 65 years of age or older. The average household size was 2.46 and the average family size was 2.93.

In the county, the population was spread out, with 23% under the age of 18, 10.6% from 18 to 24, 24.4% from 25 to 44, 28.3% from 45 to 64, and 16.9% who were 65 years of age or older. The median age was 41.1 years. For every 100 females, there were 95.7 males. For every 100 females age 18 and over, there were 95.46 males.

The median income for a household in the county was $40,250, and the median income for a family was $47,028. Males had a median income of $34,507 versus $23,069 for females. The per capita income for the county was $20,826. 10.10% of the population and 7.60% of families were below the poverty line. 13.10% of those under the age of 18 and 8.90% of those 65 and older were living below the poverty line.

=== 2000 census ===
As of the census of 2000, 21.4% were of American, 12.5% English, 11.4% German and 9.9% Irish ancestry.

In 2000, the largest denominational groups were Evangelical Protestants (with 38,670 adherents) and Mainline Protestants (with 16,399 adherents). The largest religious bodies were the Southern Baptist Convention (with 27,789 members) and the Catholic Church (with 10,482 members).

== Education ==
Baldwin County contains three public school districts. There are approximately 32,500 students in public K-12 schools in Baldwin County. Prior to the 2019–2020 school year, there was only one school district, overseen by the Baldwin County Board of Education. The city of Gulf Shores has since set up its own school system, following a city council vote in 2017. In the spring of 2022, the city council of Orange Beach also voted to breakaway from the county school system.

There are Catholic elementary schools in the county, including Christ the King (Daphne), St. Patrick (Robertsdale) and St. Benedict (Elberta). Beginning in 2016, there is also a Catholic high school, St. Michael Catholic High School, located just east of Fairhope.

Coastal Alabama Community College has several campuses in the county. The United States Sports Academy is a private university focused on sports and located in Daphne.

=== School districts ===
School districts include:

- Baldwin County School District
- Gulf Shores City School District
- Orange Beach City School District - Formed in 2022

== Government ==
United States presidential election results for Baldwin County, Alabama
Year	Republican		Democratic		Third party(ies)	
Year	No.	%	No.	%	No.	%
1888	547	43.04%	724	56.96%	0	0.00%
1892	382	27.64%	912	65.99%	88	6.37%
1896	404	34.21%	726	61.47%	51	4.32%
1900	396	43.00%	444	48.21%	81	8.79%
1904	126	20.52%	454	73.94%	34	5.54%
1908	109	17.06%	439	68.70%	91	14.24%
1912	37	4.00%	623	67.28%	266	28.73%
1916	216	18.95%	766	67.19%	158	13.86%
1920	556	28.70%	1,230	63.50%	151	7.80%
1924	549	27.76%	1,023	51.72%	406	20.53%
1928	1,388	51.05%	1,317	48.44%	14	0.51%
1932	544	19.57%	2,098	75.47%	138	4.96%
1936	434	14.63%	2,338	78.80%	195	6.57%
1940	617	17.62%	2,681	76.58%	203	5.80%
1944	695	25.49%	2,002	73.41%	30	1.10%
1948	767	22.26%	0	0.00%	2,678	77.74%
1952	3,179	48.04%	3,386	51.17%	52	0.79%
1956	4,293	51.02%	3,878	46.08%	244	2.90%
1960	4,812	45.24%	5,647	53.09%	177	1.66%
1964	10,870	81.12%	0	0.00%	2,530	18.88%
1968	2,154	11.87%	1,821	10.04%	14,167	78.09%
1972	15,104	82.20%	2,923	15.91%	348	1.89%
1976	13,256	57.72%	9,191	40.02%	520	2.26%
1980	18,652	65.78%	8,448	29.80%	1,253	4.42%
1984	24,964	75.55%	7,272	22.01%	809	2.45%
1988	25,933	72.85%	9,271	26.04%	394	1.11%
1992	26,270	56.52%	12,195	26.24%	8,011	17.24%
1996	29,487	62.58%	12,776	27.11%	4,856	10.31%
2000	40,872	72.37%	13,997	24.78%	1,611	2.85%
2004	52,971	76.42%	15,599	22.50%	750	1.08%
2008	61,271	75.26%	19,386	23.81%	756	0.93%
2012	66,016	77.22%	18,424	21.55%	1,051	1.23%
2016	72,883	76.55%	18,458	19.39%	3,874	4.07%
2020	83,544	76.17%	24,578	22.41%	1,557	1.42%
2024	95,798	78.36%	24,934	20.40%	1,517	1.24%

United States Senate election results for Baldwin County, Alabama2
Year	Republican		Democratic		Third party(ies)	
Year	No.	%	No.	%	No.	%
2020	80,200	73.34%	28,925	26.45%	225	0.21%

United States Senate election results for Baldwin County, Alabama3
Year	Republican		Democratic		Third party(ies)	
Year	No.	%	No.	%	No.	%
2022	59,501	81.21%	11,478	15.67%	2,288	3.12%

Alabama Gubernatorial election results for Baldwin County
Year	Republican		Democratic		Third party(ies)	
Year	No.	%	No.	%	No.	%
2022	58,823	80.37%	10,296	14.07%	4,068	5.56%

Baldwin County was one of the earliest counties in Alabama in which the old-line Southern Democrats began splitting their tickets, even going so far as to vote for Dwight D. Eisenhower's 1956 re-election bid. Today, it is one of the most solidly Republican counties in Alabama. No Republican has failed to win a majority in the county since 1968, when it was easily carried by George Wallace running on a segregationist third-party ticket. The county has not voted for a Democratic presidential candidate since 1960.

The county is governed by a four-member county commission, elected from single-member districts. A sheriff, coroner, and revenue commissioner are elected in at-large positions countywide. The sheriff of Baldwin County is Anthony Lowery (R).

The commissioners are as follows:

District 1: James E. Ball (R)

District 2: Joseph Davis III (R)

District 3: Billie Jo Underwood (R)

District 4: Charles F. Gruber (R)

The coroner is Brian Pierce (R) and the district attorney is Robert Wilters (R).

=== Emergency Services ===
The Baldwin County Sheriff's Office is the primary law enforcement agency for unincorporated areas of Baldwin County. The current sheriff is Huey H. Mack, who joined the Sheriff's Office in 1989 as a criminal investigator. The first sheriff, Benjamin Baldwin, was appointed on December 21, 1809.

Several local police departments are the primary law enforcement agencies in their respective jurisdictions, as well as fire protection in Baldwin County is provided by various local fire departments.

Emergency medical services are provided by MedStar, with the exception of some cities, where the local fire department staffs ambulances.

== Media ==
=== Print ===
Robertsdale's The Independent is the primary newspaper read by the locals. The paper focuses on the Central Baldwin region.

== Commerce ==
Most of the businesses in Central Baldwin make a profit from tourists traveling to Gulf Shores and Orange Beach via Highway 59. This region is also where the Baldwin County Fair takes place.

== Communities ==
=== Cities ===
- Bay Minette (county seat)
- Daphne
- Fairhope
- Foley
- Gulf Shores
- Loxley
- Orange Beach
- Robertsdale (includes Rosinton)
- Spanish Fort

=== Towns ===
- Elberta
- Magnolia Springs
- Perdido Beach
- Silverhill
- Summerdale

=== Census-designated place ===
- Bon Secour
- Lillian
- Perdido
- Point Clear
- Stapleton
- Stockton

=== Unincorporated areas ===
- Barnwell
- Battles Wharf
- Blacksher
- Bromley
- Carpenter's Station
- Clay City
- Crossroads
- Elsanor
- Fort Morgan
- Gateswood
- Hurricane
- Josephine
- Latham
- Little River
- Malbis
- Marlow
- Miflin
- Montrose
- Ono Island
- Oyster Bay
- Rabun
- Seminole
- Tensaw

=== Ghost town ===
- Belle Fontaine
- Blakeley

=== County subdivisions ===
Historical census county divisions of Baldwin County

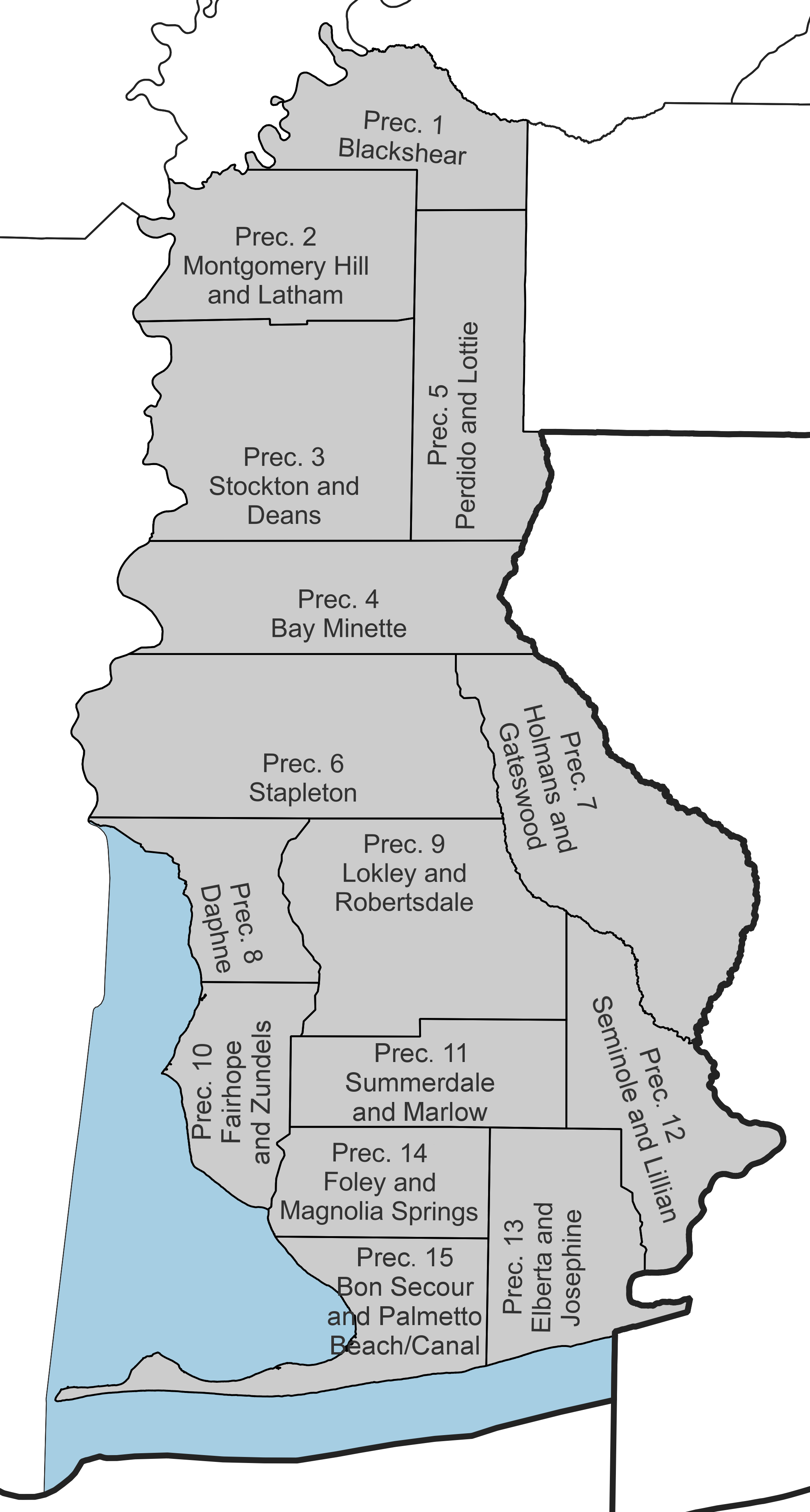
Approximate divisions used in the 1930–1950 censuses. Similar to those used from 1910 to 1920.

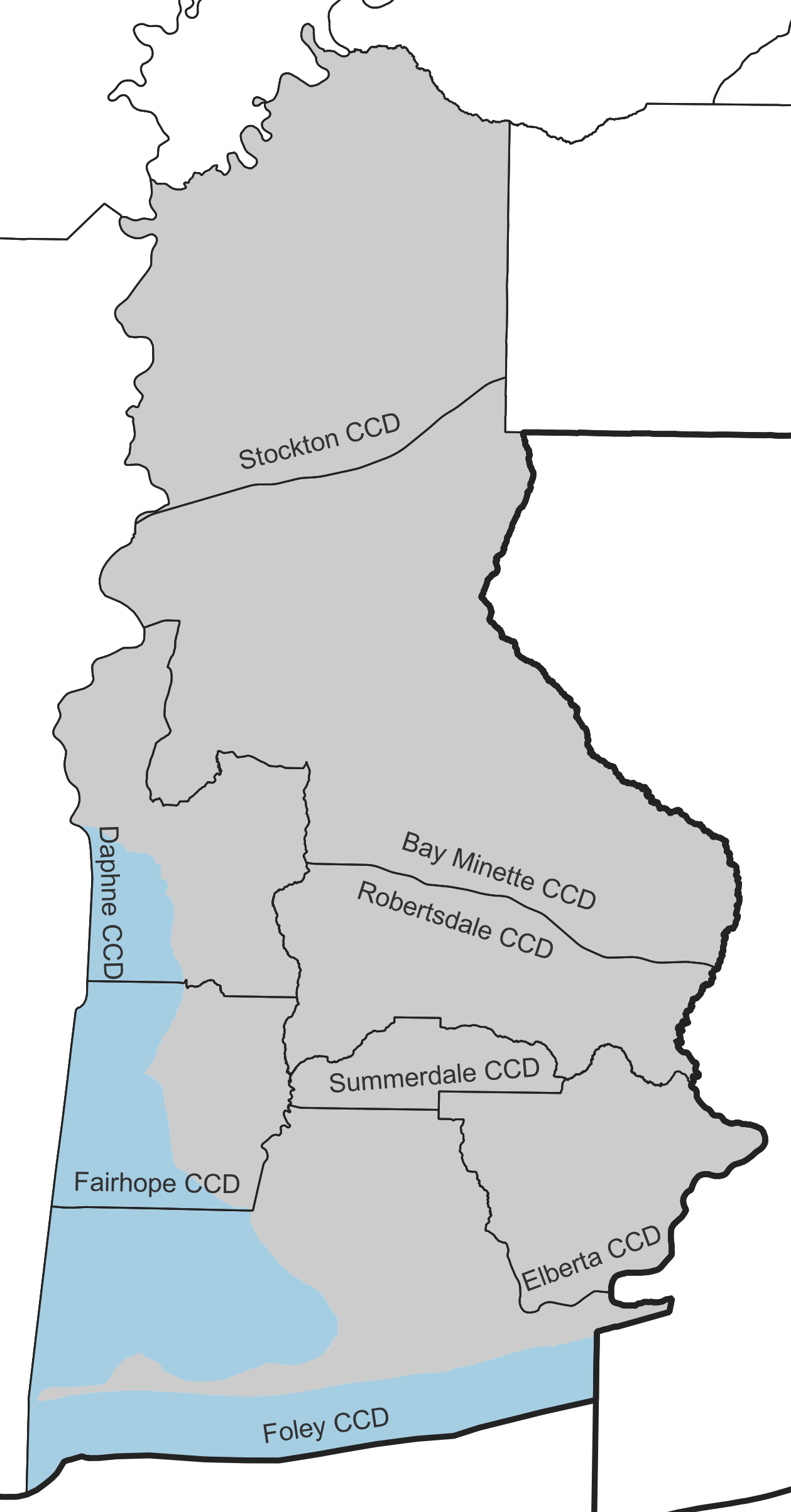
Current divisions as of the 2020 census. Similar to those used from 1970 to 2010.

The United States Census Bureau divides counties into county subdivisions. In Baldwin County, these are currently in to form of census county divisions. The county's historical subdivisions and their populations in the decennial censuses are as follows:

==== 1870 ====
Subdivision	1870
Township 1 south	160
Township 2 south	278
Township 3 south	480
Township 4 south	480
Township 5 south	640
Township 6 south	1,120
Township 7 south	640
Township 8 south	320
Township 9 south	320
Township 1 north	320
Township 2 north	480
Township 3 north	320
Township 4 north	446
County total	6,004

==== 1880 ====
Subdivision	1880
Beat 1	1,489
Beat 2	5,976
Beat 3	1,138
County total	8,603

==== 1890–1900 ====
Subdivision	1890	1900
Precinct 1, Montgomery Hill	2,035	2,268
Precinct 2, Stockton	943	1,387
Precinct 3, Perdido Station	470	1,075
Precinct 4, Bay Minette	1,022	1,593
Precinct 5, Halmons [sic]	492	632
Precinct 6, Sibleys Mill	294	939
Precinct 7, Courthouse (including Daphne)	641	1,099
Precinct 8, Battles Wharf	1,314	1,837
Precinct 9, Lowell	506	696
Precinct 10, Helton	346	490
Precinct 11, Shell Banks	310	769
Precinct 12, Camp Powell	568	409
County total	8,941	13,194

==== 1910–1950 ====
Subdivision	1910	1920	1930	1940	1950
Precinct 1, Blackshear [sic]	1,293	1,076	945	1,042	643
Precinct 2, Montgomery Hill and Latham	764	864	704	692	638
Precinct 3, Stockton and Deans	1,432	1,880	1,870	1,782	2,140
Precinct 4, Bay Minette	2,336	2,693	4,271	4,723	6,264
Precinct 5, Perdido and Lottie	1,012	1,710	1,834	2,024	1,832
Precinct 6, Stapleton and Ducks (1910–1920); Precinct 6, Stapleton (1930–1950)	900	1,021	1,045	1,330	1,437
Precinct 7, Holmans and Gateswood	757	1,011	519	585	489
Precinct 8, Daphne	1,507	1,608	2,131	2,723	3,814
Precinct 9, Loxley and Robertsdale (including Silverhill)	1,785	2,301	4,380	4,981	6,655
Precinct 10, Fairhope and Zundels	2,025	1,963	3,681	3,917	6,505
Precinct 11, Summerdale and Marlow	856	993	1,766	1,808	1,879
Precinct 12, Seminole and Lillian	437	356	605	1,049	964
Precinct 13, Elberta and Josephine	715	1,025	1,272	1,239	1,384
Precinct 14, Foley and Magnolia Springs	1,019	1,214	2,370	3,081	4,715
Precinct 15, Bon Secour and Palmetto Beach (1910–1940); Precinct 15, Bon Secour and Canal (1950)	1,340	1,015	896	1,348	1,638
County total	18,178	20,730	28,289	32,324	40,997

==== 1960–present ====
Subdivision	1960	1970	1980	1990	2000	2010	2020
Bay Minette CCD	10,788	13,347	17,040	18,058	21,877	23,604	25,186
Daphne CCD (including Spanish Fort)	5,402	8,461	13,563	19,135	28,904	41,295	55,767
Elberta CCD (including Perdido Beach)	2,385	3,076	4,230	6,341	10,473	10,957	13,668
Fairhope CCD	8,745	10,562	13,782	16,331	20,780	25,894	33,920
Foley CCD (including Gulf Shores, Magnolia Springs, and most of Orange Beach)	7,788	10,416	14,133	20,687	31,271	48,089	64,862
Perdido CCD	1,675	—	—	—	—	—	—
Robertsdale CCD (including Loxley and Silverhill)	7,847	8,257	9,993	11,849	18,854	24,317	29,160
Stockton CCD	2,899	3,470	3,704	3,565	4,161	3,804	3,745
Summerdale CCD	1,559	1,793	2,111	2,314	4,095	4,305	5,459
County total	49,088	59,382	78,556	98,280	140,415	182,265	231,767

== See also ==
- National Register of Historic Places listings in Baldwin County, Alabama
- Properties on the Alabama Register of Landmarks and Heritage in Baldwin County, Alabama
