= Area code 251 =

Telephone area code for southwest Alabama

Coordinates: 31°6′N 87°55′W

Numbering plan area 251 in Alabama

Area code 251 is a telephone area code in the North American Numbering Plan (NANP) for southwestern Alabama, serving Mobile, Baldwin, and Washington counties and parts of six other counties. It was created on June 18, 2001, as a split of numbering plan area 334. In order to allow people time to reprogram electronics such as computers, cell phones, pagers and fax machines, use of the 334 area code continued in the 251 areas through January 7, 2002.

Prior to October 2021, area code 251 had telephone numbers assigned for the central office code 988. In 2020, 988 was designated nationwide as a dialing code for the National Suicide Prevention Lifeline, which created a conflict for exchanges that permit seven-digit dialing. This area code was therefore scheduled to transition to ten-digit dialing by October 24, 2021.

== Service area ==
The numbering plan area comprises the following cities.

- Atmore
- Axis
- Bay Minette
- Bayou la Batre
- Bon Secour
- Brewton
- Chatom
- Chickasaw
- Citronelle
- Creola
- Daphne
- Dauphin Island
- East Brewton
- Elberta
- Evergreen
- Fairhope
- Flomaton
- Frisco City
- Foley
- Fort Morgan
- Grand Bay
- Grove Hill
- Gulf Shores
- Irvington
- Jackson
- Loxley
- Magnolia Springs
- Mobile
- Mon Louis
- Monroeville
- Orange Beach
- Perdido Beach
- Pine Apple
- Poarch
- Prichard
- Robertsdale
- Saraland
- Satsuma
- Semmes
- Silas
- Silverhill
- Spanish Fort
- Stapleton
- Stockton
- Summerdale
- Theodore
- Tillman's Corner
- Wagarville
- Wallace

== See also ==
- List of Alabama area codes
- List of North American Numbering Plan area codes

Alabama area codes: 205/659, 251, 256/938, 334
	North: 205/659, 334	
West: 228, 601/769	251	East: 334/483, 850/448
	South: 850/448, Gulf of Mexico	
Mississippi area codes: 228, 601/769, 471/662
Florida area codes: 239, 305/786/645, 321, 352, 386, 407/689, 561/728, 727, 772, 813/656, 850/448, 863, 904/324, 941, 954/754
