= National Register of Historic Places listings in Baldwin County, Alabama =

Location of Baldwin County in Alabama

This is a list of the National Register of Historic Places listings in Baldwin County, Alabama.

This is intended to be a complete list of the properties and districts on the National Register of Historic Places in Baldwin County, Alabama, United States. Latitude and longitude coordinates are provided for many National Register properties and districts; these locations may be seen together in an online map.

There are 65 properties and districts listed on the National Register in the county, including two National Historic Landmarks.

This National Park Service list is complete through NPS recent listings posted January 16, 2026.

== Current listings ==
	Name on the Register	Image	Date listed	Location	City or town	Description
1	Allen House	Allen House	December 20, 1988 (#88002809)	Off County Road 10 on the northern bank of the Bon Secour River; 30°18′09″N 87°44′13″W	Bon Secour	
2	American Legion Post 199	American Legion Post 199	September 6, 2018 (#100002858)	700 S Mobile St. 30°30′48″N 87°55′06″W	Fairhope	American Legion post building
3	Bank of Fairhope	Bank of Fairhope	July 1, 1988 (#88001008)	396 Fairhope Ave. 30°31′22″N 87°54′12″W	Fairhope	
4	Battles Wharf Historic District	Battles Wharf Historic District	April 28, 1988 (#88000107)	U.S. Route 98 (Eastern Shore Boulevard) roughly between Woolworth Ave. and Buerger La. 30°29′37″N 87°55′38″W	Battles Wharf	
5	Beckner House	Beckner House	July 1, 1988 (#88001007)	63 S. Church St. 30°31′15″N 87°54′17″W	Fairhope	
6	Blakeley	Blakeley	June 25, 1974 (#74000397)	Along the Tensaw River north of Spanish Fort; 30°44′32″N 87°55′27″W	Spanish Fort	
7	Carl L. Bloxham Building	Carl L. Bloxham Building	June 30, 1988 (#88001005)	327 Fairhope Ave. 30°31′23″N 87°54′15″W	Fairhope	
8	Bottle Creek Indian Mounds	Bottle Creek Indian Mounds	December 2, 1974 (#74000398)	Northern end of Mound Island along the eastern side of the Middle River; 31°00′32″N 87°56′24″W	Stockton	
9	Brodbeck–Zundel Historic District	Brodbeck–Zundel Historic District	April 28, 1988 (#88000520)	Scenic U.S. Route 98 and Old Marlow Rd. 30°28′27″N 87°55′09″W	Point Clear	
10	Brunell House (Jessamine St.)	Brunell House (Jessamine St.)	August 22, 1995 (#95001019)	12113 Jessamine St. 30°24′03″N 87°46′37″W	Magnolia Springs	Classical Revival cottage built in 1910
11	Captain Adams House		December 20, 1988 (#88002810)	907 Captain O'Neal Dr. 30°35′25″N 87°54′51″W	Daphne	
12	Clotilda (schooner)	Clotilda (schooner)	November 8, 2021 (#100007119)	Address Restricted	Mobile vicinity	
13	George W. Cullum House		June 14, 1990 (#90000930)	1915 Old County Rd. 30°36′19″N 87°54′39″W	Daphne	
14	Fairhope Bayfront District	Fairhope Bayfront District	July 1, 1988 (#88001003)	Roughly bounded by Blakeney, N. and S. Summit Sts., Fels Ave., and Mobile Bay; 30°31′28″N 87°54′32″W	Fairhope	
15	Fairhope Downtown Historic District	Fairhope Downtown Historic District	March 16, 2006 (#04000115)	Roughly bounded by Equality St., Fairhope Ave., Morphy Ave., School St., and Summit St. 30°31′21″N 87°54′11″W	Fairhope	
16	First Baptist Church	First Baptist Church	August 25, 1988 (#88001349)	Northern side of D'Olive St. 30°53′05″N 87°46′36″W	Bay Minette	
17	Foley Downtown Historic District	Foley Downtown Historic District	January 19, 2005 (#04001496)	Parts of Alston, McKenzie, E. and W. Laurel and W. Orange Sts.; also parts of Laurel & Pine Sts., W Myrtle, E & W Rose, W. Orange & W Jessamine Aves. 30°24′24″N 87°41′02″W	Foley	Boundaries originally encompassed parts of Alston, N. and S. McKenzie, U.S. Route 98, E. and W. Laurel, Myrtle, Rose, and W. Orange until a boundary decrease of June 4, 2012; boundaries further increased on September 20, 2019.
18	Fort Mims Site	Fort Mims Site	September 14, 1972 (#72000153)	Southwestern quarter of Section 36, Township 2 North, Range 2 East; 31°10′50″N 87°50′17″W	Tensaw	Site of a battle during the Creek War. On August 30, 1813, Red Stick Creeks killed or captured 517 settlers, militia, and their allies at Fort Mims.
19	Fort Morgan	Fort Morgan	October 15, 1966 (#66000146)	Western terminus of State Route 180; 30°13′41″N 88°01′23″W	Gasque	
20	Gaston Building	Gaston Building	July 1, 1988 (#88001004)	336 Fairhope Ave. 30°31′22″N 87°54′14″W	Fairhope	
21	Golf, Gun & Country Club	Golf, Gun & Country Club	July 1, 1988 (#88001002)	651 Johnson Ave. 30°31′22″N 87°53′41″W	Fairhope	
22	Governor's Club	Governor's Club	August 31, 2000 (#00001031)	11866 Magnolia St. 30°23′46″N 87°46′34″W	Magnolia Springs	Also known as "Brunell House", but different than Brunell House (Jessamine St.), also in Magnolia Springs
23	Hamner House	Hamner House	December 20, 1988 (#88002811)	Oak Rd. off County Road 6; 30°19′07″N 87°42′27″W	Bon Secour	
24	C.S.S. Huntsville and C.S.S. Tuscaloosa Historic and Archaeological District		July 18, 2022 (#100007894)	Address Restricted	Mobile vicinity	
25	Jenkins Farm and House	Jenkins Farm and House	December 20, 2016 (#16000862)	28898 Jenkins Farm Rd., 29040 Jenkins Farm Rd. 30°38′51″N 87°48′15″W	Loxley	A boundary increase was approved November 14, 2023.
26	Axil Johnson House	Axil Johnson House	July 3, 1997 (#97000649)	751 Edwards St. 30°31′39″N 87°53′24″W	Fairhope	
27	Killcreas House	Killcreas House	May 4, 1995 (#95000556)	46833 State Route 225; 30°54′26″N 87°51′23″W	Bay Minette	
28	Latham United Methodist Church	Latham United Methodist Church	August 25, 1988 (#88001350)	Eastern side of State Route 59; 31°05′54″N 87°49′51″W	Latham	
29	Lebanon Chapel AME Church	Lebanon Chapel AME Church	August 25, 1988 (#88001351)	Bounded by Young St. on the west and Middle St. on the north 30°30′48″N 87°53′39″W	Fairhope	
30	Magnolia Springs Historic District	Magnolia Springs Historic District	January 27, 2012 (#11001046)	Roughly along Oak, Spring, Bay, Jessamine, Magnolia, Pine & Rock Sts., Island, Cedar & Holly Aves. & Magnolia Springs Highway; 30°23′59″N 87°46′34″W	Magnolia Springs	
31	Malbis Plantation	Malbis Plantation	May 10, 2011 (#11000238)	10145 US 90; 30°39′13″N 87°50′32″W	Daphne	
32	Manly-Strong House	Manly-Strong House	August 22, 2019 (#100004134)	100 Deer Ct. 30°35′23″N 87°54′51″W	Daphne	
33	McMillan House	McMillan House	December 20, 1988 (#88002812)	1404 Captain O'Neal Ave. 30°35′52″N 87°54′42″W	Daphne	
34	Methodist Episcopal Church, South	Methodist Episcopal Church, South	September 22, 1980 (#80000679)	1608 Old County Rd. 30°36′06″N 87°54′31″W	Daphne	
35	Montgomery Hill Baptist Church	Montgomery Hill Baptist Church	August 25, 1988 (#88001352)	Eastern side of State Route 59 on County Road 80; 31°09′46″N 87°47′12″W	Tensaw	
36	Montrose Historic District	Montrose Historic District	June 3, 1976 (#76000310)	Main (State Route 42) and 2nd Sts. 30°34′07″N 87°54′02″W	Montrose	
37	Moore Store	Moore Store	November 30, 2001 (#00001027)	14770 Oak St. 30°24′04″N 87°46′15″W	Magnolia Springs	
38	Nelson House	Nelson House	December 20, 1988 (#88002814)	State Route 59, North; 31°05′08″N 87°49′52″W	Latham	
39	Nicholson House	Nicholson House	December 20, 1988 (#88002813)	County Road 6; 30°17′33″N 87°44′13″W	Oyster Bay	
40	Orrell House	Orrell House	December 20, 1988 (#88002815)	County Road 6; 30°18′59″N 87°42′14″W	Bon Secour	
41	People's Supply Company	People's Supply Company	February 21, 1997 (#97000096)	21950 Broad St. 30°32′41″N 87°45′03″W	Silverhill	
42	Point Clear Historic District	Point Clear Historic District	April 28, 1988 (#88000515)	Western side of U.S. Route 98/Eastern Shore Boulevard; 30°28′48″N 87°55′40″W	Point Clear	
43	St. Mark's Lutheran Church	St. Mark's Lutheran Church	August 25, 1988 (#88001353)	Western side of County Road 83; 30°25′01″N 87°35′55″W	Elberta	
44	St. Patrick's Catholic Church	St. Patrick's Catholic Church	August 25, 1988 (#88001354)	Eastern side of U.S. Route 90; 30°37′11″N 87°45′10″W	Loxley	
45	St. Paul's Episcopal Church	St. Paul's Episcopal Church	August 25, 1988 (#88001355)	Northern side of Oak Ave. 30°24′05″N 87°46′17″W	Magnolia Springs	
46	Sand Island Light	Sand Island Light	November 12, 1975 (#75000305)	Southwest of Fort Morgan off Mobile Point; 30°11′15″N 88°03′02″W	Fort Morgan	
47	School of Organic Education	School of Organic Education	July 1, 1988 (#88001010)	Bounded by Fairhope and Morphy Aves. and Bancroft and School Sts. 30°31′17″N 87°54′05″W	Fairhope	
48	Lewis Starke House		June 14, 1990 (#90000929)	2103 Old County Rd. 30°36′26″N 87°54′39″W	Daphne	
49	State Bank Silverhill	State Bank Silverhill	December 31, 2001 (#01001410)	15950 Silverhill Ave. 30°32′42″N 87°45′05″W	Silverhill	
50	Stockton Methodist Church	Stockton Methodist Church	August 25, 1988 (#88001356)	Eastern side of State Route 59; 31°00′57″N 87°51′11″W	Stockton	
51	Street House	Street House	December 20, 1988 (#88002816)	Wood Acres Rd. off County Road 3; 30°27′52″N 87°53′54″W	Point Clear	
52	Henry Stuart House	Henry Stuart House	October 27, 2006 (#05000841)	22787 U.S. Route 98; 30°33′23″N 87°53′38″W	Montrose	
53	Sunnyside Hotel	Sunnyside Hotel	February 20, 1998 (#98000111)	14469 Oak St. 30°23′59″N 87°46′36″W	Magnolia Springs	
54	Svea Land Company Office	Svea Land Company Office	March 7, 1985 (#85000443)	S. 6th St. 30°32′41″N 87°45′14″W	Silverhill	
55	Swift-Coles House	Swift-Coles House	December 6, 2016 (#16000814)	1 Swift Coles Ln. 30°18′46″N 87°43′35″W	Bon Secour	
56	Swift Presbyterian Church	Swift Presbyterian Church	August 25, 1988 (#88001357)	Swift Church Rd. 30°22′30″N 87°37′41″W	Miflin	
57	The Texas	The Texas	December 20, 1988 (#88002817)	306 Dryer Ave. 30°36′02″N 87°54′37″W	Daphne	
58	Twelvemile Island Ship Graveyard Historical and Archaeological District		December 6, 2021 (#100007203)	Address Restricted; 30°47′30″N 87°59′32″W	Mobile vicinity	
59	Twin Beach AME Church	Twin Beach AME Church	August 25, 1988 (#88001358)	Southern side of County Road 44; 30°30′04″N 87°54′34″W	Fairhope	
60	U.S.S. TECUMSEH	U.S.S. TECUMSEH	May 14, 1975 (#75000306)	Northwest of Fort Morgan in Mobile Bay; 30°13′54″N 88°01′33″W	Fort Morgan	
61	US Post Office	US Post Office	July 1, 1988 (#88001001)	325 Fairhope Ave. 30°31′23″N 87°54′15″W	Fairhope	
62	Walker House		December 20, 1988 (#88002818)	905 Captain O'Neal Dr. 30°35′23″N 87°54′51″W	Daphne	
63	White Avenue Historic District	White Avenue Historic District	July 1, 1988 (#88001009)	White Ave. 30°31′10″N 87°54′04″W	Fairhope	
64	Whittier Hall	Whittier Hall	March 7, 1985 (#85000442)	201 Magnolia Ave. 30°31′29″N 87°53′45″W	Fairhope	
65	Zurhorst House	Zurhorst House	July 1, 1988 (#88001006)	200 Fels Ave. 30°31′16″N 87°54′23″W	Fairhope	

== See also ==
- List of National Historic Landmarks in Alabama
- National Register of Historic Places listings in Alabama
