= Methodist Episcopal Church (disambiguation) =

The Methodist Episcopal Church was the first Methodist denomination founded in the United States.

Methodist Episcopal Church may also refer to:

== Individual congregations ==
- Methodist Episcopal Church (Yuma, Arizona)
- Methodist Episcopal Church (Idaho Springs, Colorado)
- Methodist Episcopal Church (Greenwich, Connecticut)
- Methodist Episcopal Church (Emmett, Idaho)
- Methodist Episcopal Church (Salem, Illinois)
- Methodist Episcopal Church (Lancaster, Kentucky)
- Methodist Episcopal Church (Ottawa, Minnesota)
- Hamline Methodist Episcopal Church, St. Paul, Minnesota, listed on the NRHP in Ramsey County
- Methodist Episcopal Church (Bozeman, Montana)
- Methodist Episcopal Church (Three Forks, Montana), listed on the NRHP in Gallatin County
- Methodist Episcopal Church (Stratford, New Hampshire), listed on the New Hampshire State Register of Historic Places
- Methodist Episcopal Church (Hibernia, New Jersey)
- Methodist Episcopal Church (Madison, New Jersey)
- Methodist Episcopal Church (Dryden, New York)
- Methodist Episcopal Church (Orleans, New York)
- Methodist Episcopal Church (Stony Creek, New York)
- Methodist Episcopal Church (Devils Lake, North Dakota)
- Methodist Episcopal Church (Crestline, Ohio)
- Methodist Episcopal Church (Pierre, South Dakota)
- Methodist Episcopal Church (Scotland, South Dakota)
- Methodist Episcopal Church (Stannard, Vermont)
- Methodist Episcopal Church (Swanton, Vermont)
- Methodist Episcopal Church (Buffalo, Wyoming)

== Other Methodist denominations ==
- African Methodist Episcopal Church, predominantly African-American, founded in 1816
- African Methodist Episcopal Zion Church, predominantly African-American, founded in 1821
- Christian Methodist Episcopal Church, predominantly African-American, founded in 1870
- Methodist Episcopal Church, South, split from the MEC in 1845 over slavery, reunited as the Methodist Church in 1939

== See also ==
- Methodist Episcopal Church, South (disambiguation)
- First Methodist Episcopal Church (disambiguation)
