= Methodist Episcopal Church, South (disambiguation) =

Methodist Episcopal Church, South is a former religious denomination.

Methodist Episcopal Church, South or Methodist Episcopal Church South may also refer to:

- Methodist Episcopal Church, South (Daphne, Alabama), listed on the National Register of Historic Places (NRHP) in Baldwin County
- Methodist Episcopal Church, South (Bald Knob, Arkansas), NRHP-listed in White County
- Methodist Episcopal Church, South (Dardanelle, Arkansas), NRHP-listed in Yell County
- Methodist Episcopal Church, South (Paris, Arkansas), NRHP-listed in Logan County
- Methodist Episcopal Church South (Greenup, Kentucky), NRHP-listed in Greenup County
- Methodist Episcopal Church South (Mount Sterling, Kentucky)
- Methodist Episcopal Church, South (Prestonsburg, Kentucky)
- Methodist Episcopal Church South (Corvallis, Montana)
- Methodist Episcopal Church, South (Checotah, Oklahoma), NRHP-listed in McIntosh County
- Methodist Episcopal Church, South (Lawton, Oklahoma), NRHP-listed in Comanche County
- Methodist Episcopal Church South (Albany, Oregon), NRHP-listed in Linn County
- Methodist Episcopal Church South (Roseburg, Oregon), NRHP-listed in Douglas County

== See also ==
- Methodist Episcopal Church (disambiguation)
