= The Texas =

The Texas may refer to:

- The Texas (Daphne, Alabama), listed on the National Register of Historic Places in Baldwin County, Alabama
- The Texas (locomotive), listed on the National Register of Historic Places in Fulton County, Georgia
