= Nelson House (Latham, Alabama) =

Historic house in Alabama, United States

- U.S. National Register of Historic Places
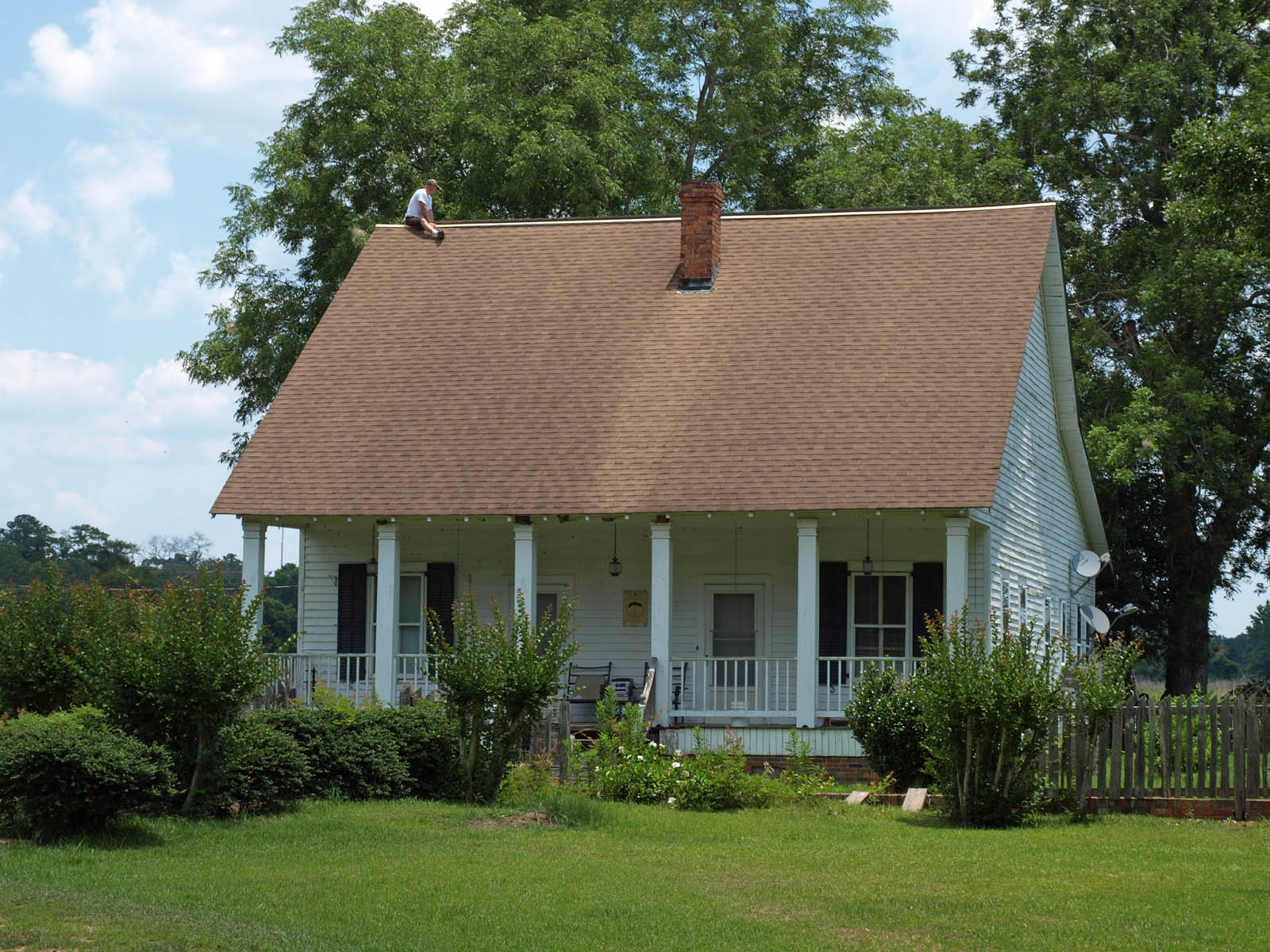
- (2013)

- Location within Alabama
- Location: East side of Hwy. 59 North; Latham, Alabama
- Coordinates: 31°05′08″N 87°49′52″W
- Area: 56 acres (23 ha)
- Built: 1912
- Architectural style: Creole Cottage
- MPS: Creole and Gulf Coast Cottages in Baldwin County TR
- NRHP reference No.: 88002814
- Added to NRHP: December 20, 1988

The Nelson House, also known as the Reynolds House, is a historic house located in Latham, Alabama, United States. It is listed on the National Register of Historic Places (NRHP). Its 1988 NRHP nomination asserted it is locally significant as the "purest example" of the Creole Cottage style of architecture in Baldwin County.

== Description and history ==
Built in 1912, the Nelson House is a one-story frame, four bay house resting on a brick wall foundation. There are two interior chimneys on its gabled roof, one on the front slope and one on the rear slope, each with back-to-back fireplaces. A recessed front porch covers the full facade. The expansive gable ends are a clue to the original builder providing room for a half story which was never added.

In 1899, Edward G. Nelson and his Maryland-native wife left their home in Bay Minette in order to escape yellow fever. They settled in Latham and Nelson ran a sawmill, gristmill, blacksmith shop and bakery in order to support his family, as well as farming and raising a multitude of animals. Nelson’s plot contained five tenant houses and a commissary. His second son, Earl, built a house on a separate plot with lumber from his father’s mill- his mother, Nelson’s wife, requested a second story to the house, which was included in the blueprints but never executed. Earl and his wife moved out of the main house in 1925 and handed it down to his sister, Mary Elizabeth, and her husband Maynard Coghlan. The couple rented the house out for 12 years before moving themselves into the house in 1937. Mary was appointed postmistress of Latham in 1942 and had a small post office erected on her property, while Maynard worked in the Mobile shipyards during World War II. The property was passed down to their daughter Ruth and her husband Forrest J. Reynolds in 1972 and was still owned by Ruth (under "Mrs. F.J. Reynolds") as of 1988.

It was added to the National Register of Historic Places on December 20, 1988.

== See also ==
- National Register of Historic Places listings in Baldwin County, Alabama
