= Stockton Methodist Church =

Historic church in Alabama, United States

- U.S. National Register of Historic Places
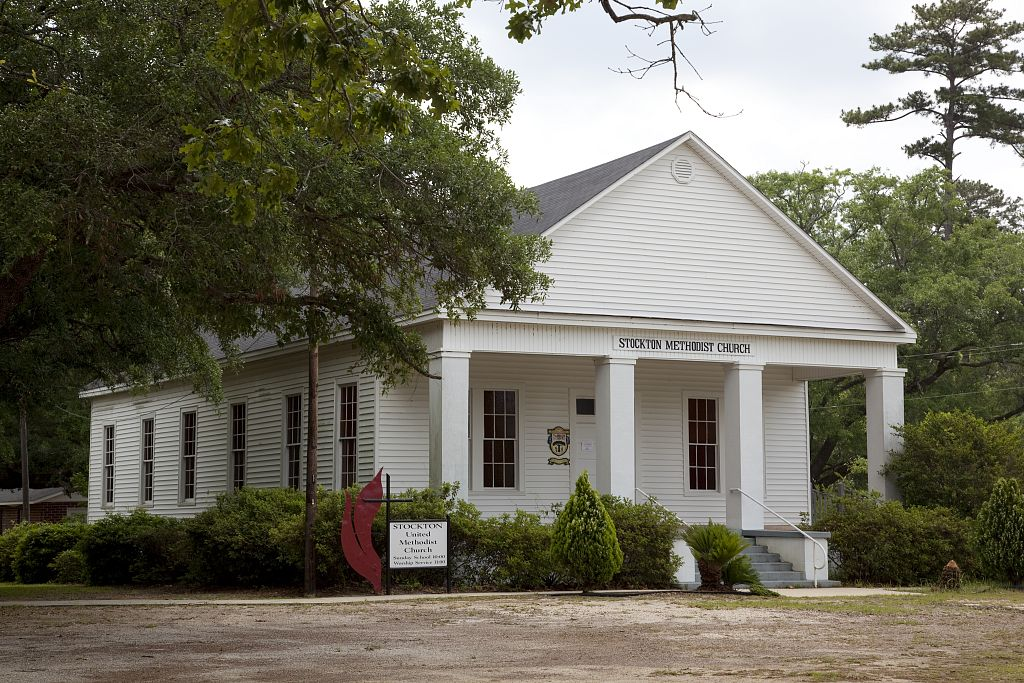

- Location within Alabama Location within the United States
- Location: E side Hwy. 59, Stockton, Alabama
- Coordinates: 31°0′57″N 87°51′11″W
- Area: 2.3 acres (0.93 ha)
- Built: 1929
- Architect: Helton, A.J.
- Architectural style: Classical Revival
- MPS: Rural Churches of Baldwin County TR
- NRHP reference No.: 88001356
- Added to NRHP: August 25, 1988

Stockton Methodist Church is a historic church on the east side of Hwy. 59 in Stockton, Alabama, United States. It was built in 1929 and added to the National Register of Historic Places in 1988.
