= Street House =

Historic house in Alabama, United States

- U.S. National Register of Historic Places
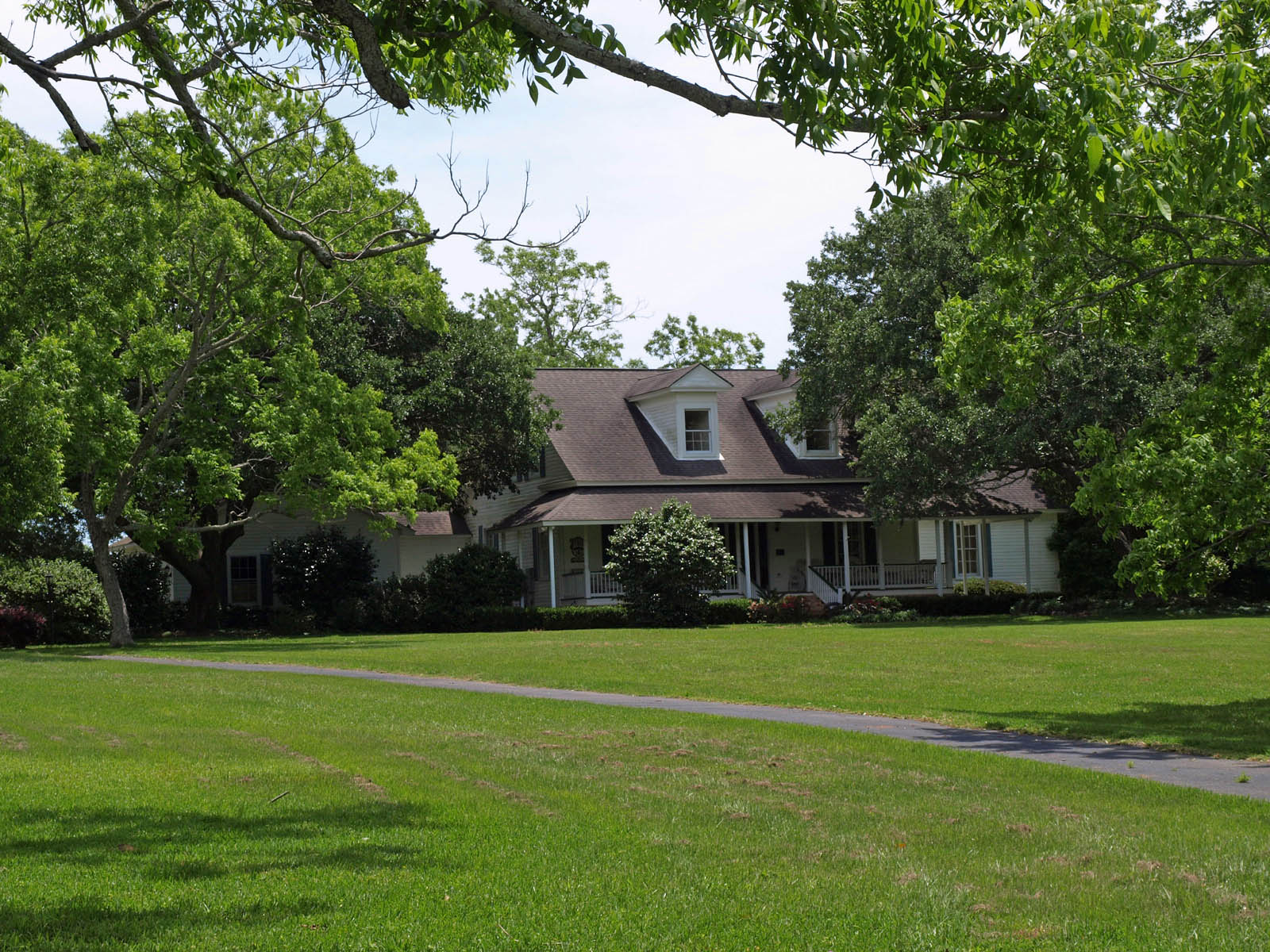
- Street House in 2013

- Location within Alabama Location within the United States
- Location: Wood Acres Rd. off CR 3, Point Clear, Alabama
- Coordinates: 30°27′52″N 87°53′54″W
- Area: 4.5 acres (1.8 ha)
- Built: 1906
- Architectural style: Gulf Coast Cottage
- MPS: Creole and Gulf Coast Cottages in Baldwin County TR
- NRHP reference No.: 88002816
- Added to NRHP: December 20, 1988

The Street House is a historic cottage in Point Clear, Alabama, U.S.. It was built in 1906 for William Street. The house has remained in the family; by the 1980s, it belonged to H. Vaughn Street III. It has been listed on the National Register of Historic Places since December 20, 1988.

After his home on the Weeks Bay estuary was destroyed by a hurricane in 1906, farmer William Street moved his wife and children to Point Clear and built their house shortly after. William’s sons, Charles and Luther, aided their father in his farming activities until he died shortly after 1906. The family continued to reside on the land and Charles married in the late 1920s. The house was passed down through the generations and, despite being vacant from 1960–85, was renovated in 1984.
