= St. Patrick's Catholic Church (Loxley, Alabama) =

Historic church in Alabama, United States

- U.S. National Register of Historic Places
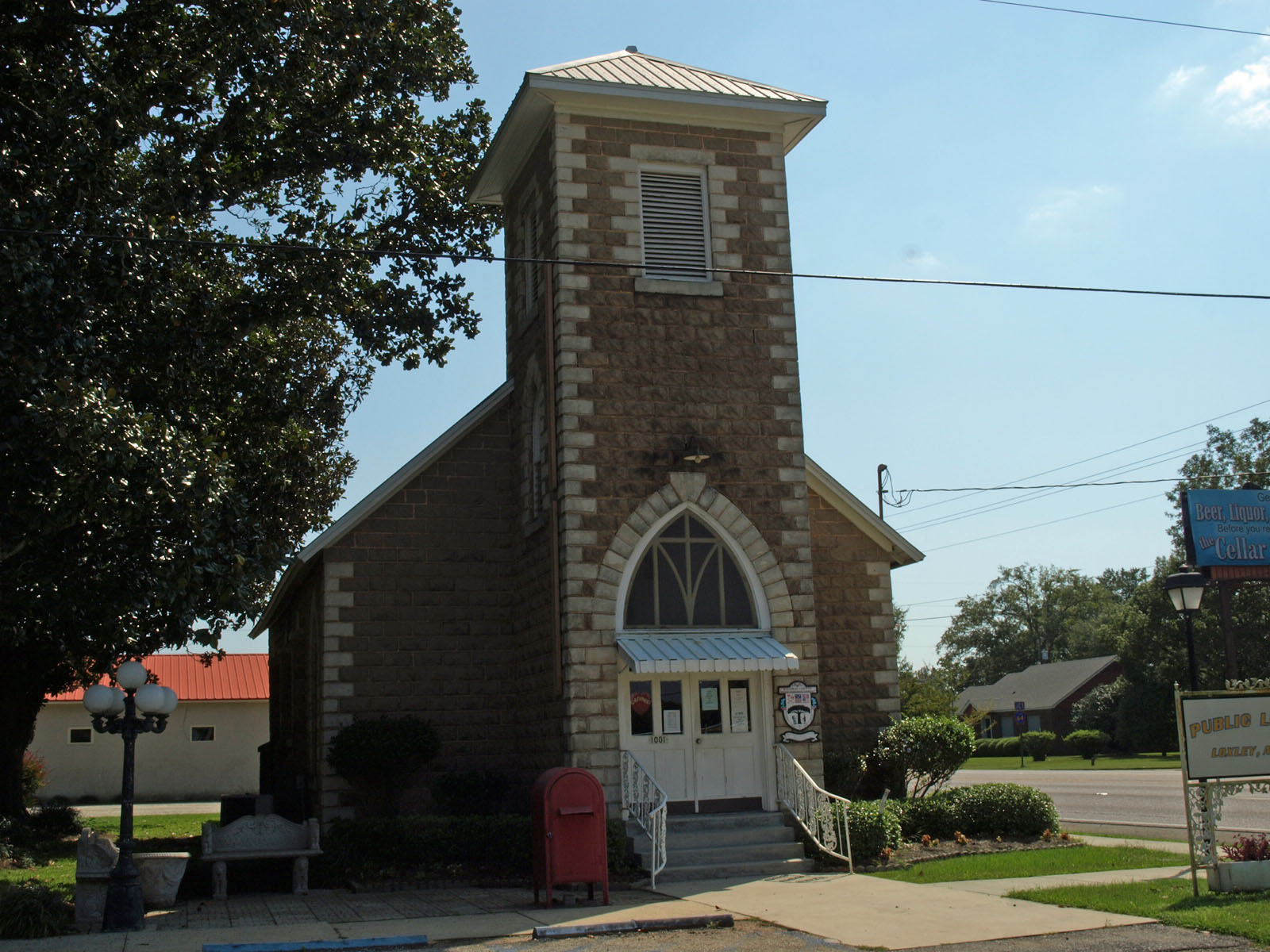

- Location within Alabama Location within the United States
- Location: E side Hwy. 90, Loxley, Alabama
- Coordinates: 30°37′11″N 87°45′10″W
- Area: 0.3 acres (0.12 ha)
- Built: 1924
- MPS: Rural Churches of Baldwin County TR
- NRHP reference No.: 88001354
- Added to NRHP: August 25, 1988

St. Patrick's Catholic Church is a historic Roman Catholic church on the east side of Hwy. 90 in Loxley, Alabama, United States. It was built in 1924 and added to the National Register of Historic Places in 1988. The Loxley Public Library currently occupies the building.

Originally dedicated to Saint Raphael, it was one of four small mission churches in central Baldwin County built to serve Catholic immigrant workers, many from the Midwest. In 1974, St. Raphael, St. Gabriel in Summerdale, St. Matthew in Elsanor, and Infant Jesus of Prague in Silverhill were closed and the congregations merged into the new parish of St. Patrick, which is located centrally in Robertsdale, AL.
