= People's Supply Company =

- U.S. National Register of Historic Places
- Alabama Register of Landmarks and Heritage
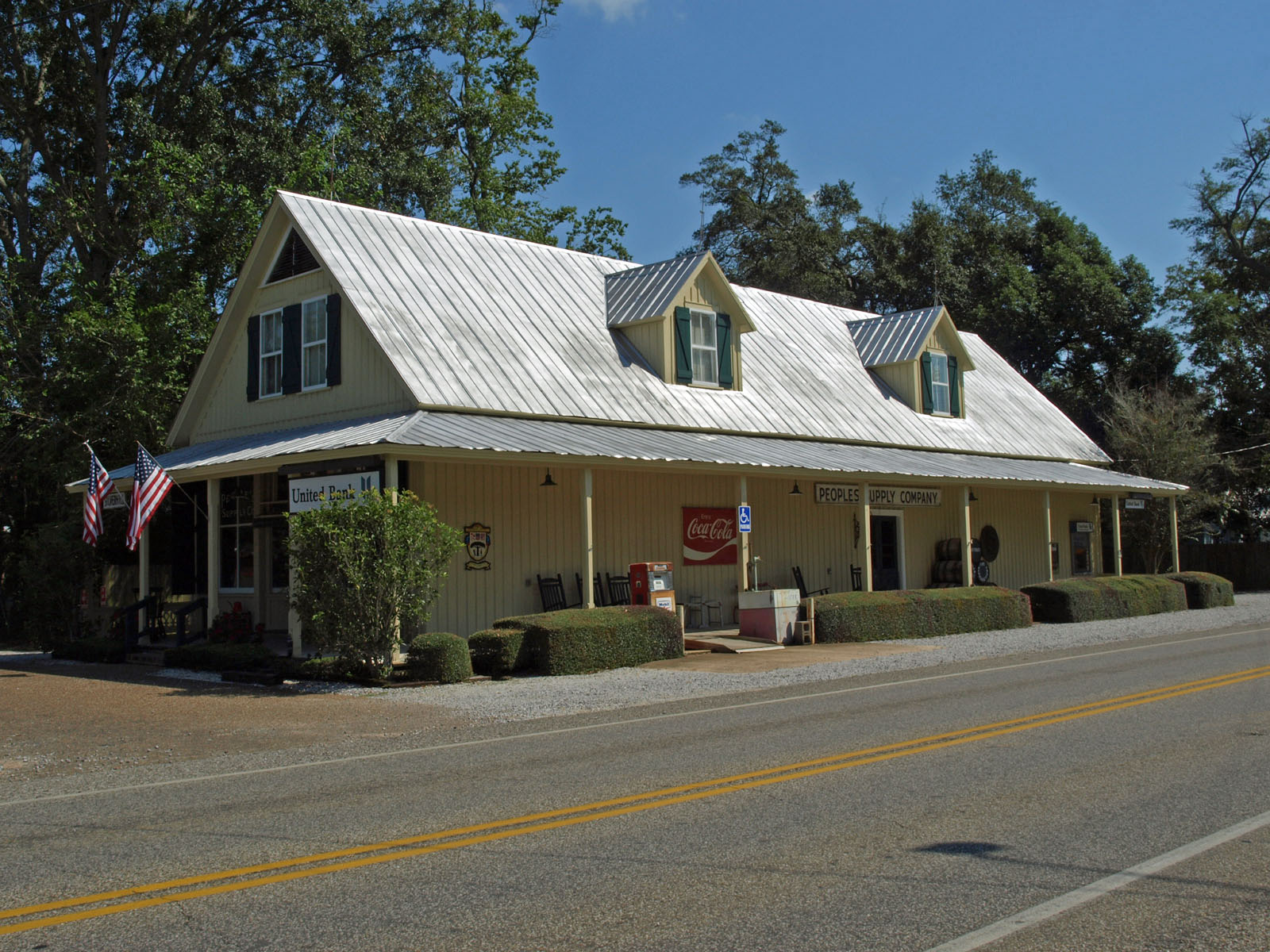
- Location: 21950 Broad Street, Silverhill, Alabama, U.S.
- Coordinates: 30°32′41″N 87°45′03″W
- Built: 1902
- Architect: Theodore A. Johnson
- Architectural style: Gablefront
- NRHP reference No.: 97000096

Significant dates
- Added to NRHP: February 21, 1997
- Designated ARLH: March 13, 1996

People's Supply Company is a historic general store and building in Silverhill, Alabama, U.S. It is located on the southeast corner of the intersection of Alabama State Route 104 and Broad Street (also known Baldwin County Road 55). The People's Supply Company was the only source of supply for dry goods and agricultural needs in the community starting in the early 20th-century.

The building is no longer open to the public. It is listed on the National Register of Historic Places since February 21, 1997, for its architecture and history of local commerce; and is listed on the Alabama Register of Landmarks and Heritage since March 13, 1996.

== History ==
The People's Supply Company of Silverhill opened in June 1902, and was built and operated by Theodore A. Johnson. Johnson had been a grocery in Paxton, Illinois, before moving to Alabama. He was of no relations to Oscar Johnson, a city founder. The land was purchased by Theodore Johnson in September 1901 from Hanna and Carl Carlson of Chicago. The Carlsons had bought the land from the Svea Land Company a few years prior. Johnson would own and operate the store from 1902 to 1928, and he lived upstairs on the second floor.

In 1928 the store was run by Greek immigrant George Marines, who had also been drawn to the area. In 1947 he would purchase the building. It was then managed for him by Leslie Chandler and his wife, who raised their two children upstairs. The Chandlers would run the store until 1972.

Starting in the 1980s, the business struggled, in part due to large stores opening nearby. The building had many owners between 1972 until 1993, and it stood vacant for several years before its purchase by Joe Spalding and his wife in 1993. They did a major restoration effort, and reopened the building to the public as an antique and reproduction furniture shop in September 1995.

== See also ==
- National Register of Historic Places listings in Baldwin County, Alabama
