= Hubbard Landing Seaplane Base =

- IATA: none; ICAO: none; FAA LID: HL2

Summary
- Airport type: Public
- Owner: Paul L. Bryars, Jr
- Serves: Stockton, Alabama
- Elevation AMSL: 8 ft (2.4 m)
- Coordinates: 31°03′49″N 087°52′12″W
- Interactive map of Hubbard Landing Seaplane Base

Runways
Direction	Length		Surface
Direction	ft	m	Surface
16W/34W	6,000	1,829	Water
- Source: Federal Aviation Administration

Hubbard Landing Seaplane Base (FAA LID: HL2) is a privately owned public-use seaplane base in Baldwin County, Alabama, United States. It is located five nautical miles (6 mi, 9 km) southeast of the central business district of Stockton, Alabama.

== Facilities ==
Hubbard Landing Seaplane Base has one seaplane landing area designated 16W/34W which measures 6,000 by 300 feet (1,829 x 91 m).

== See also ==
- List of airports in Alabama
