= Battles Wharf Historic District =

Historic district in Alabama, United States

- U.S. National Register of Historic Places
- U.S. Historic district
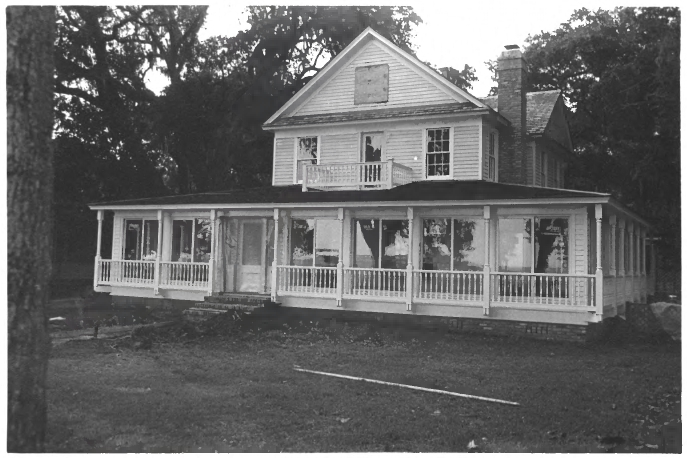

- Location within Alabama Location within the United States
- Location: US 98, Eastern Shore Blvd. roughly between Woolworth Ave. and Buerger La., Battles Wharf, Alabama
- Coordinates: 30.49376°N 87.92704°W
- Area: 34 acres (14 ha)
- Architectural style: Late Victorian
- NRHP reference No.: 88000107
- Added to NRHP: April 28, 1988

The Battles Wharf Historic District comprises a portion of Battles Wharf, Alabama, United States, between Mobile Bay and U.S. Route 98. The area, also called Battles, is a narrow stretch of bayfront with long, deep lots accessible by shell-paved lanes. Houses in the area date from about 1842 to the present day, and are in a distinctive wood-frame cottage style with tall windows and broad porches. Many houses feature so-called "rain porches," deep shed-roofed screened porches attached to the main house and elevated on short masonry piers. The district includes 14 contributing structures and two non-contributing structures. The properties are linked by a public footpath that serves as a thoroughfare. The district has principally functioned as a summer retreat for residents of Mobile, Alabama.

The area was originally called Dadeville after the Robert Dade family who settled there in 1849. A resort hotel had been established in 1822 at Point Clear and the high shoreline overlooking Mobile Bay became a popular retreat. Several hotels were built in the 19th century. By the early 20th century the area had a school, a post office, an orphanage, several churches and two hotels. At about this time it became known as Battles, after the Battles family bought much of the property. The area declined from 1927 after a causeway was built across the bay to Mobile, taking traffic from the community.

Battles Wharf was placed on the National Register of Historic Places on April 28, 1988.

== List of structures ==
The historical district features 14 contributing structures and 2 non-contributing structures. Structures are not listed in any particular order.

- Lot 35; built c. 1900, single-story shingled cottage.
- Lot 34; built c. 1900, one and a half-story clapboarded cottage.
- Lot 25; built c. 1900, one and a half-story clapboarded cottage.
- W.B. Curran House (Lot 23); built 1905.
- Lot 22; built 1898.
- Aaron Moog House (Lot 17); built 1888, Victorian cottage.
- Lot 18; built c. 1900
- Joe Norville House (Lot 14); built 1842, c. 1895.
- Lot 13; built c. 1845
- Lot 12; built 1895.
- Lot 11; built 1895.
- Lot 10; built 1901.
- Lot 7; built c. 1890.
- Lot 6; built c. 1925.

=== Non-contributing structures ===
- Lot 8; built c. 1945.
- Lot 9; built c. 1980.
