= Methodist Episcopal Church (Bozeman, Montana) =

Historic church in Montana, United States

- U.S. National Register of Historic Places
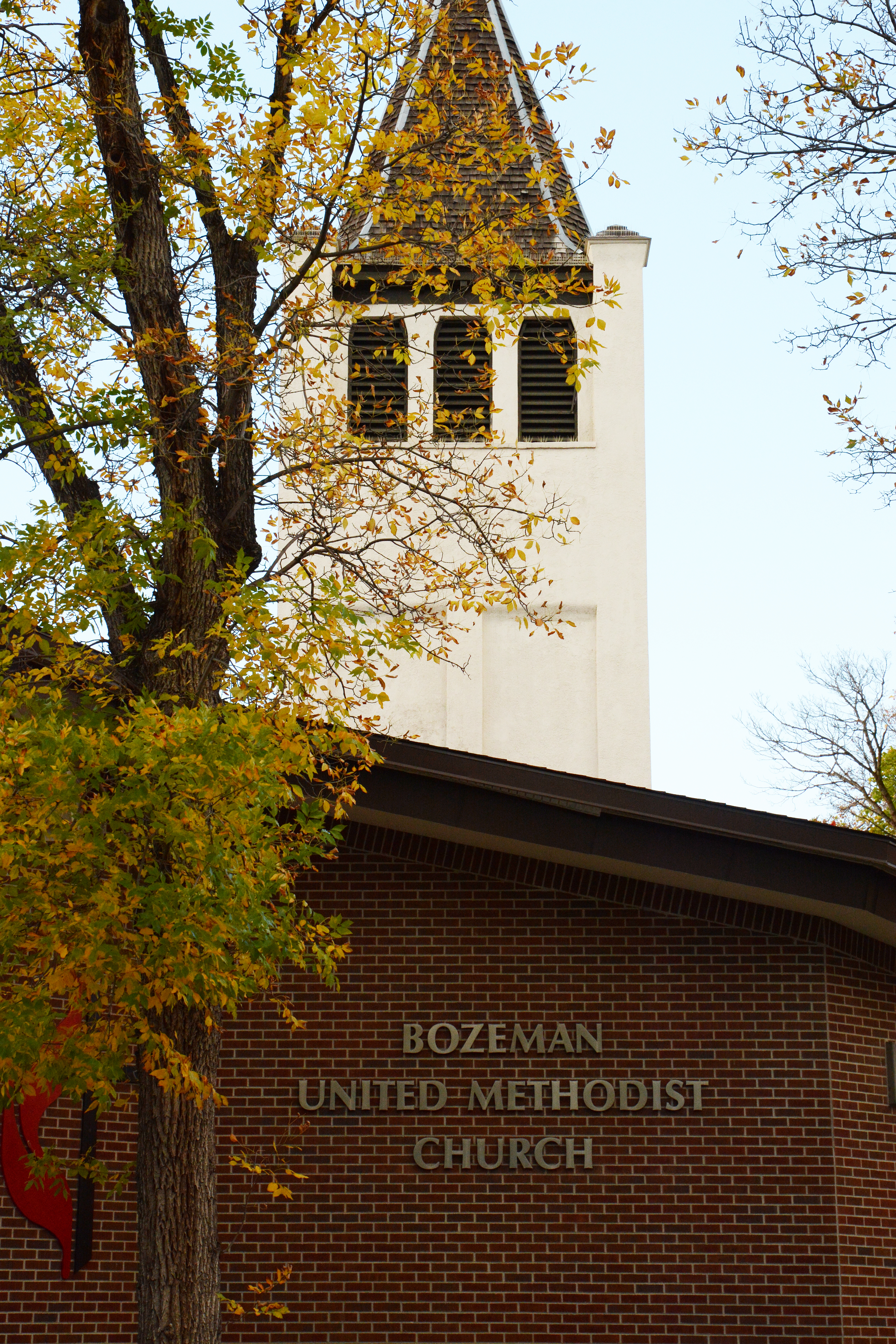
- Photo shows historic steeple behind 1950s red brickwork

- Location within Montana Location within the United States
- Location: 121 S. Willson, Bozeman, Montana
- Coordinates: 45°40′41″N 111°02′19″W
- Area: less than one acre
- Built: 1873
- Architectural style: Gothic Revival
- MPS: Bozeman MRA
- NRHP reference No.: 87001839
- Added to NRHP: October 23, 1987

The Methodist Episcopal Church, at 121 S. Willson in Bozeman, Montana, was built in 1873. It was listed on the National Register of Historic Places in 1987.

Its original Gothic Revival section was started in 1883 during a brief 1882-83 period of prosperity of Bozeman, and was completed in 1884, making it the oldest existing Methodist Church in the state of Montana.

The church was organized by A.M. Hough of Virginia City, Montana in 1866. Before that there had been a Sunday school in a log house on Bozeman's Main Street in 1865. The church then built, in 1866, was the first frame building in town, and was 24 by 36 feet (7.3 m × 11.0 m) in plan, and had a sawdust floor. In 1869 it acquired the first bell in town.

Bricks were manufactured by W.H. Tracy. There was a freestanding bell tower behind the church. In 1905 a three-story square belltower with a pyramidal roof surmounted by a decorative finial was added. In 1905-06 a two-story flat-roofed addition was added. A further addition of a one-story flat-roofed brick section for offices was added much later, probably during remodelling in the 1950s, which also covered the original brick building with stucco.

Presumably it belongs to the United Methodist Church denomination.
