= Methodist Episcopal Church South (Greenup, Kentucky) =

Historic church in Kentucky, United States

- U.S. National Register of Historic Places
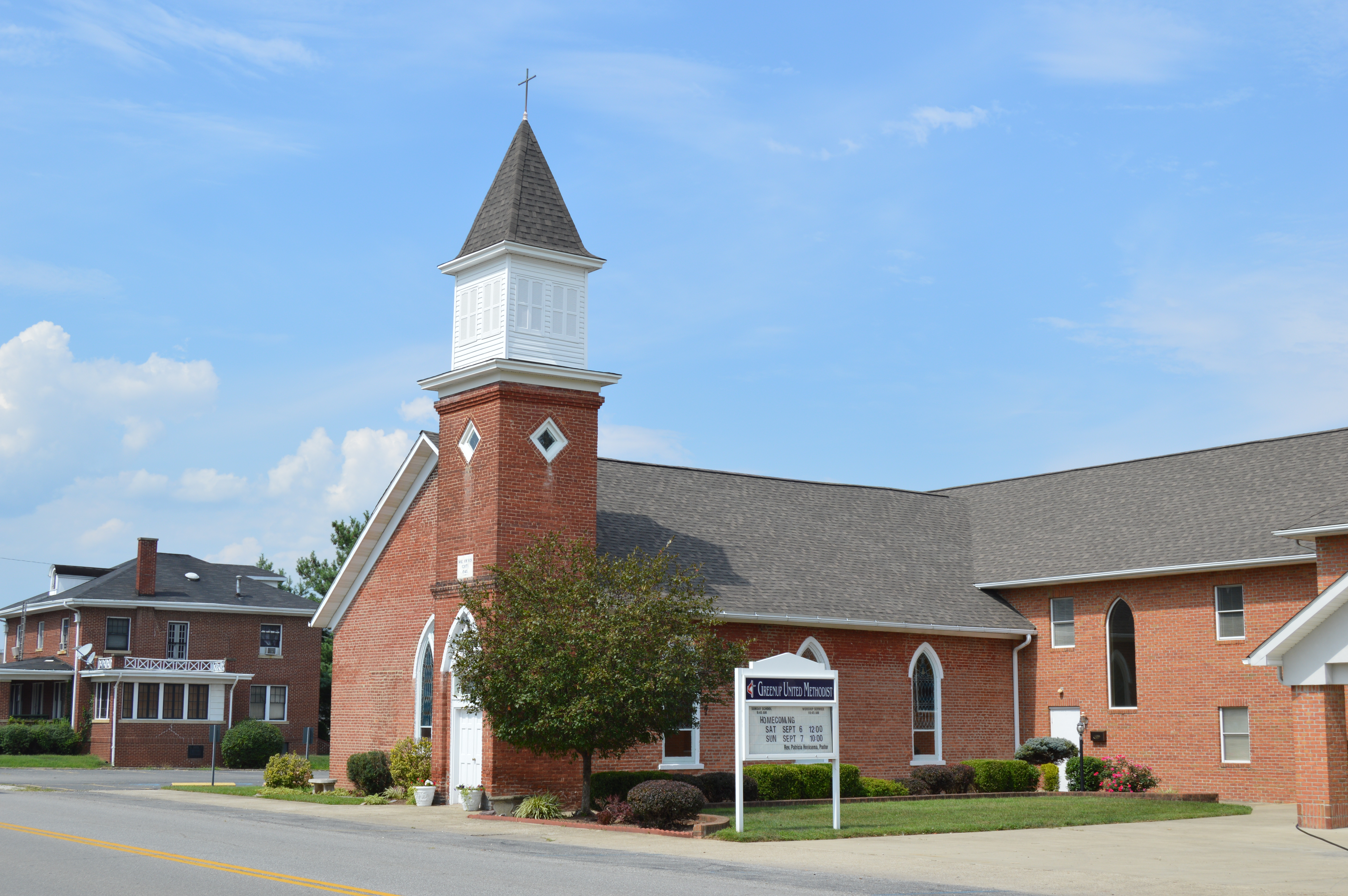
- Front and eastern side

- Location within Kentucky Location within the United States
- Location: Main St., Greenup, Kentucky
- Coordinates: 38°34′36″N 82°50′4″W
- Area: 0.2 acres (0.081 ha)
- Built: 1845
- Architectural style: Greek Revival, Gothic Revival
- MPS: Greenup MRA
- NRHP reference No.: 87002444
- Added to NRHP: January 27, 1988

The Methodist Episcopal Church South in Greenup, Kentucky, is a historic church on Greenup's Main Street. It was built in 1845 and added to the National Register of Historic Places in 1988.

It was deemed notable "as good example of the sensitivity of the church congregation to the changing national [architectural] styles. A Greek Revival church building was updated in the 1870s to the Gothic Revival style."

The church was built in 1845. It was modified in 1876, including by the addition of a square bell tower.
