= Miflin, Alabama =

Unincorporated community in Alabama, United States

- Unincorporated community
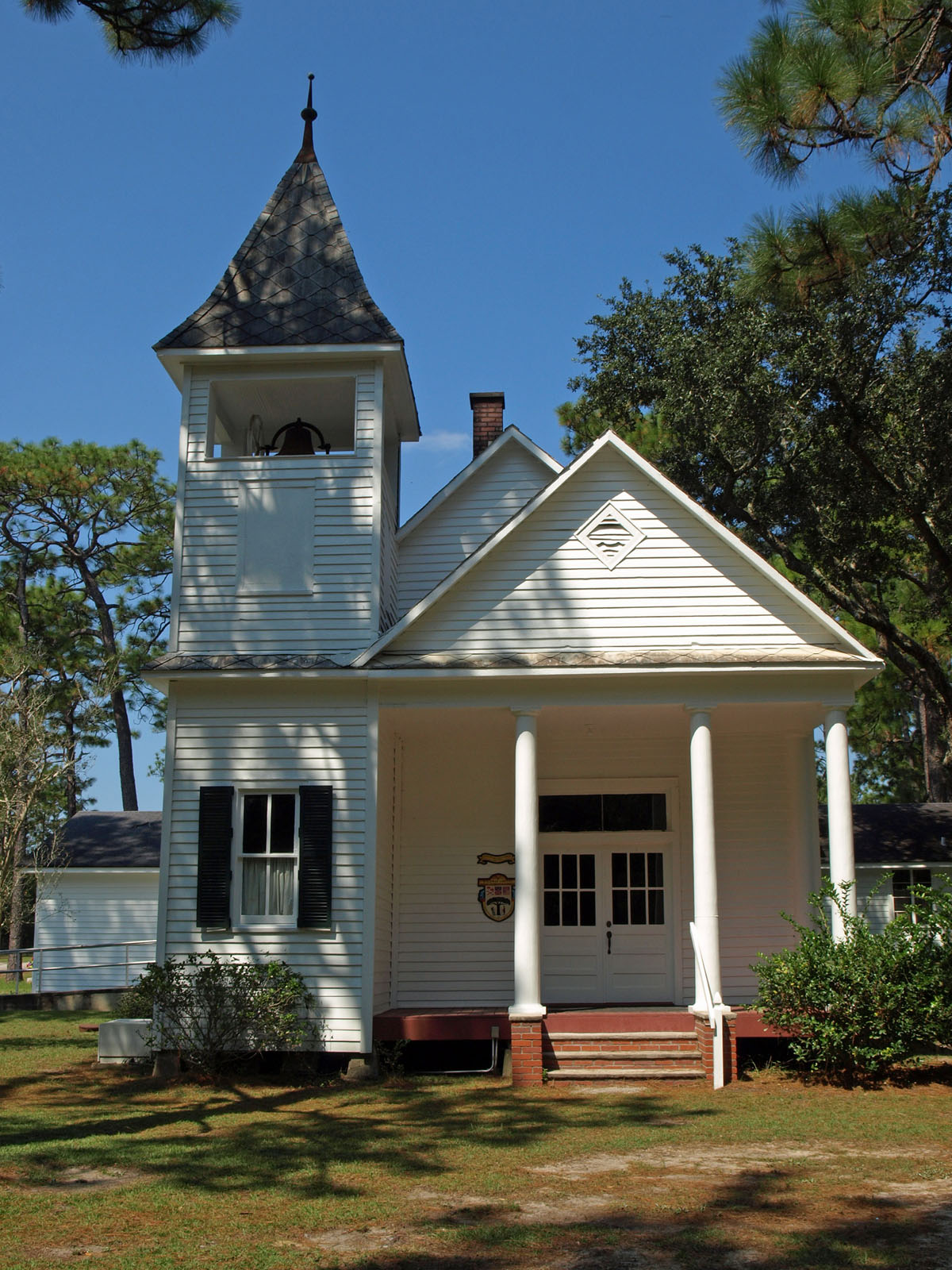
- Swift Presbyterian Church

- Location within Alabama Location within the United States
- Coordinates: 30°22′14″N 87°36′39″W
- Country: United States
- State: Alabama
- County: Baldwin
- Elevation: 36 ft (11 m)
- Time zone: UTC-6 (Central (CST))
  - Summer (DST): UTC-5 (CDT)
- Area code: 251
- GNIS feature ID: 122716

Miflin is an unincorporated community in Baldwin County, Alabama, United States. Miflin is located along County Route 20 (Miflin Road) 5 miles (8.0 km) east-southeast of Foley. The Swift Presbyterian Church, which is listed on the National Register of Historic Places, is located in Miflin. A post office operated under the name Miflin from 1907 to 1951. The community is likely named after the Miflin family, who owned land in the area.
