= Twin Beach AME Church =

Historic church in Alabama, United States

- Twin Beech AME Zion Church
- U.S. National Register of Historic Places
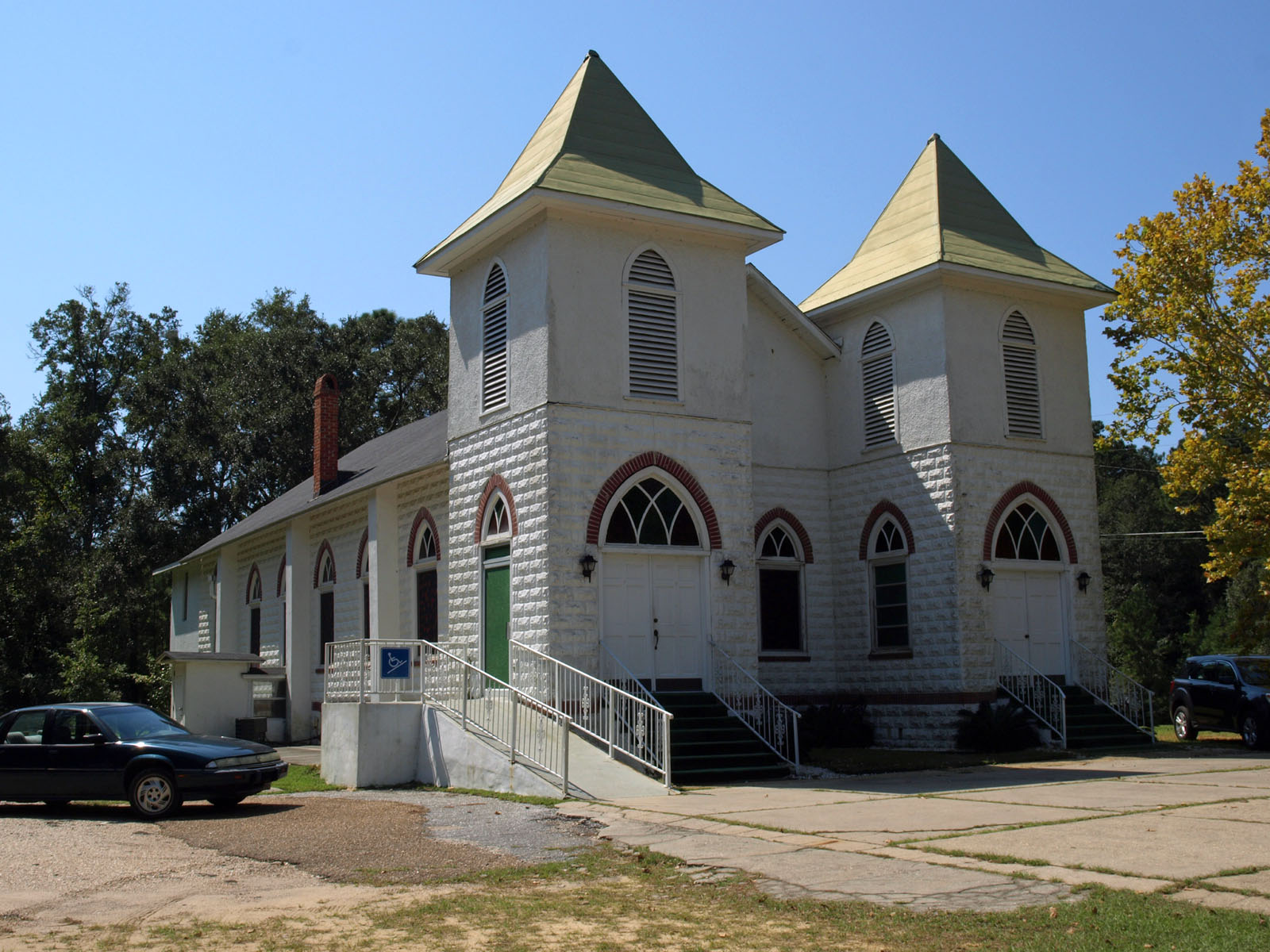

- Location within Alabama Location within the United States
- Location: S side of CR 44, Fairhope, Alabama
- Coordinates: 30°30′4″N 87°54′34″W
- Area: 2.8 acres (1.1 ha)
- Built: 1925
- Architect: Johnson, Axal
- MPS: Rural Churches of Baldwin County TR
- NRHP reference No.: 88001358
- Added to NRHP: August 25, 1988

Twin Beech AME Zion Church, listed as Twin Beach AME Church, is a historic African Methodist Episcopal church on the south side of CR 44 in Fairhope, Alabama, United States. It was built in 1925 and added to the National Register of Historic Places in 1988.
