= Lebanon Chapel AME Church =

Historic church in Alabama, United States

- U.S. National Register of Historic Places
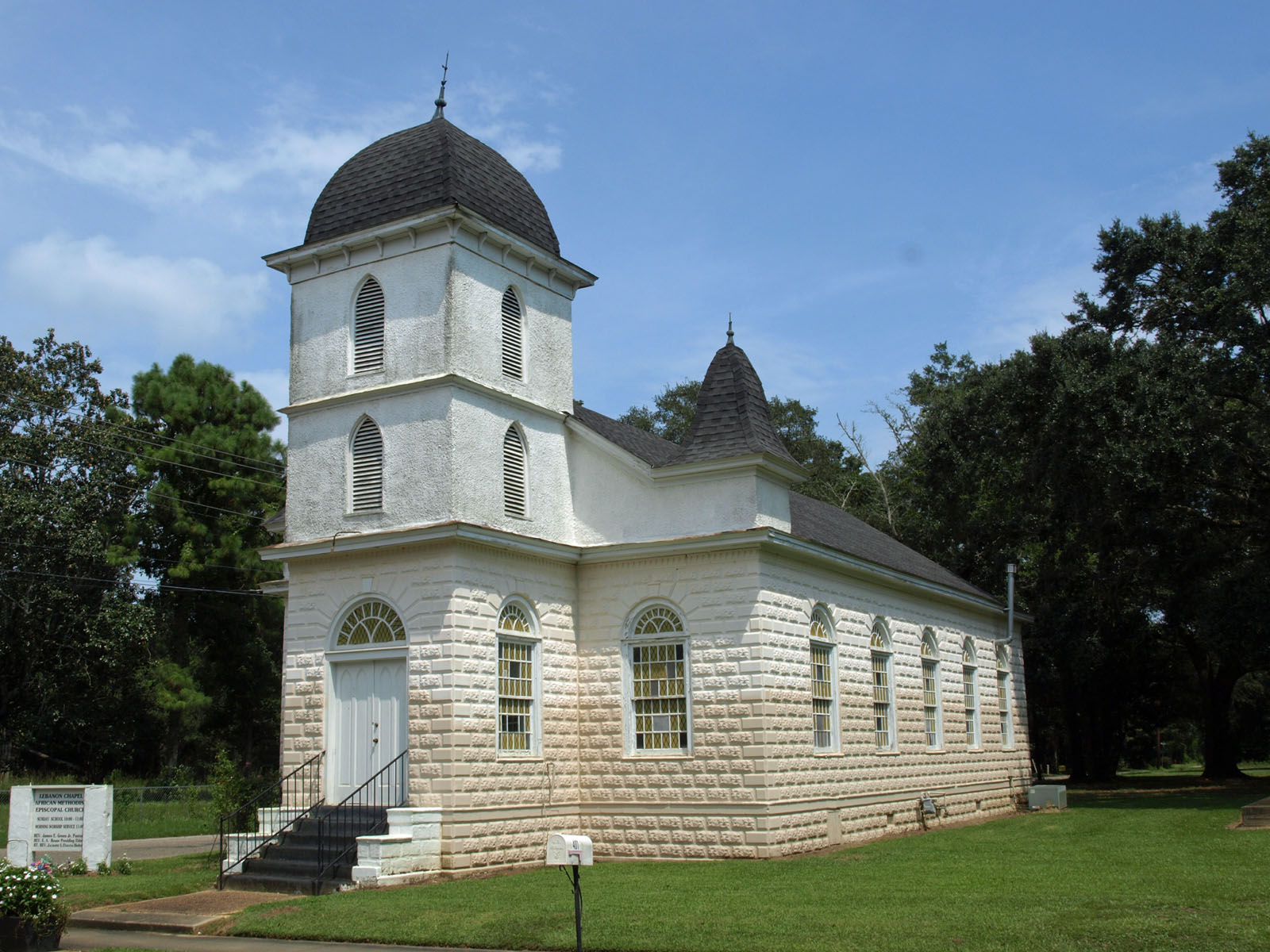

- Location within Alabama Location within the United States
- Location: Bounded by Young St. on the West and Middle St. on the North, Fairhope, Alabama
- Coordinates: 30°30′48″N 87°53′39″W
- Area: 1.5 acres (0.61 ha)
- Built: 1923
- Built by: Warren B. Pearson
- MPS: Rural Churches of Baldwin County TR
- NRHP reference No.: 88001351
- Added to NRHP: August 25, 1988

Lebanon Chapel AME Church is a historic African Methodist Episcopal church bounded by Young Street on the West and Middle Street on the North in Fairhope, Alabama, United States. It was built in 1923, and added to the National Register of Historic Places in 1988.
