= Methodist Episcopal Church (Orleans, New York) =

Historic church in New York, United States

- U.S. National Register of Historic Places
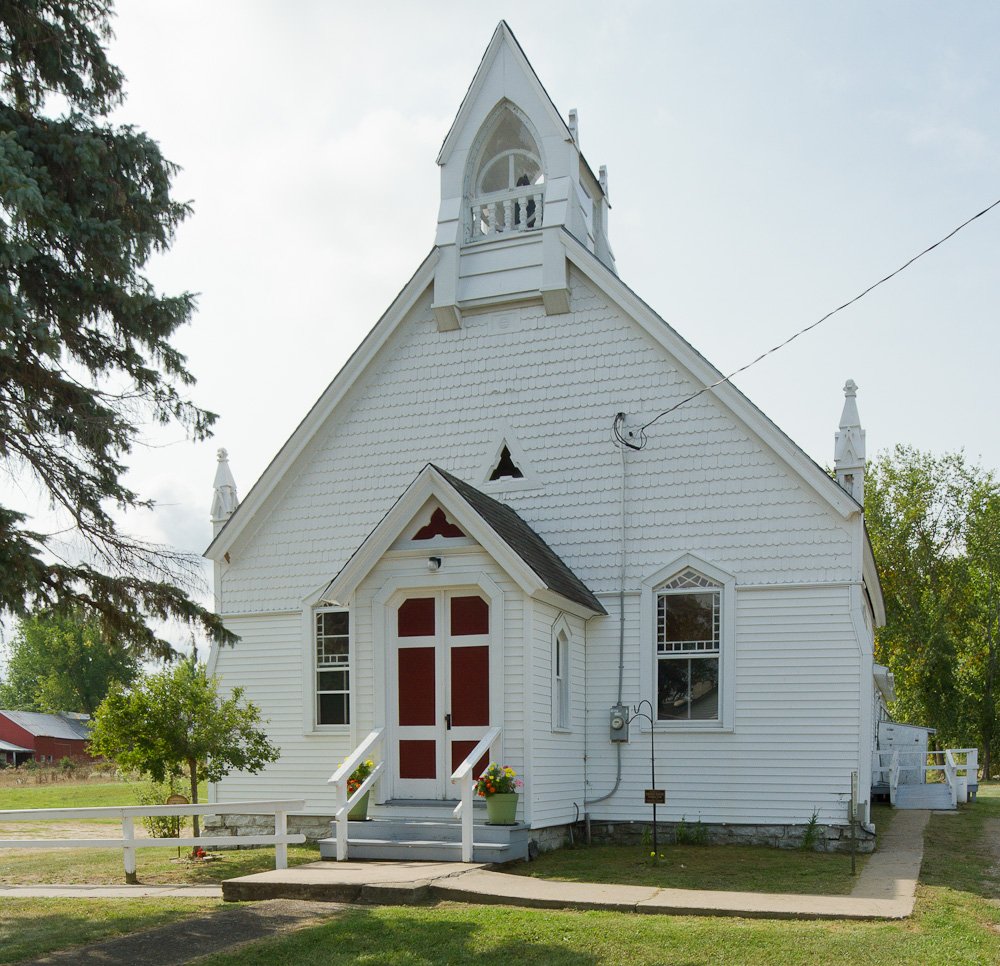

- Location within New York Location within the United States
- Location: S side of NY 180, W of jct. with Gore Rd., Hamlet of Omar, Orleans, New York
- Coordinates: 44°15′43″N 75°58′35″W
- Area: less than one acre
- Built: 1892
- Architectural style: Late Gothic Revival
- MPS: Orleans MPS
- NRHP reference No.: 96000663
- Added to NRHP: June 28, 1996

Methodist Episcopal Church, also known as Omar-Fisher's Landing United Methodist Church, is a historic United Methodist church located at Orleans in Jefferson County, New York. It was built in 1892 and is a modest 1 1/2-story, wood-frame vernacular Gothic Revival structure. It features an open square belfry with Gothic detailing.

It was listed on the National Register of Historic Places in 1996.
