= The Texas (Daphne, Alabama) =

- U.S. National Register of Historic Places
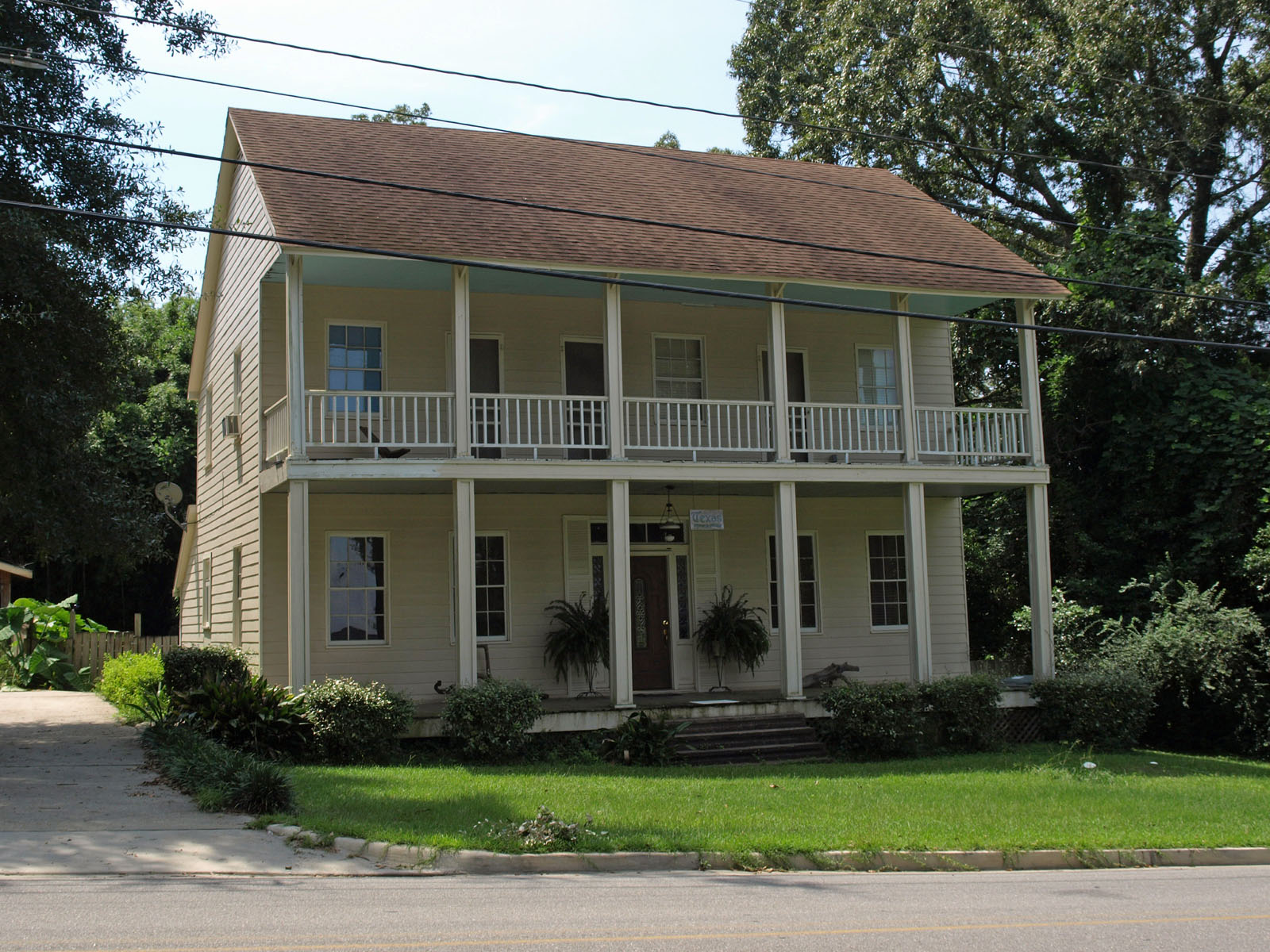
- The Texas in 2012

- Location within Alabama Location within the United States
- Location: 306 Dryer Avenue, Daphne, Alabama
- Coordinates: 30°36′2″N 87°54′37″W
- Area: 1 acre (0.40 ha)
- Built: 1835
- Architectural style: Gulf Coast Cottage
- MPS: Creole and Gulf Coast Cottages in Baldwin County TR
- NRHP reference No.: 88002817
- Added to NRHP: December 20, 1988

The Texas is a historic house in Daphne, Alabama, U.S.. It was built as a hotel by William L. Howard in 1835. In 1894, it was purchased by William Dryer. It has been listed on the National Register of Historic Places since December 20, 1998.
