= Brodbeck–Zundel Historic District =

Historic district in Baldwin County, Alabama

- U.S. National Register of Historic Places
- U.S. Historic district
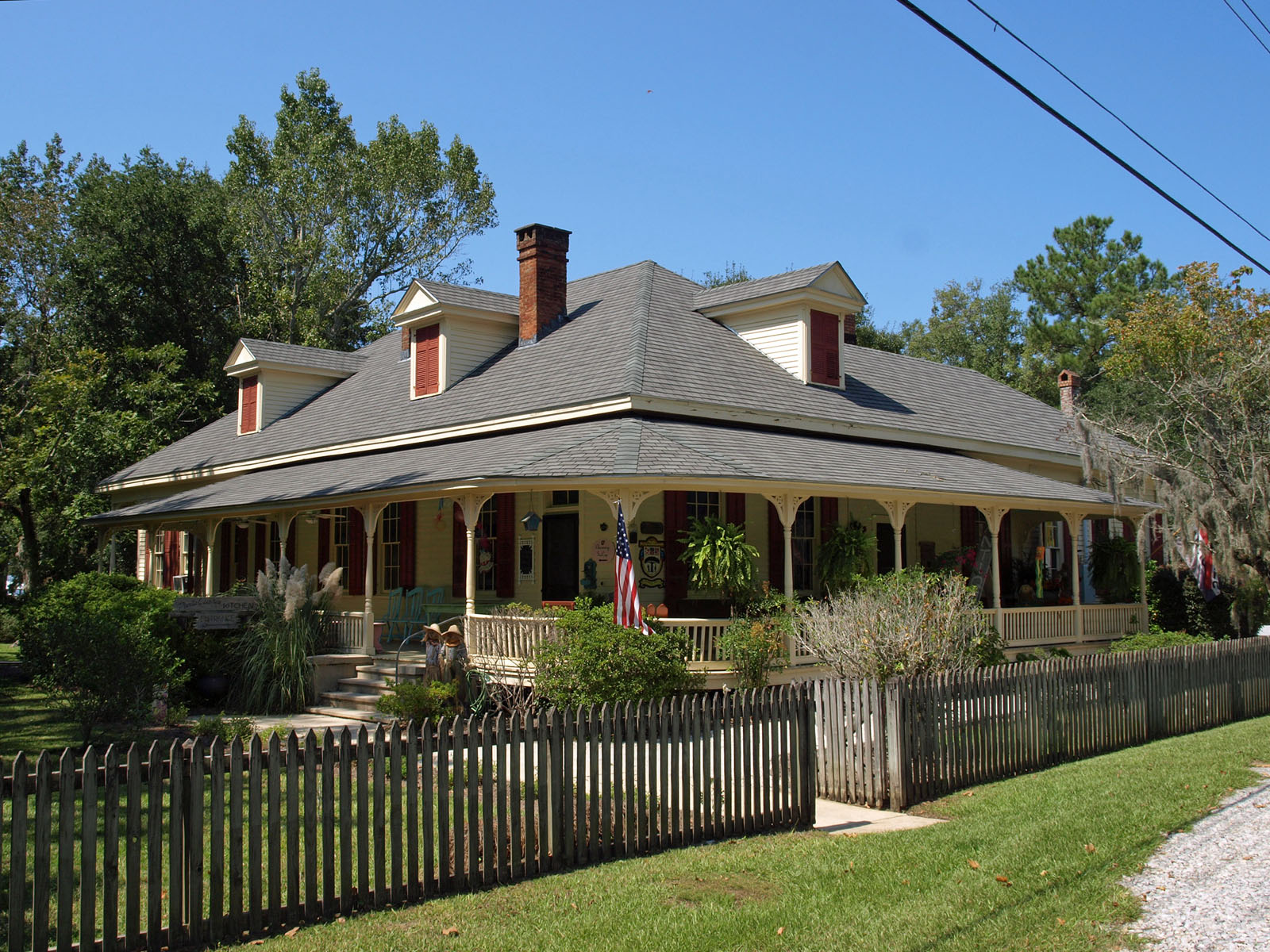
- The Brodbeck House in September 2012

- Location within Alabama Location within the United States
- Location: Scenic U.S. Route 98 and Old Marlow Rd., Point Clear, Alabama
- Coordinates: 30°28′27″N 87°55′09″W
- Built: 1897–1900
- NRHP reference No.: 88000520
- Added to NRHP: April 28, 1988

The Brodbeck–Zundel Historic District is a historic district in Point Clear, Alabama, United States. The district consists of four houses near the eastern shore of Mobile Bay built by an extended family around the turn of the 20th century. Edward Brodbeck, an immigrant from Germany, formed a company with his brother-in-law, Charles F. Zundel, to run a general store, post office, and wharf. After Charles' death in 1896, Brodbeck and his wife took in his nine children, and built a large Victorian house near the general store. Two of Zundel's sons built houses nearby soon after.

The houses were built as year-round residences, unlike the nearby homes which were vacation cottages. As such, they exhibited a more elaborate architectural style, with turned posts, brackets, and finials. The main Brodbeck house originally was oriented west toward the bay, but in 1905 was changed to be oriented towards the road with the addition of a wraparound porch.

The district was listed on the National Register of Historic Places in 1988.
