= Swift Presbyterian Church =

Historic church in Alabama, United States

- U.S. National Register of Historic Places
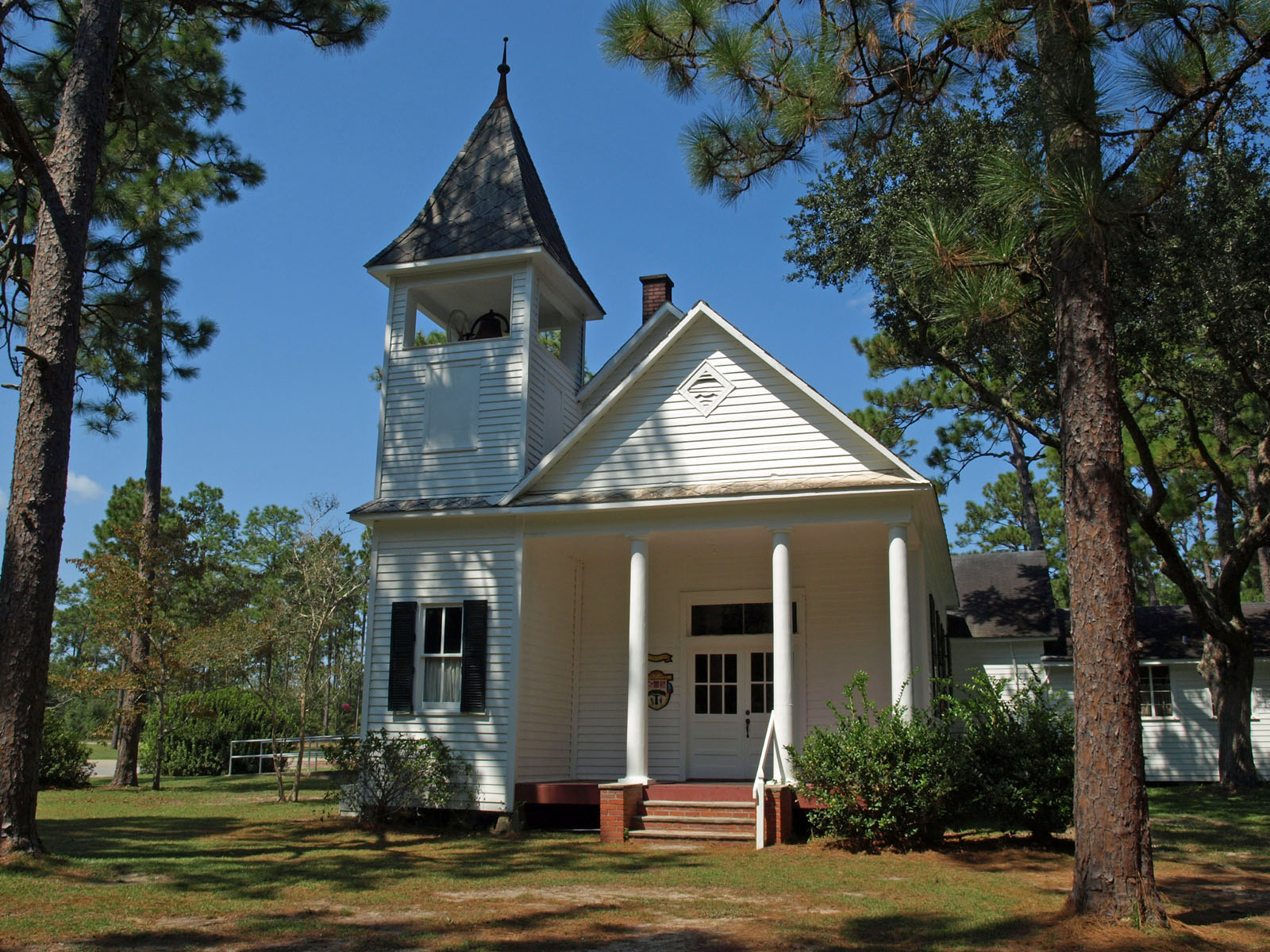

- Location within Alabama Location within the United States
- Location: Swift Church Rd., Miflin, Alabama
- Coordinates: 30°22′31″N 87°37′40″W
- Area: 1.7 acres (0.69 ha)
- Built: 1905
- Architectural style: Late Gothic Revival
- MPS: Rural Churches of Baldwin County TR
- NRHP reference No.: 88001357
- Added to NRHP: August 25, 1988

Swift Presbyterian Church is a historic Presbyterian church on Swift Church Road in Miflin, Alabama, United States. It was built in 1905 and added to the National Register of Historic Places in 1988.

The church began construction in 1905 with materials donated by local lumber merchant and eventual church elder C.A. Swift. The building completed construction in 1907 and the congregation was formally organized in 1910. The church was named in Swift’s honor in 1924.
