= CSS Huntsville and CSS Tuscaloosa Historic and Archaeological District =

Shipwreck site near Mobile, Alabama

- U.S. National Register of Historic Places
- U.S. Historic district
- Location: Mobile River, Alabama
- NRHP reference No.: 100007894
- Added to NRHP: July 18, 2022

The CSS Huntsville and CSS Tuscaloosa Historic and Archaeological District is a shipwreck site in the Mobile River near Mobile, Alabama, United States. The Huntsville and the Tuscaloosa were ironclad warships built in 1863 at the Confederate Naval Works in Selma, Alabama. They were fitted out in Mobile, but due to an unusual hull design, were relegated to being used as floating batteries. The ships were scuttled by retreating Confederates after the capture of Mobile in April 1865 and used as blockships.

The wrecks were discovered in 1985, and in 2019 further surveys determined them as "the most intact examples of Confederate ironclad warships in the nation." The site was listed on the National Register of Historic Places in 2022.
