= Methodist Episcopal Church, South (Bald Knob, Arkansas) =

Historic church in Arkansas, United States

- U.S. National Register of Historic Places
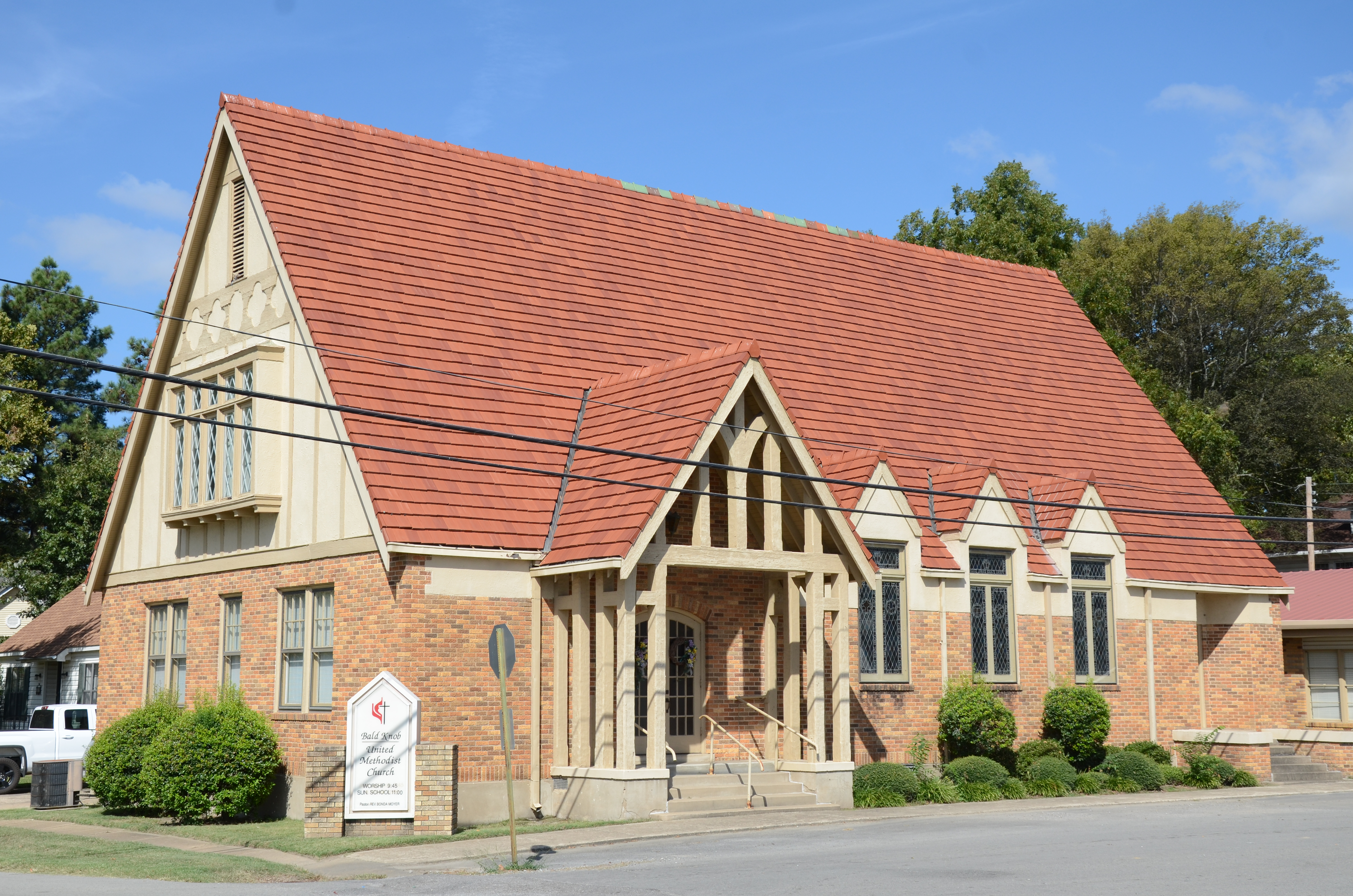

- Location within Arkansas Location within the United States
- Location: Jct. of Main and Center Sts., Bald Knob, Arkansas
- Coordinates: 35°18′40″N 91°34′4″W
- Area: less than one acre
- Built: 1927
- Architectural style: Late Gothic Revival, Tudor Revival
- MPS: White County MPS
- NRHP reference No.: 91001278
- Added to NRHP: July 20, 1992

The First United Methodist Church, once the Methodist Episcopal Church, South, is a historic church at Main and Center Sts. in Bald Knob, Arkansas. It is a single story frame structure, finished in brick, that was built in 1927 with a distinctive blend of Craftsman and Tudor Revival elements. Its gable end is finished in half-timbered stucco, with a projecting bay of diamond-pane windows.

The building was listed on the National Register of Historic Places in 1992.

== See also ==
- National Register of Historic Places listings in White County, Arkansas
