= Beckner House =

- U.S. National Register of Historic Places
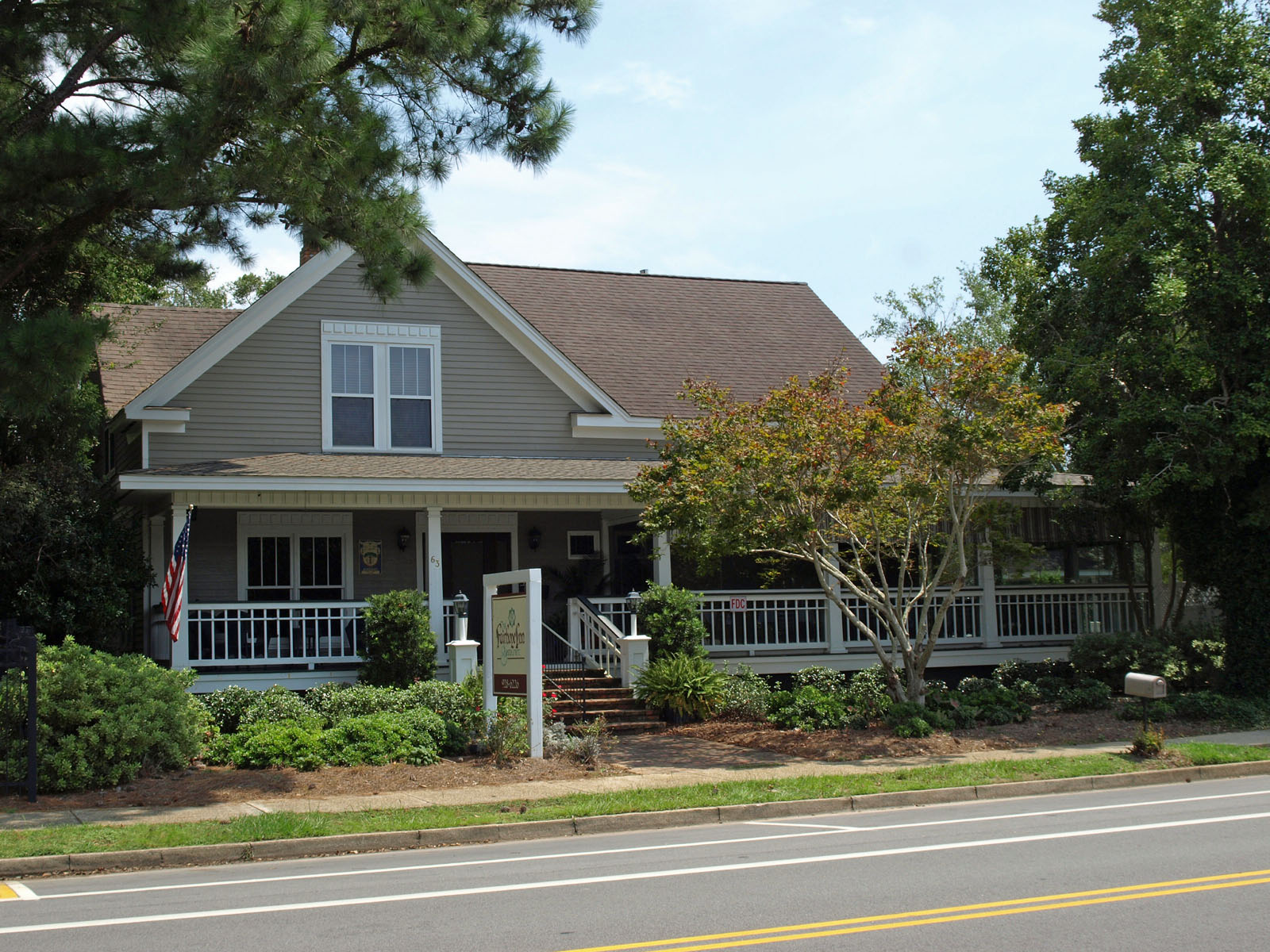
- The house in September 2012

- Location within Alabama Location within the United States
- Location: 63 S. Church St., Fairhope, Alabama
- Coordinates: 30°31′15″N 87°54′17″W
- Built: 1906
- Part of: Fairhope Downtown Historic District (ID04000115)
- NRHP reference No.: 88001007
- Added to NRHP: July 1, 1988

The Beckner House (also known as the Baker House) is a historic residence in Fairhope, Alabama, United States. The house was built in 1906 for J. M. Beckner, a single-taxer from Illinois. The house sustained minor damage in the 1906 hurricane. A fish market was operated out of the home from the 1920s until Hurricane Frederic in 1979. It was renovated into a bed and breakfast and restaurant in 1998.

The original portion of the house is a one and a half story, cross-gable structure. A later addition extended the building parallel to the street. The original block has a two-bay façade with a single-height shed roofed porch. The original paired one-over-one windows on the left of the first floor and on the front gable have been replaced with three-over-one. The original block has three rooms and a hall on the each floor.
