= Methodist Episcopal Church (Idaho Springs, Colorado) =

Historic church in Colorado, United States

- U.S. National Register of Historic Places
- Colorado State Register of Historic Properties
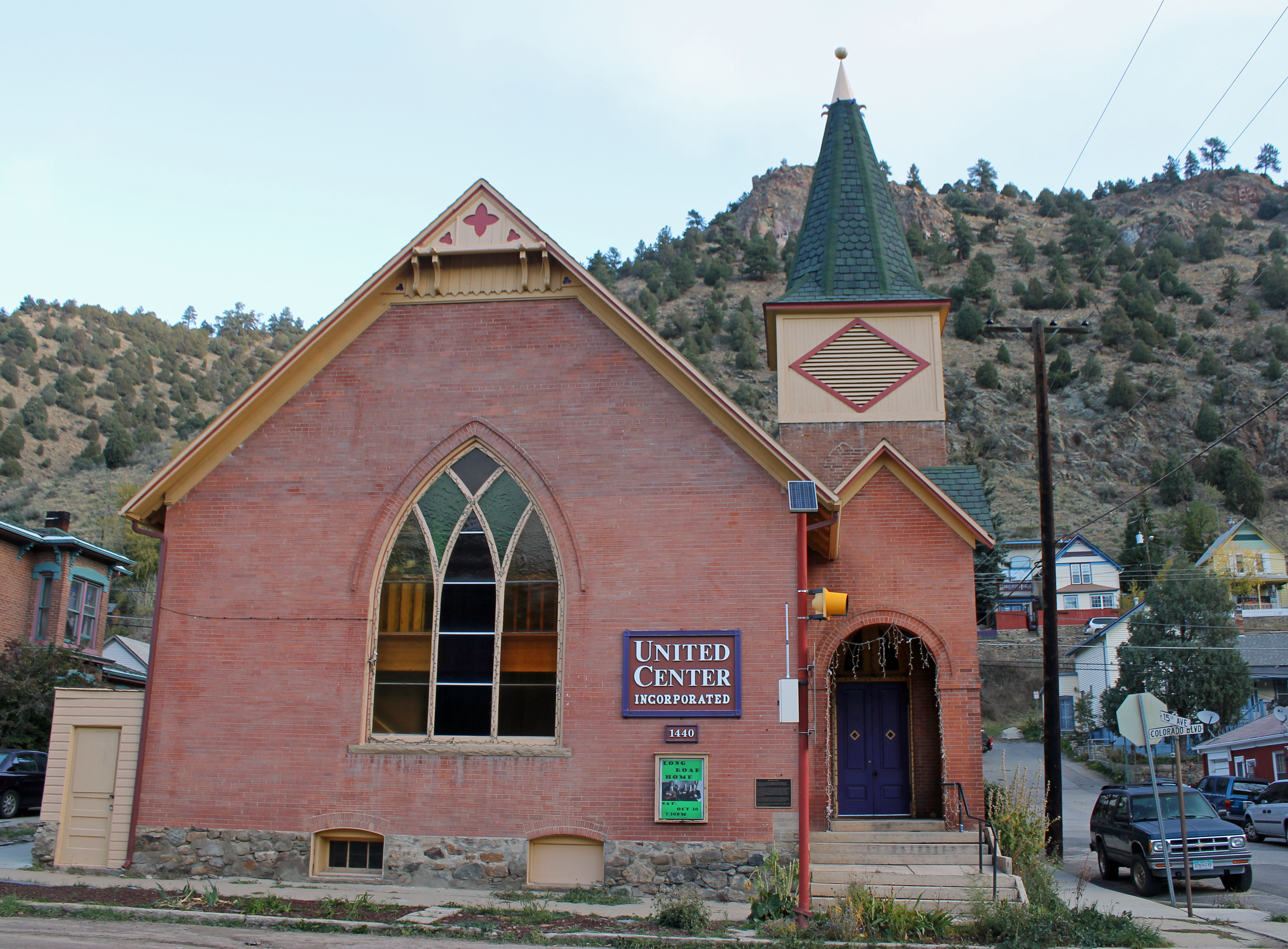

- Location within Colorado Location within the United States
- Location: 1414 Colorado Blvd., Idaho Springs, Colorado
- Coordinates: 39°44′35″N 105°31′0″W
- Area: less than one acre
- Built: 1880
- Architectural style: Gothic
- NRHP reference No.: 98000176
- CSRHP No.: 5CC.241
- Added to NRHP: March 5, 1998

Th Methodist Episcopal Church in Idaho Springs, Colorado, also known as the Idaho Methodist Episcopal Church, or the First United Methodist Church, or the Methodist Church of Idaho, is a historic Methodist Episcopal church building at 1414 Colorado Boulevard. It was built in 1880 and expanded in 1905. It was added to the National Register in 1998.

The church's design includes elements of Gothic Revival style.

The church's former parsonage, located to the north, has been modified and is not included in the listing.
