= Methodist Episcopal Church, South (Daphne, Alabama) =

Historic church in Alabama, United States

- U.S. National Register of Historic Places
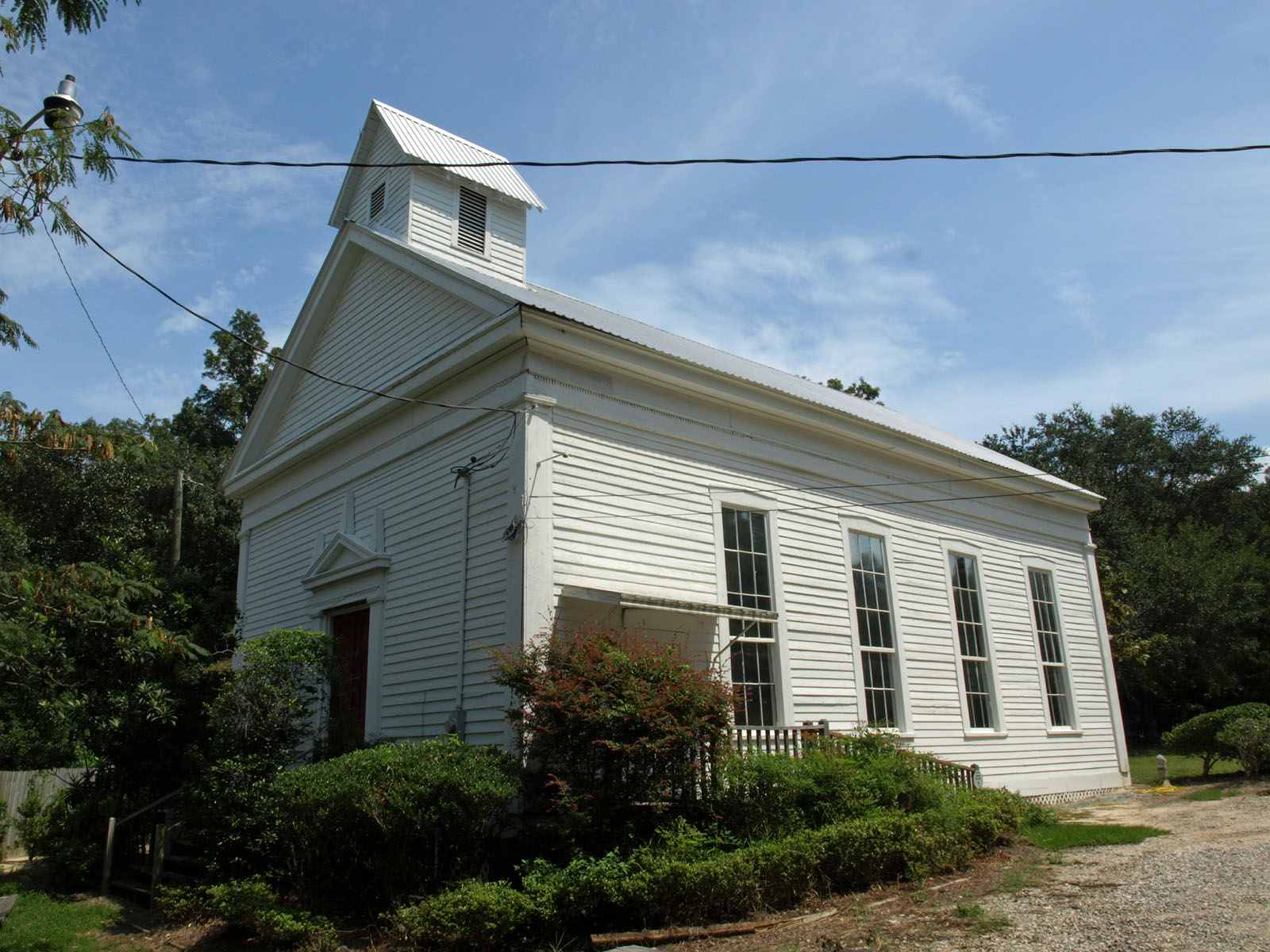

- Location within Alabama Location within the United States
- Location: 1608 Old County Rd., Daphne, Alabama
- Coordinates: 30°36′6″N 87°54′31″W
- Area: 1.2 acres (0.49 ha)
- Built: 1858
- Built by: Larkin F. Edmondson, Issac Alexander
- Architectural style: Greek Revival
- NRHP reference No.: 80000679
- Added to NRHP: September 22, 1980

Methodist Episcopal Church, South (also known as the Old Daphne Methodist Church) is a historic church at 1608 Old County Road in Daphne, Alabama, United States. It was built in 1858 in a Greek Revival style. The building was added to the National Register of Historic Places in 1980.

The building was constructed on land originally owned by Mr. and Mrs. William Howard since 1833. Another building may have stood on the site at an earlier date, since the associated graveyard contains markers dating back to 1847. The church and graveyard was purchased by the Methodist Episcopal Church from the Howards for $5 (equivalent to about $110 today) in 1869. The church changed hands once over the years, and the belfry was damaged in 1906 and 1916 by storms. The church was severely damaged by Hurricane Frederic in 1979, and has since been handed over to a local preservation group.
