= Silverhill, Alabama =

- Town
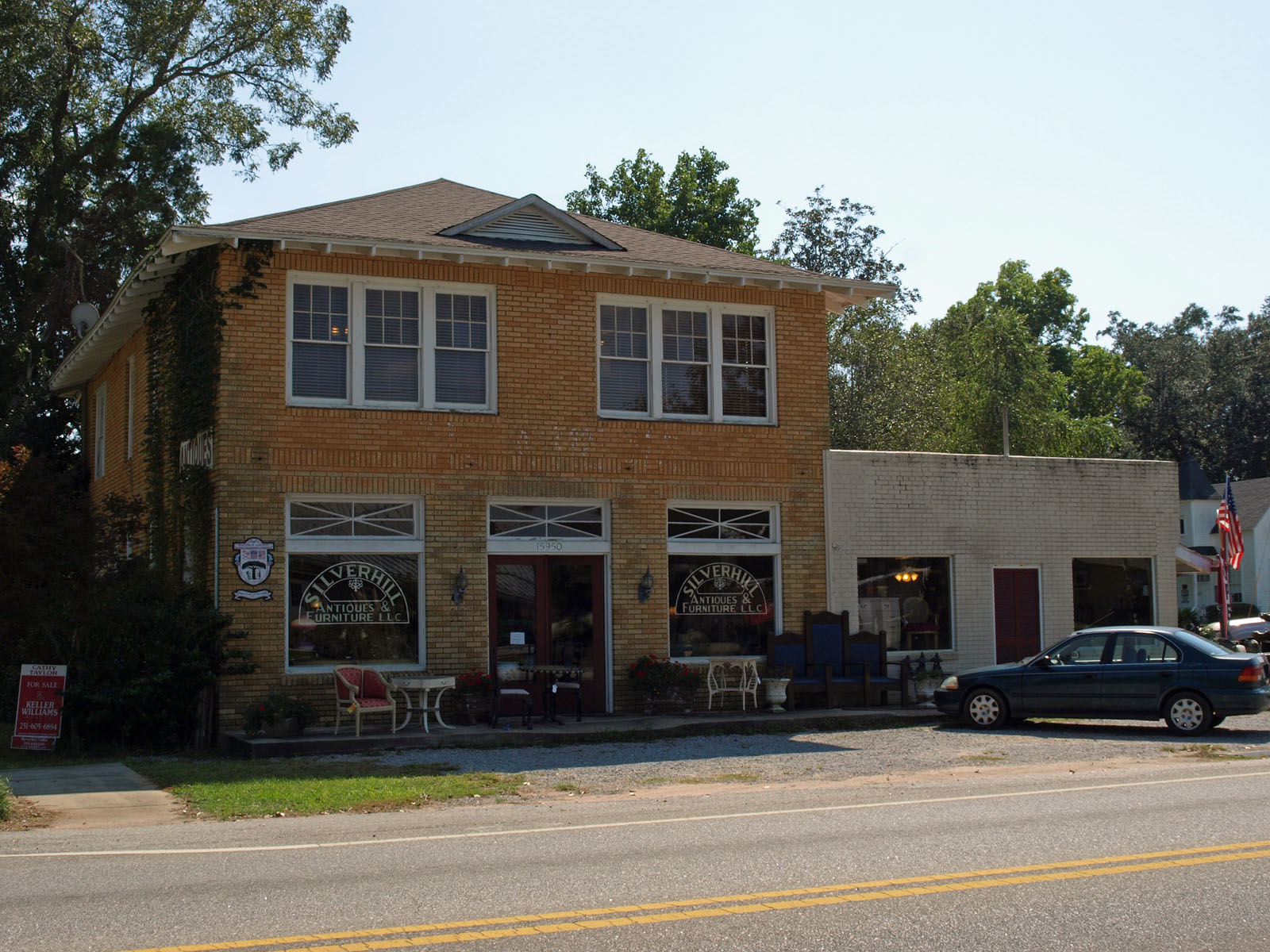
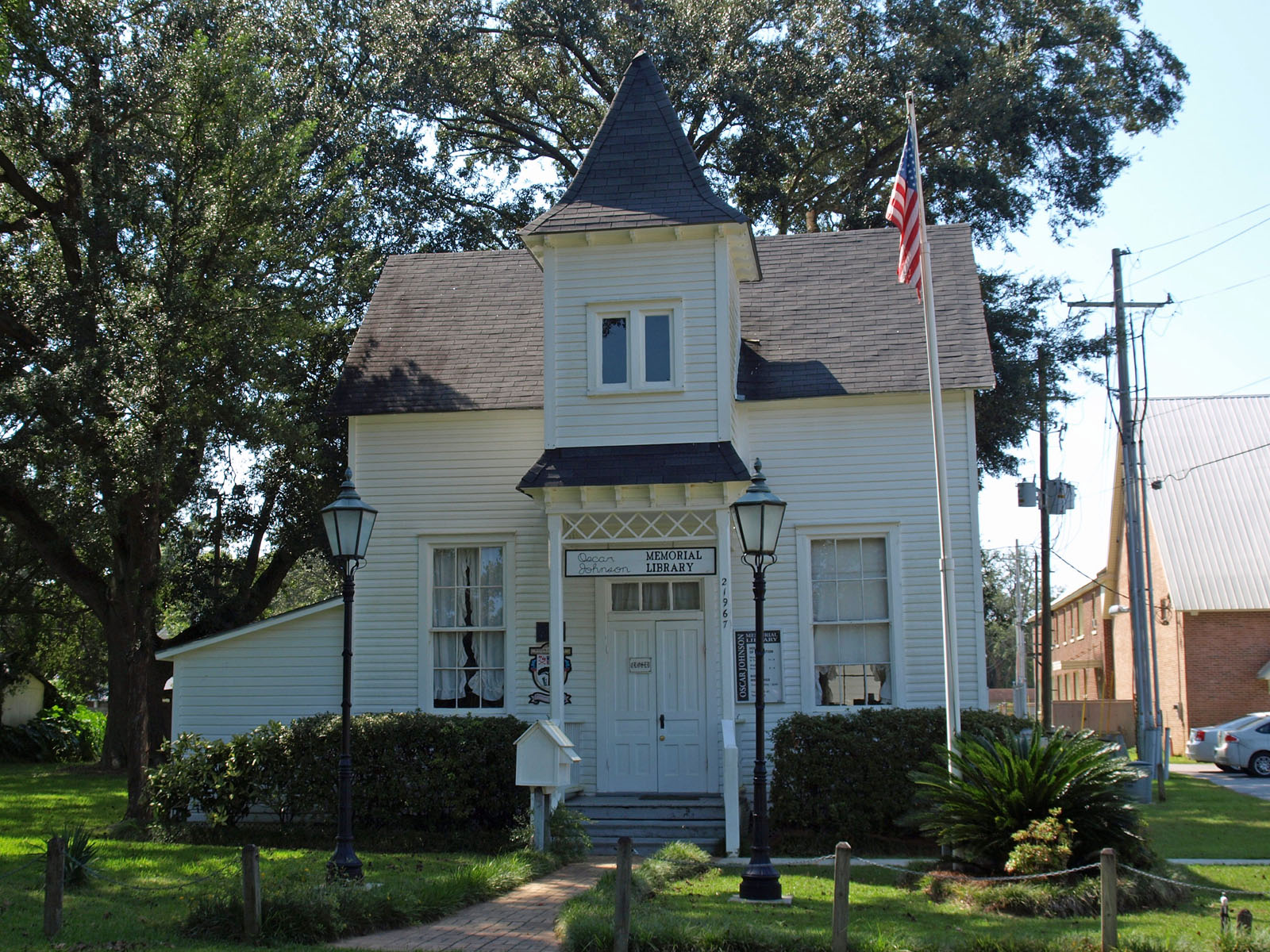
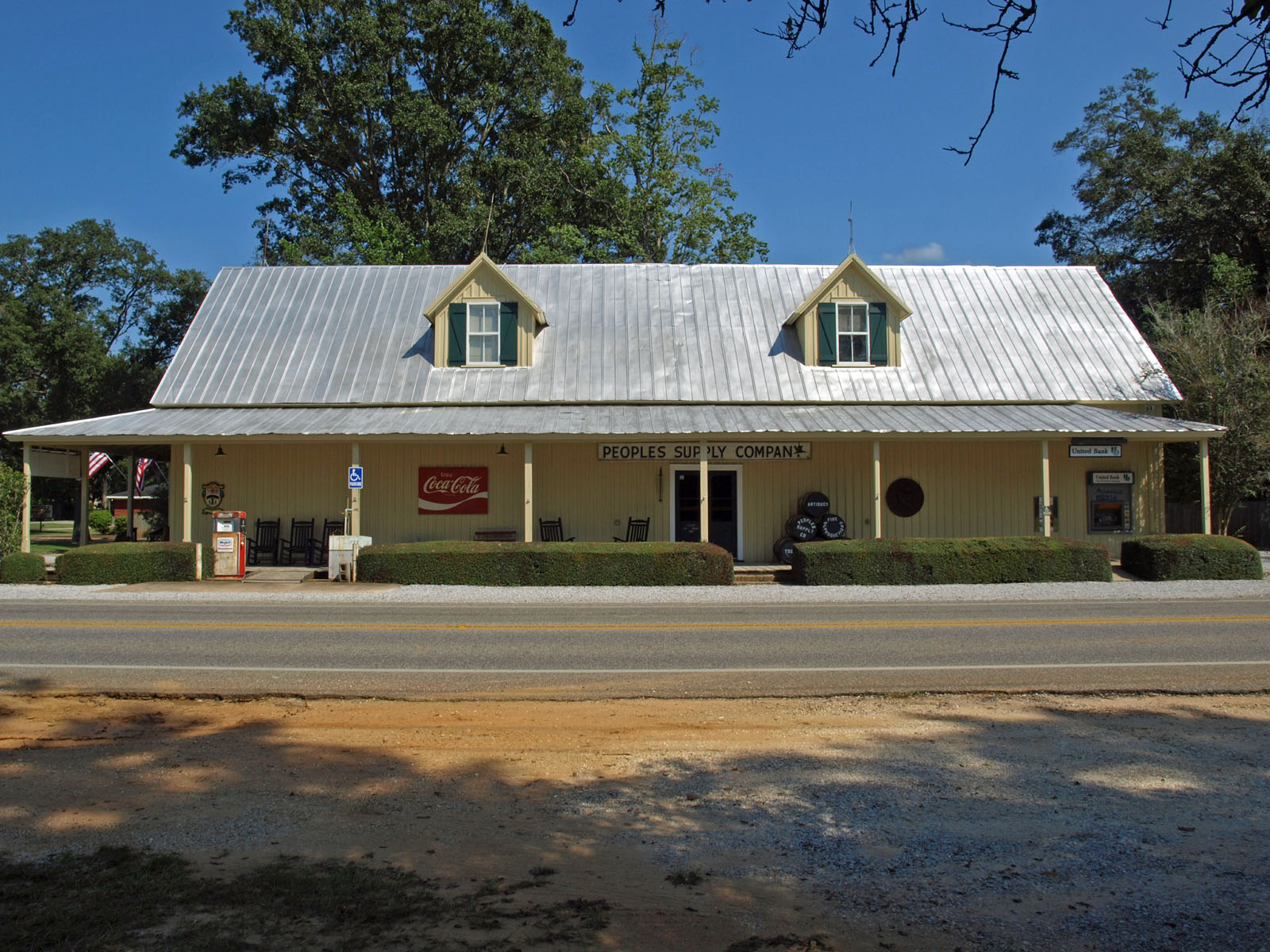
- State Bank Svea Land Company office People's Supply Company

- Seal
- Interactive map of Silverhill, Alabama
- Location within Alabama Location within the United States
- Coordinates: 30.545359°N 87.750557°W
- Country: United States
- State: Alabama
- County: Baldwin
- Founded: 1896
- Incorporated: August 13, 1926
- Founder: Oscar Johnson

Government
  - Mayor: Jared Lyles
  - Mayor Pro Tem: J. Steve Brooks
  - Town Clerk/Treasurer: Nicole C. Haigler
  - Councilmembers: Tonie L. Norden; Bert Jones; Wayne Gruenloh; Gerald Ardoin

Area
  - Total: 1.259 sq mi (3.261 km^{2})
  - Land: 1.256 sq mi (3.252 km^{2})
  - Water: 0.0027 sq mi (0.007 km^{2}) 0.24%
- Elevation: 144 ft (44 m)

Population (2020)
  - Total: 768
  - Estimate (2025): 2,529
  - Density: 612/sq mi (236/km^{2})
- Time zone: UTC−6 (Central (CST))
  - Summer (DST): UTC−5 (CDT)
- ZIP Code: 36576
- Area code: 251
- FIPS code: 01-70536
- GNIS feature ID: 2407342
- Website: silverhillalabama.com

Silverhill is a town in Baldwin County, Alabama, United States. The population was 768 at the 2020 census, and was estimated at 2,529 in 2025. It is part of the Daphne–Fairhope–Foley metropolitan area.

== Geography ==
Silverhill is located in southern Baldwin County 3 miles (5 km) west of Robertsdale. Alabama State Route 104 (Silverhill Avenue) runs through the center of the town, connecting Robertsdale to the east with Fairhope to the west.

According to the United States Census Bureau, the town has a total area of 1.259 square miles (3.26 km^{2}), of which 1.256 square miles (3.25 km^{2}) is land and 0.003 square miles (0.0078 km^{2}) (0.24%) is water.

== Demographics ==
Historical population
Census	Pop.	Note	%±
1930	314		—
1940	270		−14.0%
1950	354		31.1%
1960	417		17.8%
1970	552		32.4%
1980	624		13.0%
1990	556		−10.9%
2000	616		10.8%
2010	706		14.6%
2020	768		8.8%
2025 (est.)	2,529		229.3%
U.S. Decennial Census; 2020 Census

Silverhill, Alabama – racial and ethnic composition Note: the US Census treats Hispanic/Latino as an ethnic category. This table excludes Latinos from the racial categories and assigns them to a separate category. Hispanics/Latinos may be of any race.
Race / ethnicity (NH = non-Hispanic)	Pop. 2000	Pop. 2010	Pop. 2020	% 2000	% 2010	% 2020
White alone (NH)	599	646	668	97.24%	91.50%	86.98%
Black or African American alone (NH)	0	12	13	0.00%	1.70%	1.69%
Native American or Alaska Native alone (NH)	1	1	4	0.16%	0.14%	0.52%
Asian alone (NH)	4	2	10	0.65%	0.28%	1.30%
Pacific Islander alone (NH)	0	1	1	0.00%	0.14%	0.13%
Other race alone (NH)	0	0	2	0.00%	0.00%	0.26%
Mixed race or multiracial (NH)	3	4	30	0.49%	0.57%	3.91%
Hispanic or Latino (any race)	9	40	40	1.46%	5.67%	5.21%
Total	616	706	768	100.00%	100.00%	100.00%

=== 2020 census ===
As of the 2020 census, there were 768 people, 321 households, and 225 families residing in the town. The population density was 611.47 inhabitants per square mile (236.1/km^{2}). There were 336 housing units at an average density of 267.52 per square mile (103.3/km^{2}). The racial makeup of the town was 87.24% White, 1.95% African American, 0.52% Native American, 1.43% Asian, 0.13% Pacific Islander, 2.86% from some other races and 5.86% from two or more races. Hispanic or Latino people of any race were 5.21% of the population.

=== 2010 census ===
As of the 2010 census, there were 706 people, 277 households, and _ families residing in the town. The population density was 589.81 inhabitants per square mile (227.7/km^{2}). There were 315 housing units at an average density of 263.16 per square mile (101.6/km^{2}). The racial makeup of the town was 94.33% White, 1.70% African American, 0.14% Native American, 0.28% Asian, 0.14% Pacific Islander, 2.83% from some other races and 0.57% from two or more races. Hispanic or Latino people of any race were 5.67% of the population.

=== 2000 census ===
As of the 2000 census, there were 616 people, 241 households, and 178 families residing in the town. The population density was 517.50 inhabitants per square mile (199.8/km^{2}). There were 266 housing units at an average density of 223.47 per square mile (86.3/km^{2}). The racial makeup of the town was 98.05% White, 0.00% African American, 0.16% Native American, 0.65% Asian, 0.00% Pacific Islander, 0.00% from some other races and 1.14% from two or more races. Hispanic or Latino people of any race were 1.46% of the population.

24.8% were of American, 14.8% German, 10.2% Swedish, 9.0% English and 6.4% Irish ancestry.

There were 241 households, out of which 32.4% had children under the age of 18 living with them, 61.8% were married couples living together, 8.7% had a female householder with no husband present, and 26.1% were non-families. 20.7% of all households were made up of individuals, and 10.4% had someone living alone who was 65 years of age or older. The average household size was 2.54 and the average family size was 2.97.

In the town, the population was spread out, with 25.2% under the age of 18, 6.5% from 18 to 24, 25.8% from 25 to 44, 26.3% from 45 to 64, and 16.2% who were 65 years of age or older. The median age was 40 years. For every 100 females, there were 91.3 males. For every 100 females age 18 and over, there were 88.2 males.

The median income for a household in the town was $42,083, and the median income for a family was $51,964. Males had a median income of $30,417 versus $25,938 for females. The per capita income for the town was $20,723. About 3.8% of families and 4.8% of the population were below the poverty line, including 4.6% of those under age 18 and 5.1% of those age 65 or over.

== History ==
Silverhill was founded in 1897 by Oscar Johnson, C. O. Carlson and C. A. Valentin of Chicago, Illinois. Oscar Johnson was an immigrant from Dalarna, Sweden. The Svea Land Company in Chicago, which advertised land for sale in Silverhill, was founded by Oscar Johnson. Land was acquired by purchase from a Mr. Harford, the first block of land being 1,500 acres (610 ha), which was added to from time to time as the colonization work progressed. Scandinavian settlers came to Silverhill from virtually every state in the Union and began the development of what is now the Silverhill district.

In 1902, the local general store, People's Supply Company opened; and it served as a major hub for the community until the 1980s.

The Wales West Light Railway, a replica of a Welsh mountain railway, is located 5 miles (8 km) southwest of town.

== Education ==
Silverhill is a part of the Baldwin County Public Schools system. Silverhill has one school, Silverhill Elementary School, which serves grades kindergarten through 6. Silverhill students continue on to Central Baldwin Middle School (7-8) and Robertsdale High School (9-12), both of which are in Robertsdale.

== See also ==
- Central Baldwin
