= Stockton, Alabama =

- Unincorporated community
- Location of Stockton in Baldwin County, Alabama.
- Coordinates: 30°59′38″N 87°51′42″W
- Country: United States
- State: Alabama
- County: Baldwin

Area
  - Total: 9.63 sq mi (24.94 km^{2})
  - Land: 9.34 sq mi (24.20 km^{2})
  - Water: 0.29 sq mi (0.74 km^{2})
- Elevation: 105 ft (32 m)

Population (2020)
  - Total: 557
  - Density: 59.6/sq mi (23.02/km^{2})
- Time zone: UTC-6 (Central (CST))
  - Summer (DST): UTC-5 (CDT)
- ZIP codes: 36507, 36527, 36551, 36578
- Area code: 251
- FIPS code: 01-73272
- GNIS feature ID: 2633318

Stockton is an unincorporated community in Baldwin County, Alabama, United States. As of the 2020 census, Stockton had a population of 557. It is the nearest community to Bottle Creek Indian Mounds, a National Historic Landmark.

The community is part of the Daphne-Fairhope-Foley metropolitan area.

== Demographics ==
Historical population
Census	Pop.	Note	%±
2020	557		—
U.S. Decennial Census

The most recent estimates of the population of the community, puts the population somewhere near 2,046 individuals. These estimates also list the following races and ethnicities:

- Caucasian/White - 79.7%
- African-Americans - 18.2%
- Native Americans - 2.1%

=== 2020 census ===
Stockton CDP, Alabama – Racial and ethnic composition Note: the US Census treats Hispanic/Latino as an ethnic category. This table excludes Latinos from the racial categories and assigns them to a separate category. Hispanics/Latinos may be of any race.
Race / Ethnicity (NH = Non-Hispanic)	Pop 2020	2020
White alone (NH)	489	87.79%
Black or African American alone (NH)	37	6.64%
Native American or Alaska Native alone (NH)	6	1.08%
Asian alone (NH)	0	0.00%
Native Hawaiian or Pacific Islander alone (NH)	3	0.54%
Other race alone (NH)	1	0.18%
Mixed race or Multiracial (NH)	14	2.51%
Hispanic or Latino (any race)	7	1.26%
Total	557	100.00%

== History ==
The community is most likely named for Francis Stockton, who was appointed in 1809 to select a site for the first Baldwin County courthouse. The Stockton post office first began operations in 1837. The U. S. Mail service delivered mail from Montgomery, Alabama by stage coach twice a week to Stockton. In 1855 the United States government started a mail service between Mobile, Stockton and Claiborne, Alabama. Steamship operators were awarded contracts for carrying the mail, each leaving Mobile twice a week and touching at Stockton, which was connected to Montgomery by a stagecoach line.

== Transportation ==
Stockton is served by several major roadways, in and around the small community. Stockton is also home to a small seaplane base, mainly frequented by general aviation traffic.

=== Major Roadways ===
- Interstate 65
- Alabama State Route 59

=== Airfields ===
- Hubbard Landing Seaplane Base

=== Education ===
The school district is Baldwin County Public Schools.

School facilities:

- Stockton Junior High School (SJHS, Defunct)

The Stockton Junior High School burned down in 1973 due to disputed causes.

- Vaughn School (Defunct)

The Vaughn School was torn down to create a park, the second of such a park constructed on old school grounds.

== Gallery ==
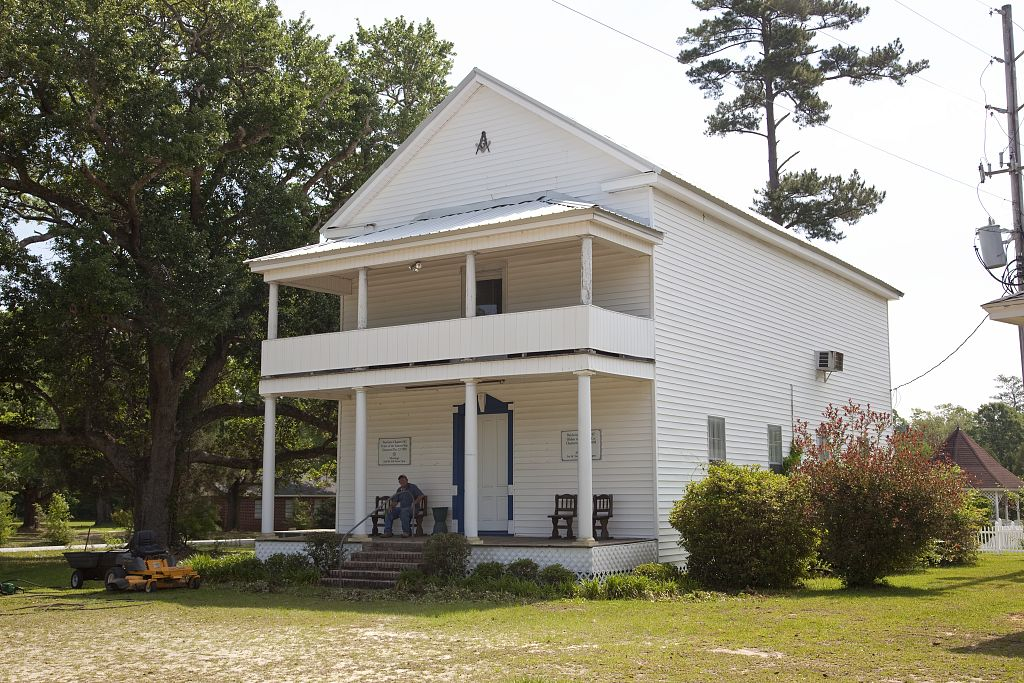
Masonic Hall

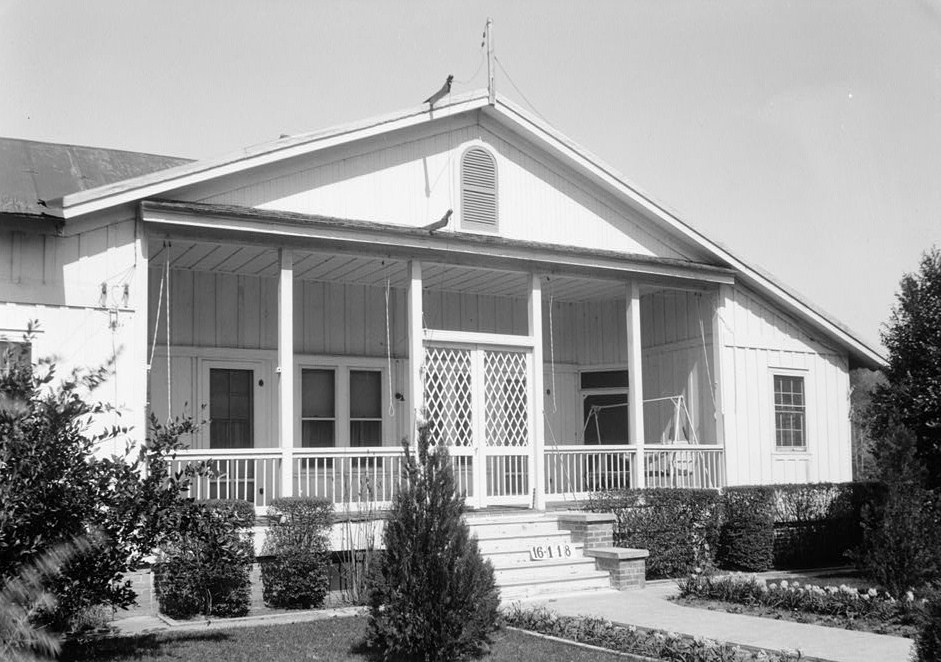
McMillan House

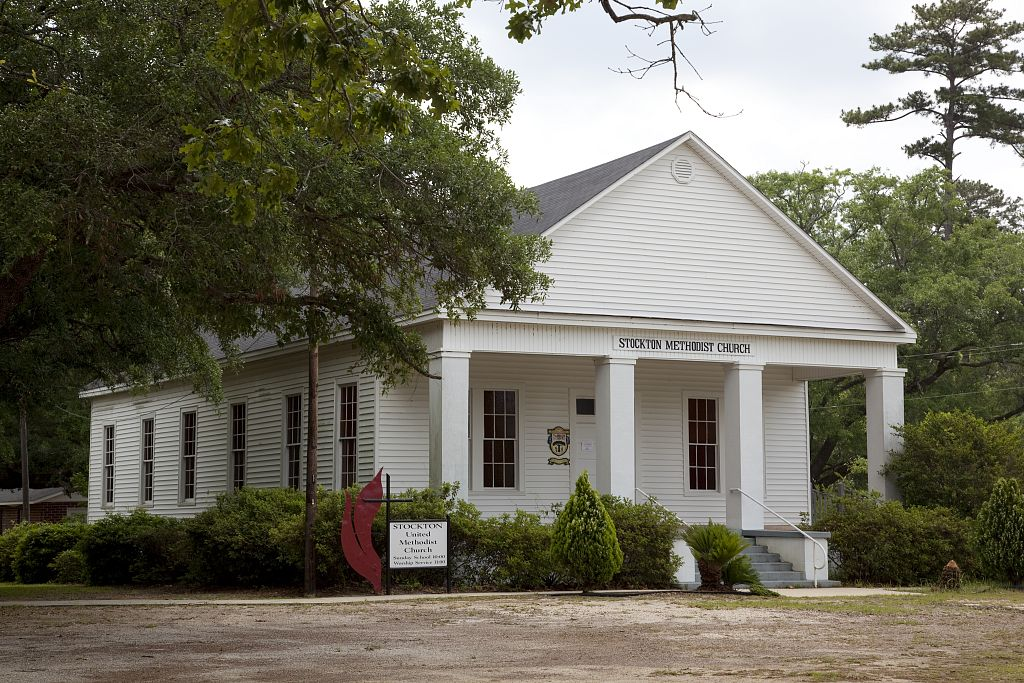
Methodist Church
