= Latham United Methodist Church =

Historic church in Alabama, United States

- U.S. National Register of Historic Places
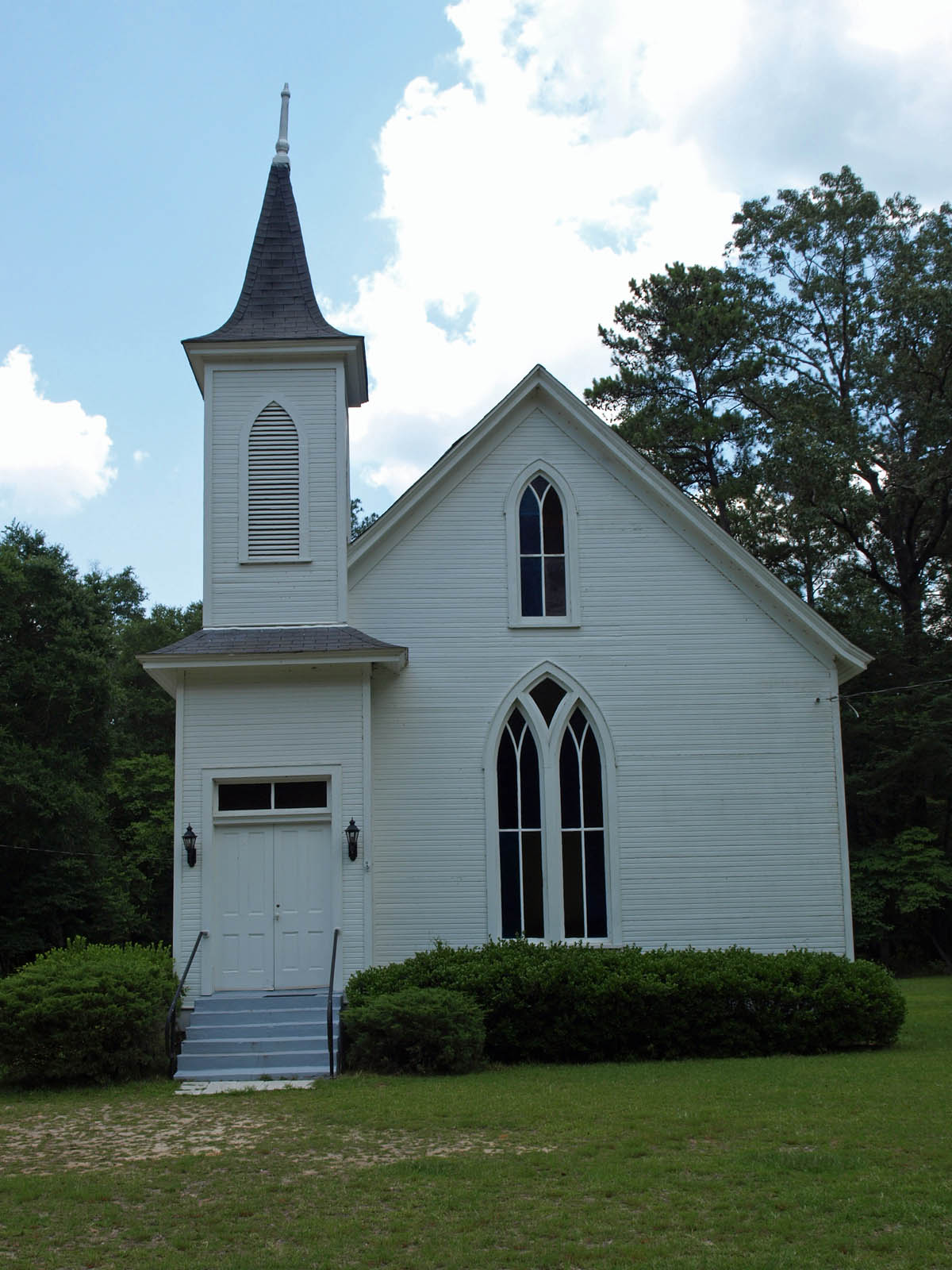
- The church in June 2013

- Location within Alabama Location within the United States
- Location: E side Hwy. 59, Latham, Alabama
- Coordinates: 31°5′54″N 87°49′51″W
- Area: 3.1 acres (1.3 ha)
- Built: 1906
- Architectural style: Late Gothic Revival
- MPS: Rural Churches of Baldwin County TR
- NRHP reference No.: 88001350
- Added to NRHP: August 25, 1988

Latham United Methodist Church is an American historic church building on the east side of Highway 59 in Baldwin County, Alabama. It was built in 1906 and added to the National Register of Historic Places in 1988. This church is one of the last remaining buildings that was located in Latham, Alabama.

== History ==
The community of Lathem was most likely named after the first postmaster, Latham Cooper, with a post office in operation under the name Latham from 1880 to 1960. Prior to the coming of the post office the town had been known as Red Hill. The church was organized in 1847 and held at a log house about a half a mile northeast of the current building. Two more buildings were used prior to moving to the final building in 1906. In 1852, The church moved to a new log building built about 150 feet north of the current building. Then in 1886 to a frame building. In 1909, the name of the church was changed to Lathem
