= Battles Wharf, Alabama =

Unincorporated community in Alabama, United States

- Unincorporated community
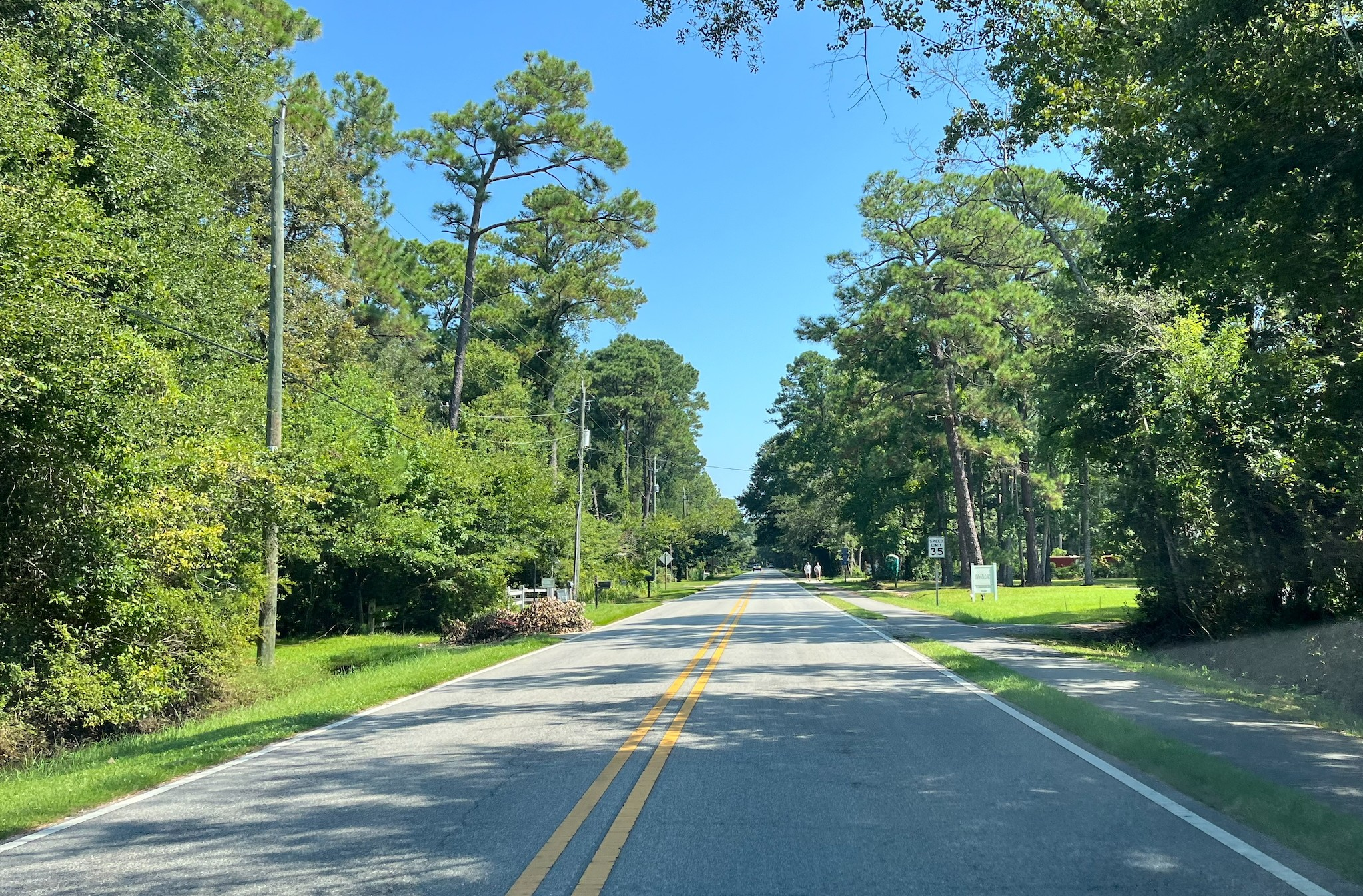
- Battles Wharf, Alabama from U.S. Route 98 Alternate

- Location within the state of Alabama Battles Wharf, Alabama (the United States)
- Coordinates: 30.49436°N 87.92777°W
- Country: United States
- State: Alabama
- County: Baldwin
- Elevation: 7 ft (2.1 m)
- Time zone: UTC-6 (Central (CST))
  - Summer (DST): UTC-5 (CDT)
- Area code: 251
- GNIS feature ID: 157887

Battles Wharf, formerly known as Yarborough, Dadeville, Battles, and Narcissus, is an unincorporated community in Baldwin County, Alabama, United States.

== History ==
Battles Wharf community has gone through a number of name changes. It was originally known as Yarborough, possibly in honor of a local family. The name was then changed to Dadeville to honor R. R. Dade. The name later changed to Battles, but due to another community in Alabama having a similar name, it was then renamed Narcissus, in honor of the figure from Greek mythology. Finally, the community became known as Battles Wharf. A post office operated under the name Battles from 1875 to 1903, under the name Narcissus from 1903 to 1904, and under the name Battles Wharf from 1904 to 1961.
