= Stuart House =

Stuart House may refer to:

United Kingdom

- Stuart House, Cornwall, Liskeard, Cornwall
- Stuart House, London, Knightsbridge, London

United States

- Henry Stuart House, Montrose, Alabama, listed on the National Register of Historic Places (NRHP) in Baldwin County
- Dr. Richard and Paulina Stuart House, Des Moines, Iowa, NRHP-listed in Polk County
- John Stuart House (Glendale, Kentucky), NRHP-listed in Hardin County, Kentucky
- Jesse Stuart House, Greenup, Kentucky, NRHP-listed in Greenup County, Kentucky
- Charles E. Stuart House, Kalamazoo, Michigan, NRHP-listed in Kalamazoo County, Michigan
- Robert Stuart House, Mackinac Island, Michigan, NRHP-listed in Mackinac County
- Dr. Stuart House, Dayton, Oregon, NRHP-listed in Yamhill County
- Gilbert Stuart Birthplace, Saunderstown, Rhode Island, NRHP-listed in Washington County
- Col. John Stuart House, Charleston, South Carolina, NRHP-listed in Charleston
- Stuart House (Victoria, Texas), NRHP-listed in Victoria County, Texas
- J.E.B. Stuart Birthplace, at Laurel Hill Farm, Ararat, Virginia, NRHP-listed in Patrick County
- Stuart House (Staunton, Virginia), NRHP-listed in Staunton
- Women's Club of Olympia, also known as the Abigail Stuart House, NRHP-listed in Thurston County
- Stuart House and Gardens, Seattle, Washington, NRHP-listed in King County
- Stuart Manor, Lewisburg, West Virginia, NRHP-listed in Greenbrier County
- W. Scott Stuart House, West Union, West Virginia, NRHP-listed in Doddridge County

== See also ==
- Stewart House (disambiguation)
- John Stuart House (disambiguation)
- Stuart Building (disambiguation)
