= Stewart House =

Stewart House may refer to:

== In Australia ==
- Stewart House (Australia), a children's institution in New South Wales

in the United States

(by state then city)

- Stewart-Blanton House, Carrollton, Alabama
- Buell-Stallings-Stewart House, Greenville, Alabama
- Amelia Stewart House, Mobile, Alabama
- Tankersley-Stewart House, Hunt, Arkansas
- Stewart House (Little Rock, Arkansas)
- Giboney-Robertson-Stewart House, Wynne, Arkansas
- George C. Stewart House (1909), Montecito, California, a Frank Lloyd Wright house
- James Stewart, Jr., House, Christina, Delaware
- James Stewart House (Glasgow, Delaware)
- Dr. James A. Stewart House, Portal, Georgia, listed on the NRHP in Bulloch County
- A.H. Stewart House, Parma, Idaho, listed on the NRHP in Canyon County
- Robinson-Stewart House, Carmi, Illinois
- Minnie Stewart House, Monmouth, Illinois
- Stewart-Studebaker House, Bluffton, Indiana
- Stewart Manor (Charles B. Sommers House), Indianapolis, Indiana
- J. W. Stewart House, Davenport, Iowa, listed on the NRHP in Scott County
- Frank Stewart House, Washington, Iowa
- Dr. Edward S. Stewart House, Fairview, Kentucky, listed on the NRHP in Christian County
- Stewart House (Henderson, Kentucky), listed on the NRHP in Henderson County
- G. W. Stewart House, Shelbyville, Kentucky, listed on the NRHP in Shelby County
- Heyman-Stewart House, Clinton, Louisiana, listed on the NRHP in East Feliciana Parish
- Stewart-Dougherty House, Baton Rouge, Louisiana, listed on the NRHP in East Baton Rouge Parish
- Peggy Stewart House, Annapolis, Maryland
- Frank H. Stewart House, Newton, Massachusetts
- Henry Stewart House, Waltham, Massachusetts
- William E. Stewart House, North Mankato, Minnesota, listed on the NRHP in Nicollet County
- Stewart-Anderson House, Tupelo, Mississippi
- Stewart House (Toms River, New Jersey)
- Stewart Cobblestone Farmhouse, Mendon, New York
- Stewart House and Howard–Stewart Family Cemetery, South Jefferson, New York
- Graves-Stewart House, Clinton, North Carolina
- Stewart-Hawley-Malloy House, Laurinburg, North Carolina
- Savage-Stewart House, Canaanville, Ohio
- Stewart-Hanson Farm, Stow, Ohio, listed on the NRHP in Summit County
- LaSells D. Stewart House, Cottage Grove, Oregon, listed on the NRHP in Lane County
- John Stewart Houses (Philadelphia, Pennsylvania)
- James Stewart House (Lexington, South Carolina)
- Stewart House (Newberry, South Carolina), formerly listed on the NRHP in Newberry County
- John Stewart House (Decatur, Tennessee), listed on the NRHP in Meigs County
- Dr. James M. and Dove Stewart House, Katy, Texas, listed on the NRHP in Harris County
- Stewart-Woolley House, Kanab, Utah
- LeConte Stewart House, Kaysville, Utah, listed on the NRHP in Davis County
- Stewart-Hills House, Orem, Utah
- Stewart Ranch buildings, near Woodland, Utah, all
  - Barnard J. Stewart Ranch House
  - Charles B. Stewart Ranch House
  - Samuel W. Stewart Ranch House
  - Stewart-Hewlett Ranch Dairy Barn
  - Stewart Ranch Foreman's House
  - Lester F. and Margaret Stewart Hewlett Ranch House
  - Ethelbert White and William M. Stewart Ranch House
- Stewart-Hinton House, Petersburg, Virginia
- Stewart-Lee House, Richmond, Virginia
- David Stewart Farm, Triadelphia, West Virginia
- Stewart Hall (Morgantown, West Virginia)
- Hiram C. Stewart House, Wausau, Wisconsin
- Elinore Pruitt Stewart Homestead, McKinnon, Wyoming

== See also ==
- James Stewart House (disambiguation)
- John Stewart House (disambiguation)
