= James Stewart House =

James Stewart House may refer to:

- James Stewart Jr. House, Christina, Delaware, listed on the NRHP in New Castle County, Delaware
- James Stewart House (Glasgow, Delaware), listed on the NRHP in New Castle County, Delaware
- Dr. James A. Stewart House, Portal, Georgia, listed on the NRHP in Bulloch County, Georgia
- James Stewart House (Lexington, South Carolina), listed on the NRHP, in Lexington County
- Dr. James M. and Dove Stewart House, Katy, Texas, listed on the NRHP in Harris County, Texas

== See also ==
- Stewart House (disambiguation)
