= Pine Valley, Utah =

Pine Valley, Utah may refer to three places in Utah:

- Pine Valley, Washington County, Utah, an unincorporated community
- Pine Valley (Provo River), a valley along the North Fork of the Provo River
- Pine Valley (Beaver, Millard, Iron counties, Utah), a valley in southwestern Utah

== See also ==
- Pine Valley (disambiguation)
