= John Stuart House =

John Stuart House may refer to:

- John Stuart House (Glendale, Kentucky), listed on the National Register of Historic Places in Hardin County, Kentucky
- Col. John Stuart House, Charleston, South Carolina, listed on the National Register of Historic Places in Charleston, South Carolina

== See also ==
- John Stewart House (disambiguation)
- Stuart House (disambiguation)
