= Pine Valley =

Pine Valley may refer to:

== Communities ==
=== In Australia ===
- Pine Valley, New South Wales

=== In Canada ===
- Pine Valley, Ontario

=== In the United States ===
- Pine Valley, California
- Pine Valley, New Jersey
- Pine Valley, New York
- Pine Valley, Houston, Texas, a neighborhood
- Pine Valley, Washington County, Utah, community in Washington County, south of the Escalante Desert
- Pine Valley, Wisconsin

=== Fictional communities ===
- Pine Valley (All My Children), fictional suburb of Philadelphia
- Pine Valley, Washington, fictional town in the game World in Conflict

== Geographic locations ==
- Pine Valley (Missouri), a valley in Reynolds County, Missouri
- Pine Valley (Beaver, Millard, and Iron counties, Utah), a valley in Beaver, Millard, and Iron counties in Utah, north of the Escalante Desert
- Pine Valley (Provo River), a valley in Summit and Wasatch counties, in Utah
- Pine Valley Mountains, a mountain range in Washington and Iron counties in southwestern Utah
- Pine Valley Mountain Wilderness, a designated wilderness area in northern Washington County, Utah

== Other uses ==
- Pine Valley Cosmonauts, music ensemble from Chicago
- Pine Valley Golf Club, in Pine Valley, New Jersey

== See also ==
- Kedrovaya Pad Nature Reserve, Russia; name means Korean Pine Valley
