= Montrose Historic District =

Montrose Historic District may refer to the following historic districts:

- Montrose Historic District (Montrose, Alabama), listed on the National Register of Historic Places
- Montrose Historic District (Montrose, Pennsylvania), listed on the National Register of Historic Places
