= Hewlett House =

Hewlett House may refer to:

in the United States

(by state then town)

- Hewlett-Packard House and Garage, Palo Alto, California, listed on the National Register of Historic Places (NRHP), in Santa Clara County
- R. Buckminster Fuller and Anne Hewlett Dome Home, Carbondale, Illinois, NRHP-listed
- Hewlett House (Cold Spring Harbor, New York), NRHP-listed, in Suffolk County
- Lester F. and Margaret Stewart Hewlett Ranch House, Woodland, Utah, NRHP-listed in Summit County
- Verner O. Hewlett Ranch House, Woodland, Utah, NRHP-listed in Summit County
- Stewart-Hewlett Ranch Dairy Barn, Woodland, Utah, NRHP-listed in Summit County
