= Tolstoy Park =

- Henry Stuart House
- U.S. National Register of Historic Places
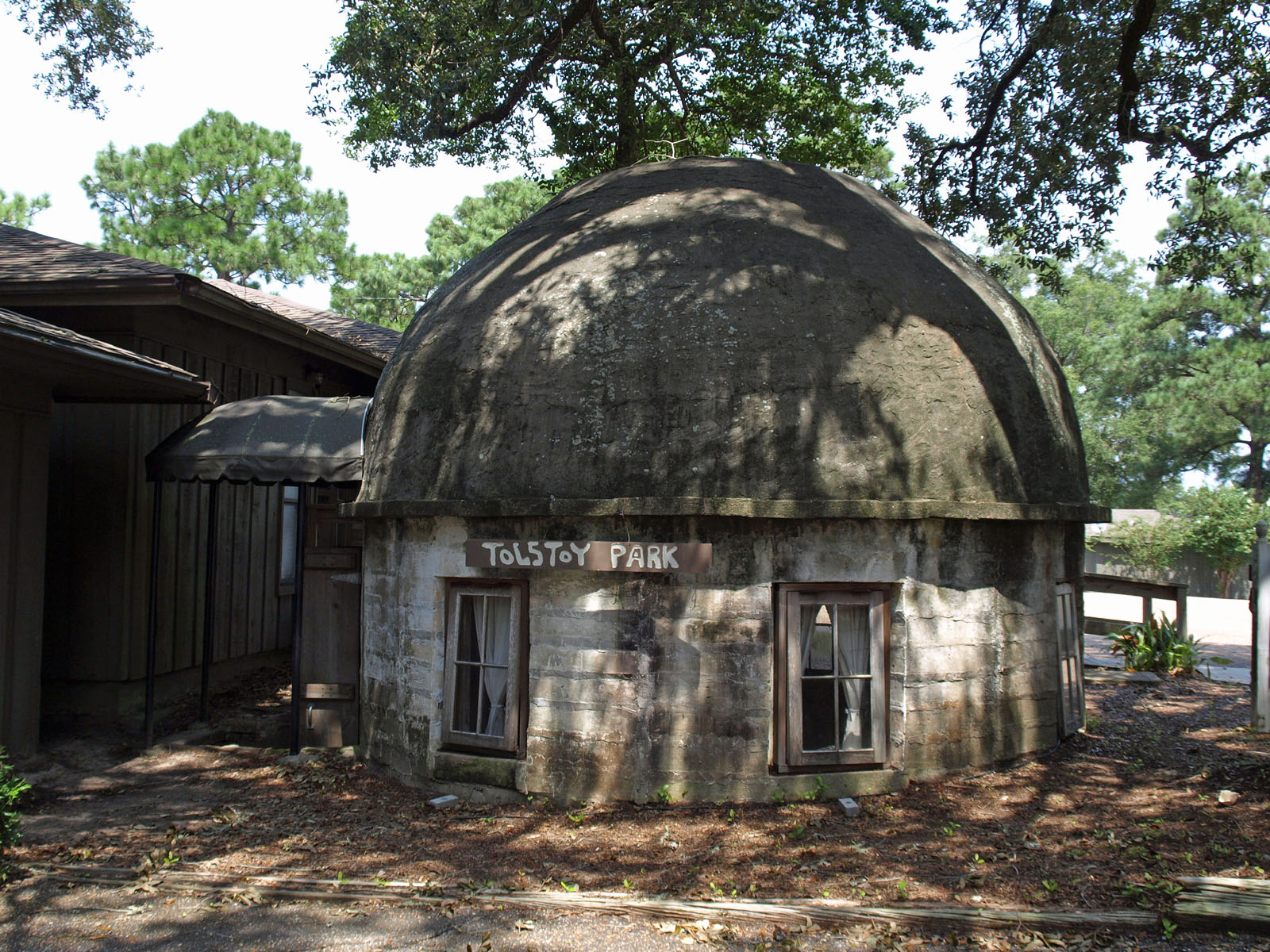
- The house in September 2012

- Location within Alabama Location within the United States
- Location: 22787 AL 98, Montrose, Alabama
- Coordinates: 30°33′23″N 87°53′38″W
- Area: less than one acre
- Built: 1926
- Architect: Henry Stuart
- NRHP reference No.: 05000841
- Added to NRHP: October 27, 2006

Tolstoy Park (also known as the Henry Stuart House and the Hermit House) is a historic residence in Montrose, Alabama, United States. The house was built by Henry Stuart, an Englishman who had emigrated to the United States as a child. Stuart was living in Nampa, Idaho, when he was diagnosed with tuberculosis and advised to move to a warmer climate to live out his days. In 1923, he purchased 10 acres (4 ha) outside Fairhope, Alabama, which he named Tolstoy Park.

Stuart began building a circular, domed hut in 1925, pouring each concrete block himself. Construction was completed in less than a year, although delayed by a hurricane in September 1926. The house is about 14 feet (4.2 m) in diameter and sunk 2 feet (61 cm) into the ground. Six top-hinged windows circle the building, and there were two skylights in the roof that are now permanently closed. Stuart sought to live a simple life, growing much of his own food and weaving rugs on a loom he brought from Idaho. He kept a guestbook for visitors to sign; notably, lawyer Clarence Darrow visited the hut six times. Stuart left Alabama in 1944, moving to Oregon to live with his son, where he died in 1946.

Today, the hut and a large oak tree are all that remain of Stuart's estate; a parking lot for a real estate office surrounds the hut. A novel based on Stuart's life, The Poet of Tolstoy Park, was published in 2005. The house was listed on the National Register of Historic Places in 2006.
