= Montrose, Alabama =

Unincorporated community in Alabama, United States

- Unincorporated community
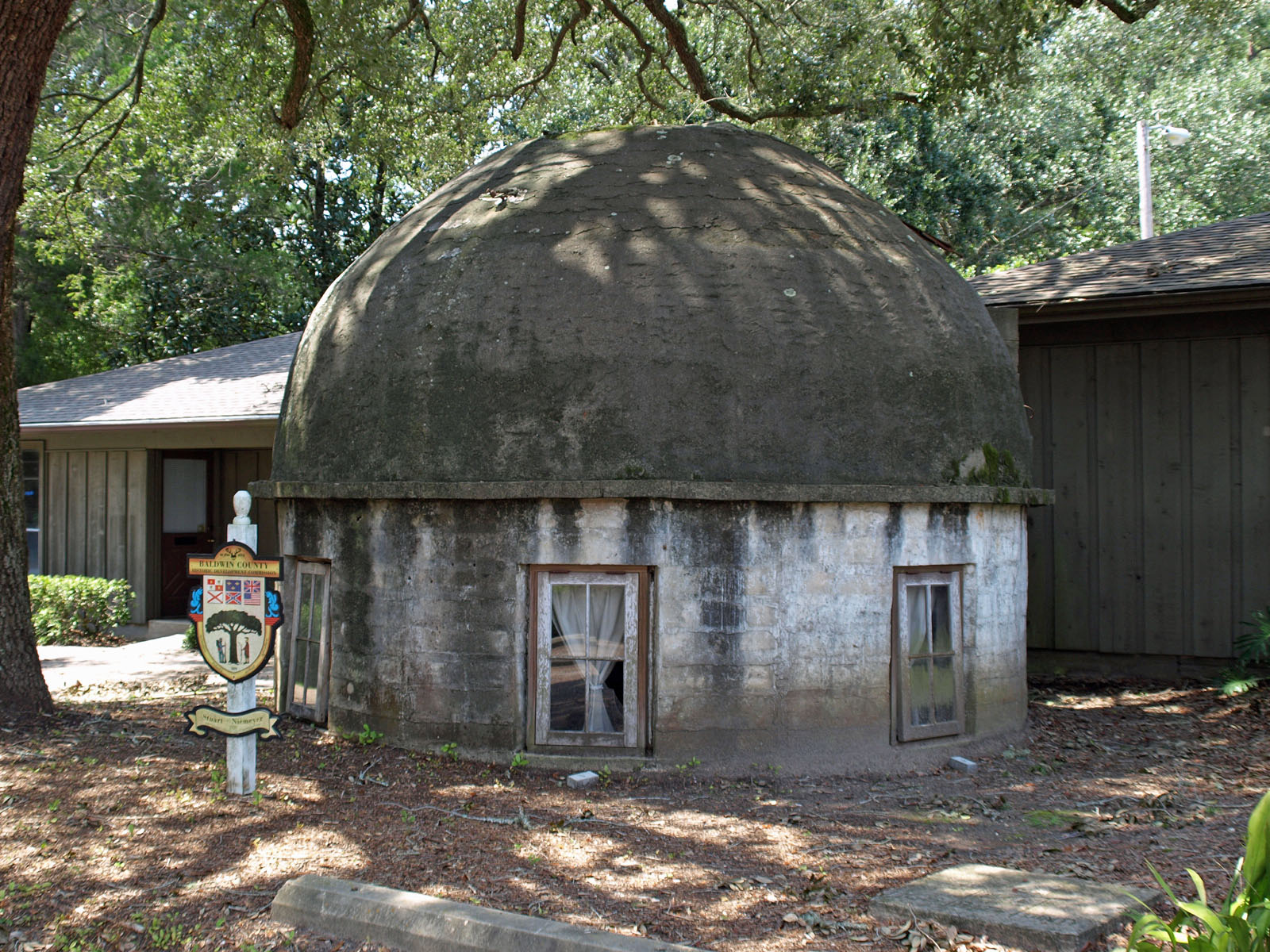
- Tolstoy Park

- Location within the state of Alabama Montrose, Alabama (the United States)
- Coordinates: 30°33′54″N 87°53′38″W
- Country: United States
- State: Alabama
- County: Baldwin
- Elevation: 102 ft (31 m)
- Time zone: UTC-6 (Central (CST))
  - Summer (DST): UTC-5 (CDT)
- ZIP code: 36559
- Area code: 251
- GNIS feature ID: 152365

Montrose, also known as Sibley City, is an unincorporated community in Baldwin County, Alabama, United States along the eastern shore of Mobile Bay.

Montrose is part of the Daphne–Fairhope–Foley Micropolitan Statistical Area. Montrose has two sites included on the National Register of Historic Places, the Henry Stuart House and the Montrose Historic District.

== History ==
The community was originally known as Sibley City in honor of Cyrus Sibley, an early landowner in the area. The name was then changed to Montrose, in honor of Montrose, Scotland. A post office first opened under the name Montrose in 1879.

== Notable people ==
- Miller Reese Hutchison (1876–1944), electrical engineer and inventor credited with developing some of the first portable electric devices, such as the vehicle horn and hearing aid.
- Eric Yelding, former Major League Baseball player for the Houston Astros and Chicago Cubs.

== See also ==
- Eastern Shore
