= Common Street District =

Historic district in Alabama, United States

- U.S. National Register of Historic Places
- U.S. Historic district
- Location within Mobile, Alabama Location within Alabama Location within the United States
- Location: Mobile, Alabama
- Coordinates: 30°41′14″N 88°3′27″W
- Architectural style: Greek Revival, Italianate
- NRHP reference No.: 82002058
- Added to NRHP: February 4, 1982

The Common Street District is a historic district in Mobile, Alabama. It is composed of seventeen residences from 959 to 1002 Dauphin Street and 7 to 19 Common Street, primarily featuring examples of Greek Revival, Italianate, and Queen Anne style architecture. It was added to the National Register of Historic Places on February 4, 1982. The district was later absorbed into the much larger Old Dauphin Way Historic District.

== Gallery ==
Examples of architecture within the Common Street District:

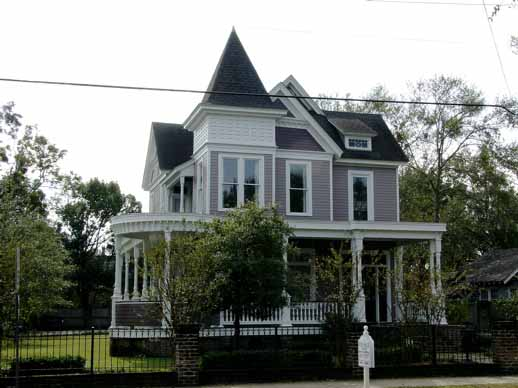
Cameron-Sanders House at 1001 Dauphin Street

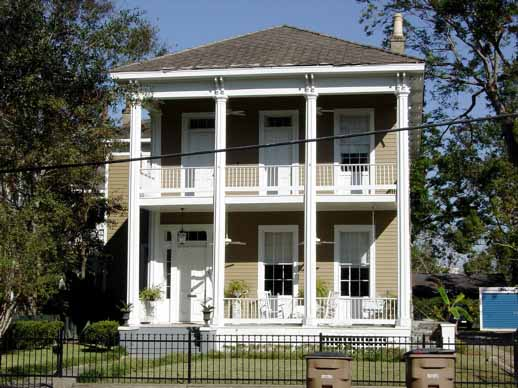
Herpin-Smith House at 960 Dauphin Street

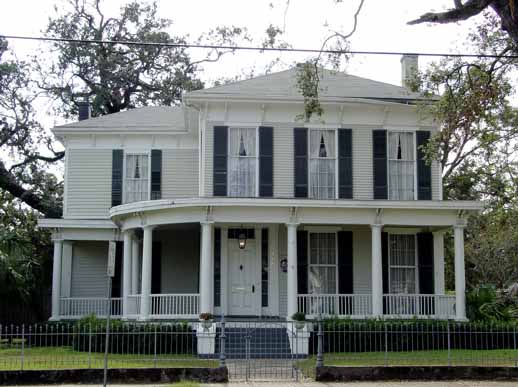
Stewart-Klotz House at 959 Dauphin Street
