= Amelia Stewart House =

Historic house in Alabama, United States

- U.S. National Register of Historic Places
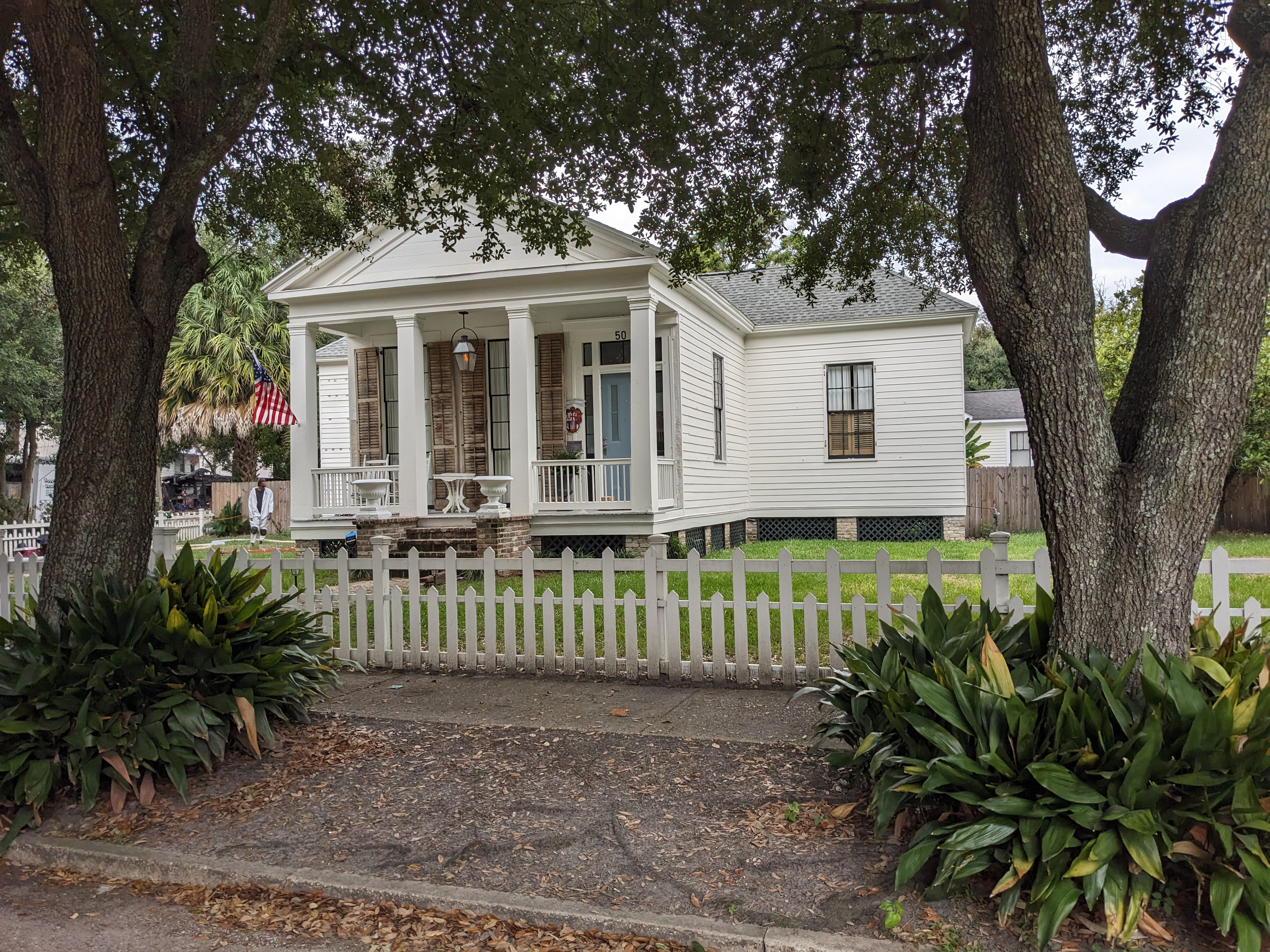
- The house in 2023

- Location within Mobile, Alabama Location within Alabama Location within the United States
- Location: 50 Common Street, Mobile, Alabama
- Coordinates: 30°41′10″N 88°3′28″W
- Built: 1835
- Architectural style: Greek Revival
- NRHP reference No.: 92000629
- Added to NRHP: May 29, 1992

The Amelia Stewart House, also known as the Carol O. Wilkinson House and William Hallett House, is a historic residence in Mobile, Alabama, United States. It was built in 1835, with a significant Greek Revival style addition to the front built in 1871. The house was placed on the National Register of Historic Places on May 29, 1992, based on its architectural significance.

== History ==
The original house was built in 1835 along Spring Hill Road (now called Springhill Avenue), in what was at the time well outside the city, but today sits firmly in the city's Midtown neighborhood. Merchant William R. Hallett built a large Greek Revival mansion with several outbuildings including a garçonnière for his sons. The main house burned in the 1860s, but the garçonnière survived. In 1871, the property was purchased by Amelia Stewart, who began construction of a new house adjoining the garçonnière.

In 2018, facing demolition to make way for a medical office building parking lot, the house was moved to 50 Common St., in the Common Street District.

== Architecture ==
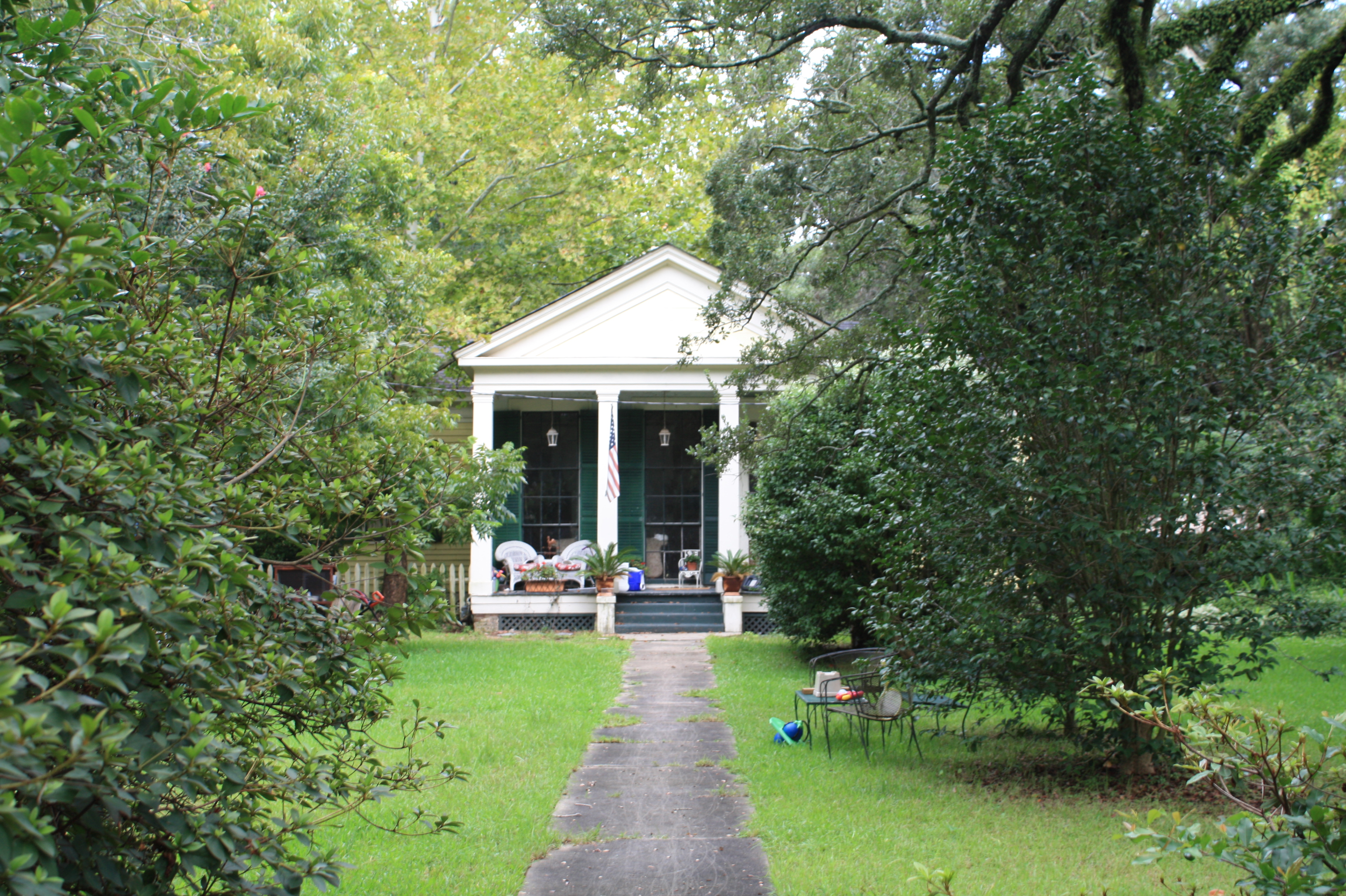
The house in its original location, photographed in 2009

The front portion of the house dates to 1871, and was built in Greek Revival style to mimic the older Oakleigh House. The three-bay façade has the front door with transom and sidelights in the rightmost bay, and unique triple-hung sash windows in the other two. The porch is recessed under a pedimented gable resting on boxed columns. The balustrade, with its shallow tail cut joints was likely transferred from the 1830s garçonnière. The gable of the original house is partially visible from the front.

The interior features a side hall, at the end of which are steps to the 1835 structure, which is raised 2 feet higher than the newer section. Adjoining the hall two parlors with original trimwork and black marble mantels. The 1835 portion features Federal-style mantels.
