= John Stuart (loyalist) =

British Indian Department officer and merchant (1718-1779)

John Stuart (25 September 1718 – 21 March 1779) was a British Indian Department officer and merchant. Active in the province of South Carolina, he was the superintendent for the Indian Department's southern district from 1761 to 1779; his northern counterpart was Sir William Johnson, who was based in the province of New York.

== Early life ==
Born in Inverness, Scotland, in 1718, by 1748 Stuart had emigrated to the British colony of South Carolina. There he worked as a merchant and became prominent in local affairs. In 1760 he served as a militia captain in the Anglo-Cherokee War (1759–1761). Stuart was captured by the Cherokee, but he was ransomed by Chief Attakullakulla and returned to South Carolina.

== Superintendent in the Indian Department ==
Captain Stuart's familiarity with Native Americans and the frontier earned his appointment in 1761 as superintendent in the British Indian Department. His role was to help Great Britain and the colonies bring order to their relations with the Southeast Indians (who became known as the "Five Civilized Tribes"). He also worked to prevent the organization of anti-British native confederations, such as the one that organized Pontiac's Rebellion in 1763.

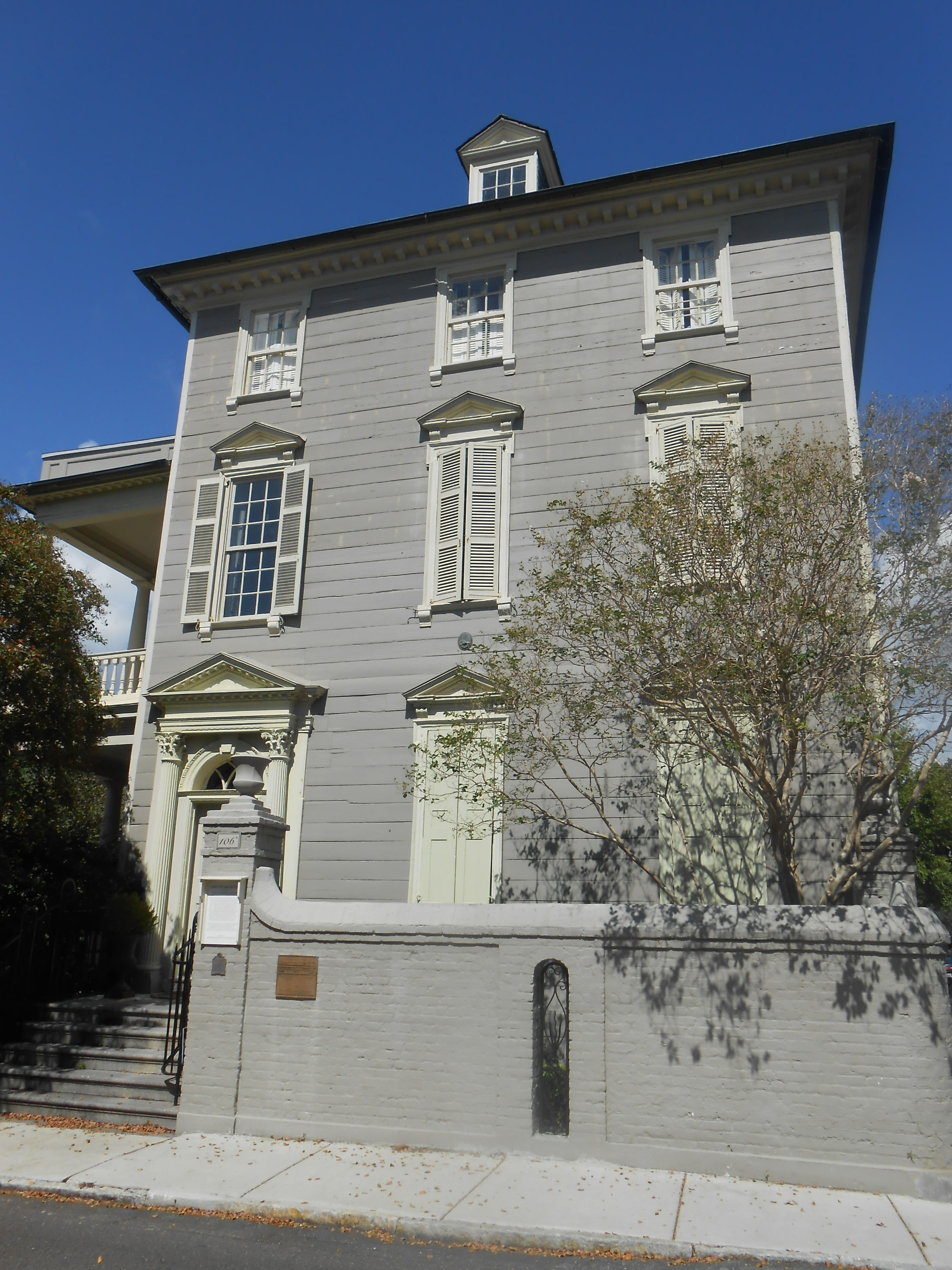
Col. Stuart lived at 106 Tradd Street, Charleston, South Carolina; his house is a National Historic Landmark.

In 1762 Stuart appointed Alexander Cameron as his deputy. Cameron had served at Fort Prince George during the Anglo-Cherokee War, and had long experience with and empathy for the Cherokee. They called him "Scotchie" and considered him one of the few white men they trusted. He helped build relations with the Southeast Indians and bring peace to the backcountry in the years before the American Revolutionary War.

=== American Revolutionary War ===
When the war broke out in 1775, most Native American leaders in Stuart and Cameron's area supported the British. In the summer of 1776, the Cherokee opened a series of concerted attacks against frontier settlements from Tennessee to central South Carolina, hoping to expel the colonists. Initially Stuart and Cameron tried to prevent the violence, but once the attacks began, they tried to prevent the Cherokee from attacking loyalists.

Revolutionaries in both Carolinas and Virginia petitioned the Continental Congress to raise a militia to "exterpate" [sic] the Cherokee. Eventually 6,000 militia troops were recruited from the three colonies under the overall command of Griffith Rutherford of North Carolina. While called the Rutherford Expedition, most of the Cherokee Towns were destroyed by forces commanded by Major Andrew Williamson of South Carolina.

Cameron and Cherokee allies led a successful ambush of Patriot militia led by Major Williamson at the Battle of Twelve Mile Creek on 1 August 1776 in western South Carolina. Williamson gathered reinforcements, however, and led several expeditions against the Cherokee, killing an estimated 2,000, and destroying half of their 62 towns.

During the war, Stuart fled to Georgia and then to Pensacola in the Loyalist colony of West Florida. He died there in 1779.

== Legacy and honors ==
Stuart's home, built in 1772 in Charleston, is now known as the Colonel John Stuart House and was named a U.S. National Historic Landmark in 1973.

== See also ==
- Anglo-Cherokee War (1759–1761)
- Cherokee-American wars (1776–1794)

== Bibliography ==
- O'Donnell, James H. III (2000). Stuart, John. doi:10.1093/anb/9780198606697.article.0100865.
