= John Stewart House =

John Stewart House may refer to:

- John Stewart House (Columbus, Georgia), listed on the National Register of Historic Places in Muscogee County, Georgia
- John Stewart Houses (Philadelphia, Pennsylvania), listed on the NRHP in Pennsylvania
- John Stewart House (Decatur, Tennessee), listed on the National Register of Historic Places in Meigs County, Tennessee

== See also ==
- John Stuart House (disambiguation)
- Stewart House (disambiguation)
