= Miller Reese Hutchison =

American electrical engineer and inventor (1876–1944)

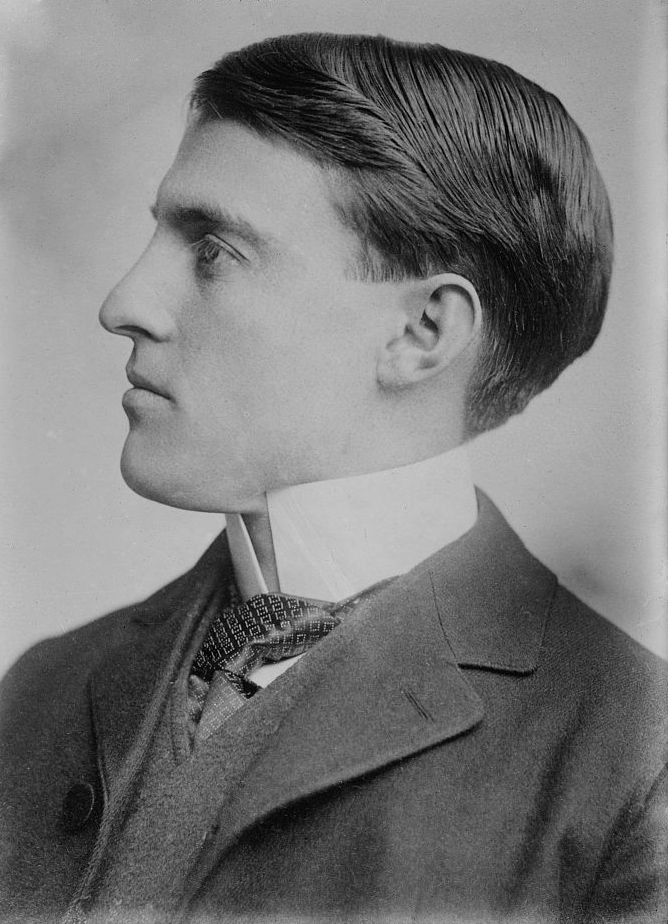
- Born: August 6, 1876; Montrose, Alabama
- Died: February 16, 1944 (aged 67); New York, New York
- Occupation: Inventor

Miller Reese Hutchison (August 6, 1876 – February 16, 1944) was an American electrical engineer and inventor. He developed some of the first portable electric devices, such as a vehicle horn and a hearing aid. His father was William Hutchison and mother born Tracie Elizabeth Magruder. He attended Marion Military Institute from 1889 through 1891, Spring Hill College 1891 through 1892, the University Military Institute in Mobile from 1892 through 1895, and graduated from Auburn University (then called Alabama Polytechnical Institute) in 1897. While still in school he invented and patented a lightning arrester for telegraph lines in 1895. At the outbreak of the Spanish–American War in 1898, he volunteered and was appointed engineer for the United States Lighthouse Board, laying cables and mines to protect harbors in the Gulf of Mexico.

== Hearing aids ==
Hutchison assembled an electrical hearing aid for one of his friends; it was called the "akouphone" when it was first developed around 1895. Hutchison's interest in the invention stemmed from a childhood friend, Lyman Gould, who was deaf from scarlet fever. Besides his training in engineering, Hutchison had attended classes at the Medical College of Alabama to study the anatomy of the ear. He formed the Akouphone Company in Alabama to market the device, but the original bulky tabletop form was not practical.

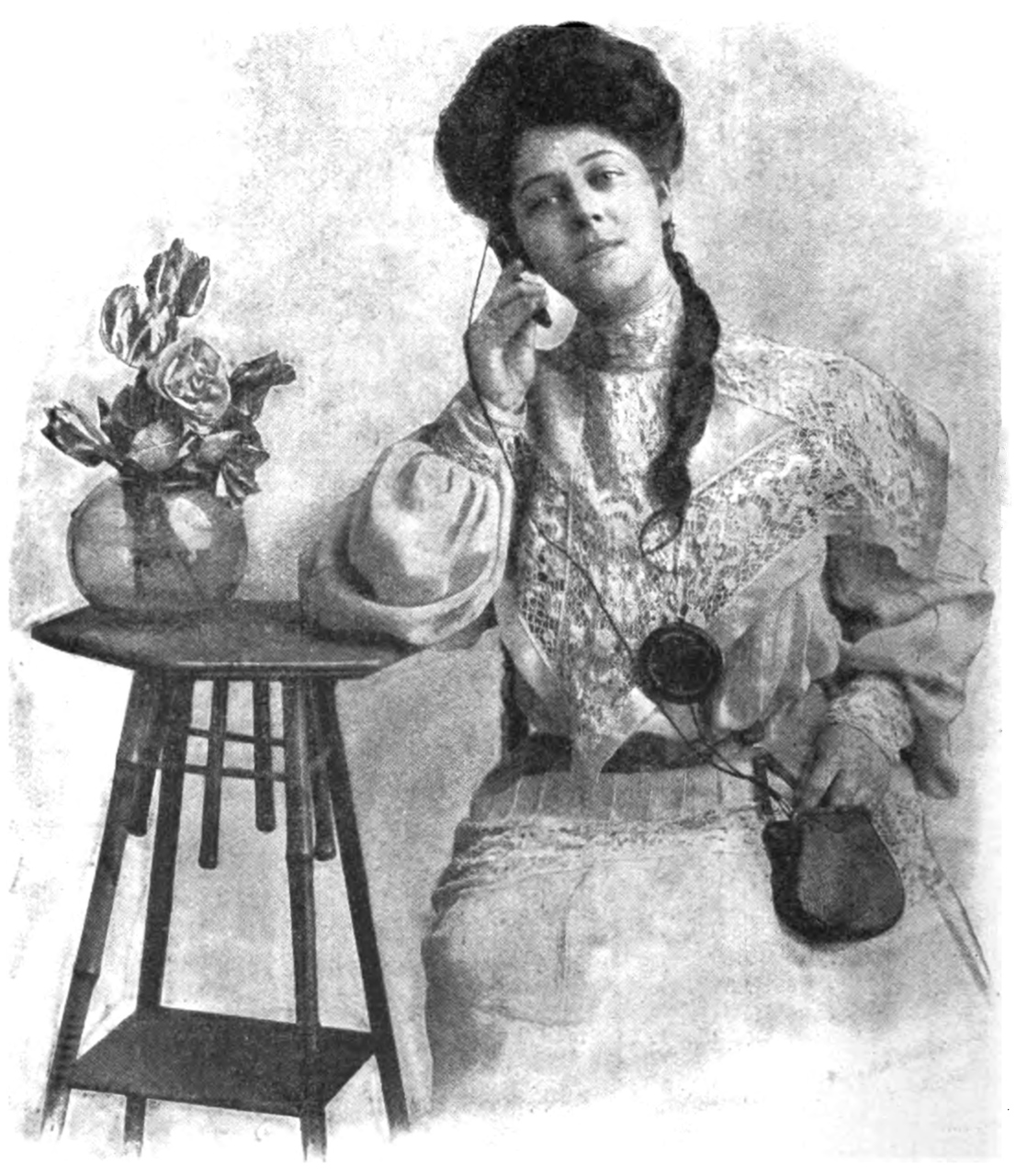
Portable Acousticon in 1906

After the Spanish–American War Hutchison went to Europe to promote his hearing aids. Several members of royal families were known to suffer from hereditary hearing loss. Queen Alexandra of Denmark was so happy with the results, she invited Hutchison to the coronation ceremony in 1902 when her husband became King Edward VII. Around this time he moved to New York City to continue improving the device and inventing others.

By 1902, he had refined the hearing aid into a more portable form powered by batteries, which he then called the Acousticon. The American press called the device a "miracle", and Hutchison helped by staging publicity events, such as having Metropolitan Opera lead singer Suzanne Adams photographed singing to formerly deaf people. He exhibited at the Louisiana Purchase Exposition, the world's fair in St. Louis, Missouri, in 1904. Medical experts discovered the device had several drawbacks. Frequency and dynamic range were limited, and those who had total hearing loss were not helped. Batteries were still bulky and need to be changed often. However it was still regarded as "the best electrical aid for the semi-deaf yet devised." He also developed related devices known as the Akou-Massage (renamed the Massacon), and Akoulalion, which converted audio into vibrations, to help those with more profound hearing loss. They were widely adopted by schools for the deaf in the US and Europe.

In 1905 Hutchison turned over the rights for the Acousticon to Kelley Monroe Turner (1859–1927). Turner would improve hearing aids (such as adding a volume control) and apply the technology to other products. One was the dictograph, which was an early hands-free inter-office intercom system. Turner's General Acoustic Company was renamed Dictograph Products Company because of the market success of the dictograph. One of the first electric eavesdropping devices was called the Detective Dictograph, announced in 1910. The carbon technology for hearing aids was used until the miniature vacuum tube replaced it in the 1940s. Advertisements in 1947 still carried the Acousticon brand name, and invoked Queen Alexandra's coronation image of 45 years earlier; model names were "Coronation" and "Imperial".

=== Other inventions ===
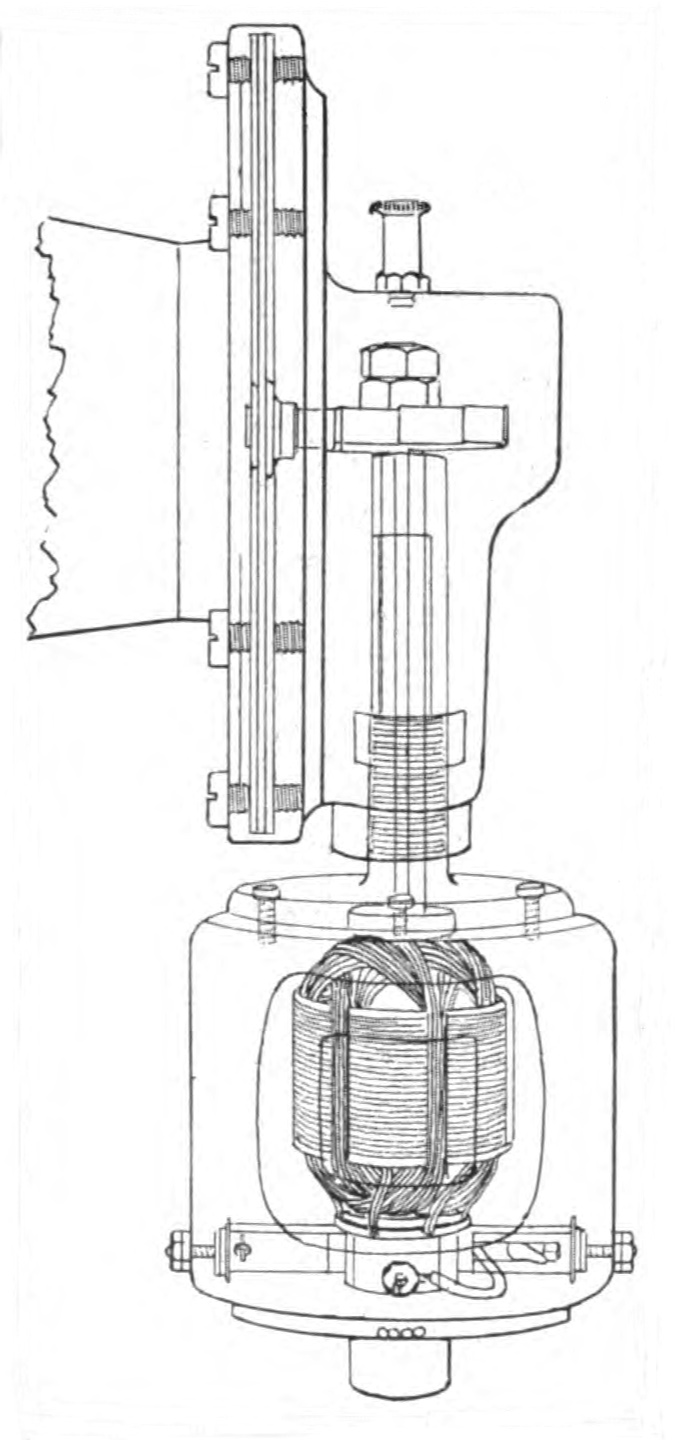
Electrical Klaxon horn in 1910

Hutchison was concerned with increased automobile traffic in New York City. An early version of a vehicle speed alarm was not readily adopted. Warning devices at the time were either bells or horns essentially derived from musical instruments. He realized that a more obnoxious sound would serve as a better warning. He designed a steel diaphragm with a pin at its center, driving the pin with a cam through either a hand crank or electric batteries via a small motor. The "horn" part of the device made the sound directional, so a pedestrian would be more likely to look in the direction of the oncoming vehicle. He licensed the patents to Lovell-McConnell Manufacturing Company in early 1908, and it was marketed as the Klaxon horn. The name came from the Greek word klaxo, meaning "shriek", which described its sound. At the January 1908 Importers' Automobile Salon in Madison Square Garden New York, mayor George B. McClellan Jr. was reported to have "the loudest automobile in New York" thanks to one of Hutchison's klaxons. A common quip, sometimes attributed to Mark Twain, was that Miller had invented the Klaxon to deafen people so they would have to wear his Acousticon.

Hutchison himself had a limousine custom-built in May 1908 to showcase the latest in automotive electrical technology. The Witherbee Igniter Company installed storage batteries that could be re-charged from an on-board generator, or by plugging into a light socket. The car was equipped with three Klaxon horns and an external speaker to warn other traffic. An intercom similar to the dictograph allowed passengers to talk with the chauffeur. Many of the novel innovations in his vehicle are standard equipment to-day. Besides headlights with a dashboard switch, interior lamps lit automatically when doors were opened. The dashboard included alarms and lighted gauges, to indicate dangerous conditions. The car featured audible and visual back-up warning mechanisms.

By the next year Lovell-McConnell was shipping the horns throughout the US and opened offices in Europe. They reportedly sent a gold-plated Klaxon for the British royal limousine. Lovell-McConnell tried to keep prices high through contracts that prohibited discounting. However, competitors quickly came out with cheap imitations. Hutchison obtained further patents on improvements and fought the other horn vendors. During a series of lawsuits for patent infringement, an 1899 patent by Alexander N. Pierman for a bicycle horn was used as an example of a similar product with only a slightly different use. Federal judge Thomas Chatfield of the United States District Court for the Eastern District of New York ruled in favor of Hutchison. In an appeal and other cases, however, Alfred Conkling Coxe Sr. generally ruled that Hutchison's claims were overly broad, and thus invalidated many of them. Coxe called the horn's sound "harsh, raucous, and diabolical". Lawyers said "a noise is not patentable". The United Motors Company bought out Lovell-McConnell in 1916, renamed it Klaxon Company, and soon made the horns standard on General Motors cars.

Klaxon alarm
Klaxon used by United States Navy submarines during World War II

By 1908 Hutchison had developed an electrical tachometer that would give an accurate reading of the speed of steam ship engines. Previously, ship speed was judged by spinning shafts that were mechanically connected to the propellers. The innovation of using a simple generator and voltmeter allowed much more precise control, and using wires the speed could be displayed remotely in the pilot house or captain's stateroom as well as engine room. The device even allowed speeds to be measured when the ship's engines were reversed. It was licensed to Industrial Instrument Company for production.

Hutchison became associated with Thomas Edison from 1909, and was chief engineer of Edison's laboratory in West Orange, New Jersey, from August 1912 until July 1918. In June 1913 he was awarded an honorary Electrical Engineer degree from Auburn, and in June 1914 an honorary Ph.D. from Spring Hill College.

Hutchison also developed technology for use by the military. The Klaxon warning device became standard equipment on all United States Navy ships. During World War I he worked on batteries for submarines in Edison's laboratory. After experimental batteries caused an explosion of hydrogen gas on the USS E-2, Hutchison was accused of making false statements in a Navy inquiry.

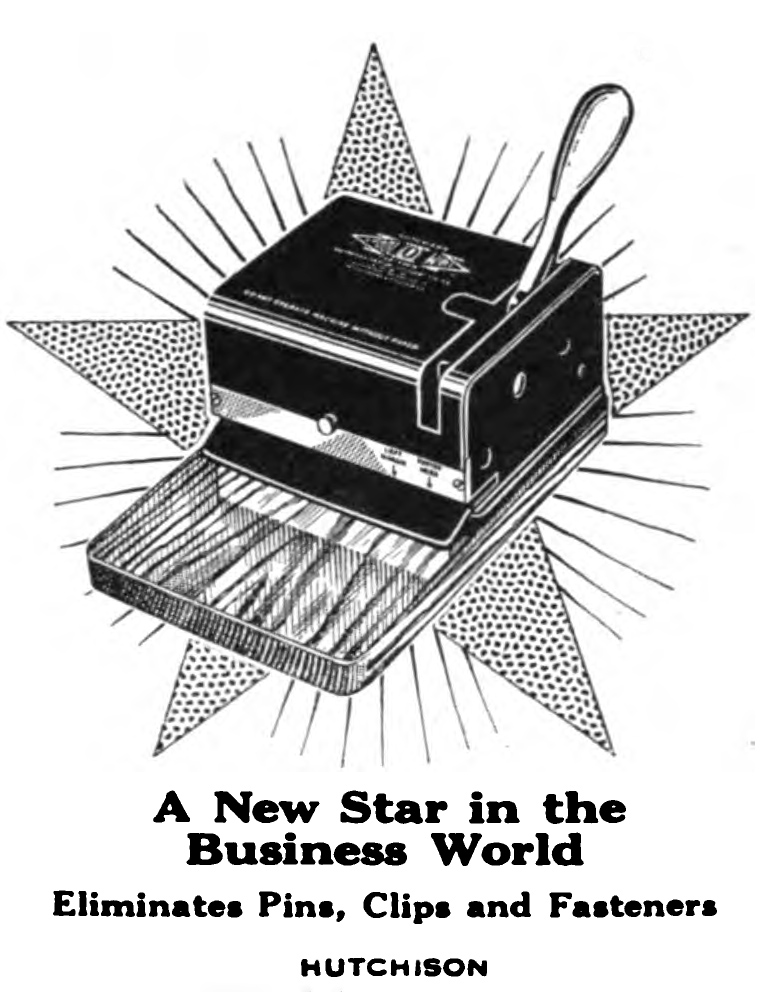
Spool-O-Wire fastener machine advertised in 1920

In 1918 he left Edison's lab. to devote full-time to his own company: Miller Reese Hutchison Incorporated, which had been formed in 1916 to further develop and sell batteries developed at Edison's laboratory. After World War I he founded Hutchison Office Specialties Company for the new market of electric business machines. One popular product was the "Spool-O-Wire" fastener machine. As its name implied, it used a continuous spool of wire to attach business documents to each other. It was advertised as handling from two to forty sheets of paper, cloth, or cardboard, with a single wire spool replacing 15,000 individual staples.

In 1921 he demonstrated a gun that could be used for embedding a projectile into steel at a precise velocity. The dramatic demonstration was presented in his offices high in the Woolworth Building of Lower Manhattan. He proposed using it to replace rivets for repairing ships underwater, while the press speculated on military uses as a weapon.

Another danger caused by the increased number of automobiles was carbon monoxide (CO). Motorists would sometimes pass out or die in high-traffic tunnels, for example, from the odorless gas. In 1924 he announced an additive to gasoline that would allow cleaner combustion with fewer harmful fumes. The additive was marketed as Hutch-Olene, but never caught on. After his second son was killed in an airplane crash in 1928, he became motivated to improve the safety of air travel. In 1930 he announced a forerunner of today's oxygen sensor called the Moto-Vita. It was a crude measurement of the unburned vapors that allowed a pilot (or driver of an automobile) to adjust the air-fuel ratio for both better efficiency and lower dangerous CO emissions. In 1936 he was admitted to Alabama's hall of fame, with his number of patents estimated to be over 1000.

== Family and death ==
Hutchison married Martha Jackman Pomeroy of Minnetonka, Minnesota, in New York on May 31, 1901. Their children were: Miller Reese Hutchison (born 1902), Harold Pomeroy Hutchison (born 1904), Juan Ceballo Hutchison (born 1906), and Robley Pomeroy Hutchison (born 1908). Miller Reese Hutchinson Snr. died suddenly on February 16, 1944, in New York City. He has been called "one of Alabama's greatest contributions to science and invention".
