= Dr. Richard and Paulina Stuart House =

Historic house in Iowa, United States

- U.S. National Register of Historic Places
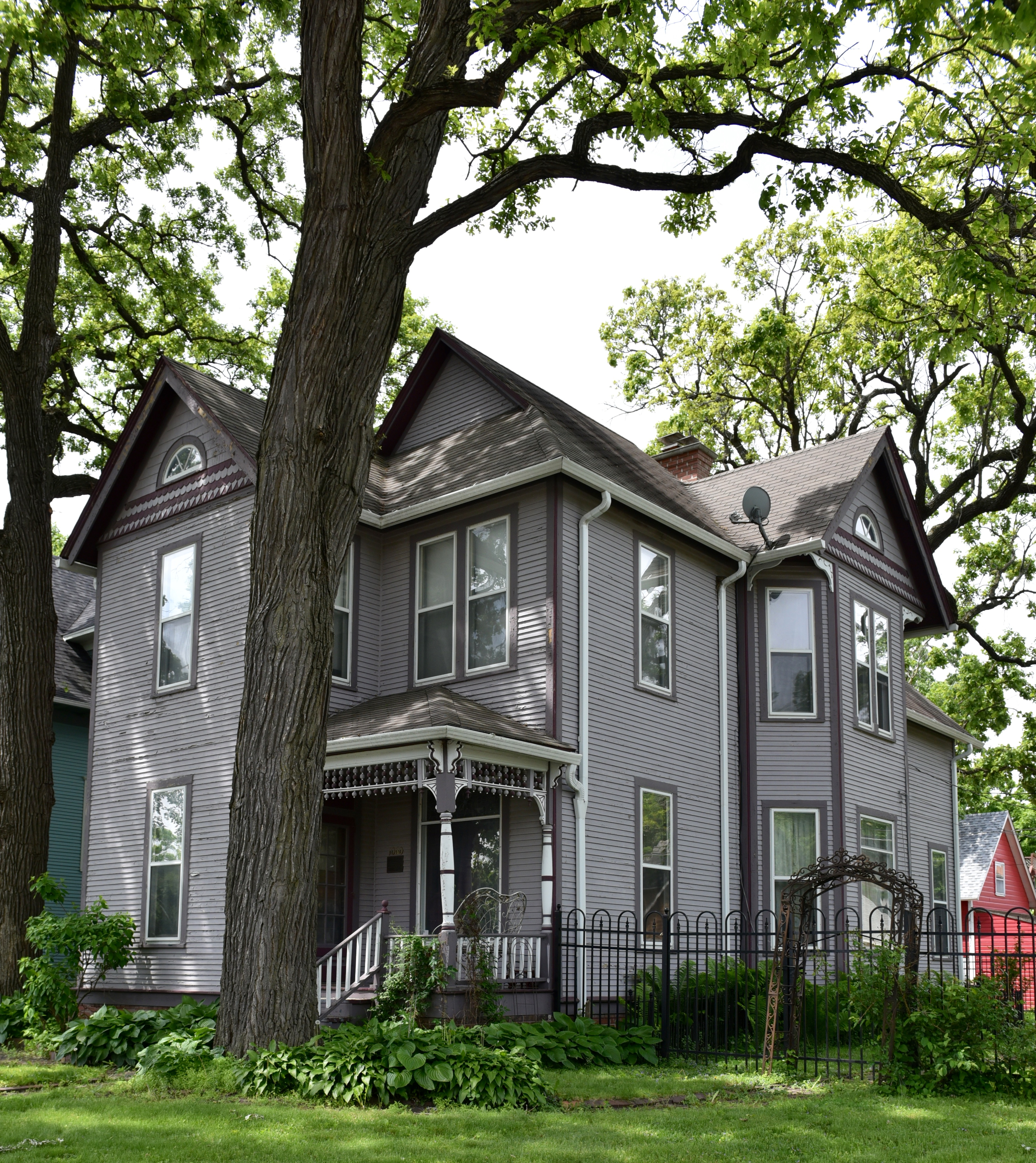

- Location within Iowa Location within the United States
- Location: 1060 25th St., Des Moines, Iowa
- Coordinates: 41°35′49.2″N 93°39′04.7″W
- Area: less than one acre
- Built: 1895
- Architectural style: Late Victorian
- MPS: Drake University and Related Properties in Des Moines, Iowa, 1881--1918 MPS
- NRHP reference No.: 88001330
- Added to NRHP: September 8, 1988

The Dr. Richard and Paulina Stuart House is a historic building located in Des Moines, Iowa, United States. This 2½-story frame dwelling follows an irregular plan and features a hipped roof, gablet, and various gables. The property on which it stands is one of ten plats that were owned by Drake University. The house's significance is attributed to the effect of the university's innovative financing techniques upon the settlement of the area around the campus. The property was bought by Mary A. Scott and her husband in 1889 from E.N. Curl, a stockholder in the University Land Company. They sold part of the lot in 1891 to Dr. Richard and Paulina D. Stuart. The house was built by 1895. The Stuarts continued to own the property until 1907. The house was listed on the National Register of Historic Places in 1988.
