= Cross-wing =

Section of a building

A cross-wing is an addition to a house, at right angles to the original block of a house, usually with a gable. A cross-wing plan is an architectural plan reflecting this; cross-wing architecture describes the style.

James Stevens Curl, in A Dictionary of Architecture and Landscape Architecture, defines it as a "Wing attached to the hall-range of a medieval house, its axis at right angles to the hall-range, and often gabled."

Cross-wing plans have been used in other eras. For example, during the settlement period in Utah in the late 1800s, original small hall-and-parlor plan houses, often built in vernacular Classical Revival style, were sometimes extended by the addition of a Victorian-style cross-wing.
