= Stewart Ranch =

- Stewart Ranch buildings: Barnard J. Stewart Ranch House; Charles B. Stewart Ranch House; Samuel W. Stewart Ranch House; Stewart Ranch Foreman's House; Stewart–Hewlett Ranch Dairy Barn; Lester F. and Margaret Stewart Hewlett Ranch House; Ethelbert White and William M. Stewart Ranch House
- U.S. National Register of Historic Places
- Location within Utah Location within the United States
- Nearest city: Woodland, Utah
- Coordinates: 40°33′23″N 111°08′08″W
- Area: less than one acre
- Built: 190x, 190x, 1934
- MPS: Stewart Ranch TR
- NRHP reference No.: 64000874
- Added to NRHP: May 23, 1985

Stewart Ranch, also known as Stewart-Hewlett Ranch, near Woodland, Utah in Wasatch and Summit counties, includes eight buildings which were separately listed on the National Register of Historic Places in 1985. The former ranch is located off Utah State Route 35. Some or all of the ranch is included in what is now the Diamond Bar X Ranch.

Stewart Ranch was a "recreational ranch" established around 1902 in Pine Valley, a mountain valley along the North Fork of the Provo River in the western side of the Uintah Mountains, about 60 miles (97 km) east of Salt Lake City, Utah. All but one of the buildings are in Wasatch County, east of the Provo River, across which lies Summit County.

William M. Stewart visited the valley in 1900 and purchased 160 acres (0.65 km^{2}). With purchases by a total of four Stewart brothers the ranch eventually was 2,262 acres (9.15 km^{2}) in size. The ranch was bought in 1931 by in-laws, the Hewletts, who built a dairy barn and otherwise made changes.

"Included among the eight buildings are the ranch homes of the four Stewart brothers who founded the ranch, the ranch homes of the two Hewlett brothers, in-law relations of the Stewarts who purchased the ranch in 1931, the ranch foreman's house, and the dairy barn. There are a number of other structures and buildings on the ranch which are not included in the nomination because they either have been altered, constructed within the past 50 years, or lack significant historical associations."

"Stewart Ranch is located in Pine Valley, a small mountain valley on the western edge of the Uinta Mountains, approximately 60 miles east of Salt Lake City. The valley, which runs generally north and south, is two or three miles in length, several hundred yards wide, and consists of a combination of open meadow lands and forested areas. The North Fork of the Provo River runs the length of the valley and converges with the South Fork at the southern end of the valley. Also extending the length of the valley is a dirt road which passes through a series of fences and gates that mark some of the current property lines."

"The eight significant buildings that are included in the Stewart Ranch Thematic Resources nomination are as follows:

- Ethelbert White/William M. Stewart Ranch House (1890)
- Barnard J. Stewart Ranch House (1911)
- Samuel W. Stewart Ranch House (1913)
- Charles B. Stewart Ranch House (1918)
- Stewart Ranch Foreman's House (1929-30)
- Lester F. Hewlett Ranch House (1912?)
- Verner Hewlett Ranch House (1929-30)
- Stewart-Hewlett Ranch Dairy Barn (1935)

There are three other houses on the ranch which, though not yet 50 years old, may be eligible for future nomination to the Register because they were constructed during the second and final period of the ranch's significance as a recreational ranch. They are listed below.

- Isaac M. Stewart Summer Home (c. 1941)
- Junius M. and Ruth Stewart Romney Summer Home (1946)
- Harold F. and Madelyn Stewart Silver Summer Home (1946)"

== Ethelbert White and William M. Stewart Ranch House ==
40°33′29″N 111°08′05″W

This is a one-story gabled log cabin built in 1890, probably by Ethelbert White. It was moved from its original location at the north end of the valley to the southern end, around 1932.

It was a home of Salt Lake City-based educator William M. Stewart, who served 25 years at the University of Utah, including assisting the rise of the Stewart School, which trained teachers. William M. Stewart's main residence, the house at 1133 E. 300 South, Salt Lake City, is the house most associated with his life and career, and was still standing in 1985. That SLC house was included as a contributing building in the University Neighborhood Historic District, NRHP-listed in 1995.

The listed area is less than one acre, and the reference number is 85001140.

== Barnard J. Stewart Ranch House ==
40°34′00″N 111°07′57″W

This is a one-and-a-half-story log house built in 1911 in Craftsman, bungalow style. It was designed by Barnard J. and Leonora Cannon Stewart, with Leonora insisting upon Victorian details, and it was built by Hyrum Jensen, a Salt Lake contractor early in his career.

The listing, with refnum=85001136, included three additional contributing buildings on 8 acres (3.2 ha). These are two outhouses and a c.1928 woodhouse built from boards, windows and door of a c.1895 homesteader cabin which collapsed under weight of snow a year before.

== Charles B. Stewart Ranch House ==
(#85001137) Off State Route 35 40°34′48″N 111°07′32″W

== Samuel W. Stewart Ranch House ==
(#85001138) Off State Route 35 40°33′26″N 111°08′05″W

== Stewart Ranch Foreman's House ==
(#85001135) Off State Route 35 40°33′28″N 111°08′06″W

== Stewart–Hewlett Ranch Dairy Barn ==
40.556256°N 111.136300°W area = less than one acre mpsub = Stewart Ranch TR refnum = 85001139 The dairy barn was built in 1934. This is a two-and-a-half-story wood frame barn with a gambrel roof, built upon a concrete foundation in 1934. It has vertical board and batten siding. The barn is about 34 by 150 feet (10 m × 46 m) in plan. Its original shingles were eventually replaced by metal roofing. A large shed-roofed milking barn was added as a lean-to on the west side in 1941, but collapsed under heavy snowload in the 1950s or 1960s, and was replaced by a smaller lean-to later.

== Lester F. and Margaret Stewart Hewlett Ranch House ==
40°34′45″N 111°07′34″W

== Verner O. Hewlett Ranch House ==
40.553869°N 111.164055°W Only one, out of eight here, shown in National Register of Historic Places listings in Summit County, Utah, which seems to be correct based on GeoGroup view of all eight's coordinates and the Provo River which makes the county border.

Built in 1929 by Frank Turnbull. It is a variation on Bungalow architecture in style. 1.7 acres (0.69 ha)

One-and-a-half-story log house with gable wings cross-wings crosswings cross-wings.
