= Pine Valley (Missouri) =

Valley in Missouri, United States

Coordinates: 37.1086606°N 90.9967926°W

Pine Valley is a valley in Reynolds County in the U.S. state of Missouri.

Pine Valley was so named on account of pine timber within the valley.
