= Montrose Historic District (Montrose, Alabama) =

Historic district in Alabama, United States

- U.S. National Register of Historic Places
- U.S. Historic district
- Alabama Register of Landmarks and Heritage
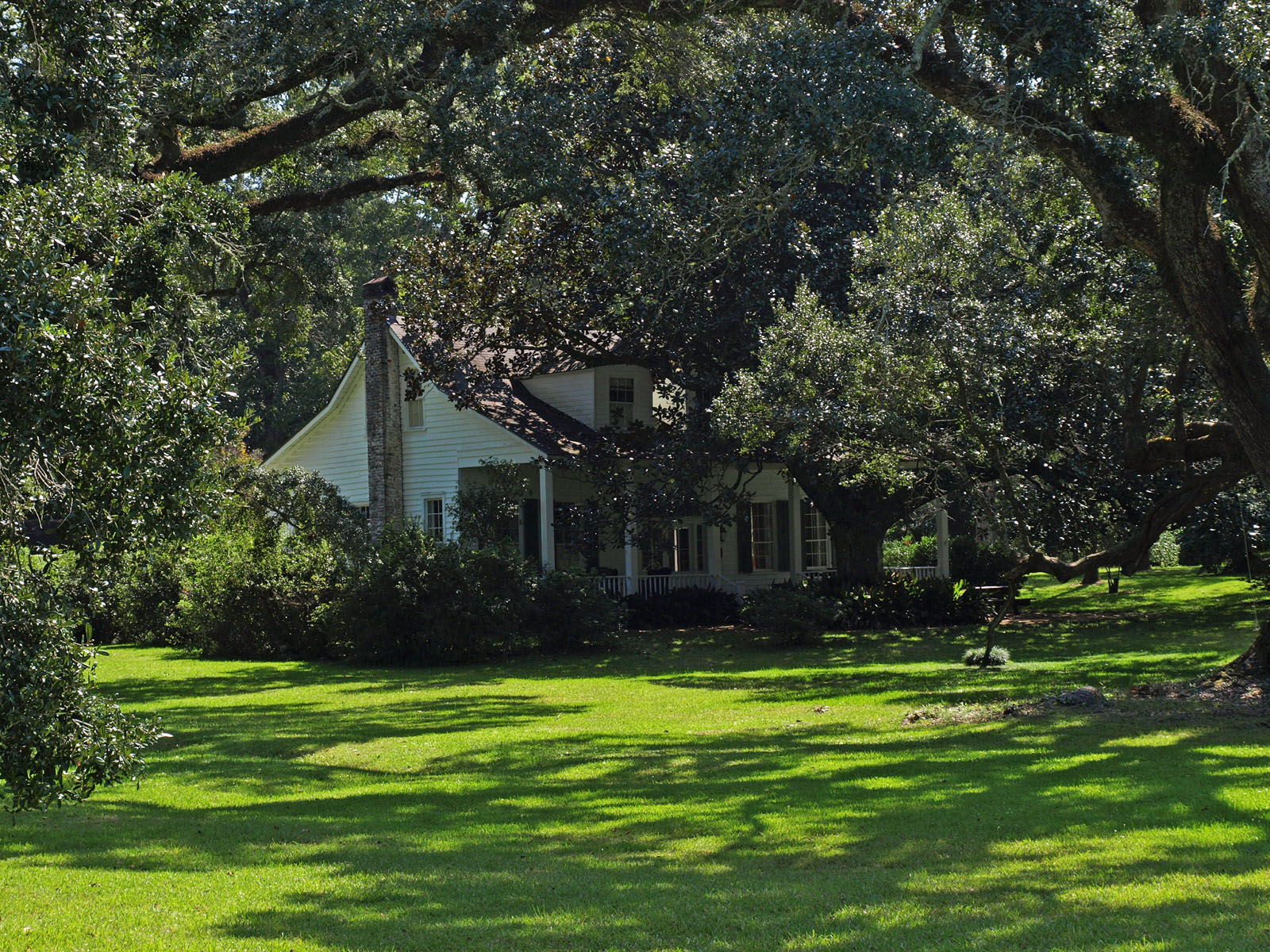
- The Chapman-Scott House, a Creole cottage house in the historic district

- Location within Alabama Location within the United States
- Location: Main (AL 42) and 2nd Sts., Montrose, Alabama
- Coordinates: 30°34′7″N 87°54′2″W
- Area: 79 acres (32 ha)
- Architectural style: Creole Cottage
- NRHP reference No.: 76000310

Significant dates
- Added to NRHP: June 3, 1976
- Designated ARLH: July 30, 1975

The Montrose Historic District is a historic district comprising fifteen historically significant buildings in the community of Montrose, Alabama, United States. The district is almost entirely residential, with the exception of the 1890 Montrose Post Office. Montrose is located on the eastern shore of Mobile Bay, and several homes in the district occupy bayfront lots. Nine of the homes in the district were designed in the Creole cottage style, a vernacular architectural style popular in the Gulf Coast states. The Creole cottage homes in the district all feature front facades with five bays and recessed full-length front porches supported by square or chamfered columns. Many of the houses were built as summer homes for residents of Mobile, for whom Montrose was a popular vacation destination.

The district was added to the National Register of Historic Places on June 3, 1976.

== List of structures ==
The historical district contains 27 notable structures. The structures are listed in no particular order.

- Lewis-Thomasson House (Bay Lot 16); built c. 1856, “Creole cottage”.
- Thomas Bullock House (Bay Lot 15, east half); built c. 1940.
- McCullough-Garnett House (Bay Lot 15, west half); built c. 1850, “Creole cottage”.
- Stanford House (Bay Lot 14, northeast); built late 1920s.
- Brainard-Breckenridge House (Bay Lot 14, southwest); built c. 1855, “Creole cottage”.
- Ledyard-Anderson-Moses House (Bay Lot 13); built 1853.
- Anderson-Phillips House (Bay Lot 12); built c. 1870, “Creole cottage”.
- Kearly House (Bay Lot 11, northwest); built mid-19th century, moved from Mobile in 1950.
- Humphries House (Bay Lot 11, northeast); built 1930.
- Fell-Hollinger-Bullock House (southeast corner Main at Chapman); built mid-1850s, “Creole cottage”.
- Jacobs House (Main Street, Block 4, Lot 1, east side); built 1950.
- Davis House (Chapman Street, Block 4, Lot 1, west side); built 1975.
- Randal-Wachter House (Main Street, Block 4, Lot 2); built 1910.
- Chapman-Scott House (Main Street, Block 4, Lot 1); built 1855, “Creole cottage”.
- Montrose Post Office (Main Street, Block 4, Lot 1); built 1895.
- Danzler House (Second Street, Block 14, Lot 3, south side); built 1960.
- Jay House (Second Street, Block 14, Lot 3, northside); built 1967.
- Thomson-Malone House (Second Street, Block 14, Lot 2); built 1904.
- Gray Cottage (Second Street, Block 14, Lot 1, south side); built 1860s.
- Brewer-Allen Boarding House (Second Street, Block 14, Lot 1, north side; now the Rudt House); built 1855.
- McIntyre-Kennedy House (Main Street, Block 6, Lot 2); built 1855, “Creole cottage”.
- Loftus-Thimbes House (Main Street, Block 6, Lot 1); built 1898, “Creole cottage”.
- J.V. Cummings House (Main Street, Block 5, Lot 2); built c. 1940.
- E.W. Winslow House (Main and Adams, Block 5, Lot 1); built c. 1935.
- James Miller House (Adams Street, Block 5, Lot 1, center); built c. 1950.
- Ed Leak House (Northeast corner Adams and Second); built 1955.
- McFall House (Second Street, Block 5, Lot 2); built 1930.
