= Stewart House (Little Rock, Arkansas) =

Historic house in Arkansas, United States

- U.S. National Register of Historic Places
- U.S. Historic district – Contributing property
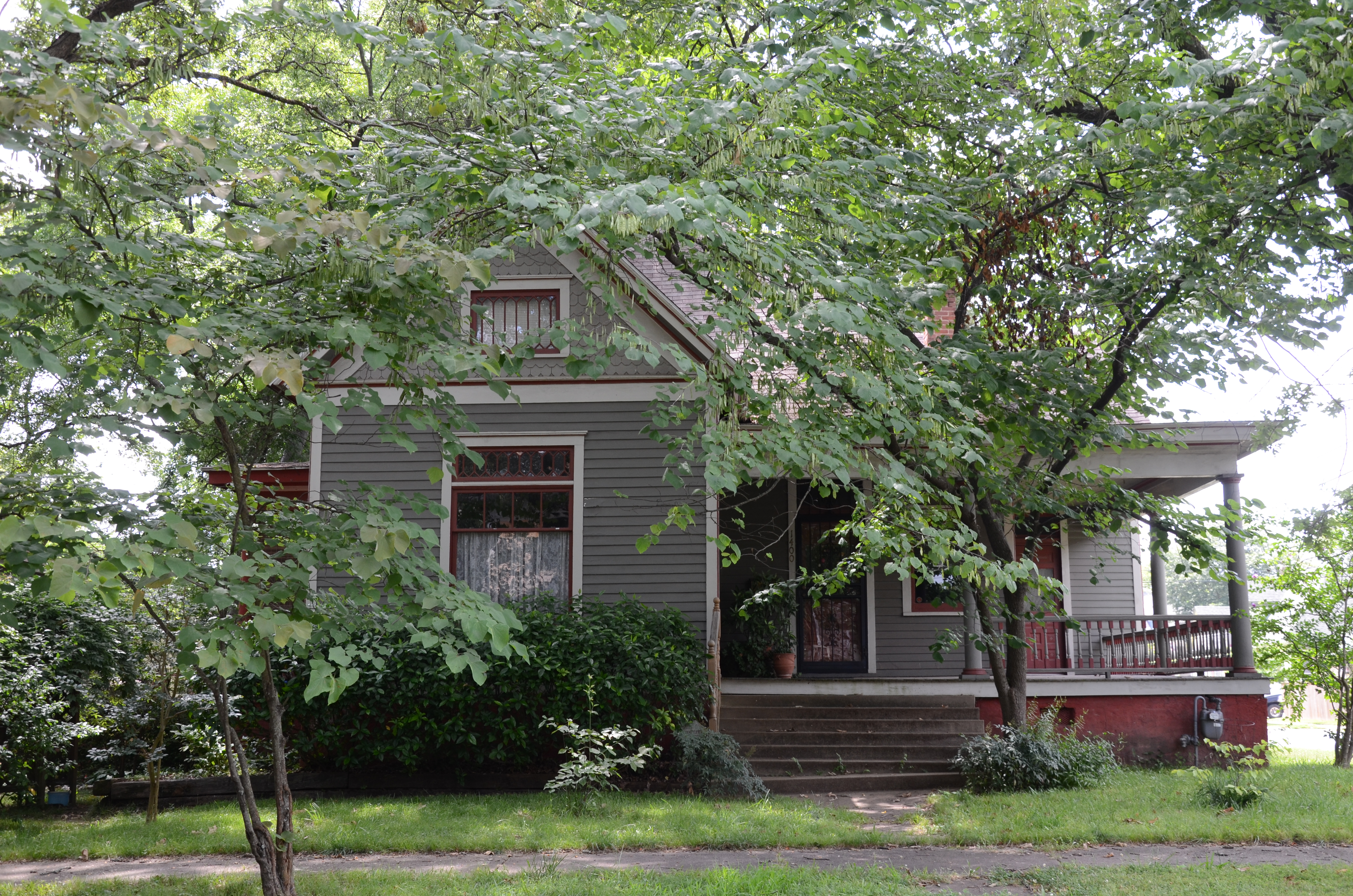

- Location within Arkansas Location within the United States
- Location: 1406 Summit St., Little Rock, Arkansas
- Coordinates: 34°44′13″N 92°17′43″W
- Area: less than one acre
- Built: 1900
- Architect: Charles L. Thompson
- Architectural style: Colonial Revival
- Part of: Central High School Neighborhood Historic District (ID96000892)
- MPS: Thompson, Charles L., Design Collection TR
- NRHP reference No.: 82000930

Significant dates
- Added to NRHP: December 22, 1982
- Designated CP: August 16, 1996

The Stewart House is a historic house at 1406 Summit Street in Little Rock, Arkansas. It is a 1 1/2-story wood-frame structure, with a distinctive blend of Queen Anne and Colonial Revival styling. It was built about 1910 to a design by Arkansas architect Charles L. Thompson. Its asymmetric massing, with a high hipped roof and projecting gables, is typically Queen Anne, as are elements of the front porch. Its Ionic columns and dentillate cornice are Colonial Revival.

The house was listed on the National Register of Historic Places in 1982.

== See also ==
- National Register of Historic Places listings in Little Rock, Arkansas
