= Old Dauphin Way Historic District =

Historic district in Alabama, United States

- U.S. National Register of Historic Places
- U.S. Historic district
- Location within Mobile, Alabama Location within Alabama Location within the United States
- Location: Roughly bounded by Springhill Ave., Broad, Government, and Houston Sts., Mobile, Alabama
- Coordinates: 30°41′14.24″N 88°4′7.10″W
- Area: 766 acres (310 ha)
- Built: 1830
- Architect: 19th and 20th century revivals, Late Victorian
- Architectural style: Late 19th And 20th Century Revivals, Late Victorian, Bungalow-Craftsman
- NRHP reference No.: 84000686 (original); 100007800 (increase)

Significant dates
- Added to NRHP: August 30, 1984
- Boundary increase: June 17, 2022

The Old Dauphin Way Historic District is a historic district in the city of Mobile, Alabama, United States. It was named for Dauphin Way, now known as Dauphin Street, which bisects the center of the district from east to west. The district is roughly bounded by Broad Street on the east, Springhill Avenue on the north, Government Street on the south, and Houston Avenue on the west. Covering 766 acres (3.10 km^{2}) and containing 1466 contributing buildings, Old Dauphin Way is the largest historic district in Mobile.

Although most of the district contains working-class frame houses, large and ornate mansions are found along the main thoroughfares. The contributing buildings range in age from the mid-19th to the early 20th century. Architectural styles include Greek Revival, Gothic Revival, Italianate, Queen Anne, Colonial Revival, Tudor Revival, and American Foursquare.

== History ==
The Old Dauphin Way District is situated on portions of what was once the Price and Espejo tracts, early Spanish land grants to the west of colonial Mobile. The area began to first be developed during the 1830s and 1840s. This early development mostly comprised residential estates along the roads leading from downtown to the village of Spring Hill. These included Spring Hill Road (now Spring Hill Avenue), Spring Hill Shell Road (now Old Shell Road), and Dauphin Way (now Dauphin Street). The district was placed on the National Register of Historic Places on August 30, 1984.

Examples of architecture within the Old Dauphin Way Historic District

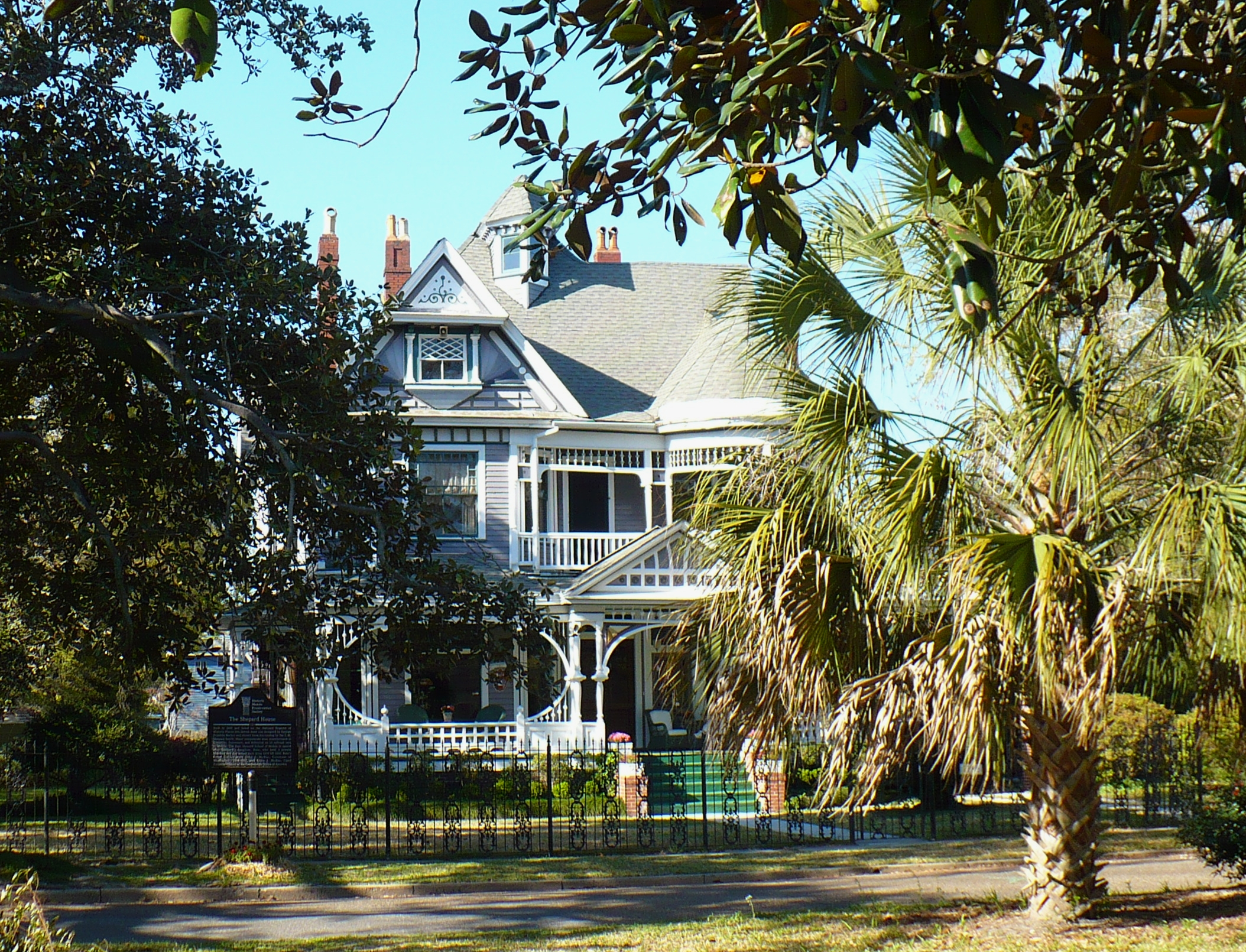
Shepard House at 1552 Monterey Place, also originally known as Monterey Place, built in the Queen Anne-style in 1897

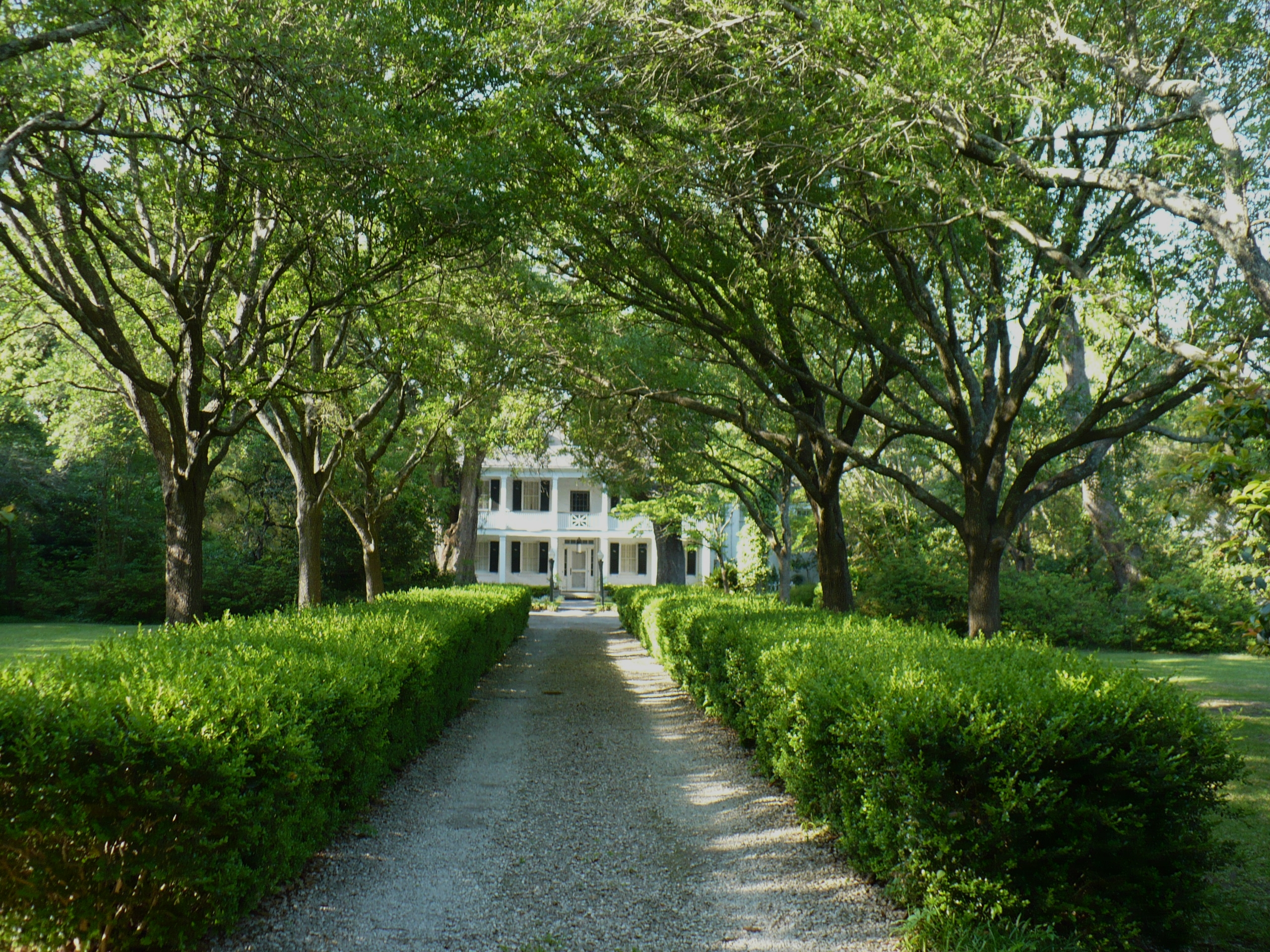
"Canebreak" at 1406 Brown Street, built in the Colonial Revival-style in 1930 to replace an earlier antebellum house that burned

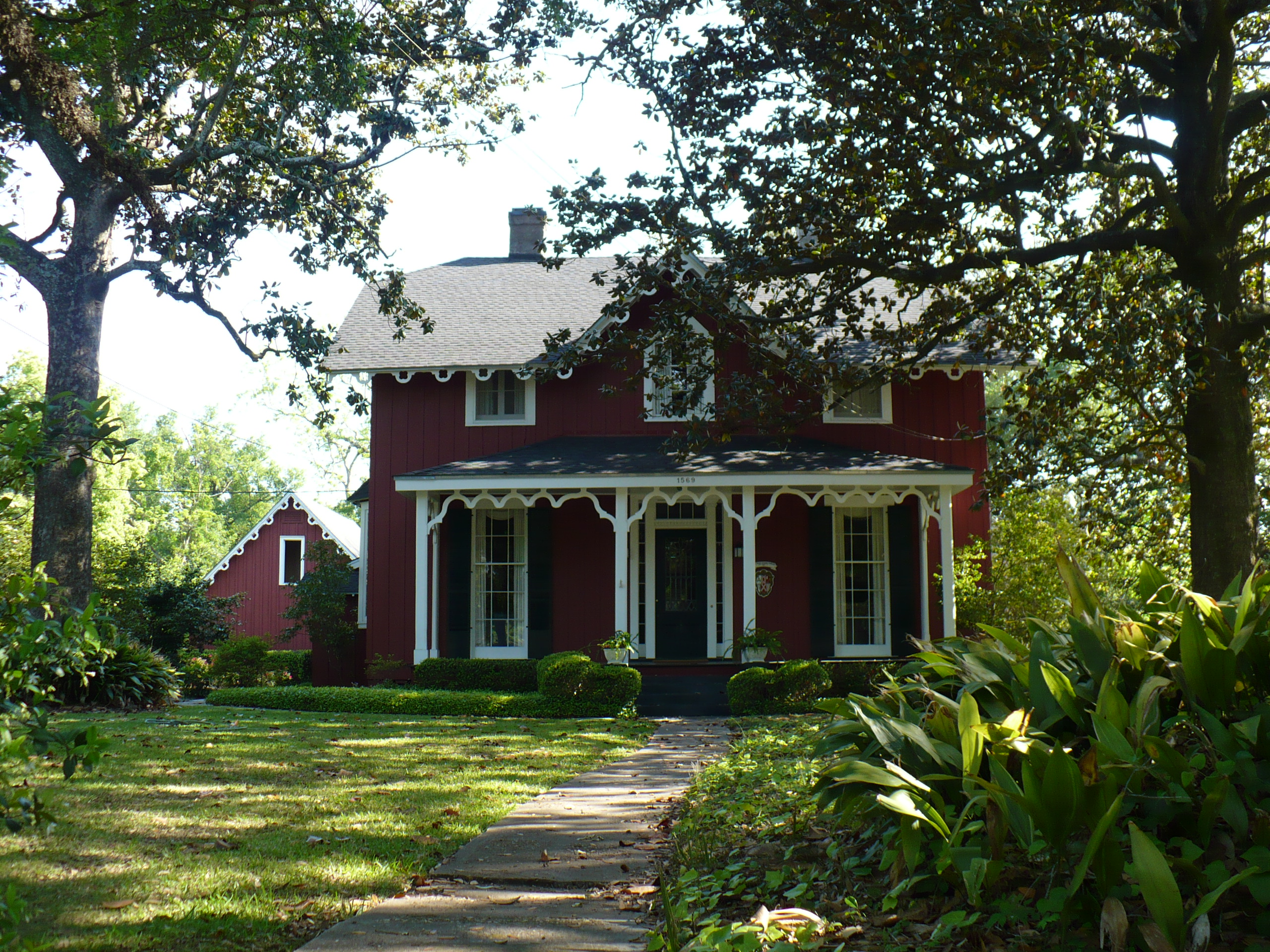
R.C. Macy House at 1569 Dauphin Street, built in the Gothic Revival style in 1867

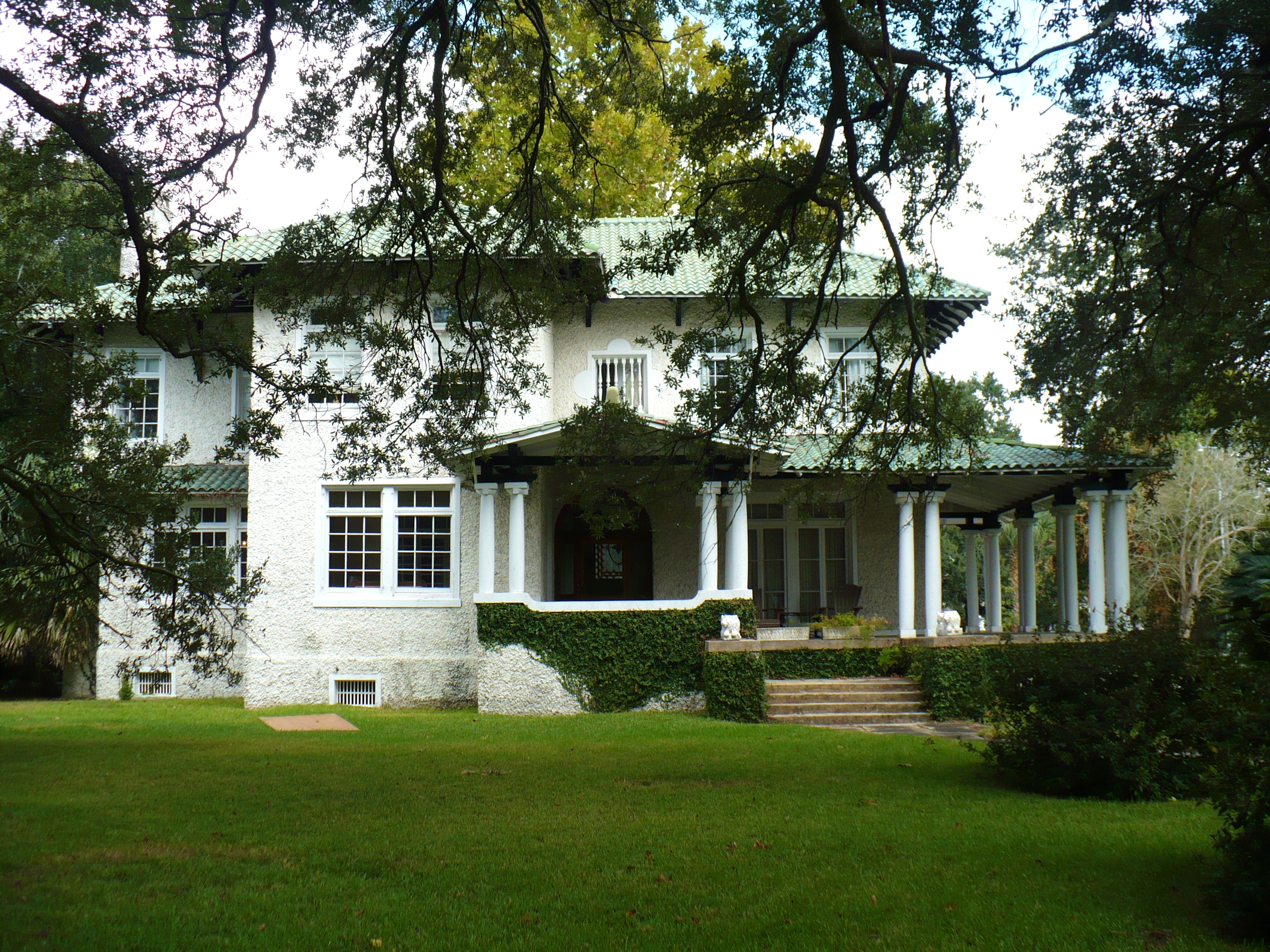
Mission Revival-style house built in 1905 at 1802 Old Government Street

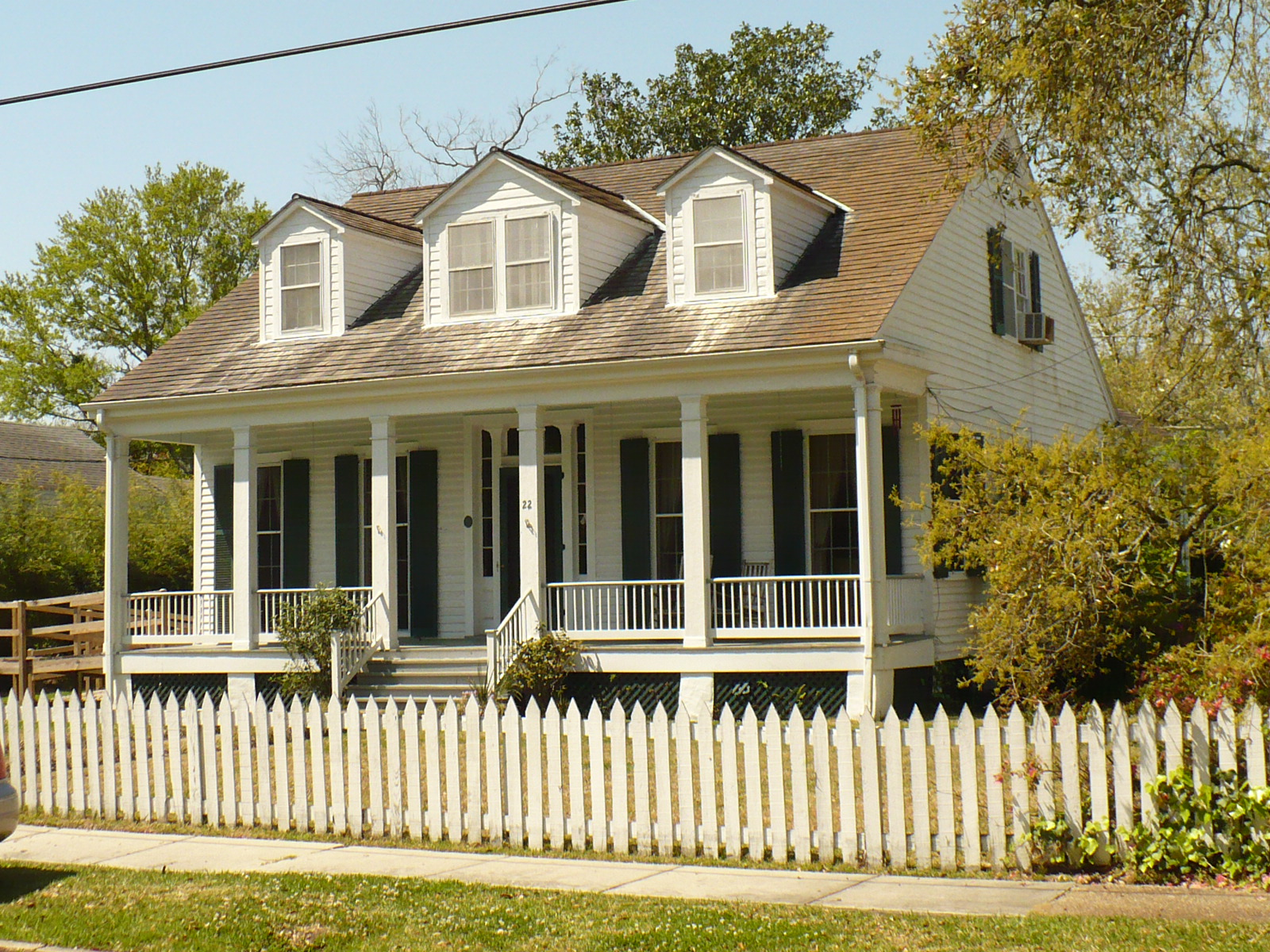
Dorgan Cottage, a Creole cottage built in 1860 at 22 South Lafayette Street

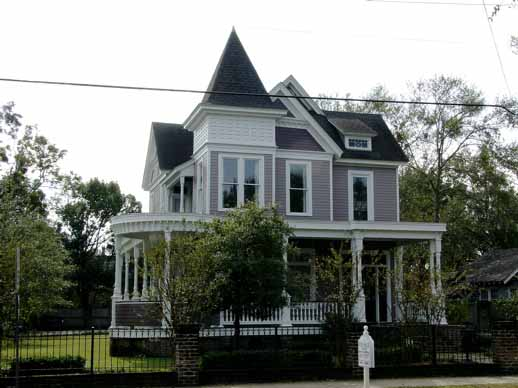
Cameron-Sanders House, built in the Queen Anne-style in 1894 at 1001 Dauphin Street
