= The Poet of Tolstoy Park =

2005 book by Sonny Brewer

- Author: Sonny Brewer
- Language: English
- Genre: Biographical novel
- Publisher: Ballantine
- Publication date: 2005
- Publication place: United States
- Pages: 254
- ISBN: 978-0-345-47631-9
- OCLC: 57706901
- Dewey Decimal: 813/.6 22
- LC Class: PS3602.R48 P64 2005
- Followed by: A Sound Like Thunder

The Poet of Tolstoy Park is the 2005 debut novel of Sonny Brewer, published by Ballantine. The novel, inspired by the life of Henry Stuart, who moved from Idaho to Alabama in the 1920s after being told incorrectly that he had a year to live, has made Stuart's Alabama home a site of pilgrimage for its readers. The book has been optioned for a film and as of 2007 was in pre-production.

== Plot ==
The book begins in Nampa, Idaho, with Henry Stuart having just learned that he has one to two years to live because he has non-contagious tuberculosis. Told he will be more comfortable in a warmer climate, Stuart leaves his two grown sons to relocate to Fairhope, Alabama. When he arrives, he finds that the land he has purchased sight unseen hosts only a barn. He decides to build a house, on property he names "Tolstoy Park" in honor of Leo Tolstoy, who had himself become a wandering ascetic in the months before his death. An amateur poet and an eccentric, Stuart sheds his materialism for a life of contemplation, one which extends much longer than Stuart expected.

== Background ==
When Sonny Brewer, then a real estate agent, saw a small, round concrete hut sitting adjacent to a parking lot in Fairhope, Alabama in the 1980s, he became curious to know who had built it and why. Several old newspaper articles filled him in on the history of Henry Stuart, an Idahoan who was informed by his doctors in the early 1920s that he had only a year to live. Stuart left two grown sons and moved to 10 acres (4.0 ha) of wilderness in Alabama on which he built by himself a hurricane-proof concrete shelter. The shelter, which was built in about two weeks more than a year in 1925 and 1926, was set 16 inches (41 cm) into the ground on which it was constructed, lending to a comfortable, stable temperature of the floor—the 14 feet (4.3 m) diameter of which was a perfect match to the highest point of the roof. In his late 60s, Stuart climbed a ladder to reach his bed, a hammock strung 10 feet (3.0 m) above the ground. Brewer was fascinated by the story of the eccentric Stuart, who lived in his hut for 18 years convinced he was on the brink of death before relocating, finally dying in Oregon in 1946 at the age of 88.

Brewer was on the verge of bankruptcy when he learned Ballentine had purchased his novel about Stuart's life, only 20 pages of which were complete, for $100,000.00. He rented and set about restoring the hut while writing the novel, moving into it to live—like Stuart—barefoot during its revision.

== Aftermath ==
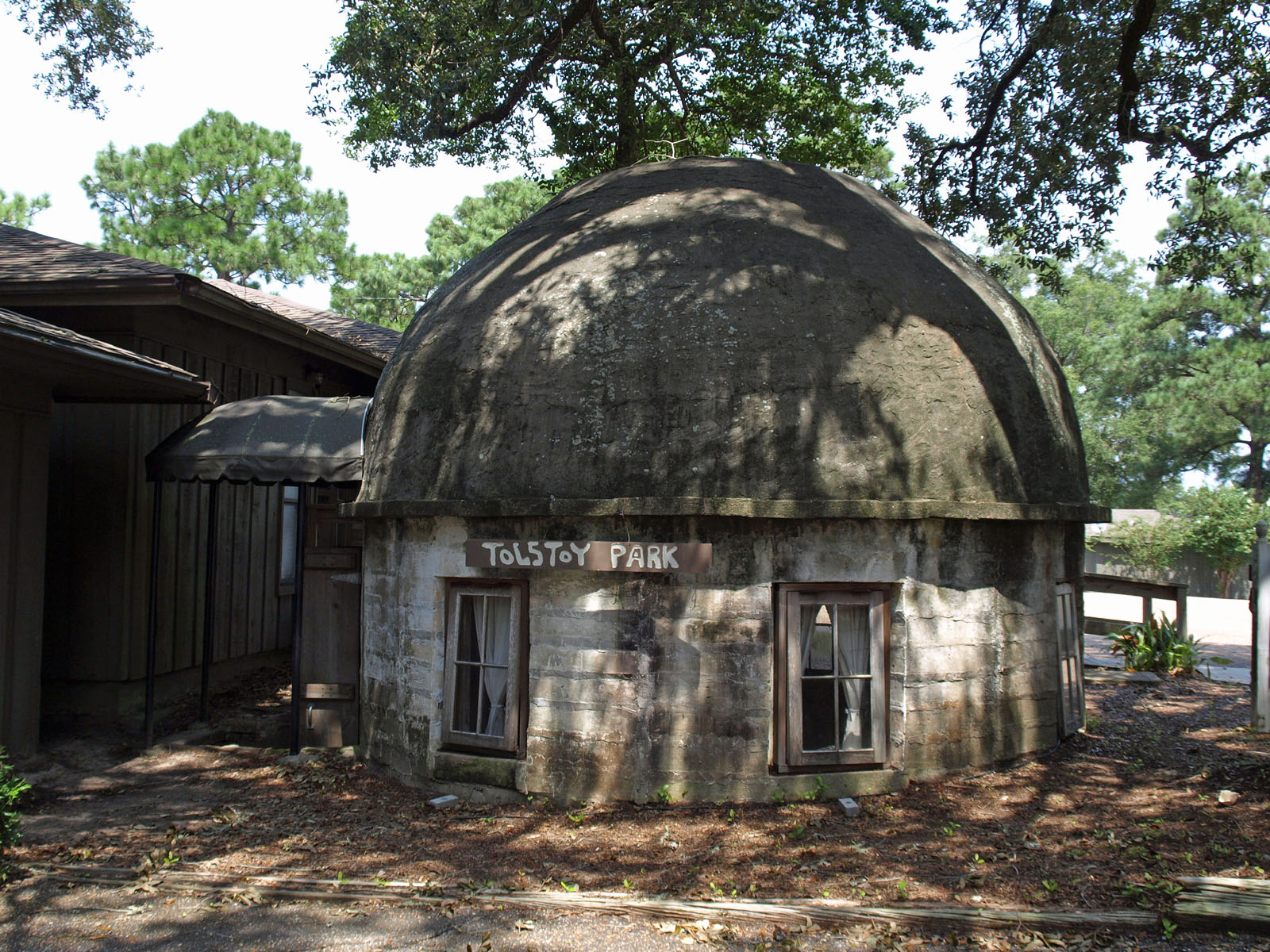
Stuart's hut in Fairhope, Alabama

Even during Stuart's occupancy, the hut was often visited. Stuart, otherwise a hermit, kept a logbook signed by 1,200 guests, including Clarence Darrow. After the book was published, its readers began visiting the hut as well, with 2,000 people in one year signing the logbook left by Brewer, some spending the night inside. In 2006, the hut was listed on the National Register of Historic Places.

In 2007, the novel was optioned for a film and in pre-production. It was to be produced by David Bushell, with a screenplay adapted by Tom Epperson in collaboration with Brewer. The film was never released.
