= Stuart Building =

Stuart Building may refer to:

in the United States (by state)

- Stuart Company Plant and Office Building, Pasadena, California, listed on the National Register of Historic Places in Pasadena, California
- Stuart Building (Louisville, Kentucky), listed on the National Register of Historic Places in Jefferson County, Kentucky
- Stuart Building (Lincoln, Nebraska), listed on the National Register of Historic Places in Lancaster County, Nebraska

== See also ==
- Stewart Building, Toronto, Ontario, Canada
