= Colonel John Stuart House =

Historic house in South Carolina, United States

- U.S. National Register of Historic Places
- U.S. National Historic Landmark
- U.S. National Historic Landmark District – Contributing property
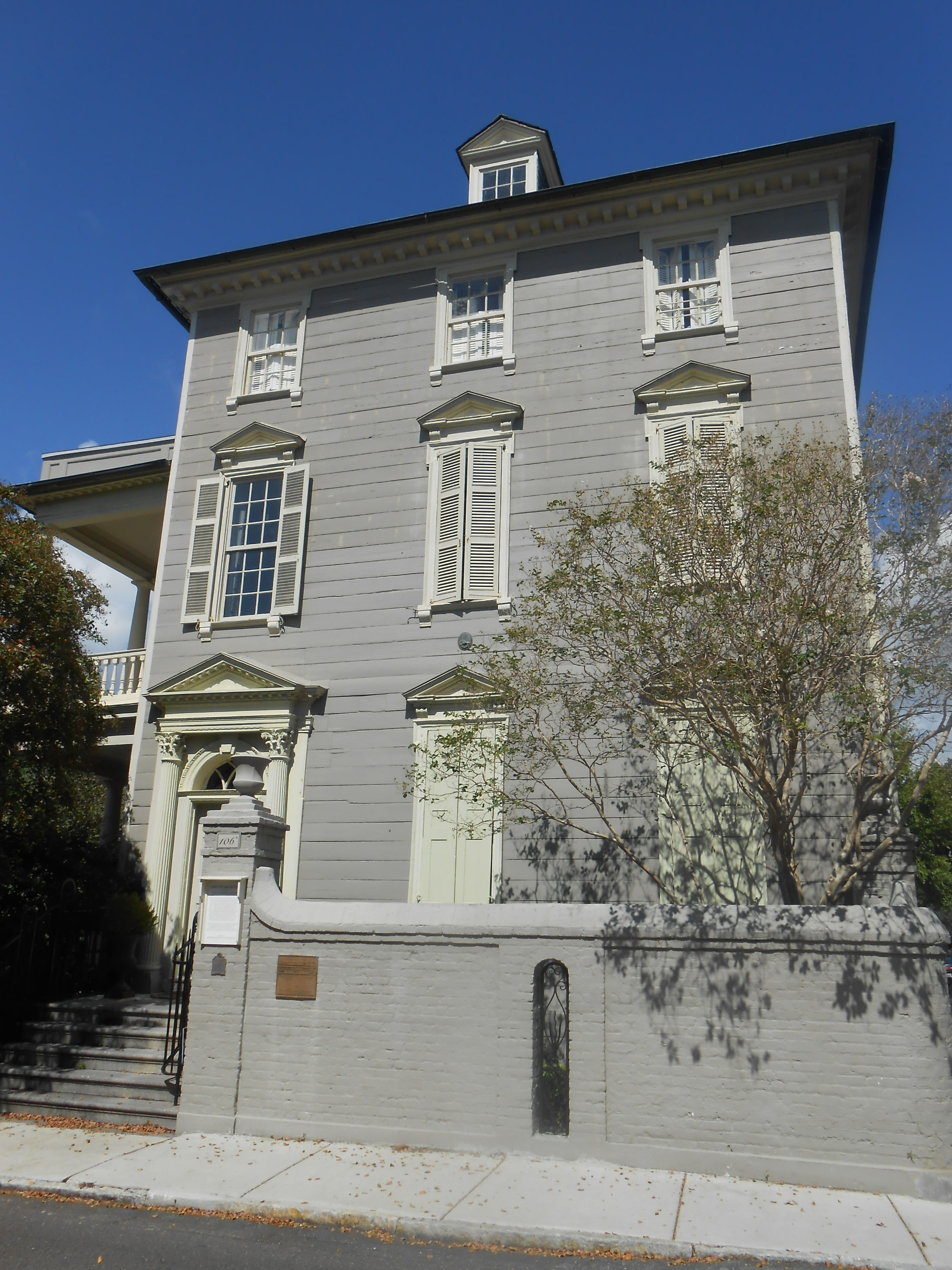
- Colonel John Stuart House

- Location within South Carolina Location within the United States
- Location: 104-106 Tradd St., Charleston, South Carolina
- Coordinates: 32°46′27.4″N 79°56′1.4″W
- Built: 1772
- Architectural style: Georgian
- Part of: Charleston Historic District (ID66000964)
- NRHP reference No.: 70000578

Significant dates
- Added to NRHP: October 22, 1970
- Designated NHL: November 7, 1973
- Designated NHLDCP: October 9, 1960

The Colonel John Stuart House is a historic house at 104-106 Tradd Street in Charleston, South Carolina. Built in 1772, four years before the American Revolution, it is the city's oldest known example of a side-hall plan house. It is nationally significant as the home of Colonel John Stuart, who was the King's Superintendent of Indian Affairs in the South. He improved relations with the Five Civilized Tribes, especially the Cherokee Nation between the Seven Years' War and the American Revolutionary War. It was declared a National Historic Landmark in 1973.

== Description and history ==
The Stuart House is located in historic downtown Charleston, at the northwest corner of Tradd and Orange Streets. It is a three-story wood frame structure, with a hip roof, flushboarded front, and clapboarded side and rear walls. The main facade faces south, with the front entrance in the leftmost of three bays, flanked by fluted Corinthian columns and topped by a rounded transom window entablature and gabled denticulated pediment. Windows on the first two levels are topped by gabled and bracketed pediments, with bracketed lintels. Third floor windows, which butt against the eave, have a simpler hood above. The building interior is arranged with a long hall on the left, with the main stair at its rear. A significant number of it interior finishes are high-quality and careful 20th-century reproductions of the originals, which were moved to a museum in 1930.

The house was listed for sale in January 1864, and an advertisement described "[t]hat handsome and commodious RESIDENCE" at the corner of Tradd and Orange Streets in extensive details: "The house was built in the Colonial times, in the finest style and of the best materials, which are still perfectly sound. It contains nine rooms and a wide entrance hall, extending its entire length. The drawing room, measuring about thirty feet by twenty-one, is very handsomely finished, and communicates with a chamber about twenty-one feet square. The parlor and dining room are also handsomely finished, and about twenty-one feet square. The basement contains a billiard room, store room and ample apartments for wood and coal. The attic is plastered, and divided into one room and four large wine closets, well shelved. On the roof, which was covered a few years ago with the best Welch (sic) slates, is a tastefully constructed lookout, commanding a beautiful view of the city and its surroundings. On the west there are fine double piazzas, with Venetian blinds. The entire building was put in complete order a few years ago. Attached to the house is a new brick building, containing a large pantry with every convenience, and a kitchen with a superior cooking range. The outbuildings are new, and of brick, and contain a laundry and five sleeping rooms, all plastered and glazed, and with fireplaces. A carriage house well paved with stone, and a fine stable for three horses (sic) There is also on the premises a large and remarkably well constructed cistern, besides a well. On the two streets are substantial brick walls, and a handsome iron fence. The lot measures about one hundred and ten (110) feet, by about one hundred and fifty (150); all the buildings being on one half of it, and the other half divided into a shrubbery and garden. The house is well supplied with gas."

The house was built in 1772 for John Stuart, a native of Scotland who came to North America in 1746. In 1762 he was appointed Superintendent of Indian Affairs for the southern British colonies, in which role he was involved in maintaining peaceful relations with the Native American tribes of the region, in particular the Five Civilized Tribes. Politically Loyalist as relations deteriorated between the colonies and Great Britain, Stuart was arrested in 1775 for inciting the Natives against the colonists in the early stages of the American Revolutionary War. He escaped imprisonment, and fled to West Florida, where he directed Native activities in opposition to the rebel colonists until his death in 1779.

== See also ==
- List of National Historic Landmarks in South Carolina
- National Register of Historic Places listings in Charleston, South Carolina
