= James Stewart House (Lexington, South Carolina) =

Historic house in South Carolina, United States

- U.S. National Register of Historic Places
- Nearest city: Lexington, South Carolina
- Built: 1850
- MPS: Lexington County MRA
- NRHP reference No.: 83003917
- Added to NRHP: November 22, 1983

James Stewart House, also known as Stewart's Corner, is a historic home formerly located in Lexington, Lexington County, South Carolina. It was built in 1850, and is a 1 1/2-half story, rectangular, frame cottage with a gable roof and two interior chimneys. It features a porch with a high gable supported by square wood posts. To avoid demolition, the house was moved about 1991 from its original location on West Main Street in Lexington to its current site in the vicinity of Red Bank, South Carolina.

It was listed on the National Register of Historic Places in 1983.
