= James Stewart House (Glasgow, Delaware) =

Historic house in Delaware, US

- U.S. National Register of Historic Places
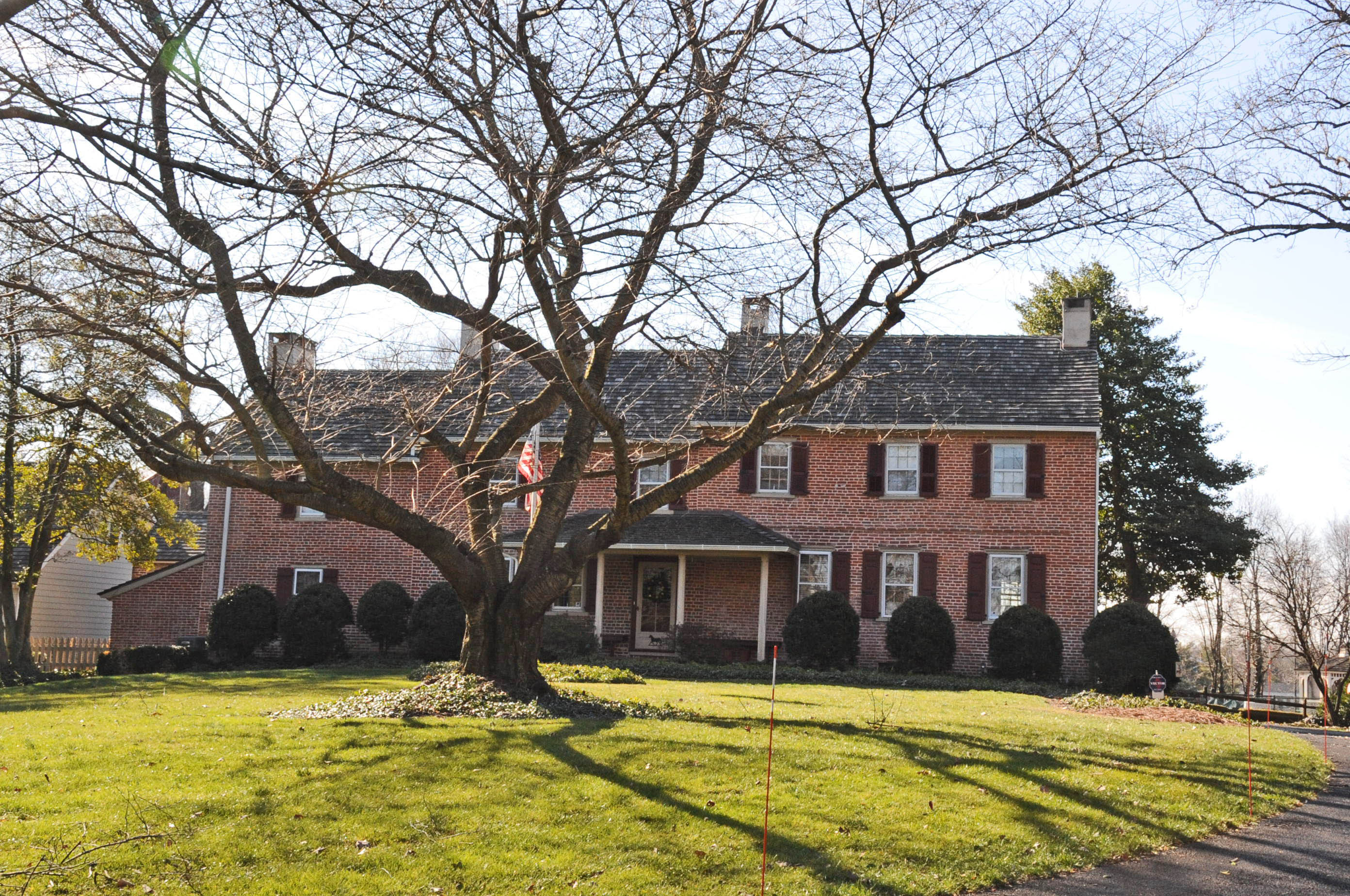
- House in 2016

- Location within Delaware Location within the United States
- Location: 2611 Del Laws Rd., near Glasgow, Delaware
- Coordinates: 39°36′2″N 75°42′56″W
- Area: 6.9 acres (2.8 ha)
- Architect: Stewart, C.B.
- NRHP reference No.: 86001314
- Added to NRHP: June 11, 1986

James Stewart House, also known as Holly Farm, is a historic home and farm located near Glasgow in New Castle County, Delaware, United States. The oldest section dates to the second half of the 18th century, with additions dating to the 18th and 19th centuries. It consists of three distinct two-story, gable-roofed, brick sections joined at the endwalls, plus a one-story, brick lean-to. The oldest section is the first floor of the central section. Also on the property are contributing outbuildings including a brick smokehouse, shop, a corn crib/granary, two sheds, a privy, a bank barn, a milkhouse, and a machine shed.

It was listed on the National Register of Historic Places in 1982.
