= Pine Valley (Provo River) =

Valley in Utah, United States

Coordinates: 40°33′32″N 111°08′14″W

Pine Valley (Provo River), is a valley along the North Fork of the Provo River in Summit and Wasatch counties in north or north-central Utah, United States. The former Stewart Ranch, which includes five buildings listed on the National Register of Historic Places, runs along it.
