= James Stewart Jr. House =

Historic house in Delaware, US

- U.S. National Register of Historic Places
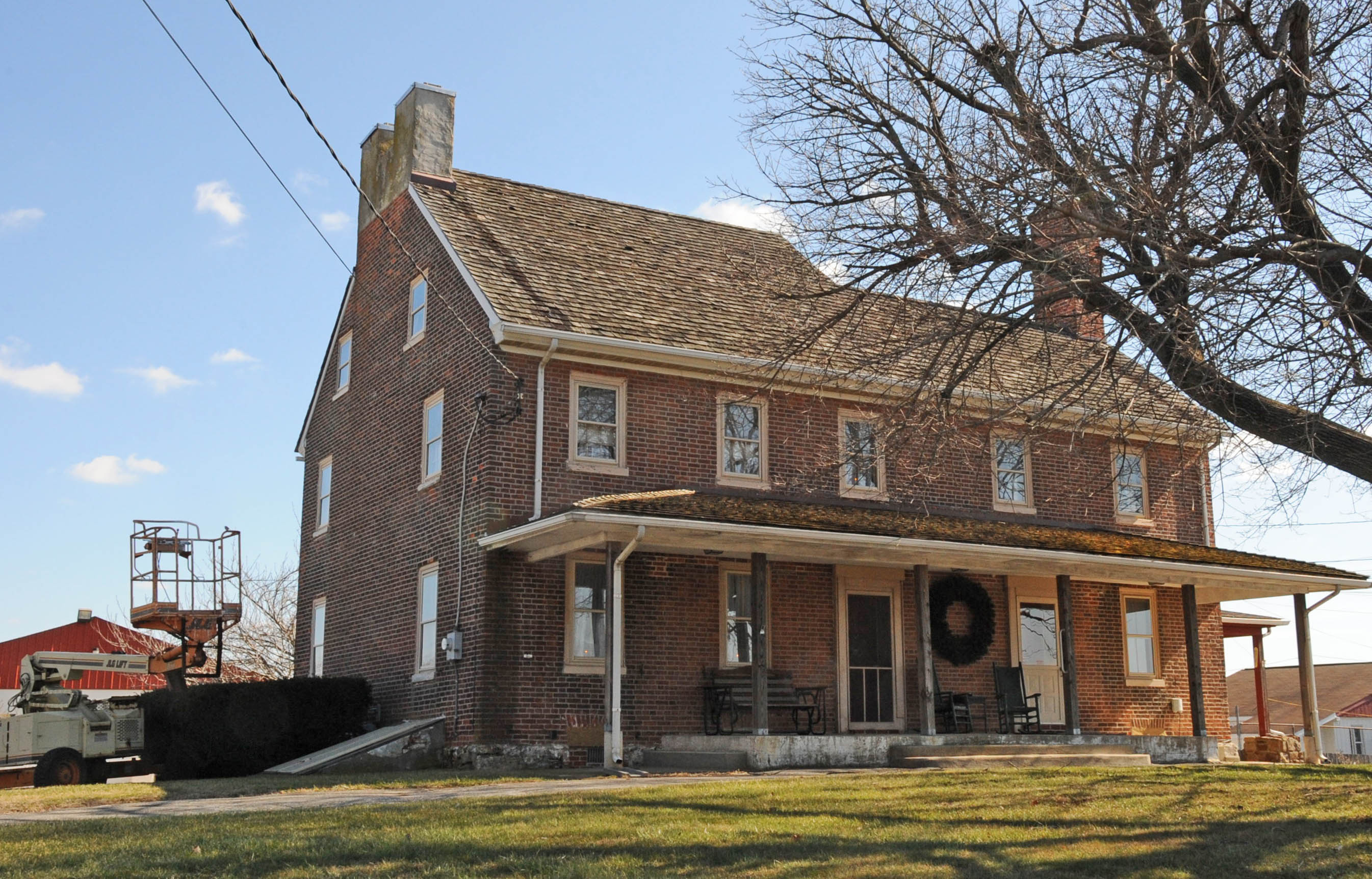
- House in 2016

- Location within Delaware Location within the United States
- Location: 563 Walther Rd., Christiana, Delaware
- Coordinates: 39.64063°N 75.68333°W
- Area: 0.8 acres (0.32 ha)
- MPS: White Clay Creek Hundred MRA
- NRHP reference No.: 83001340
- Added to NRHP: August 19, 1983

James Stewart Jr. House is a historic home located at Christiana, New Castle County, Delaware. It was built in the late-18th century, and is a two-story, five-bay, brick dwelling. It consists of a three-bay, double pile section and a two-bay single pile section. The front facade features a three-bay, one story, hip-roofed facade porch with turned posts and added in the 20th century.

It was listed on the National Register of Historic Places in 1983.
