= Operation Ivory Soap =

American WWII Pacific theater support effort

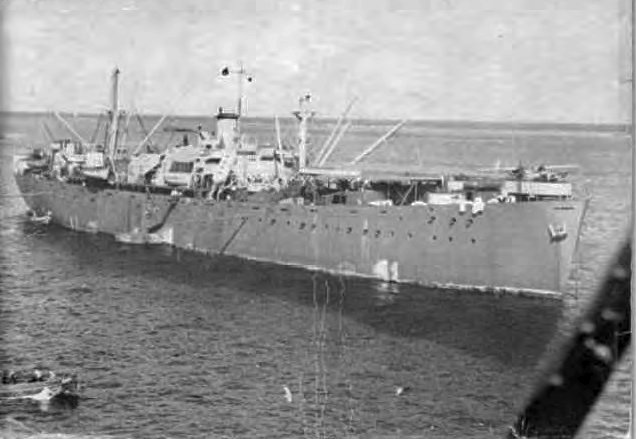
The Liberty ship Rebecca Lukens was converted into a floating machine shop, repair, and maintenance depot and rechristened as the Maj Gen Herbert A Dargue

Operation Ivory Soap was a classified United States military project to provide forward theatre support for aircraft repair and maintenance during World War II in the Pacific Theatre of Operations. Six Liberty ships were converted into floating shops to repair aircraft. They were designated Aircraft Repair Units (Floating). The Liberty ships were retrofitted to repair B-29 bombers. Eighteen smaller 187 feet (57 m) long auxiliary vessels were designated as Aircraft Maintenance Units. The smaller vessels were intended to repair fighter aircraft like the P-51 Mustang, Lockheed P-38, Sikorsky R-4 helicopters, and amphibious vehicles.

The island-hopping strategy employed in campaigns like Operation Cartwheel necessitated more flexibility to support aircraft operations at rapidly shifting, far-flung island airfields. Once an island was taken it was used as a forward airfield for aircraft returning from long range missions where they were repaired, rearmed, and made ready for the next vital mission. The Army came up with an idea in 1944 for forward-based, mobile air depots to repair and maintain American bombers and fighters. The idea was then advanced to Washington, where it was reviewed and approved by the commander of the Army Air Corps, Gen. Henry H. "Hap" Arnold. It was then approved by the Joint Chiefs of Staff.

Brookley Army Air Field near Mobile, Alabama had become the major Army Air Forces supply base for the Air Materiel Command in the southeastern United States and the Caribbean. The military decided to take advantage of Brookley's large, skilled workforce for the top-secret project. It selected Colonel Matthew Thompson, a former member of the British Royal Navy, to lead the training effort. He took over the Grand Hotel in Point Clear, Alabama and in less than five months trained about 5000 Army soldiers in the skills necessary to repair aircraft and to operate aboard a ship. Meanwhile, the ships were fitted with all of the shops and materials necessary to support and repair aircraft.

In October 1944 the First Aircraft Repair Unit deployed and by the following February, all six vessels traveled through the Panama Canal to the Pacific. The ships were manned by members of the Army, Navy and Merchant Marines. They operated near Eniwetok in the Marshall Islands, Saipan and Tinian in the Northern Mariana Islands, Iwo Jima, Luzon, Guam, and Okinawa. The ship's early model Sikorsky R-4 helicopters were used to transport mechanics, parts, and later to ferry wounded soldiers to field hospitals. The helicopters were instrumental in saving dozens of lives. The project was declassified in 1953.

== Origins ==
The idea of floating aircraft repair units was conceived during U.S. military operations in the Mediterranean Sea during World War II. The Army Air Force learned when moving forces from Tunisia in North Africa to Sicily and Italy that relocating a land-based repair depot with its large maintenance facilities could take two to six months. Air Technical Service Command, responsible for maintaining aircraft, was given responsibility for finding a solution.

During World War II, Brookley Army Air Field had become the major Army Air Forces supply base for the Air Technical Service Command in the southeastern United States and the Caribbean. Brookley became Mobile's largest employer, with about 17,000 skilled civilians capable of performing delicate work with fragile instruments and machinery.

The Air Technical Service Command decided in 1944 to take advantage of Brookley's large, skilled workforce for its top-secret "Ivory Soap" project to hasten victory in the Pacific. The project required 24 large vessels to be re-modeled into Aircraft Repair and Maintenance Units that could support repair and maintenance of B-29 bombers, P-51 Mustang, Sikorsky R-4 helicopters, and amphibious vehicles. The operation remained classified until 1953. It is not even mentioned in the official history book The Army Air Forces In World War II.

== Conversions ==
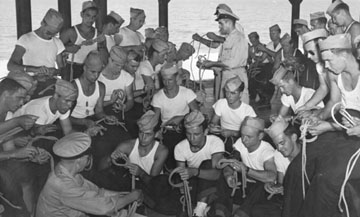
Soldiers learn to handle lines aboard Liberty ships

The Army Air Force delivered 24 vessels to Mobile, Alabama, in spring 1944 to start conversion. Six Liberty ships were converted into floating shops to repair aircraft. They were designated Aircraft Repair Units (Floating) and were equipped to repair planes as big as the B-29 Superfortress. Eighteen smaller ships were outfitted as Aircraft Maintenance Units for the repair of fighter aircraft.

Eventually, six 440 feet (130 m)-long Liberty ships were modified into Aircraft Repair Units (Floating) carrying about 344 men. Eighteen smaller 187 feet (57 m) long coastal freighters were designated as Aircraft Maintenance Units and manned by 48 troops. Everything from the smallest aircraft parts to complete fighter wings were carried on these ships. The repair and maintenance facilities were manned 24 hours a day and the Liberty ships were equipped with a 40 by 72 feet (12 m × 22 m) steel deck to support helicopter operations, including quick ship-to-shore repair transport.

The conversion added multiple shops and equipment to the Liberty Ships: machine tools, welding, cranes, sheet metal, radiator, tank, wood, patterns, blue print, electrical, fabric and dope, paint, air-conditioned instrument and camera shops, radio, battery, propeller, tires and fuel cells, armament and turrets, plating, radar, carburetor, and turbosupercharger. A shop for generating oxygen used aboard the bombers was also built. Each ship had a hospital, orderly room, mess facilities, sleeping quarters, laundry, post office, Military prison#United States, and post exchange. The only work they did not perform was engine overhaul due to limited space. Two LCVPs and two DUKWs were added for ship-to-shore transportation along with three or four Sikorsky R-4 helicopters. The helicopters were used to locate downed planes, rescue flight crews and passengers, ferry technicians and mechanics to islands, and to transport parts.

The ships carried a large inventory of steel, lumber, aluminum, and other materials to manufacture needed parts. They carried anti-aircraft guns. Each Liberty had a 3-inch 50 at the bow and a 5-inch 38 aft, plus two 40mm anti-aircraft and twelve 20mm anti-aircraft gun mounts. Proportionately less firepower went aboard the auxiliaries. The guns were manned by 27 members of the Naval Armed Guard while the ships' operations were performed by merchant marine crews.

The ship conversion took place near Brookley Army Air Field.

=== Liberty ships ===
After their arrival in the Pacific in April 1945, the six converted Liberty ships were renamed with new "General" names. The first and second ships were specially equipped and trained to support B-29s in the Marianas, including repair of their radar and complex central fire control systems. They became known as "The Generals."

- 1st ARU(F) SS Daniel E. Garrett renamed Major General Robert Olds.
- 2nd ARU(F) SS Rebecca Lukens renamed Major General Herbert A. Dargue.
- 3rd ARU(F) SS Thomas LeValley renamed Major General Walter R. Weaver.
- 4th ARU(F) SS Richard O'Brien renamed General Asa N. Duncan.
- 5th ARU(F) SS Robert W. Bingham renamed Brigadier General Clinton W. Russell.
- 6th ARU(F) SS Nathaniel Scudder renamed Brigadier General Alfred J. Lyon. Commanded by Col. E. R. French and later by Col. Lelard D. Crawford.

=== Auxiliary Aircraft Repair Ships ===
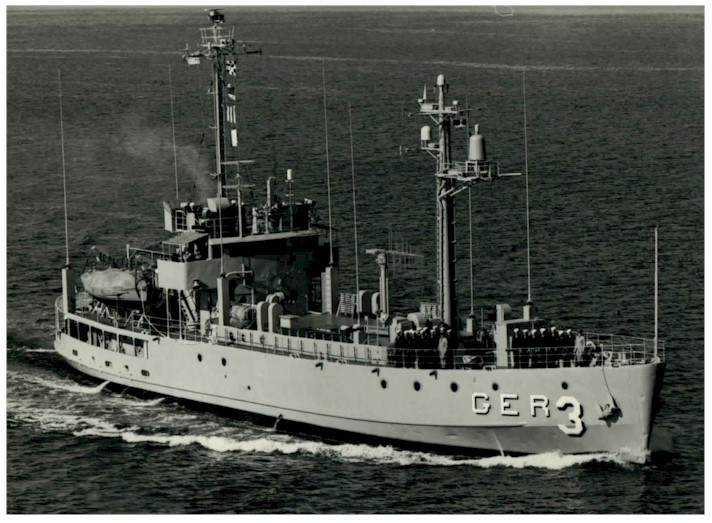
USS Palm Beach AGER-3 underway in Puget Sound on 13 September 1967, formerly the Col. Armand Peterson.

The auxiliary ships were designated as Aircraft Repair variant, Design 427, "Vessel, Supply, Aircraft Repair, Diesel, Steel, 180-foot 573 ton" vessels. They were purpose built by Higgins Industries in New Orleans, Louisiana, for use by the United States Army. The ships were designed with a covered well deck to provide shop space to repair aircraft by an embarked Aircraft Maintenance Unit (Floating). (Note: See the description of the 16th Aircraft Maintenance Unit (Floating) deployment in the 801st Special Operations Aircraft Maintenance Squadron (AFSOC) factsheet at Air Force Historical Research Agency for sister ship FS-215.) The 18 auxiliaries were completed in December 1944 and named in honor of an Army Colonel, gaining the nickname as a group of "The Colonels."

- FS-204 Col. Clifford P. Bradley
- FS-205 Col. Richard E. Cobb
- FS-206 Col. John D. Corkille (#1) and (#2)
- FS-207 Col. Demas T. Craw
- FS-208 Col. Everett S. Davis
- FS-209 Col. Sam L. Ellis
- FS-210 Col. Oliver S. Ferson
- FS-211 Col. Percival E. Gabel
- FS-212 Col. Donald M. Keiser
- FS-213 Col. Douglas M. Kilpatrick
- FS-214 Col. Raymond T. Lester
- FS-215 Col. Donald R. Lyon
- FS-216 Col. William J. McKiernan
- FS-217 Col. Armand Peterson (went to the Navy as USS Palm Beach (AGER-3))
- FS-218 Col. Charles T. Phillips
- FS-219 Col. Edgar R. Todd
- FS-220 Col. Harold B. Wright
- FS-221 Col. Francis T. Ziegler

== Training ==
Colonel Matthew Thompson of the Army Air Force, formerly a member of the British Royal Navy, was called back from Anzio in Italy. He was given the mission to turn airmen into seamen and was given less than two weeks to organize the training program. Thompson learned of the Grand Hotel in Point Clear, Alabama. He contacted Ed Roberts, head of the Waterman Steamship Co., owner of the Grand Hotel. Roberts donated the use of his hotel. "Colonel, I'm too old to fight," Roberts told Thompson, "and this is my donation to the war effort." Thompson insisted that using the hotel free of charge didn't feel right. Thompson said Roberts told him, " 'Give me a dollar.' I gave him a dollar, and that was that."

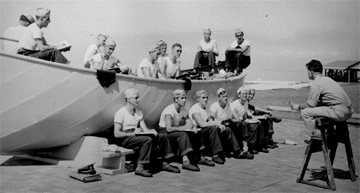
Merchant Marine Officer teaching lifeboat skills to the Army crewmembers

Using the Grand Hotel, officers and men moved in and began living in "Navy style." All personnel referred to the floors as decks, kept time by a ship's bell and indulged in the use of tobacco only when the "smoking lamp" was lit. The hotel was used to house soldiers and served as a maritime training facility. It was the focal point for training the Army Air Force officers, mechanics, and machinists in basic seamanship, marine and aquatic training, including how to abandon ship if needed. Courses included swimming, special calisthenics, marching, drill, navigation, ship identification, signaling, cargo handling, ship orientation, sail making, knot-tying, amphibious operations, and more. Two men from each ship were also trained to be underwater divers.

"We called this the Ivory Soap Project," Thompson later told a newspaper. "Now how did this become that code name? Someone went to the restroom, and when he came back, said, 'I've got a name for the mission: Ivory Soap.'" Ivory soap, like the experimental Aircraft Repair Units, floats. Operation Ivory Soap training began on July 10, 1944. In less than five months, Thompson led the conversion effort and trained 5,000 highly trained Army Air Force seamen to operate the ships once on the water. By October, the first vessel departed Mobile.

== Operations ==
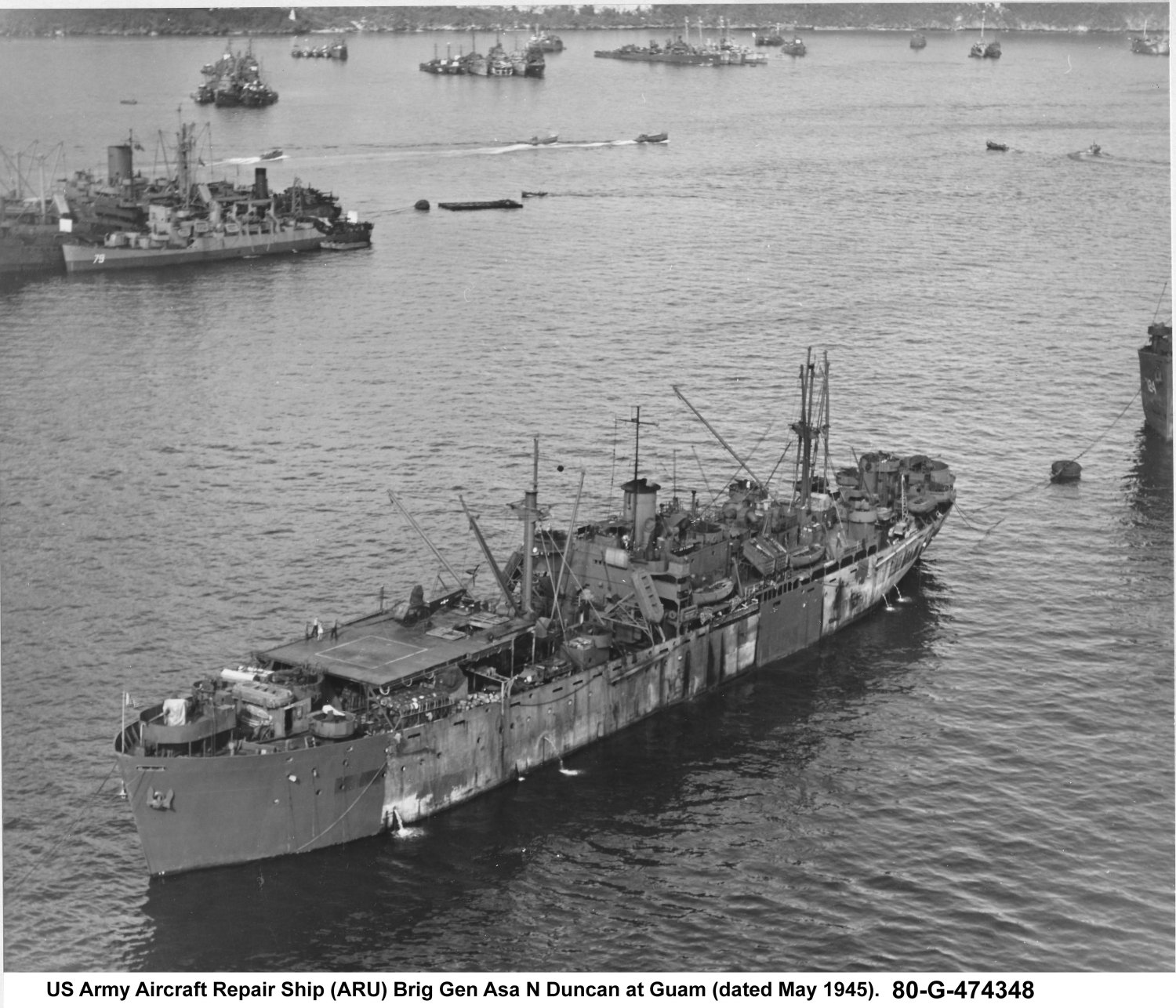
Brig. Gen. Asa N. Duncan at anchor in Guam, May 1945

On October 1, 1944, SS Maj. Gen. Herbert A. Dargue sailed for New Orleans, then to Guantanamo Bay, Cuba, to join a convoy through the Panama Canal. Once in the Pacific, she sailed alone at 10 knots (19 km/h; 12 mph) toward Eniwetok in the Marshall Islands. From there it was ordered to Saipan. In November it anchored the hook in Tanapag Harbor near Saipan. Colonel Thompson joined the men in the Pacific Campaign. The ships participated in landings in the Philippines, Guam, Tinian, Saipan, Iwo Jima, and Okinawa. The Brig. Gen. Alfred J. Lyon departed for the Pacific on February 2, 1945. By the end of February, all six vessels were in the Pacific.

The soldiers wore Navy dungarees and white sailor hats while on board ship, and an Army uniform while on land. They were nicknamed "saildiers" (sail-jers) by other soldiers and sailors. At the beginning of June 1945, the Third, Fifth, and Sixth Aircraft Repair Units were operating in the Philippines, supporting the Fifth Army Air Force, while the remaining three supported the 20th Air Force in the Marianas. Fighter aircraft and B-29s taking off from these bases flew continuous missions over Japan. The soldiers saved many lives and serviced hundreds of aircraft. The Brigadier General Clinton W. Russell commanded by Major R. E. Culberson was stationed at Biak, Tacloban, and Naha. As needed, the mechanics and craftsmen would take the DUKW or the helicopter to shore to inspect damaged aircraft. Small assemblies would be flown back to the ship for repair. Larger parts could be transported on the DUKW. Mechanics could also set up on shore and complete repairs there. Between November 1944 and 1 September 1945, Major General Herbert A. Dargue alone supplied B-29s and P-51s with over 38,000 parts and units, ranging from spark plugs to the central fire controls for the B-29.

After the war ended, the USS Brig. Gen. Alfred J. Lyon was the first supply vessel docked in Tokyo Bay at Yokohama, Japan. It was later used as a repair ship to maintain specialized equipment used during Operation Crossroads, the nuclear weapon tests conducted by the United States at Bikini Atoll in mid-1946.

=== Medical evacuations ===
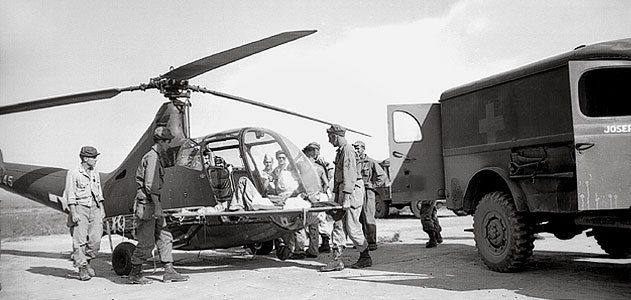
A Sikorsky R-6A transport ferries a wounded soldier from the battlefield during June 1945 in Luzon, Philippines

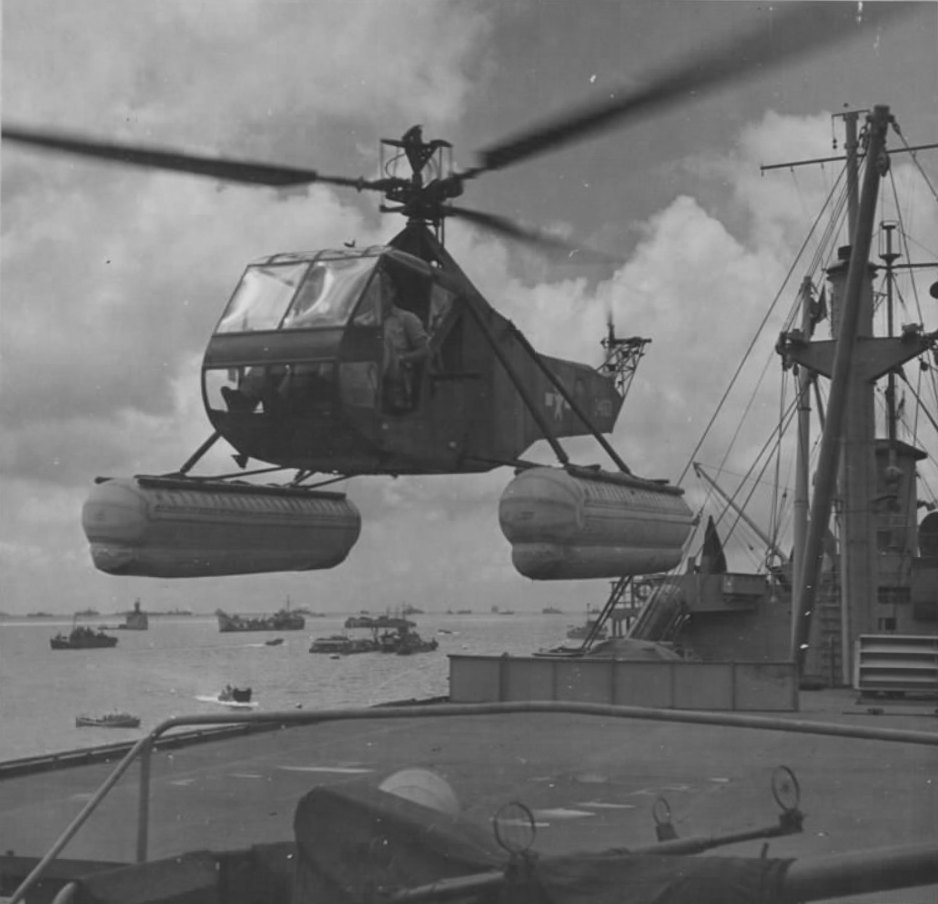
R-4B Sikorsky helicopter landing on the SS Daniel E. Garrett

Helicopter pilot 2LT Louis Carle was assigned to the Brigadier General Clinton W. Russell, the Fifth Aircraft Repair Unit. On June 15, 1945, the Fifth Air Force received a request from the 38th Infantry Division to evacuate two soldiers with head injuries from a spot 35 miles (56 km) east of Manila. Carle flew one of his ship's Sikorsky R-4 helicopters and landed near the front lines, much to the amazement of the soldiers, who had never seen a helicopter.

Under the best of conditions, the R-4 could carry, in addition to the pilot and fuel, only 195 pounds (88 kg), which meant only instruments and small components such as propeller hubs. But the timely delivery of even small payloads was highly valued.

The helicopter was not configured to handle stretchers. Carle removed a seat, placed the wounded soldier on the aircraft floor, and flew him to the 311th General Field Hospital near Manila. Once word got out of the helicopter's availability, they were called on again and again. During one day, Carle flew seven hours and evacuated six wounded soldiers.

From June 15 to July 29, 1945, Carle and five other pilots evacuated 75 to 80 wounded soldiers, one or two at a time, from the highlands northeast of Manila. They were the second group of helicopter pilots after Lieutenant Carter Harman to evacuate wounded via helicopter during World War II. Unlike Harman, they were targeted by Japanese soldiers who tried to shoot them down with machine guns. Their six-week effort constitutes the largest combat helicopter operation before the Korean War.

On June 25, the Brigadier General Alfred J. Lyon arrived in Manila Bay. Its pilots also flew rescue operations using their R-4B and R-6A helicopters. In four days, pilots 1LT James Brown, 2LT John Noll, and Flight Officer Edward Ciccolella transported around 40 wounded.

== Legacy ==
The Merchant Marines who worked with the soldiers praised them as "equal to any seagoing combatants they had ever served with." During the Grand Hotel's 150th anniversary, room 1108, used as an office by Thompson, was officially renamed the Thompson Suite. After Thompson retired in Pensacola, Florida, he returned to the hotel and would only stay in that room. Every day at 3:45 p.m., the Grand Hotel honors its wartime history with a procession across the grounds, concluding with a brief history lesson and cannon firing on the edge of Mobile Bay. As of 2021, the Grand Hotel still operates. The Air Force Museum at Dayton, Ohio established an exhibit commemorating the ships and men of Ivory Soap. A Memorial Plaque was dedicated there by the Floating Aircraft Repair and Maintenance Association (FARAMA) on October 3, 1997.

Air Depot Liberty Ships and Maintenance Unit Auxiliary Vessels supported air operations in the Western Pacific. Army, Navy and Merchant Marines combined to provide aircraft repair shops, specialty services, mobile maintenance, defensive gunnery, salvage and rescue operations. Their helicopters operating from shipboard helipads and amphibious vehicles served island locations. Dedicated by Veterans 3 Oct 97 FARAMA reunion.

Sgt. John Francis Sullivan served with the 107th Quartermaster Company, 126th Infantry, 32nd Infantry Division, in New Guinea and Australia from October 1942 through December 1944. By November 1962 Col. Sullivan was a widely respected Army aviator. Frank S. Besson, commanding general of AMC, assigned him as project officer for Operation Flat Top. This program involved conversion of a former World War II seaplane tender, the USS Albemarle (AV 5), into a floating helicopter repair shop for service off the coast of Vietnam.

== See also ==
- Mobile Naval Air Base - equivalent British scheme
