= SS Thomas LeValley =

World War II Liberty ship of the United States

History

United States
- Name: Thomas LeValley
- Namesake: Thomas LeValley
- Owner: War Shipping Administration (WSA)
- Ordered: as type (EC2-S-C1) hull, MC hull 2295
- Builder: J.A. Jones Construction, Panama City, Florida
- Cost: $1,039,830
- Yard number: 36
- Way number: 5
- Laid down: 11 February 1944
- Launched: 28 March 1944
- Sponsored by: Mrs. L.R. Hubbard
- Completed: 5 May 1944
- Fate: Transferred to the Army Transport Service (ATS), 5 May 1944

United States
- Name: Thomas LeValley; Major General Walter R. Weaver
- Namesake: Walter R. Weaver
- Owner: WSA
- Operator: ATS
- Acquired: 5 May 1944
- Renamed: April 1945
- Refit: Converted to an Aircraft Repair Unit (Floating) (ARU(F))
- Identification: ARU(F)-3
- Fate: Laid up in National Defense Reserve Fleet, James River Group, Lee Hall, Virginia, 5 March 1946; Sold for scrapping, 27 February 1970

General characteristics
- Class & type: Liberty ship; type EC2-S-C1, standard
- Tonnage: 10,865 LT DWT; 7,176 GRT
- Displacement: 3,380 long tons (3,434 t) (light); 14,245 long tons (14,474 t) (max)
- Length: 441 feet 6 inches (135 m) oa; 416 feet (127 m) pp; 427 feet (130 m) lwl
- Beam: 57 feet (17 m)
- Draft: 27 ft 9.25 in (8.4646 m)
- Installed power: 2 × Oil fired 450 °F (232 °C) boilers, operating at 220 psi (1,500 kPa); 2,500 hp (1,900 kW)
- Propulsion: 1 × triple-expansion steam engine, (manufactured by Iron Fireman Manufacturing Co., Portland, Oregon); 1 × screw propeller
- Speed: 11.5 knots (21.3 km/h; 13.2 mph)
- Capacity: 562,608 cubic feet (15,931 m^{3}) (grain); 499,573 cubic feet (14,146 m^{3}) (bale)
- Complement: 38–62 USMM; 21–40 USNAG
- Armament: Varied by ship; Bow-mounted 3-inch (76 mm)/50-caliber gun; Stern-mounted 4-inch (102 mm)/50-caliber gun; 2–8 × single 20-millimeter (0.79 in) Oerlikon anti-aircraft (AA) cannons and/or, 2–8 × 37-millimeter (1.46 in) M1 AA guns

General characteristics ARU(F)
- Type: Aircraft Repair Unit (Floating)
- Boats & landing craft carried: 2 × motor launches; 2 × LCVPs; 2 × DUKWs
- Complement: 26 USAAF officers; 340 USAAF enlisted men
- Aircraft carried: 2 × Sikorsky R-4s
- Aviation facilities: 1 × Landing platform

SS Thomas LeValley was a Liberty ship built in the United States during World War II. She was named after Thomas LeValley. She was transferred to the Army Transport Service (ATS) and later renamed Major General Walter R. Weaver after Major General Walter R. Weaver, a graduate of Virginia Military Institute that went on to serve in several prominent commands during World War I and World War II, in the United States Army Air Forces.

== Construction ==
Thomas LeValley was laid down on 11 February 1944, under a Maritime Commission (MARCOM) contract, MC hull 2995, by J.A. Jones Construction, Panama City, Florida; sponsored by Mrs. L.R. Hubbard, mother-in-law of Raymond A. Jones, she was launched on 28 March 1944.

== History ==
She was allocated to the Army Transport Service, on 5 May 1944. She was converted at Point Clear, Alabama, into an Aircraft Repair Unit (Floating) (ARU(F)) and designated USAAFS Thomas LeValley (ARU(F)-3). The conversion added the following shops on the Liberty ship; machine, sheet metal, radiator, tank, wood, pattern, blue print, electrical, fabric and dope, paint, air-conditioned instrument and camera, radio, battery, propeller, tires and fuel cells, armament and turrets, plating, oxygen plant, radar, carburetor, and turbo-super-charger. Two LCVPs and two DUKWs were added for ship to shore transportation along with three or four Sikorsky R-4s helicopters.

The crew was given two weeks training in seamanship at the Grand Hotel in Point Clear, Alabama, on Mobile Bay. Classes included; swimming, elementary seamanship, life saving equipment, and advanced seamanship.

On 15 November 1944, Thomas LeValley sailed from Brookley Field for the Pacific. She first visited Guantanamo Bay, Cuba, before setting sail for the Panama Canal and arriving in Finschhafen, 1 January 1945.

On 21 February 1945, Thomas LeValley anchored in Lingayen Bay, and began her mission of transferring and repairing equipment from onshore. All six ARU(F)s had their names changed at the end of April 1945, from their original Liberty ship names to their new "General" names. Thomas LeValley was renamed Major General Walter R. Weaver. The United States Navy Armed Guard was withdrawn on 4 May 1945, and returned to the US for reassignment.

On 1 August 1945, Major General Walter R. Weaver transferred to Subic Bay, where she stayed until returning to the US.

On 5 March 1946, she was laid up in the National Defense Reserve Fleet, in the James River Group, in Lee Hall, Virginia. On 27 February 1970, she was sold, along with three other ships, for $470,500 to S.P.A. Cantieri Navali, Genova, Italy, for scrapping. She was removed from the fleet on 1 May 1970.

== Bibliography ==
- "Jones Construction, Panama City FL". www.ShipbuildingHistory.com. 13 October 2010.
- "Liberty Ships – World War II".
- Maritime Administration. "Thomas LeValley". Ship History Database Vessel Status Card. U.S. Department of Transportation, Maritime Administration. Archived from the original on 12 December 2019.
- Davies, James (May 2004). "Specifications (As-Built)" (PDF). p. 23.
- "SS Thomas LeValley".
- Crockett, Jeffery R. D. "Jeffery R. D. Crockett". Archived from the original on 8 February 2022.
