= Medical evacuation =

Emergency evacuation for medical reasons

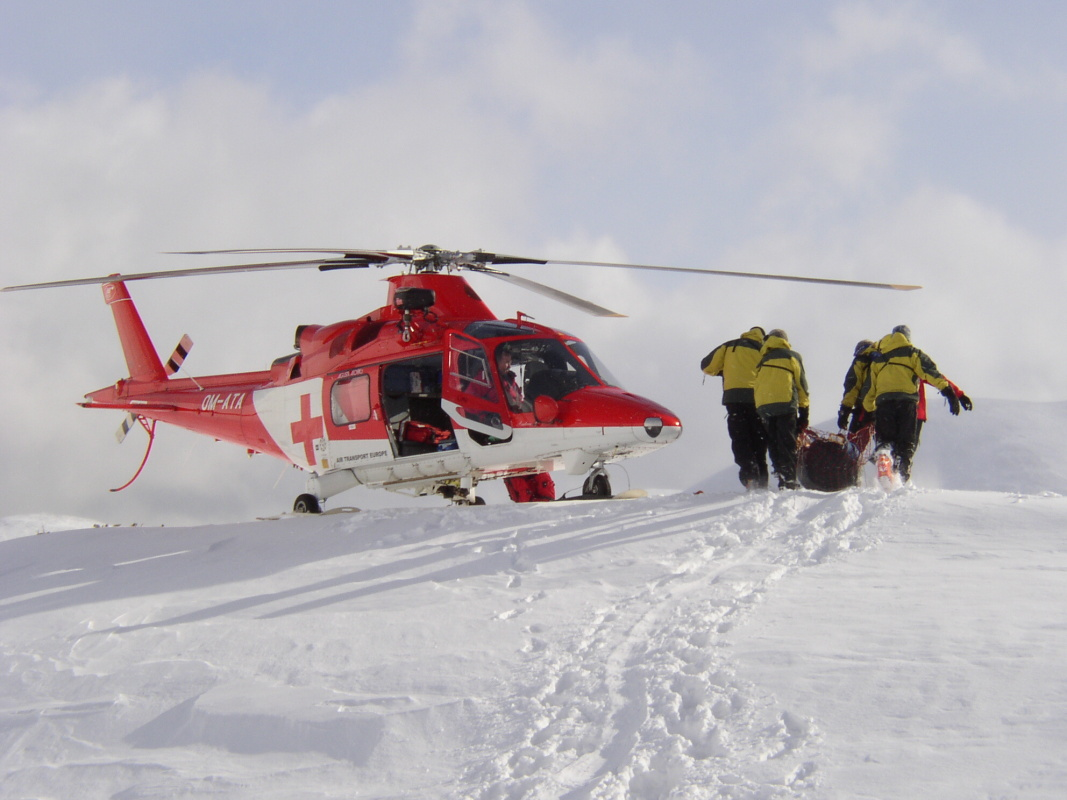
An AW109 helicopter evacuates a patient from the Tatra Mountains in Slovakia

Medical evacuation, often shortened to medevac or medivac, is the timely and efficient movement and en route care provided by medical personnel to patients requiring evacuation or transport using medically equipped air ambulances, helicopters and other means of emergency transport including ground ambulance and maritime transfers.

Examples include civilian EMS vehicles, civilian aeromedical helicopter services, and military air ambulances. This term also covers the transfer of patients from the battlefield to a treatment facility or from one treatment facility to another by medical personnel, such as from a local hospital to another medical facility which has adequate medical equipment.

== History ==
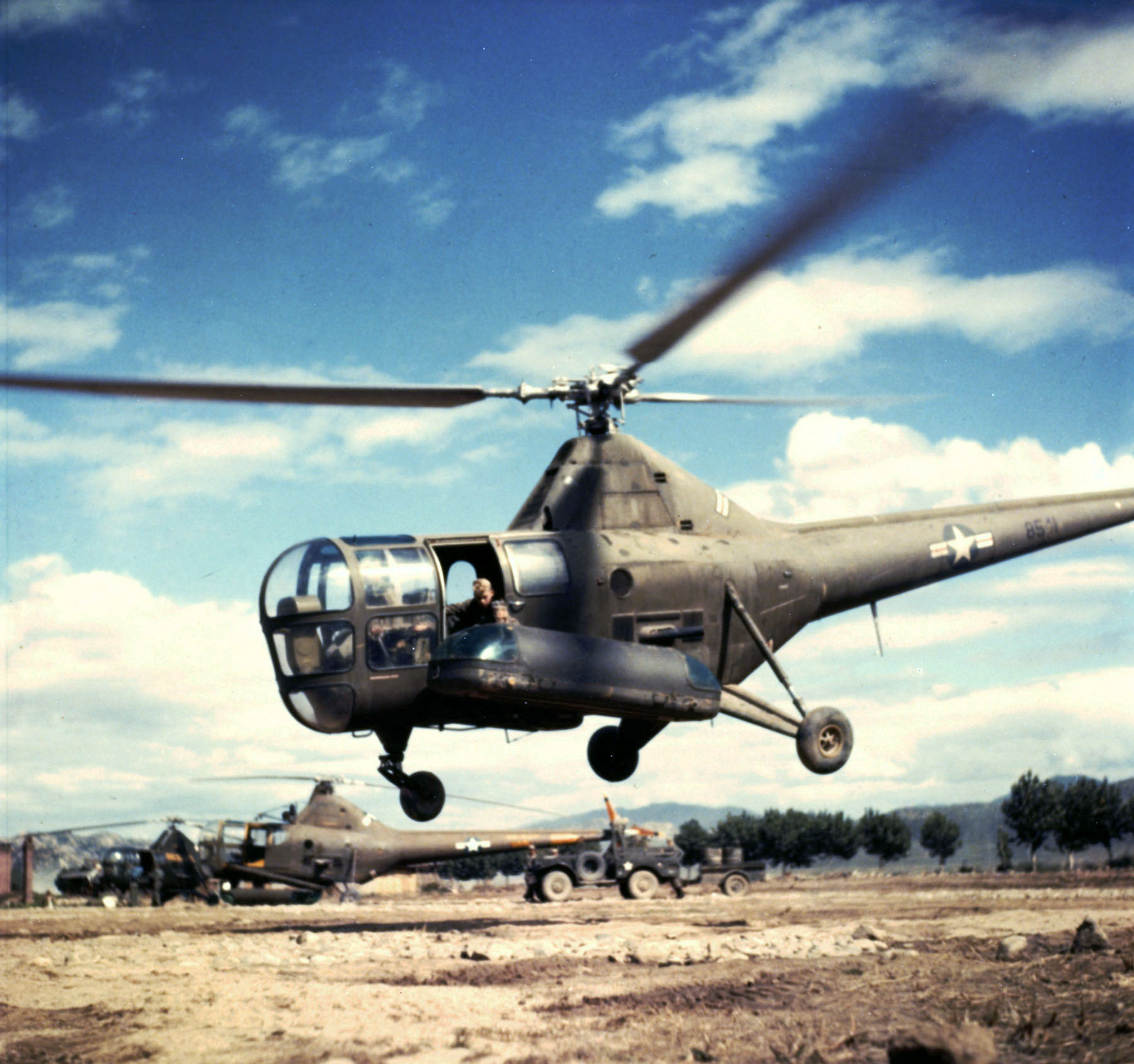
USAF Sikorsky R-5 Helicopter evacuates casualties during the Korean War

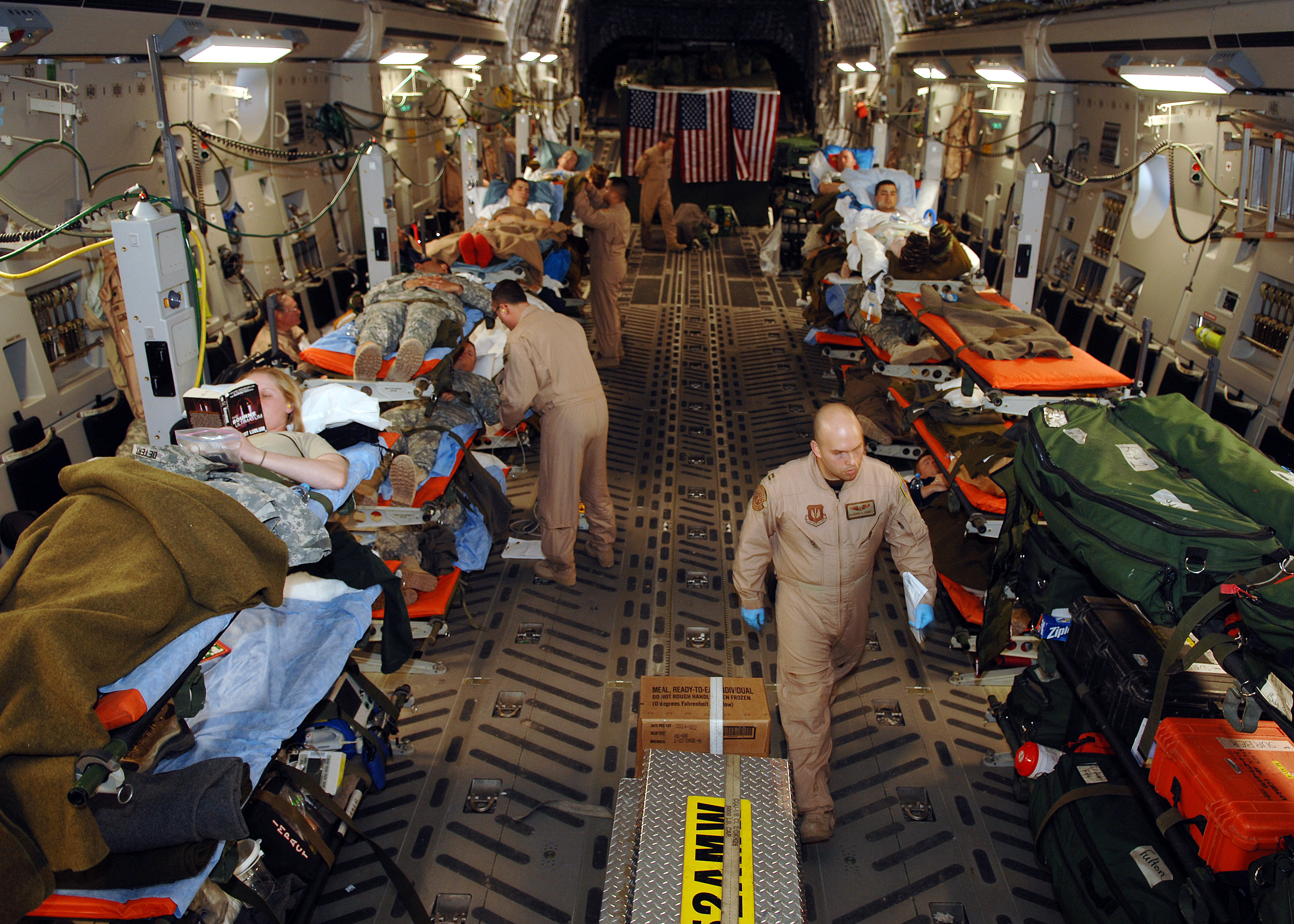
An aeromedical evacuation of injured patients by a C-17 from Balad, Iraq to Ramstein Air Base, Germany, in 2007

The first medical transport by air was recorded in Serbia in the autumn of 1915 during the First World War. One of the ill soldiers in that first medical transport was Milan Rastislav Štefánik, a Slovak pilot-volunteer who was flown to safety by French aviator Louis Paulhan.

The United States Army used this lifesaving technique in Burma toward the end of World War II with Sikorsky R-4B helicopters. The first helicopter rescue was by 2nd Lt Carter Harman, in Japanese-held Burma, who had to make several hops to get his Sikorsky YR-4B to the 1st Air Commando Group's secret airfield in enemy territory and then made four trips from there between April 25 and 26 to recover the American pilot and four injured British soldiers, one at a time. The first medivac under fire happened in Manila in 1945 when five pilots evacuated 75–80 soldiers one or two at a time.

== See also ==
- Aeromedical evacuation
- Air ambulance
- Air medical services
- Casualty evacuation
- "Medevac bill" (Australia, 2019)
- Medivac, Australian television series
- Shock Trauma Air Rescue Society
