= Grand Hotel (Point Clear, Alabama) =

Coordinates: 30.484900°N 87.934465°W

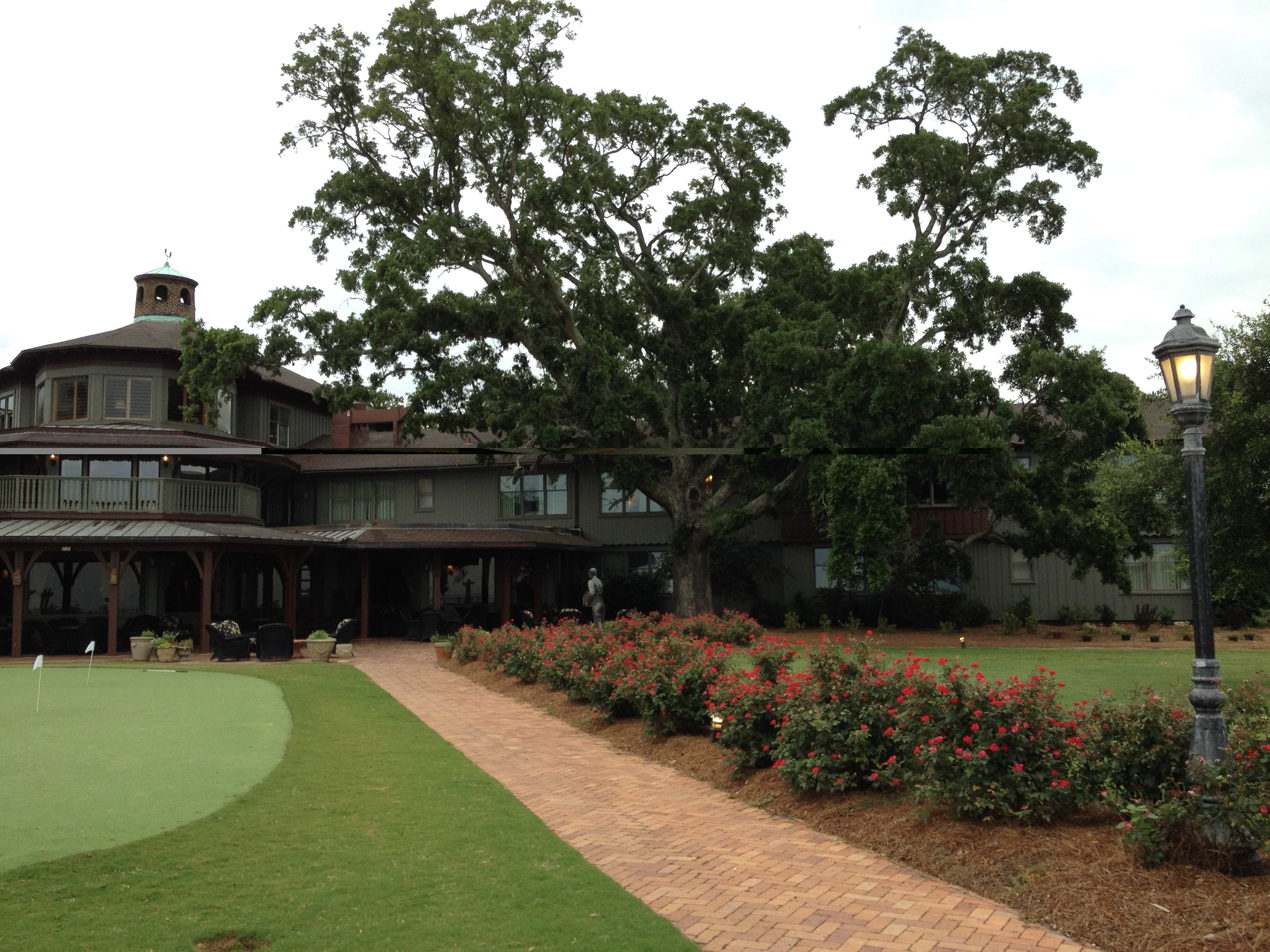

General information
- Location: Point Clear, Alabama

The Grand Hotel in Point Clear, Alabama on Mobile Bay is a historic hotel originally built in 1847. It is listed on the National Registry of the Historic Hotels of America and has been added to the Autograph Collection by Marriott. The original hotel was two-stories with 40 guest rooms.

After the Siege of Vicksburg during the American Civil War, survivors were brought by boat to the hotel, where there were housed and allowed to recuperate. The 1906 Mississippi hurricane destroyed the hotel, and a new structure was built to replace it.

As of 2020, the Grand Hotel include more than 400 rooms across five buildings, including an extensive spa area of 20,000 square feet.

== Point Clear in World War II ==
In 1944, Point Clear's Grand Hotel served as the base of operations for Operation Ivory Soap in World War II. In the Pacific Theater, the United States utilized the Leapfrogging (strategy) as a means of capturing islands held by the Japanese that were of strategic or tactical advantage. The Commander of the U.S. Army Air Corps, Henry "Hap" Arnold, understood the American planes needed mobile air depots to support their efforts in the Pacific. Lieutenant Colonel Matthew Thompson, oversaw Operation Ivory Soap from a Suite in the Grand Hotel. The Nineteenth Century Alabama Hotel housed soldiers and served as a maritime training facility training troops in skills including swimming, special calisthenics, marching, drill, navigation, ship identification, signaling, cargo handling, ship orientation, sail making and amphibious operations. The school produced 5000 trained Army seamen who took part in operations in the Philippines, Iwo Jima, and Guam. The training these troops received thanks to Operation Ivory Soap allowed the soldiers to help save countless lives and aircraft. The name "Ivory Soap" according to Col. Thompson was derived from the fact that like the experimental Aircraft Repair Units the military wanted to deploy, ivory soap floats. The Grand Hotel is still in operation on the eastern shore of Mobile Bay today.
