= Sikorsky R-4 =

Two-seat military helicopter of the 1940s

R-4 / Hoverfly
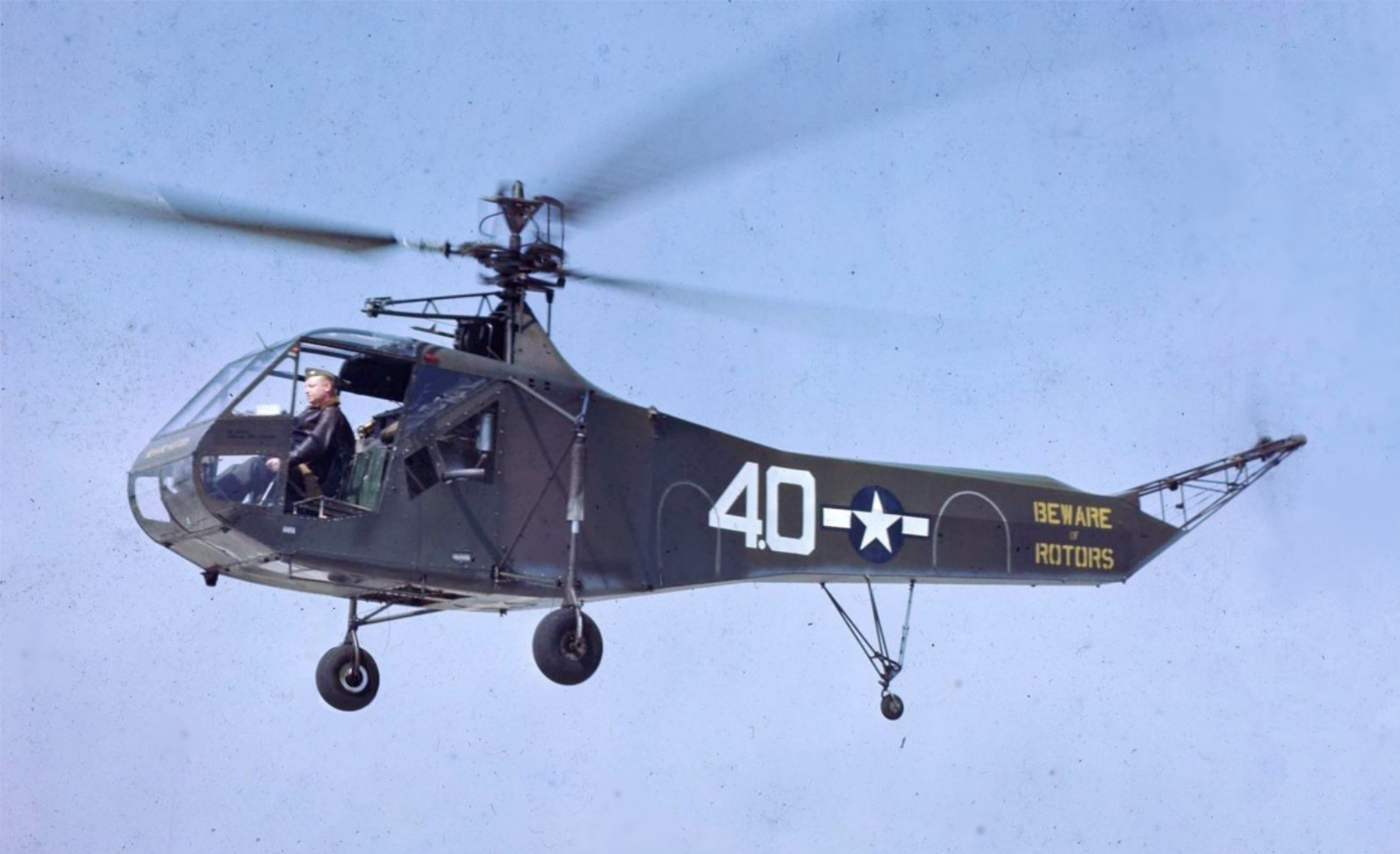
- A Sikorsky R-4 in a hover

General information
- Type: Helicopter
- Manufacturer: Sikorsky Aircraft
- Designer: Igor Sikorsky
- Primary users: United States Army Air Forces United States Coast Guard; Royal Air Force; Royal Navy
- Number built: 131

History
- Manufactured: 1942–1944
- Introduction date: 5 January 1943
- First flight: January 14, 1942
- Developed from: Vought-Sikorsky VS-300
- Developed into: Sikorsky R-6

The Sikorsky R-4 is a two-seat light helicopter that was designed by Igor Sikorsky with a single, three-bladed main rotor and powered by a radial engine. The R-4 was the world's first large-scale mass-produced helicopter and the first helicopter used by the United States Army Air Forces, the United States Navy, the United States Coast Guard, and the United Kingdom's Royal Air Force and Royal Navy. In U.S. Navy and U.S. Coast Guard service, the helicopter was known as the Sikorsky HNS-1. In British service it was known as the Hoverfly.

== Development ==
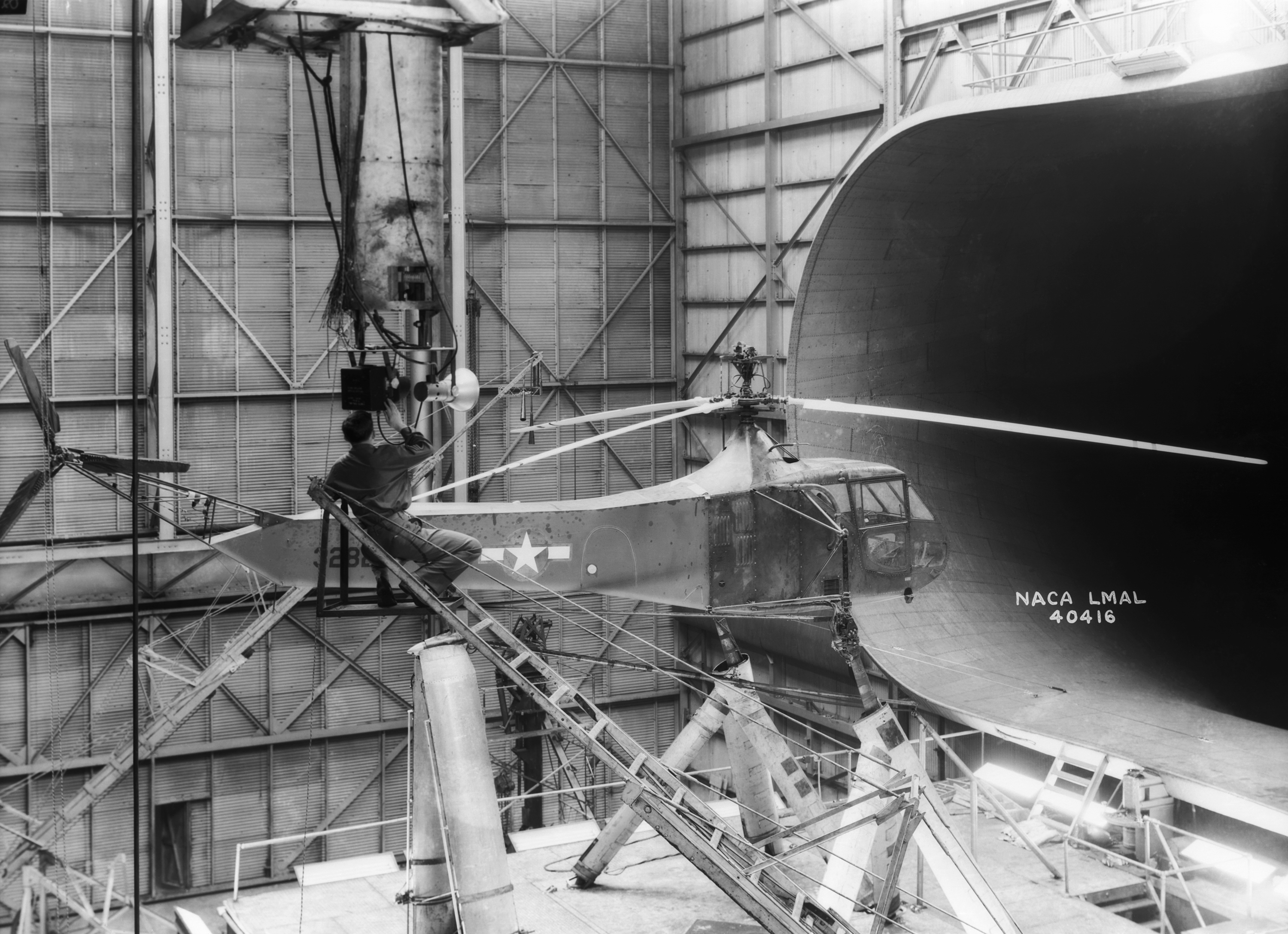
In this image taken in 1944, one of Langley Research Center's Sikorsky YR-4B/HNS-1 helicopters is seen in the 30 × 60 full-scale wind tunnel.

The VS-316 was developed from the famous experimental VS-300 helicopter, invented by Igor Sikorsky and publicly demonstrated in 1940. The VS-316 was designated the XR-4, under the United States Army Air Forces' series for "Rotorcraft". The XR-4 first flew on 14 January 1942 and was accepted by the Army on 30 May 1942. The XR-4 exceeded all the previous helicopter endurance altitude and airspeed records that had been set before it. The XR-4 completed a 761 mi (1,225 km) cross-country flight from Bridgeport, Connecticut, to Wright Field, Ohio, set a helicopter peak altitude record of 12,000 ft (3,700 m), while achieving 100 flight hours without a major incident and top airspeed approaching 90 mph (78 kn; 145 km/h)

The British Admiralty, having learned of the VS-300, made a ship available, Empire Mersey, fitted with an 80 ft × 40 ft (24 m × 12 m) landing platform, intended to show the USN their work with ship-borne autogyros. After her loss in 1942 to a U-boat, she was replaced by SS Daghestan. The first deck-landing trials aboard Daghestan were carried out in 1944. The British received two of the first eight helicopters built.

On 5 January 1943, the United States Army Air Forces ordered 29 prototypes. The first three were designated YR-4A and used for evaluation testing. The YR-4A benefited from a 180 hp (130 kW) Warner R-550-1 Super Scarab engine, compared to the 165 hp (123 kW) Warner R-500-3 in the prototype, and a rotor diameter increased by 1 ft (30 cm). Evaluation of the YR-4A demonstrated a need for further improvements, including moving the tailwheel further aft on the tailboom, venting the exhaust to the side instead of downward, and increasing the fuel capacity by 5 US gal (4.2 imp gal; 19 L). These and other design changes led to the designation of later prototypes as YR-4B, which were used for service testing and flight training.

United Aircraft announced on 5 November 1944 that the one hundredth helicopter had been completed, and that the production rate had reached five every six days.

== Operational history ==
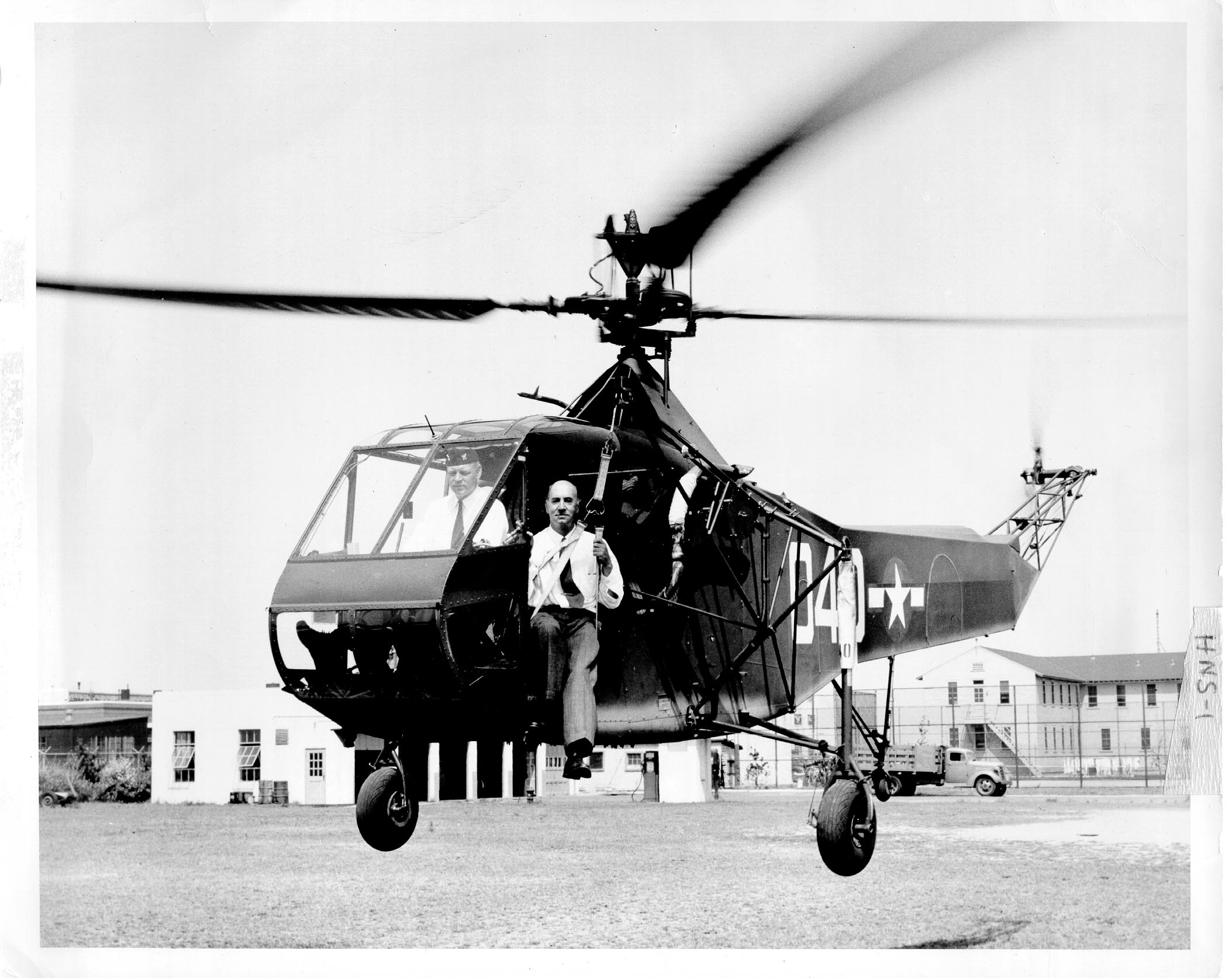
Comdr. Frank A. Erickson, USCG & Dr. Igor Sikorsky, Sikorsky Helicopter HNS-1 C.G. 39040

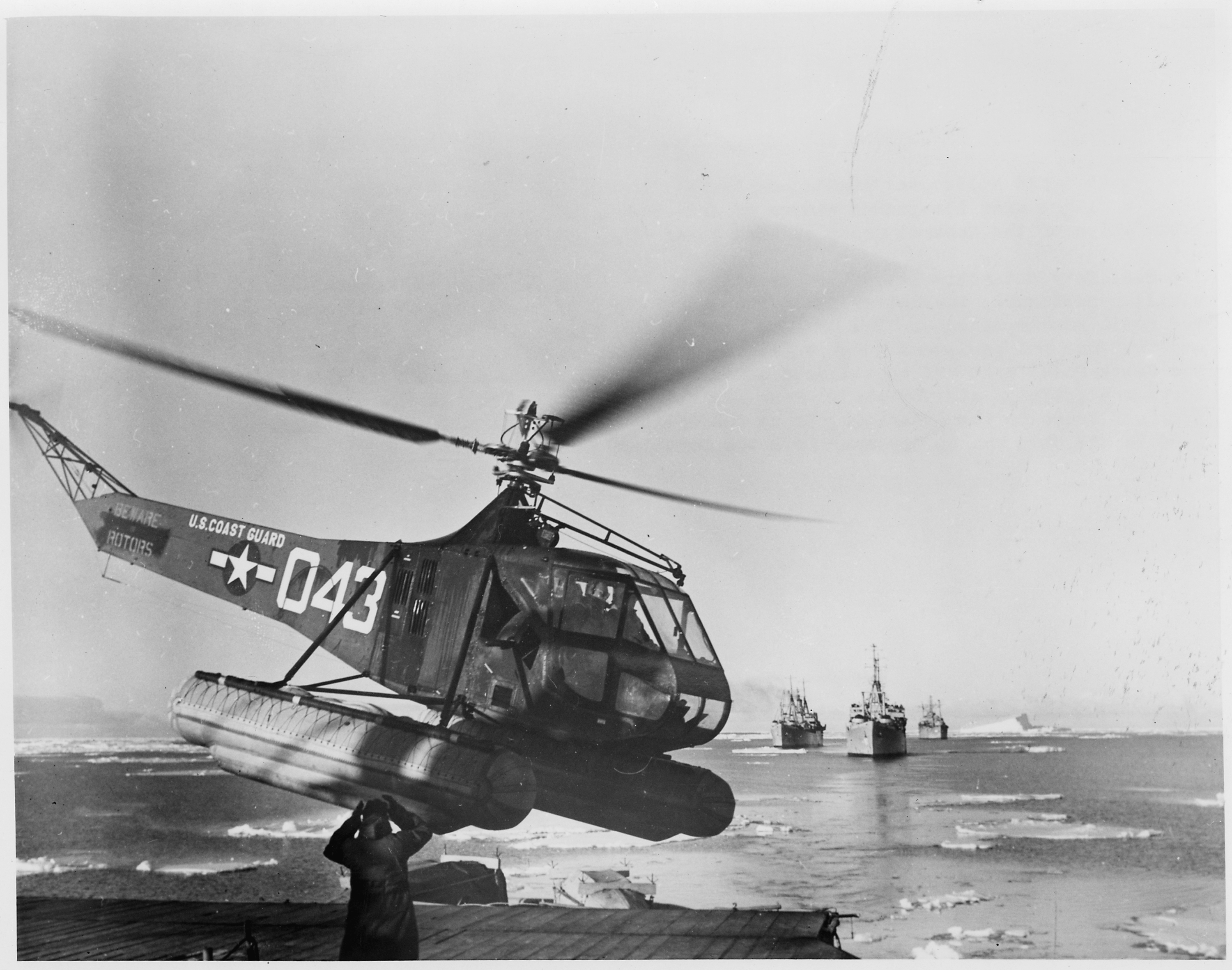
HNS-1 helicopter lands on the icebreaker USCGC Northwind for Operation High Jump (Task Force 68), a mission to Antarctica

Following the explosion and sinking in January 1944 of USS Turner, U.S. Coast Guard Commander Frank Erickson flew the first U.S. helicopter rescue in a Sikorsky R-4 carrying life saving blood plasma for the casualties from New York City. On 22–23 April 1944, U.S. Army Lieutenant Carter Harman of the 1st Air Commando Group conducted the first combat rescue by helicopter using a YR-4B in the China-Burma-India theater. Despite the high altitude, humidity, and capacity for only a single passenger, Harman rescued a downed liaison aircraft pilot and his three British soldier passengers, two at a time. On 22–23 January 1945, another rescue by the R-4 involved several legs for refueling and navigating through passes between mountains nearly 10,000 feet (3,000 m) tall, to reach a weather station located at an elevation of 4,700 feet (1,400 m). The higher-than-normal altitude required a downhill run of 20 ft (6.1 m) to get airborne.

While the R-4 was being used for rescues in Burma and China, it was also being used to ferry parts between floating Aviation Repair Units (part of Operation Ivory Soap) in the South Pacific. On 23 May 1944, six ships set sail with two R-4s on board each vessel. The ships had been configured as floating repair depots for damaged Army Air Forces aircraft in the South Pacific. When the helicopters were not being used to fly the parts from one location to another, they were enlisted for medical evacuation and other mercy missions. Helicopter pilot 2LT Louis Carle was assigned to the Brigadier General Clinton W. Russell, the Fifth Aircraft Repair Unit. From June 15 to July 29, 1945, Carle and five other pilots evacuated 75 to 80 wounded soldiers, one or two at a time, from the highlands northeast of Manila. They were the second group of helicopter pilots after Lieutenant Carter Harman to evacuate wounded via helicopter during World War II. Unlike Harman, they were targeted by Japanese soldiers who tried to shoot them down with machine guns. Their six-week effort constitutes the largest combat helicopter operation before the Korean War.

On June 15, 1945, the Fifth Air Force received a request from the 38th Infantry Division to evacuate two soldiers with head injuries from a spot 35 miles (56 km) east of Manila. Carle flew one of his ship's Sikorsky R-4 helicopters and landed near the front lines, much to the amazement of the soldiers, who had never seen a helicopter. The helicopter was not configured to handle stretchers, and they removed a seat and placed the wounded man on the aircraft floor. Carle flew the soldier to the 311th General Field Hospital near Manila. Once word got out of their availability, they were called on again and again. Carle flew seven hours and made six evacuations on the same day.

In Royal Air Force service, the R-4 was called the Hoverfly. The Helicopter Training School, formed January 1945 at RAF Andover, was the first British military unit to be equipped with the helicopter. Many RAF Hoverfly Mark Is were transferred to the Royal Navy for training and one was used in 1945–46 by Fairey Aviation to develop rotor systems for their Gyrodyne helicopter.

=== Piloting difficulty ===
The helicopter was difficult to fly. The aircraft's blades were made of wood ribs around a steel spar and covered with doped fabric. The blades were difficult to keep rotating in the same plane and vibrated excessively. The cyclic made continuous small orbits, vibrating continuously. There was no governor to control rotor speed, and the pilot had to correlate the throttle continuously with collective pitch inputs. The Chicago Tribune reported on Carle's efforts to transport the wounded. They wrote that the "control stick shakes like a jackhammer, and the pilot must hold it tightly at all times. Should he relax for even a minute the plane falls out of control. Pilots of regular planes say it's easy to identify a helicopter pilot – he has a permanent case of the shakes."

== Variants ==
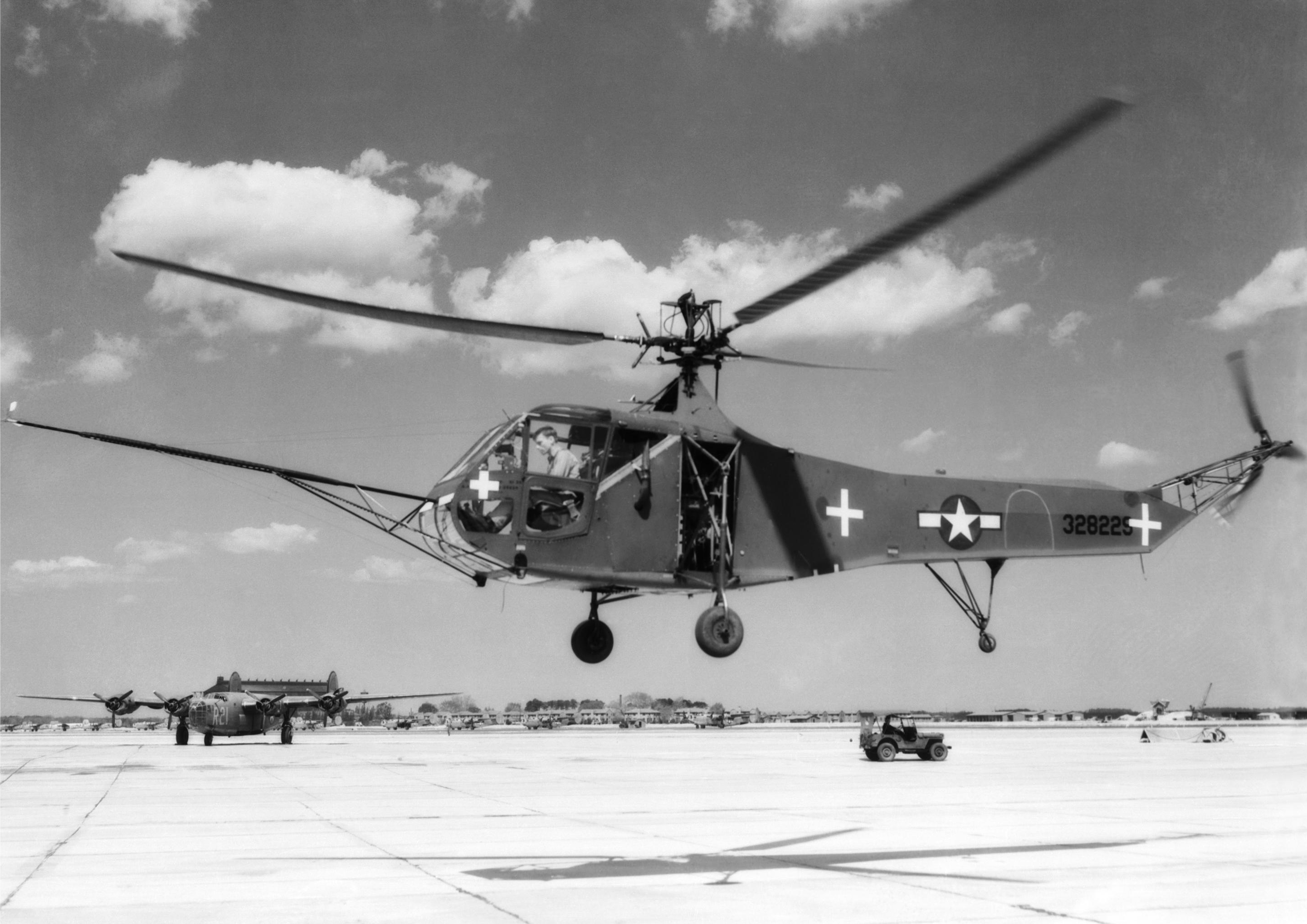
YR-4B at Langley

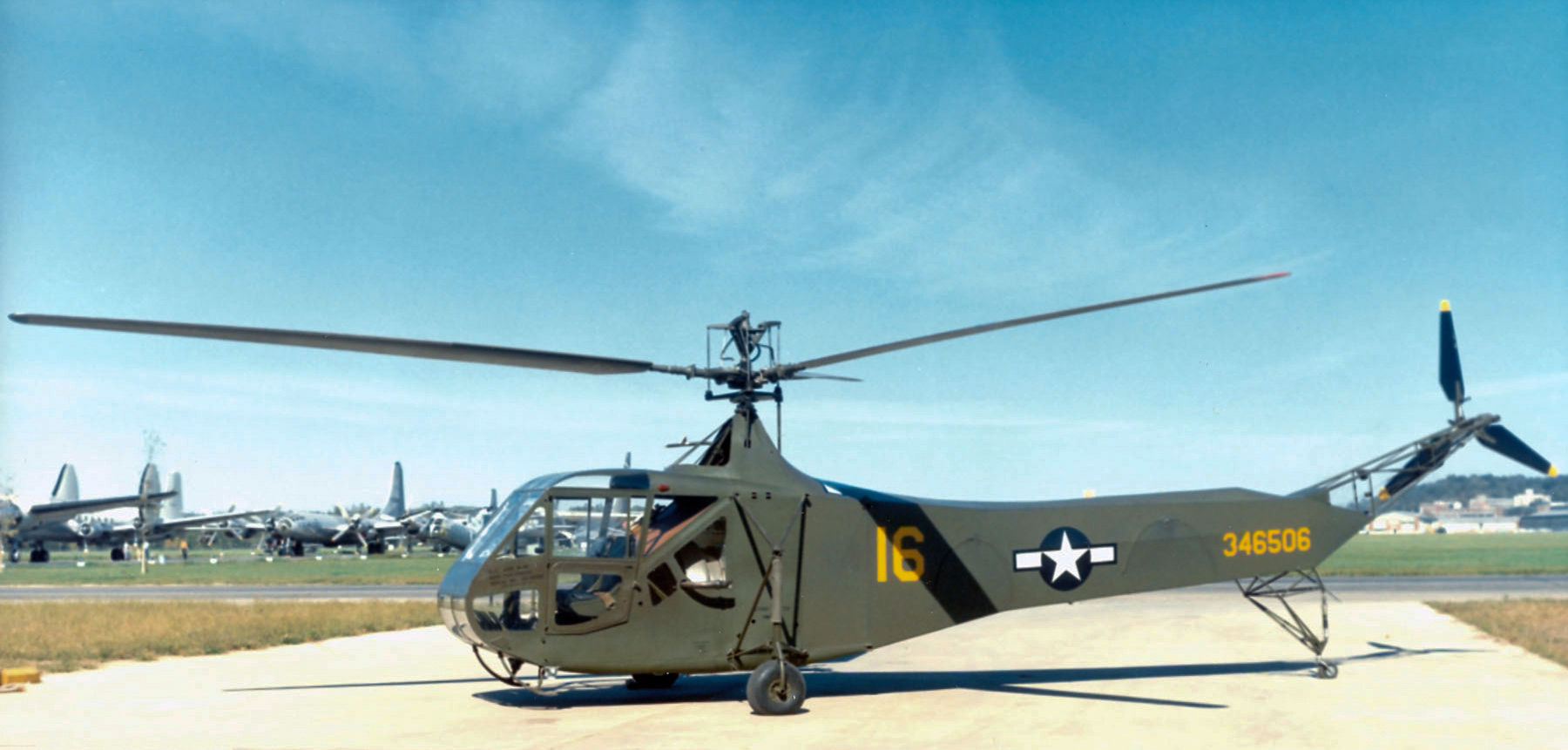
Sikorsky R-4B at National Museum of the United States Air Force

XR-4
One prototype Model VS-316A with a crew of two and dual controls, Warner R-500-3 165 hp (123 kW) engine, became XR-4C
YR-4A
Version with larger rotor diameter and a Warner R-550-1 180 hp (130 kW) engine; three built.
YR-4B
Version with detailed changes; 27 built for development testing followed by a further batch of 14, seven to U.S. Navy as HNS-1s.
R-4B
Production version with a Warner R-550-3 200 hp (150 kW) engine; 100 built including 20 for the U.S. Navy and 45 for the Royal Air Force.
XR-4C
Prototype XR-4 re-engined with a Warner R-550-1 180 hp (130 kW) engine with the larger YR-4A-type rotor.
HNS-1
Three YR-4Bs and 22 R-4Bs transferred to the U.S. Navy; three diverted to the U.S. Coast Guard.
Hoverfly I
UK military designation of the R-4 for the Royal Air Force and Royal Navy; 52 delivered and one later transferred to the Royal Canadian Air Force. 133 were built
Sikorsky S-54
An R-4B modified as a sesqui-tandem helicopter with an observer's seat aft of the main rotor gearbox for trials. First flown on December 20, 1948.

== Operators ==
United Kingdom

- Fleet Air Arm
  - 703 Naval Air Squadron
  - 705 Naval Air Squadron
  - 771 Naval Air Squadron
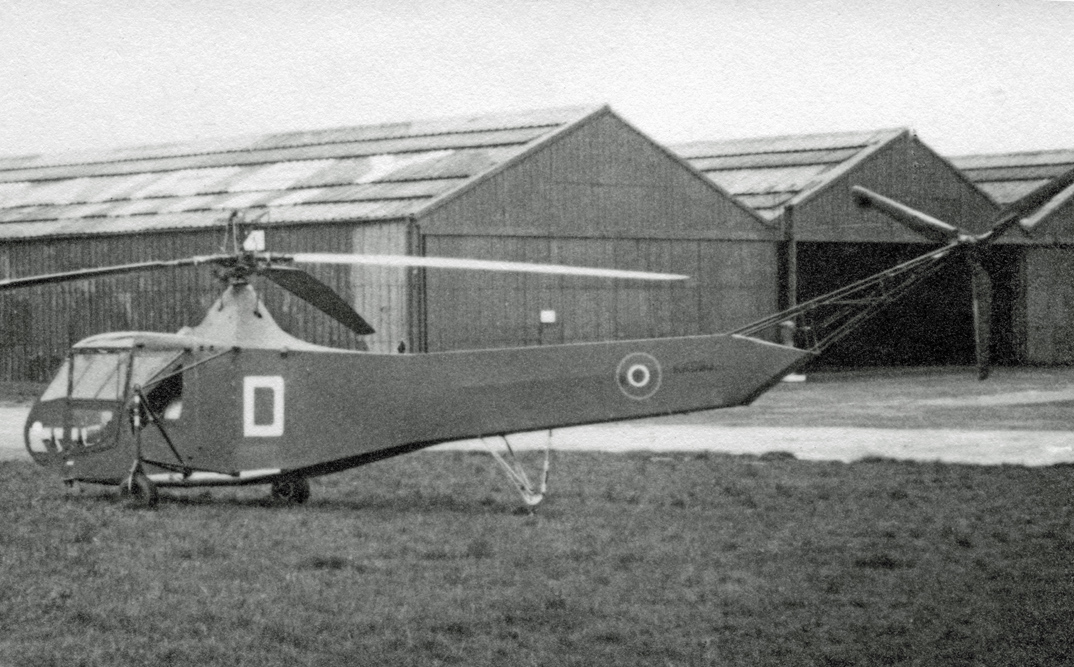
    Royal Air Force Hoverfly I in use by Fairey Aviation in late 1945
  - Royal Naval Flying School
- Royal Air Force
  - Helicopter Training Flight
  - No. 529 Squadron RAF
  - No. 657 Squadron RAF

United States

- United States Army Air Forces
- United States Coast Guard
- United States Navy

== Surviving aircraft ==
Canada

- 43-46565 – R-4B in the storage at the Canada Aviation and Space Museum in Ottawa, Ontario. It was acquired by the Museum in 1983.

United Kingdom

- KL110 – Hoverfly I on display at RAF Hooton Park near Ellesmere Port having previously been on display at the Royal Air Force Museum London in London. Supplied under lend-lease, it arrived in Britain in February 1945. It flew with the RAF, later the Royal Navy, until 1951. It was used by the College of Aeronautics, Cranfield until it was presented to the RAF museum in 1966.

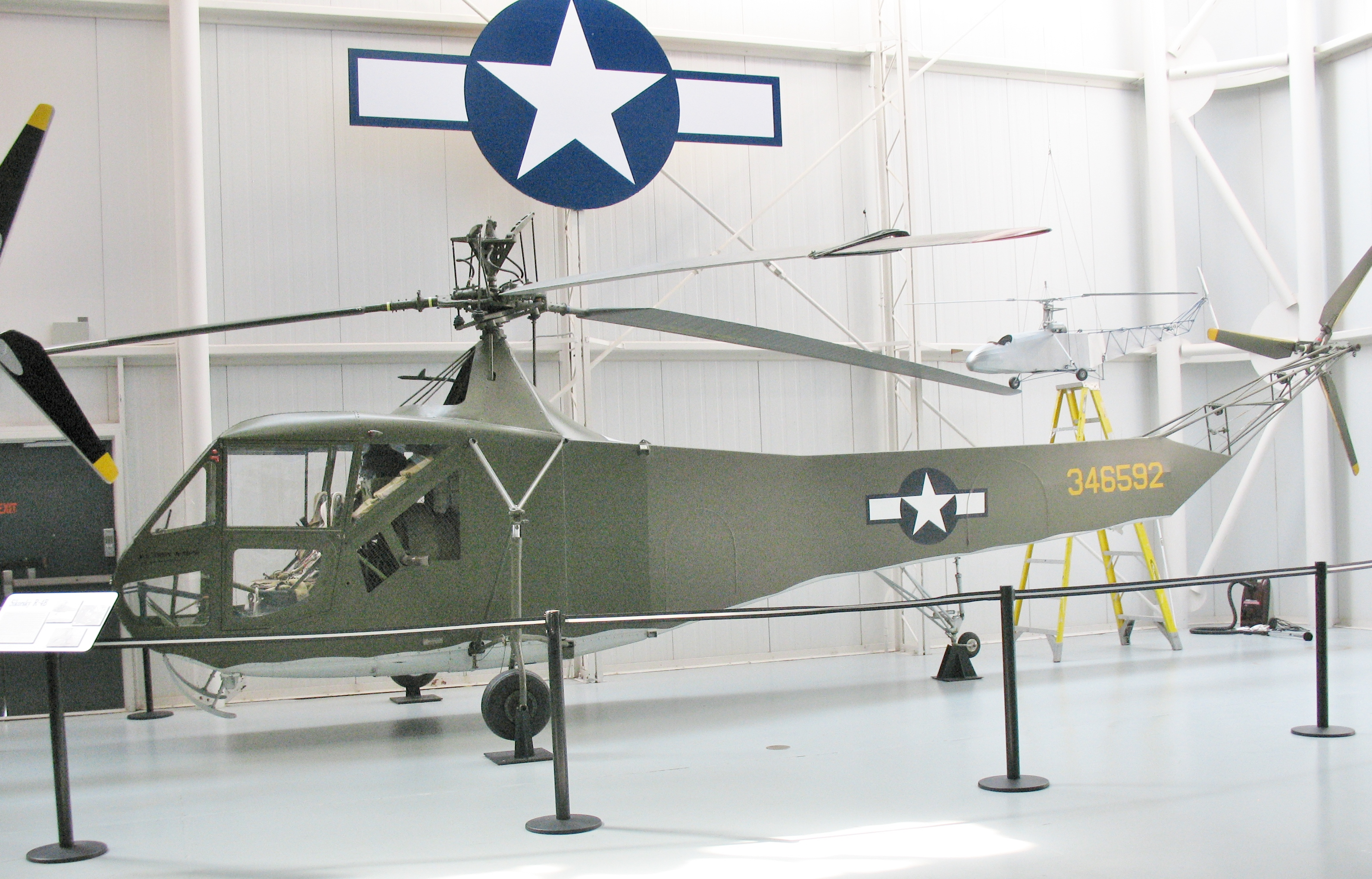
R-4B Hoverfly, US Army Aviation Museum

United States

- 41-18874 – XR-4C on static display at the Steven F. Udvar-Hazy Center of the National Air and Space Museum in Chantilly, Virginia.
- 43-46503 – R-4B on static display at the New England Air Museum in Windsor Locks, Connecticut.
- 43-46506 – R-4B on static display at the National Museum of the United States Air Force in Dayton, Ohio. It was donated by the University of Illinois in 1967.
- 43-46521 – R-4B on static display at the National Museum of the United States Army at Fort Belvoir near Mount Vernon, Virginia.
- 43-46534 – R-4B under restoration at Yanks Air Museum in Chino, California.
- 43-46592 – R-4B on static display at the United States Army Aviation Museum at Fort Rucker near Daleville, Alabama.
- 39047 – HNS-1 on static display at the National Museum of Naval Aviation in Pensacola, Florida.
- c/n 95 – R-4B in storage with the Commemorative Air Force in Dallas, Texas.

== Specifications (R-4B) ==
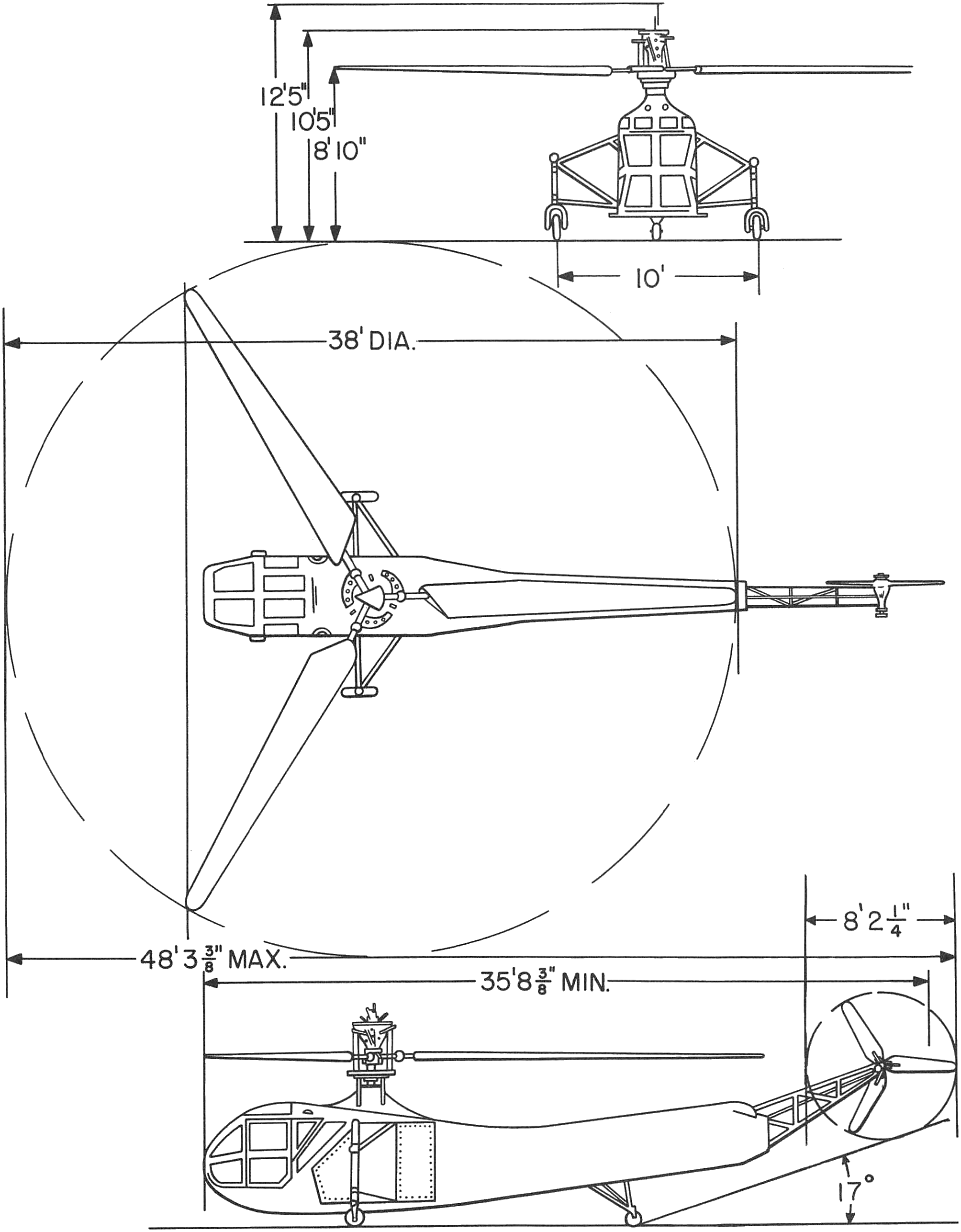
3-view line drawing of the Sikorsky R-4

Data from

General characteristics

- Crew: 2
- Capacity: 1x casualty litter carried externally
- Length: 48 ft 1 in (14.66 m) rotors turning

33 ft 8 in (10 m) fuselage only

- Height: 12 ft 5 in (3.78 m)
- Empty weight: 2,011 lb (912 kg)
- Gross weight: 2,540 lb (1,152 kg)
- Powerplant: 1 × Warner R-550-1 7-cylinder air-cooled radial piston engine, 185 hp (138 kW)
- Main rotor diameter: 38 ft (12 m)
- Main rotor area: 1,134 sq ft (105.4 m^{2})

Performance

- Maximum speed: 75 mph (121 km/h, 65 kn)
- Cruise speed: 65 mph (105 km/h, 56 kn)
- Range: 130 mi (210 km, 110 nmi)
- Service ceiling: 8,000 ft (2,400 m)
- Time to altitude: 8,000 ft (2,438 m) in 45 minutes

== See also ==
Related development

- Vought-Sikorsky VS-300
- Sikorsky R-5

Aircraft of comparable role, configuration, and era

- Focke-Achgelis Fa 223
- Flettner Fl 282
- Platt-LePage XR-1
