= Carter Harman =

American composer, writer, and music industry executive

Carter Harman (June 4, 1918; Brooklyn, New York – January 23, 2007; Stowe, Vermont) was a composer, writer, and music industry executive. During World War II, Harman achieved particular distinction for his service in the U.S. Army Air Forces. He piloted the first mission by a U.S. military helicopter in a combat zone in 1944. In 1945, the U.S. Army awarded him the Distinguished Flying Cross for these efforts. Harman later rendered service to the music industry over a career spanning the 1940s through the 1980s. In 1981, BMI awarded him their Commendation of Excellence, and the American Composers Alliance awarded him their Laurel Leaf Award.

== Early life and education ==
Harman was born in the New York City Borough of Brooklyn on June 4, 1918. He began musical studies at age nine by learning how to play the clarinet. After graduating from the Morristown School (now Morristown-Beard School) in Morristown, New Jersey, Harman received his bachelor's degree with high honors from Princeton University in Princeton, New Jersey. During his time at Princeton, he studied under composer Roger Sessions, who won two Pulitzer Prizes. Harman served as music editor of the Nassau Lit, the college literary magazine at Princeton. He also participated in the choir and band.

Following his service in the U.S. military during World War II, Harman completed his master's degree at Columbia University in Manhattan in 1949. He studied under Otto Luening, a German-American pioneer of tape music and electronic music.

== Military career ==
Before World War II, Harman flew Piper and Waco aircraft. In 1943, he completed air force training in class 43-C of an Army Air Corps training program in Texas. Harman then served as a flight instructor for primary training. He later joined the first class of helicopter pilots (five in total) of the U.S. Army Air Services. The group trained at Sikorsky Aircraft's headquarters in Stratford, Connecticut, to learn to pilot the YR-4B, an early military helicopter. (The R stood for rotary aircraft.) The YR-4B carried no onboard weapons. It featured a cruising speed of 65 miles per hour and a range of 130 miles.

On April 21, 1944, the Japanese Imperial Army in Burma shot down a Stinson L-1 Vigilant rescue aircraft piloted by American Murphy Hladovack, which carried three wounded British soldiers. After a Stinson L-5 Sentinel aircraft spotted the group, the 1st Air Commando Group tasked Harman with rescuing them. His YR-4B was the only working helicopter among the four used by the group. The limited range of the YR-4B and small size of its cabin constrained how Harman managed the rescue operation. Harman had to transport the soldiers one by one to a liaison L-5 plane waiting at a designated sandbar and without the aid of weaponry. Over the span of two days, he ferried the soldiers to this plane to bring them to safety. The book Chopper: Firsthand Accounts of Helicopter Warfare, World War II to Iraq chronicles Harman's account of this first mission by a military helicopter.

== Writing and music industry career ==
Following World War II, Harman resumed his a career as a music critic, which spanned two decades. He wrote articles for The New York Times (1947–1952) and Time (1952-1957). Harman also composed a ballet titled Blackface, an opera titled The Food of Love, and several children's songs. Recorded by Broadway star Mary Martin, his children's songs were released as the album Mary Martin Sings for Children.

Starting in the 1950s and continuing into the 1960s, Harman worked as a music critic in Puerto Rico. In 1956 he began his career as a record producer, working with Emory Cook, founder of Cook Records. In 1967, Harman joined Composer Recordings, Inc. (CRI), a producer of contemporary classical music (now part of New World Records), as their executive vice president. He later served as the company's executive director from 1976 to 1981.

During his music industry and writing career, Harman served as the sound recorder for the 1963 film Lord of the Flies. Directed by Peter Brook and produced by Lewis M. Allen, the film represented a British adaptation of William Golding's 1954 novel with the same name. Harman also authored three books. His first book discussed music history up through the Jazz Age. Harman's later books examined the West Indies, a collaboration with his wife, Helen Scott Harman and editors at Life magazine (1963), and building activities to construct skyscrapers.

== Family ==
Harman married Nancy Hallinan, a graduate of Vassar College, on February 5, 1946. They divorced and he married his second wife, Helen Scott. They had four children together: Lisa, Bruce, Scott, and Alex, who were all born in Puerto Rico. Carter later married his third wife, Wanda Maximilien

== Works ==
- A Popular History of Music — From Gregorian Chant to Jazz (1956)
- The West Indies (1963)
- A Skyscraper Goes Up (1973)
