= Point Clear, Alabama =

- Census-designated place (CDP) & Unincorporated community
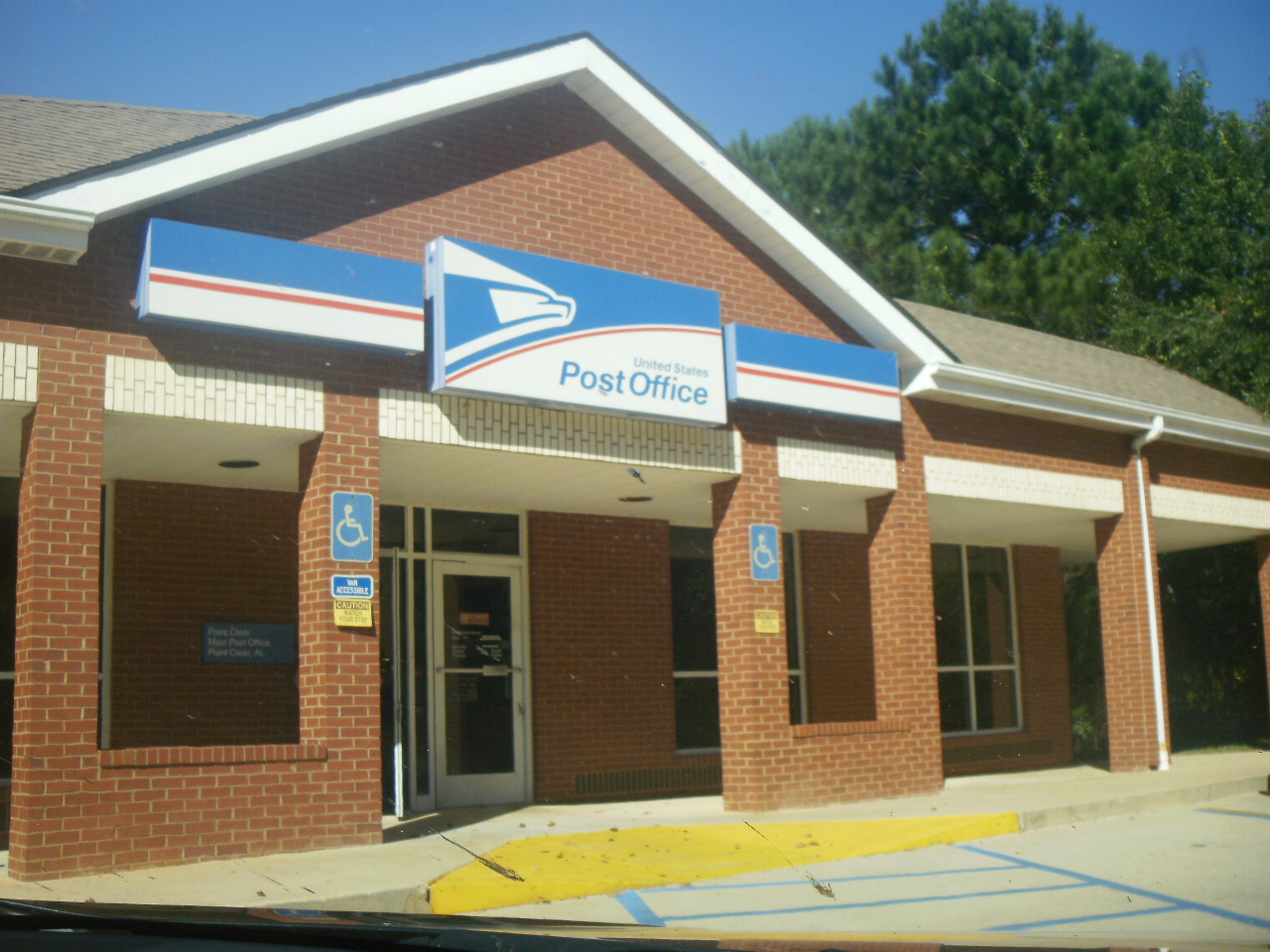
- Point Clear, Alabama Post Office

- Location in Baldwin County and the state of Alabama
- Coordinates: 30°29′24″N 87°54′28″W
- Country: United States
- State: Alabama
- County: Baldwin

Area
  - Total: 4.63 sq mi (11.99 km^{2})
  - Land: 4.59 sq mi (11.89 km^{2})
  - Water: 0.035 sq mi (0.09 km^{2})
- Elevation: 20 ft (6.1 m)

Population (2020)
  - Total: 2,076
  - Density: 452.1/sq mi (174.54/km^{2})
- Time zone: UTC-6 (Central (CST))
  - Summer (DST): UTC-5 (CDT)
- ZIP code: 36564
- Area code: 251
- FIPS code: 01-61488
- GNIS feature ID: 2403433

Point Clear is an unincorporated census-designated place (CDP) in Baldwin County, Alabama, United States. As of the 2020 census, Point Clear had a population of 2,076. It is part of the Daphne-Fairhope-Foley metropolitan area.

== Geography ==
According to the U.S. Census Bureau, the community has a total area of 5.5 square miles (14 km^{2}), of which 5.5 square miles (14 km^{2}) is land and 0.43% is water.

== Demographics ==
Historical population
Census	Pop.	Note	%±
1880	49		—
1980	1,812		—
1990	2,125		17.3%
2000	1,876		−11.7%
2010	2,125		13.3%
2020	2,076		−2.3%
U.S. Decennial Census

Point Clear first appeared as a census designated place in the 1980 U.S. Census

=== Racial and ethnic composition ===
Point Clear CDP, Alabama – Racial and ethnic composition Note: the US Census treats Hispanic/Latino as an ethnic category. This table excludes Latinos from the racial categories and assigns them to a separate category. Hispanics/Latinos may be of any race.
Race / Ethnicity (NH = Non-Hispanic)	Pop 2000	Pop 2010	Pop 2020	% 2000	% 2010	% 2020
White alone (NH)	1,050	1,244	1,356	55.97%	58.54%	65.32%
Black or African American alone (NH)	799	838	607	42.59%	39.44%	29.24%
Native American or Alaska Native alone (NH)	2	1	0	0.11%	0.05%	0.00%
Asian alone (NH)	3	12	7	0.16%	0.56%	0.34%
Native Hawaiian or Pacific Islander alone (NH)	0	0	1	0.00%	0.00%	0.05%
Other race alone (NH)	0	2	0	0.00%	0.09%	0.00%
Mixed race or Multiracial (NH)	11	8	58	0.59%	0.38%	2.79%
Hispanic or Latino (any race)	11	20	47	0.59%	0.94%	2.26%
Total	1,876	2,125	2,076	100.00%	100.00%	100.00%

=== 2020 census ===
As of the 2020 census, Point Clear had a population of 2,076. The median age was 54.6 years. 17.2% of residents were under the age of 18 and 31.0% of residents were 65 years of age or older. For every 100 females there were 92.0 males, and for every 100 females age 18 and over there were 90.8 males age 18 and over.

100.0% of residents lived in urban areas, while 0.0% lived in rural areas.

There were 875 households and 639 families in Point Clear, of which 22.9% had children under the age of 18 living in them. Of all households, 56.8% were married-couple households, 13.8% were households with a male householder and no spouse or partner present, and 25.8% were households with a female householder and no spouse or partner present. About 25.7% of all households were made up of individuals and 13.3% had someone living alone who was 65 years of age or older.

There were 1,162 housing units, of which 24.7% were vacant. The homeowner vacancy rate was 3.0% and the rental vacancy rate was 15.8%.

=== 2000 census ===
As of the census of 2000, there were 1,876 people, 741 households, and 546 families residing in the community. The population density was 331.1 inhabitants per square mile (127.8/km^{2}). There were 997 housing units at an average density of 176.0 per square mile (68.0/km^{2}). The racial makeup of the community was 56.13% White, 42.70% Black or African American, 0.16% Native American, 0.16% Asian, 0.05% from other races, and 0.80% from two or more races. 0.59% of the population were Hispanic or Latino of any race.

There were 741 households, out of which 27.5% had children under the age of 18 living with them, 54.7% were married couples living together, 15.2% had a female householder with no husband present, and 26.2% were non-families. 23.8% of all households were made up of individuals, and 10.5% had someone living alone who was 65 years of age or older. The average household size was 2.53 and the average family size was 2.98.

In the community, the population was spread out, with 23.8% under the age of 18, 6.6% from 18 to 24, 24.1% from 25 to 44, 28.1% from 45 to 64, and 17.3% who were 65 years of age or older. The median age was 43 years. For every 100 females, there were 94.8 males. For every 100 females age 18 and over, there were 90.8 males.

The median income for a household in the community was $37,305, and the median income for a family was $45,729. Males had a median income of $39,844 versus $14,556 for females. The per capita income for the community was $26,271. About 16.1% of families and 18.1% of the population were below the poverty line, including 30.2% of those under age 18 and 16.7% of those age 65 or over.

== Point Clear in World War II ==
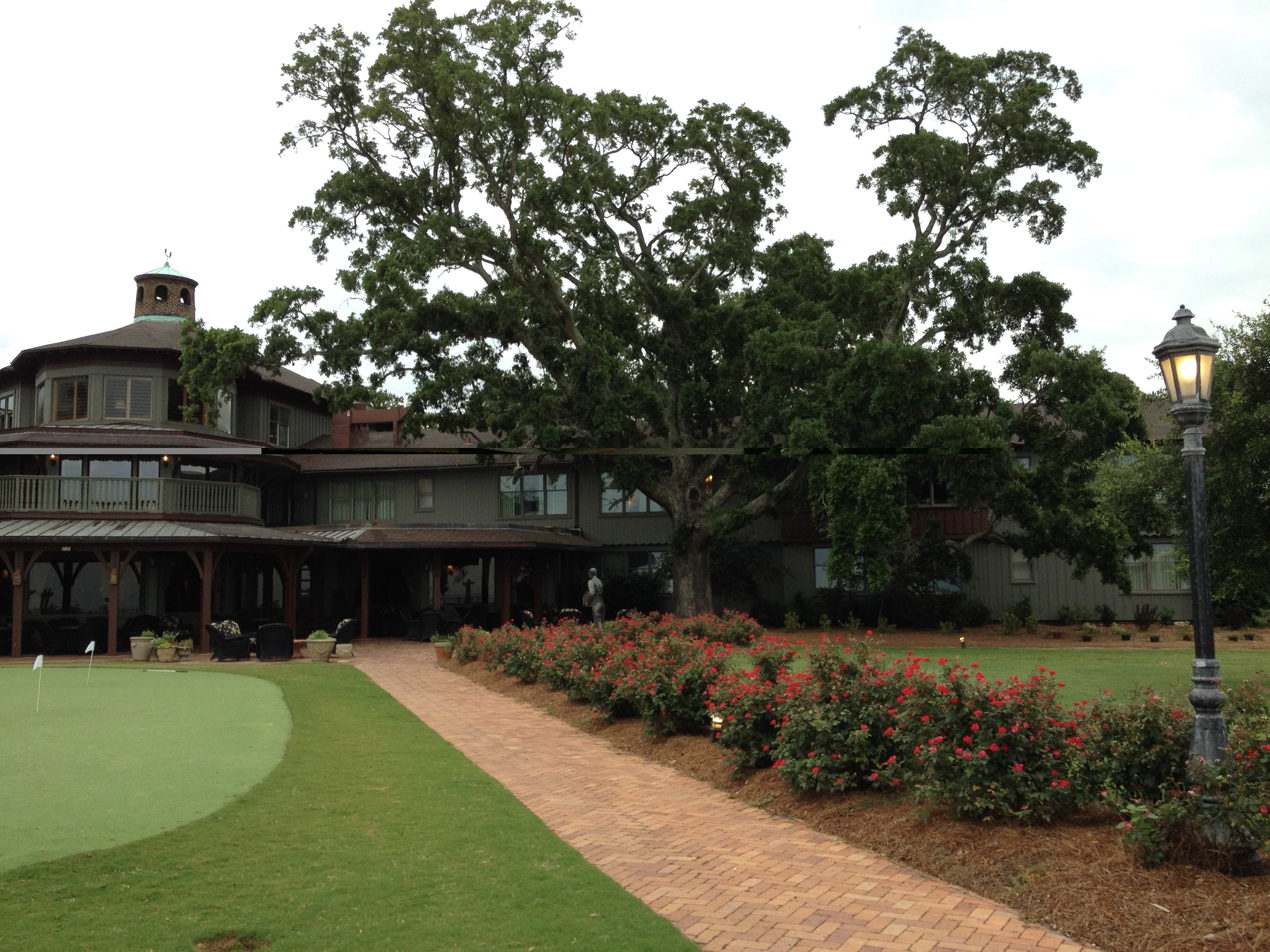
Grand Hotel, Point Clear Alabama

In 1944, Point Clear's Grand Hotel served as the base of operations for Operation Ivory Soap in World War II. In the Pacific Theater, the United States utilized the Leapfrogging (strategy) as a means of capturing islands held by the Japanese that were of strategic or tactical advantage. The commander of the U.S. Army Air Corps, Henry "Hap" Arnold, understood the American planes needed mobile air depots to support their efforts in the Pacific. Lieutenant Colonel Matthew Thompson, oversaw Operation Ivory Soap from a suite in the Grand Hotel. The nineteenth-century Alabama hotel housed soldiers and served as a maritime training facility training troops in skills including swimming, special calisthenics, marching, drill, navigation, ship identification, signaling, cargo handling, ship orientation, sail making and amphibious operations. The school produced 5,000 trained Army seamen who took part in operations in the Philippines, Iwo Jima, and Guam. The training these troops received thanks to Operation Ivory Soap allowed the soldiers to help save countless lives and aircraft. The name "Ivory Soap," according to Col. Thompson, was derived from the fact that, like the experimental Aircraft Repair Units the military wanted to deploy, Ivory soap floats. The Grand Hotel is still in operation on the eastern shore of Mobile Bay today.

== Other ==
From as early as the 1800s, wealthy families from Mobile, New Orleans and across the United States chose to spend their summers in Point Clear. In the days of yellow fever outbreaks, Pt. Clear residents believed they were escaping to what was deemed as "good air" because of the daily breeze off Mobile Bay. Arrival to the area was traditionally by ferry boat and most people arrived in Pt. Clear at Zundel's Wharf. Because of this, the front of the homes (sometimes referred to as cottages) face Mobile Bay and there is a boardwalk between the water and the homes leading to and from Zundel's Wharf. Remnants of the old pier at the Zundel property were still visible prior to Hurricane Katrina in 2005.

=== Education ===
The school district is Baldwin County Public Schools.

== See also ==
- Eastern Shore
