= National Register of Historic Places listings in Birmingham, Alabama =

Birmingham and its surrounding area

This is a list of the National Register of Historic Places listings in Birmingham, Alabama.

This is intended to be a complete list of the properties and districts on the National Register of Historic Places in Birmingham, Alabama, United States. Latitude and longitude coordinates are provided for many National Register properties and districts; these locations may be seen together in an online map.

There are 178 properties and districts listed on the National Register in Jefferson County, including 3 National Historic Landmarks. 148 of these sites, including all of the National Historic Landmarks, are located in Birmingham, and are listed here, while 31 sites are listed separately. One district, the Red Mountain Suburbs Historic District, includes contributing properties located in the city of Birmingham and in adjacent parts of Jefferson County.

This National Park Service list is complete through NPS recent listings posted September 25, 2026.

== Current listings ==
	Name on the Register	Image	Date listed	Location	Community	Description
1	Age-Herald Building	Age-Herald Building	August 30, 1984 (#84000620)	2107 5th Ave., N. 33°31′07″N 86°48′22″W	Northside	
2	Agee House	Agee House	August 28, 1986 (#86001962)	1804 12th Ave., S. 33°29′55″N 86°47′54″W	Southside	
3	Alabama Penny Savings Bank	Alabama Penny Savings Bank	March 10, 1980 (#80004471)	310 18th St., N. 33°30′54″N 86°48′37″W	Northside	
4	Alabama Theatre	Alabama Theatre	November 13, 1979 (#79000386)	1811 3rd Ave. N. 33°30′54″N 86°48′33″W	Northside	
5	American Laundry Company Building		November 6, 2024 (#100010966)	1630 2nd Avenue S. 33°30′32″N 86°48′28″W	Southside	
6	Anderson Place Historic District	Anderson Place Historic District	August 28, 1986 (#86001981)	Roughly bounded by 14th Ave., S., 18th St., S., 16th Ave., S., and 15th St., S.; also roughly 16th Ave., S. from 15th St. to a line south from 18th St. 33°29′37″N 86°48′00″W	Southside	Second set of boundaries represents a boundary increase of June 15, 1991
7	Arlington	Arlington	December 2, 1970 (#70000103)	331 Cotton Ave., SW. 33°29′59″N 86°50′20″W	West End	
8	Arlington Park	Arlington Park	February 17, 1995 (#95000097)	800-840 1st St., W., 815-909 2nd St., W., and 100-269 Munger Ave. 33°29′58″N 86°50′12″W	West End	
9	Automotive Historic District	Automotive Historic District	May 30, 1991 (#91000661)	Roughly bounded by 1st Ave., N., 24th St., S., 5th Ave., S., and 20th St., S. 33°30′45″N 86°48′04″W	Southside	
10	Avalon	Avalon	March 7, 1985 (#85000444)	3005-3015 Highland Ave. and 3000-3020 13th Ave. S 33°30′18″N 86°46′48″W	Red Mountain	
11	Avondale Park Historic District	Avondale Park Historic District	February 20, 1998 (#98000106)	Roughly bounded by 47th St., 7th Ave., 8th Court, 34th St., and State Route 4; 33°31′09″N 86°46′21″W	Red Mountain	
12	Bank of Ensley	Bank of Ensley	June 21, 1984 (#84000623)	19th St. Ensley and Ave. E 33°30′47″N 86°53′50″W	Ensley	
13	Belcher-Nixon Building	Belcher-Nixon Building	August 12, 2009 (#09000603)	1728 20th St. Ensley; 33°30′34″N 86°53′10″W	Ensley	Location of a club in the area that inspired the song "Tuxedo Junction"
14	Belview Heights Historic District	Belview Heights Historic District	June 22, 2000 (#00000713)	Roughly along 41st, 42nd, 43rd, 44th and 45th Sts., and M and Martin Aves. 33°29′26″N 86°53′28″W	Five Points West	
15	Bethel Baptist Church, Parsonage, and Guardhouse	Bethel Baptist Church, Parsonage, and Guardhouse	April 5, 2005 (#05000455)	3233, 3232, and 3236 29th Ave., N. 33°33′07″N 86°48′06″W	North Birmingham	
16	Birmingham Civil Rights Historic District	Birmingham Civil Rights Historic District	October 19, 2006 (#06000940)	Roughly bounded by 9th Ave., Richard Arrington Jr. Boulevard, 1st Ave., and 14th St. 33°31′19″N 86°48′42″W	Northside	
17	Birmingham Food Terminal Historic District		September 30, 2026 (#100004619)	Finley Ave. W. between 3rd Pl. W. and 1st St. W. 33°32′10″N 86°50′24″W		
18	Birmingham, Railway, Light and Power Building	Birmingham, Railway, Light and Power Building	March 11, 1980 (#80000688)	2100 1st Ave. N. 33°30′55″N 86°48′15″W	Northside	
19	Birmingham–Southern College	Birmingham–Southern College	April 22, 1999 (#99000466)	Arkadelphia Rd. between 8th Ave., W. and Interstates 20/59; 33°30′46″N 86°51′07″W	Five Points West	
20	Birmingham Wholesale & Retail (West) Historic District		August 19, 2024 (#100004132)	1st through 6 Aves. N. Bet. 11th and 16th Sts. N. 33°30′45″N 86°49′04″W	Northside	
21	Birmingham Wholesale Warehouse Loop West Historic District	Birmingham Wholesale Warehouse Loop West Historic District	July 21, 2015 (#15000429)	Roughly bounded by railroad lines, 14th St., S., 2nd Ave., S., and Interstate 65; 33°31′52″N 86°49′47″W	Southside	
22	Blessed Sacrament Academy	Blessed Sacrament Academy	November 28, 1980 (#80000689)	1525 Cotton Ave., SW. 33°29′21″N 86°51′24″W	West End	
23	Blessed Sacrament Catholic Church	Blessed Sacrament Catholic Church	July 21, 2015 (#15000430)	1460 Pearson Ave. SW. 33°29′20″N 86°51′20″W	West End	
24	Bottega Favorita	Bottega Favorita	August 28, 1986 (#86001952)	2240-2244 Highland Ave. 33°30′04″N 86°47′24″W	Southside	
25	Bradshaw House	Bradshaw House	April 28, 1980 (#80000690)	2154 Highland Ave. 33°30′00″N 86°47′30″W	Southside	Built in 1892.
26	Dr. A.M. Brown House	Dr. A.M. Brown House	June 20, 1974 (#74000413)	319 N. 4th Terrace; 33°30′34″N 86°49′51″W	Smithfield	
27	Bush Hills Historic District		August 19, 2024 (#100004133)	Roughly bounded by Princeton Pkwy. W, 3rd Ave. W, Bush Blvd., I-20/59, 8th Court W, and 8th Ave. W 33°30′30″N 86°50′34″W	Five Points West	
28	Caldwell-Milner Building	Caldwell-Milner Building	November 8, 1979 (#79000387)	2015 1st Ave., N. 33°30′52″N 86°48′17″W	Northside	
29	Center Street Historic District	Center Street Historic District	October 1, 2007 (#07001027)	940-1145 Center St., 2-9th Ct., W., 4-10th Ave., N., 2-4 10th Ct., N., 16-24 11th Ave., N., and 1-2 11th Ct., N. 33°31′17″N 86°50′10″W	Smithfield	
30	Chestnut Hill Historic District	Chestnut Hill Historic District	June 12, 1987 (#87000940)	Roughly bounded by Highland Ave. and 31st St. 33°30′37″N 86°46′48″W	Red Mountain	
31	Claridge Manor Apartments	Claridge Manor Apartments	May 17, 1984 (#84000625)	1100 27th St., S. 33°30′15″N 86°47′09″W	Red Mountain	
32	Continental Gin Company	Continental Gin Company	November 20, 1980 (#80000691)	4500 5th Ave., S. 33°31′40″N 86°45′51″W	Woodlawn	
33	Country Club Historic District	Country Club Historic District	November 17, 2003 (#03001133)	Roughly bounded by Highland Ave, 33rd St., 34th St., Pawnee Ave., and 29th St. 33°30′27″N 86°46′43″W	Red Mountain	
34	Crittenden Building	Crittenden Building	December 30, 1981 (#81000126)	1914 3rd Ave., N. 33°30′58″N 86°48′29″W	Northside	
35	Cullom Street-Twelfth Street South Historic District	Cullom Street-Twelfth Street South Historic District	August 21, 1986 (#86001890)	Roughly bounded by 11th Ave., 12th St., S, Cullom St., and 13th St., S. 33°29′33″N 86°48′26″W	Southside	
36	Downtown Birmingham Historic District	Downtown Birmingham Historic District	February 11, 1982 (#82002039)	Roughly bounded by 3rd Ave., 24th St., 1st Ave., and 20th St.; also 312-322 21st St., N. and 1923 3rd Ave.; also roughly along 23rd St. and 3rd Ave., bounded by 5th Ave., 22nd St., and 2nd Ave.; also Portions of 1st, 2nd, 3rd, 4th, 5th, 20th, 22nd, 23rd, 24th & 25th Sts., N., Richard Arrington Jr. Blvd. 33°31′00″N 86°48′16″W	Northside	Second through fourth sets of boundaries represent boundary increases of February 21, 1985, February 20, 1998, and July 12, 2016 respectively
37	Downtown Birmingham Retail and Theatre Historic District	Downtown Birmingham Retail and Theatre Historic District	May 5, 1989 (#89000315)	Roughly bounded by 3rd Ave., N., 20th St., N., Morris Ave., and 17th St., N.; also 1914, 1917, 1919, and 1930 4th Ave., N. 33°30′51″N 86°48′30″W	Northside	Second set of boundaries represent a boundary increase of June 26, 1998
38	Downtown Ensley Historic District	Downtown Ensley Historic District	July 26, 2010 (#09000604)	17th-21st Sts. Ensley, and Avenues C-H; 33°30′53″N 86°53′50″W	Ensley	
39	Dr. Pepper Syrup Plant	Dr. Pepper Syrup Plant	September 6, 1990 (#90001317)	2829 2nd Ave., S. 33°30′59″N 86°47′27″W	Southside	
40	East End Baptist Church	East End Baptist Church	April 22, 2005 (#05000292)	2609 6th Ave., S. 33°30′45″N 86°47′33″W	Southside	
41	Empire Building	Empire Building	March 19, 1982 (#82002040)	1928 1st Ave., N. 33°30′53″N 86°48′22″W	Northside	
42	Enslen House	Enslen House	March 13, 1975 (#75000314)	2737 Highland Ave. 33°30′14″N 86°46′58″W	Red Mountain	Currently used as the Trimmier Law Firm.
43	Episcopal Church of the Advent	Episcopal Church of the Advent	March 30, 1983 (#83002972)	20th St. and 6th Ave., N. 33°31′09″N 86°48′30″W	Northside	
44	Exclusive Furniture Shop	Exclusive Furniture Shop	August 30, 1984 (#84000626)	704 29th St., S. 33°30′42″N 86°47′16″W	Southside	
45	Federal Reserve Bank of Atlanta-Birmingham Branch	Federal Reserve Bank of Atlanta-Birmingham Branch	April 18, 2003 (#03000230)	1801 5th Ave., N. 33°31′06″N 86°48′38″W	Northside	
46	Fire Station No. 3	Fire Station No. 3	October 25, 1990 (#90001554)	2210 Highland Ave. 33°30′03″N 86°47′26″W	Southside	
47	Fire Station No. 6	Fire Station No. 6	October 25, 1990 (#90001555)	317 15th St., N. 33°30′49″N 86°48′50″W	Northside	
48	Fire Station No. 10	Fire Station No. 10	October 25, 1990 (#90001556)	4120 2nd Ave., S. 33°31′30″N 86°46′26″W	Red Mountain	
49	Fire Station No. 11	Fire Station No. 11	October 25, 1990 (#90001557)	1250 13th St., N. 33°31′31″N 86°49′23″W	Northside	Building not existing anymore. Station was relocated to 4601 Bessemer Super Highway.
50	Fire Station No. 12	Fire Station No. 12	October 25, 1990 (#90001558)	15 57th St., S. 33°32′30″N 86°45′00″W	Woodlawn	Building still existing. Station was relocated to Woodlawn 6449 First Avenue North.
51	Fire Station No. 15	Fire Station No. 15	October 25, 1990 (#90001559)	1345 Steiner Ave., SW. 33°29′25″N 86°51′13″W	West End	Building still existing. Station was relocated to West End 1725 Jefferson Avenue.
52	Fire Station No. 16	Fire Station No. 16	October 25, 1990 (#90001560)	1621 Ave. G 33°30′50″N 86°53′34″W	Ensley	Building still existing. Station was relocated to Ensley 2001 Avenue I, Ensley.
53	Fire Station No. 19	Fire Station No. 19	October 25, 1990 (#90001561)	7713 Division Ave. 33°33′40″N 86°43′37″W	Roebuck-South East Lake	
54	Fire Station No. 22	Fire Station No. 22	October 25, 1990 (#90001562)	3114 Clairmont Ave. 33°30′44″N 86°46′59″W	Southside	
55	First Baptist Church, East Thomas	First Baptist Church, East Thomas	April 19, 2005 (#05000291)	419 11th Court, W. 33°31′20″N 86°50′36″W	Smithfield	
56	First Baptist Church, Kingston	First Baptist Church, Kingston	April 20, 2005 (#05000300)	4600 9th Ave., N. 33°32′24″N 86°46′06″W	East Birmingham	
57	First Christian Church Education Building		February 15, 1980 (#80000692)	2100 7th Ave., N. 33°31′17″N 86°48′29″W	Northside	Demolished, now a parking lot for the Jefferson County Courthouse
58	First Ebenezer Baptist Church	First Ebenezer Baptist Church	April 22, 2005 (#05000299)	420 Graymont Ave., N. 33°30′47″N 86°49′44″W	Smithfield	
59	First National-John A. Hand Building	First National-John A. Hand Building	September 29, 1983 (#83002976)	17 N. 20th St. 33°30′52″N 86°48′19″W	Northside	
60	First Presbyterian Church	First Presbyterian Church	December 28, 1982 (#82001604)	2100 4th Ave., N. 33°31′06″N 86°48′22″W	Northside	
61	First United Methodist Church	First United Methodist Church	December 27, 1982 (#82001605)	6th Ave. and 19th St., N. 33°31′06″N 86°48′38″W	Northside	
62	Five Points South Historic District	Five Points South Historic District	March 16, 1983 (#83002973)	Roughly bounded by 10th and 15th Aves. and 19th and 21st Sts.; also roughly bounded by 12th Ave., 19th St., 13th Ave., and 17th St.; also roughly bounded by 15th Ave., S., 20th St., S., 16th Ave., S. and 18th St.; also generally bounded by 10th Ave. S., 21st Pl. S., 15th Ave. S. & 17th St. S. 33°29′57″N 86°47′43″W	Southside	Second, third, and fourth sets of boundaries represent boundary increases of August 28, 1986, May 15, 1991, and November 18, 2019 respectively
63	Forest Park	Forest Park	November 21, 1980 (#80000693)	Roughly bounded by Highland Golf Course, 38th St. and Cherry St., Clairmont Ave., Linwood Rd., and Overlook Dr. 33°30′50″N 86°46′05″W	Red Mountain	
64	Fourth Avenue Historic District	Fourth Avenue Historic District	February 11, 1982 (#82002041)	1600-1800 blocks of 4th Ave., N. and part of the 300 blocks of 17th and 18th Sts., N. 33°30′55″N 86°48′40″W	Northside	
65	Fox Building		August 11, 1980 (#80000694)	19th St. and 4th Ave. 33°30′59″N 86°48′34″W	Northside	Demolished in 1981
66	A. G. Gaston Building	A. G. Gaston Building	September 11, 2000 (#00001028)	1527 5th Ave., N. 33°30′54″N 86°48′51″W	Northside	
67	Glen Iris Park Historic District	Glen Iris Park Historic District	August 30, 1984 (#84000628)	1-20 Glen Iris Park; 33°29′22″N 86°48′41″W	Southside	
68	Graymont School	Graymont School	August 16, 2007 (#07000838)	300 8th Ave., W. 33°31′00″N 86°50′31″W	Smithfield	
69	Hanover Court Apartments	Hanover Court Apartments	April 20, 1988 (#88000446)	2620 Highland Ave. 33°30′15″N 86°47′08″W	Red Mountain	
70	Hanover Place Historic District	Hanover Place Historic District	November 17, 2003 (#03001132)	Roughly bounded by Highland Ave., Hanover Cir., and U.S. Route 31; 33°30′22″N 86°47′12″W	Red Mountain	
71	Heaviest Corner on Earth	Heaviest Corner on Earth	July 11, 1985 (#85001502)	1st Ave., N. and 20th St., N. 33°30′52″N 86°48′20″W	Northside	
72	Highland Avenue Historic District	Highland Avenue Historic District	November 17, 1977 (#77000206)	2000 block through the 3200 block of 11th Court, S. 33°30′18″N 86°46′59″W	Red Mountain	
73	Highland Plaza Apartments	Highland Plaza Apartments	May 17, 1984 (#84000630)	2250 Highland Ave., S 33°30′10″N 86°47′23″W	Southside	
74	Hotel Redmont	Hotel Redmont	January 27, 1983 (#83002974)	2101 5th Ave., N. 33°31′07″N 86°48′23″W	Northside	
75	Howard College Estates Historic District	Howard College Estates Historic District	April 22, 1999 (#99000467)	Roughly along 77th Way, 77th Place, Vanderbilt St., 8th Court, 8th, Rugby, and Belmont Aves. 33°33′21″N 86°42′58″W	Roebuck-South East Lake	
76	Ideal Department Store Building	Ideal Department Store Building	May 2, 1985 (#85000918)	111 19th St., N. 33°30′52″N 86°48′26″W	Northside	
77	Jefferson County Courthouse	Jefferson County Courthouse	December 27, 1982 (#82001606)	716 21st St., N. 33°31′16″N 86°48′32″W	Northside	
78	A. D. King House	A. D. King House	May 15, 2008 (#08000428)	721 12th St. Ensley; 33°31′04″N 86°53′21″W	Ensley	Civil Rights Movement in Birmingham, Alabama 1933-1979 MPS
79	S. H. Kress and Company Building	S. H. Kress and Company Building	January 4, 1982 (#82002042)	3rd Ave. and 19th St. 33°30′57″N 86°48′29″W	Northside	
80	Lakeview School	Lakeview School	November 17, 1977 (#77000207)	2800 Clairmont Ave. 33°30′34″N 86°47′11″W	Red Mountain	
81	Lakewood Historic District		June 22, 2000 (#00000710)	Roughly bounded by Lee Ave., 82nd St., Spring St., and 80th St. 33°33′38″N 86°42′44″W	Crestwood	
82	Liberty National Life Insurance Company Building	Liberty National Life Insurance Company Building	June 11, 2025 (#100011929)	2001 3rd Avenue South; 33°30′37″N 86°48′08″W	Southside	
83	Joseph Loveman & Loeb Department Store	Joseph Loveman & Loeb Department Store	April 14, 1983 (#83002971)	214-224 19th St., N. 33°30′54″N 86°48′30″W	Northside	
84	Magnolia Avenue South Historic District		August 9, 2018 (#100002766)	Magnolia Ave. bounded by Richard Arrington, Jr. Blvd. & 24th St. S 33°30′12″N 86°47′40″W	Southside	
85	Manchester Terrace	Manchester Terrace	March 22, 1989 (#89000163)	720-728 S. 29th St. 33°30′43″N 86°47′17″W	Southside	
86	McAdory Building	McAdory Building	November 14, 1979 (#79000388)	2013 1st Ave., N 33°30′52″N 86°48′18″W	Northside	
87	Milner Heights Historic District	Milner Heights Historic District	November 17, 2003 (#03001130)	Roughly bounded by 28th St., Highland Ave., 27th Ave., Arlington Ave., and 23rd St. 33°30′08″N 86°47′10″W	Red Mountain	
88	Morris Avenue Historic District	Morris Avenue Historic District	April 24, 1973 (#73000349)	2000-2400 blocks of Morris Ave. 33°30′53″N 86°48′06″W	Northside	
89	Morris Avenue - First Avenue North Historic District	Morris Avenue - First Avenue North Historic District	January 9, 1986 (#86000009)	2000-2400 blocks of Morris Ave. and 2100-2500 blocks of 1st Ave., N. 33°30′58″N 86°48′05″W	Northside	
90	Mount Ararat Baptist Church		April 19, 2005 (#05000307)	1920 Slayden Ave. 33°31′06″N 86°54′29″W	Ensley	
91	Morrow and Sinnige Nabers Building	Morrow and Sinnige Nabers Building	September 22, 1980 (#80000695)	109 20th St., N. 33°30′54″N 86°48′20″W	Northside	
92	New Pilgrim Baptist Church	New Pilgrim Baptist Church	August 24, 2007 (#05000306)	903 6th Ave., S. 33°30′04″N 86°48′55″W	Southside	
93	New Rising Star Baptist Church	New Rising Star Baptist Church	April 19, 2005 (#05000305)	3104 33rd Place N., Collegeville; 33°33′16″N 86°47′59″W	North Birmingham	
94	North Lakeview Industrial District		June 28, 2016 (#16000399)	2801-3211 2nd and 2810-3130 3rd Aves., S., and 216-231 29th, 130 30th, 230 31st, and 205 32nd Sts., S. 33°31′00″N 86°47′19″W	Southside	
95	Norwood Historic District	Norwood Historic District	October 29, 2001 (#01001166)	2800-3624 Norwood Boulevard; also generally bounded by Carraway Blvd., 19th Ave. North, Norwood Blvd., 17th Ave. North, Vanderbilt Rd., and I 20/59; 33°32′22″N 86°48′04″W	Northside	Boundary increase and renaming (from "Norwood Boulevard Historic District") approved December 3, 2021.
96	Oak Hill Cemetery	Oak Hill Cemetery	July 13, 1977 (#77000208)	1120 N. 19th St. 33°31′32″N 86°49′00″W	Northside	
97	Orlando Apartments	Orlando Apartments	May 15, 1990 (#90000309)	2301 15th Ave., S. 33°29′50″N 86°47′17″W	Red Mountain	
98	Peace Baptist Church		April 22, 2005 (#05000293)	302 6th St., N. 33°30′25″N 86°49′37″W	Smithfield	Adjacent J. H. Stenson Fellowship Hall has been demolished.
99	Phelan Park Historic District	Phelan Park Historic District	January 26, 1989 (#88003241)	Roughly bounded by 13th Ave., S., 14th St., S., 16th Ave., S., and 13th Pl., S. 33°29′36″N 86°48′09″W	Southside	
100	Powell Avenue Steam Plant	Powell Avenue Steam Plant	December 10, 2014 (#14001002)	1800 Powell Ave., S. 33°30′41″N 86°48′25″W	Southside	
101	Powell School	Powell School	June 17, 1976 (#76000331)	2331 6th Ave., N. 33°31′16″N 86°48′13″W	Northside	
102	Pratt City Carline Historic District		March 2, 1989 (#89000118)	Ave. U from Ave. A to Carline and Carline from Ave. W to 6th St. 33°31′57″N 86°53′01″W	Pratt	
103	Pratt School	Pratt School	January 28, 1994 (#93001591)	306 Ave. U 33°31′58″N 86°52′54″W	Pratt	
104	Quinlan Castle	Quinlan Castle	September 13, 1984 (#84000632)	2030 9th Ave., S. 33°30′13″N 86°47′48″W	Southside	Demolished 2022
105	Ramsay-McCormack Building		January 30, 2009 (#08001273)	1823-1825 Ave. E 33°30′50″N 86°53′47″W	Ensley	
106	Red Mountain Suburbs Historic District	Red Mountain Suburbs Historic District	October 3, 1985 (#85002719)	Roughly bounded by Crest and Argyle and Altamont, Country Club, Salisbury, and Lanark Rds. 33°30′04″N 86°46′30″W	Red Mountain	Extends into Mountain Brook, elsewhere in Jefferson County
107	William Reed House		October 1, 1987 (#87001778)	888 Twin Lake Dr. 33°37′04″N 86°40′31″W	Huffman	
108	Rhodes Park	Rhodes Park	April 15, 1982 (#82002043)	Roughly bounded by S. 10th, S. 13th, and Highland Aves. and S. 28th and S. 30th Sts. 33°30′22″N 86°46′42″W	Red Mountain	
109	Rickwood Field	Rickwood Field	February 1, 1993 (#92001826)	1137 2nd Ave., W. 33°30′08″N 86°51′21″W	West End	
110	Ridgely Apartments	Ridgely Apartments	May 17, 1984 (#84000634)	608 21st St., N. 33°31′11″N 86°48′28″W	Northside	
111	Roebuck Springs Historic District		February 12, 1999 (#99000149)	Roughly off of Blountsville County Road; 33°34′38″N 86°42′16″W	Roebuck-South East Lake	
112	Saint Andrew's Episcopal Church	Saint Andrew's Episcopal Church	August 28, 1986 (#86001959)	1164 11th Ave., S. 33°29′44″N 86°48′28″W	Southside	
113	St. Luke AME Church	St. Luke AME Church	April 22, 2005 (#05000296)	2803 21st Ave., N. 33°32′33″N 86°48′36″W	Northside	
114	St. Luke AME Zion Church	St. Luke AME Zion Church	April 22, 2005 (#05000295)	3937 12th Ave., N. 33°32′34″N 86°46′51″W	East Birmingham	
115	St. Paul's Catholic Church	St. Paul's Catholic Church	December 27, 1982 (#82001607)	2120 3rd Ave., N. 33°31′04″N 86°48′18″W	Northside	
116	Sardis Baptist Church	Sardis Baptist Church	April 20, 2005 (#05000298)	1240 4th St., N. 33°31′28″N 86°49′50″W	Smithfield	
117	Seaboard Air Line Railway Freight Depot		December 19, 2023 (#100009643)	30 Twentieth St. S 33°30′43″N 86°48′15″W	Southside	
118	Second Presbyterian Church	Second Presbyterian Church	September 11, 1986 (#86002616)	10th Ave. and 12th St., S. 33°29′48″N 86°48′31″W	Southside	
119	Shady Grove Baptist Church	Shady Grove Baptist Church	April 20, 2005 (#05000297)	3444 31st Way, N., Collegeville; 33°33′35″N 86°48′15″W	North Birmingham	
120	Sixteenth Street Baptist Church	Sixteenth Street Baptist Church	September 17, 1980 (#80000696)	1530 6th Ave., N. at 16th St. 33°31′00″N 86°48′53″W	Northside	
121	Sloss Blast Furnace Site	Sloss Blast Furnace Site	June 22, 1972 (#72000162)	1st Ave. at 32nd St. 33°31′14″N 86°47′34″W	Northside	
122	Slossfield Community Center	Slossfield Community Center	May 29, 2008 (#08000457)	1901 25th Ct., N. 33°32′38″N 86°49′34″W	North Birmingham	
123	Joseph Riley Smith Historic District		October 10, 1985 (#85002898)	300-400 blocks of 10th Ave., 100-400 blocks of 9th Ct., 944 4th St., W., and 948 3rd St., W. 33°31′02″N 86°50′26″W	Smithfield	
124	Smithfield Historic District		October 15, 1985 (#85002899)	Roughly bounded by 8th Ave., N., 6th St., N., 4th Terrace, N., and 1st St., N.; also roughly along 4th Ct. and Center St. 33°30′41″N 86°49′52″W	Smithfield	Second set of boundaries represent a boundary increase of August 14, 1998
125	South Central Bell Building	South Central Bell Building	October 16, 2020 (#100004626)	600 19th St. North; 33°31′06″N 86°48′42″W	Northside	
126	South East Lake Historic District		July 3, 1997 (#97000652)	Roughly bounded by 78th and 8th Sts., and Division, 1st, 2nd, and 5th Aves. 33°33′56″N 86°43′14″W	Roebuck-South East Lake	
127	South Highlands of East Lake Historic District		November 17, 2003 (#03001136)	Roughly bounded by 8th Ave., 85th St., 5th Ave., and 78th St. 33°35′37″N 86°42′51″W	Roebuck-South East Lake	
128	Southside Historic District		July 6, 2005 (#05000647)	2800 University Boulevard, parts of 4th-7th Aves., S., and 22nd-32nd Sts., S. 33°30′46″N 86°47′26″W	Southside	
129	Steiner Bank Building	Steiner Bank Building	June 25, 1974 (#74000414)	2101 1st Ave., N. 33°30′53″N 86°48′14″W	Northside	
130	Thomas By-Product Coke Works Historic District	Thomas By-Product Coke Works Historic District	September 13, 1995 (#95001060)	Roughly bounded by railroad tracks and the sand and gravel quarry 33°31′33″N 86°51′36″W	Pratt	
131	Thomas Historic District	Thomas Historic District	March 2, 1989 (#89000119)	Roughly the area between 1st and 8th Sts., north of Village Creek and west of the St. Louis and San Francisco railroad tracks 33°31′44″N 86°51′37″W	Pratt	
132	U.S. Post Office	U.S. Post Office	June 3, 1976 (#76000332)	1800 5th Ave., N. 33°31′02″N 86°48′38″W	Northside	
133	Vulcan	Vulcan	July 6, 1976 (#76000333)	Vulcan Park, U.S. Route 31, S. 33°29′30″N 86°47′44″W	Southside	
134	Waters Building	Waters Building	March 11, 1980 (#80000697)	209-211 22nd St., N. 33°31′01″N 86°48′12″W	Northside	
135	Watts Building	Watts Building	September 17, 1979 (#79000389)	2008 3rd Ave., N. 33°31′00″N 86°48′25″W	Northside	
136	West End Hills Missionary Baptist Church	West End Hills Missionary Baptist Church	April 20, 2005 (#05000303)	1680 19th Place, SW. 33°28′06″N 86°52′11″W	Southwest	
137	West End Masonic Temple		August 27, 1987 (#87001417)	1346 Tuscaloosa Ave. 33°29′34″N 86°51′18″W	West End	Destroyed by fire in 1996.
138	West Park	West Park	May 24, 1984 (#84000636)	5th Ave., N. and 16th St. 33°30′59″N 86°48′48″W	Northside	
139	Whilldin Building	Whilldin Building	March 25, 1982 (#82002044)	513-517 21st St., N. 33°31′09″N 86°48′25″W	Northside	
140	Wimberly-Thomas Warehouse	Wimberly-Thomas Warehouse	October 3, 1985 (#85002718)	1809 1st Ave., S. 33°30′38″N 86°48′21″W	Southside	
141	Windham Construction Office Building		August 9, 1984 (#84000638)	528 8th Ave., N. 33°30′51″N 86°49′37″W	Smithfield	
142	Woodlawn City Hall	Woodlawn City Hall	June 30, 1988 (#88000990)	5525 1st Ave., N. 33°32′20″N 86°45′11″W	Woodlawn	Beaux Arts-style combination city hall, fire department, library of short-lived city of Woodlawn, Alabama.
143	Woodlawn Commercial Historic District		January 25, 1991 (#90002179)	Area around the junction of 1st Ave., N. and 55th Pl. 33°32′24″N 86°45′09″W	Woodlawn	Includes Woodlawn City Hall and 11 other contributing buildings
144	Woodlawn Highlands Historic District		May 31, 2006 (#06000438)	Bounded by 5th Ave., S., Crestwood Boulevard, and 56th and 61st Sts., S. 33°32′13″N 86°45′02″W	Crestwood	
145	Woodlawn Historic District	Woodlawn Historic District	November 17, 2003 (#03001129)	Roughly bounded by 1st Ave., N., 47th St., N., 61st St., N., and Interstates 20/59; 33°32′25″N 86°45′27″W	Woodlawn	Woodlawn neighborhood, a community that was formerly a city, then absorbed into Birmingham. 608 contributing buildings, including all of Woodlawn Commercial Historic District
146	Woodward Building	Woodward Building	June 30, 1983 (#83002977)	1927 1st Ave., N. 33°30′51″N 86°48′21″W	Northside	
147	Wylam Fire Station		October 25, 1990 (#90001563)	Northwestern corner of the junction of 8th Ave. and Huron St. 33°30′18″N 86°55′16″W	Ensley	
148	Peter Zinszer's Mammoth Furniture House	Peter Zinszer's Mammoth Furniture House	September 23, 1980 (#80000698)	2115, 2117, and 2119 2nd Ave., N. 33°30′58″N 86°48′15″W	Northside	

== See also ==
- List of National Historic Landmarks in Alabama
- National Register of Historic Places listings in Alabama
