= Historic fire stations of Birmingham, Alabama =

- Historic Fire Stations of Birmingham MPS
- U.S. National Register of Historic Places
- Location: Birmingham, Alabama
- NRHP reference No.: 64500006
- Added to NRHP: October 25, 1990

The city of Birmingham, Alabama, saw a vast period of growth in the late 19th and early 20th centuries. With its growth came an expansion in city services, notably the fire department. A number of new stations were constructed from 1910 through 1929, many of which are still standing. Together, ten of these historic fire stations are listed on the National Register of Historic Places as part of the Historic Fire Stations of Birmingham Multiple Property Submission.

== History ==
Birmingham's first volunteer fire station was established in December 1871, shortly after the city was incorporated. The city purchased its first fire engine in 1873 after a large fire affected the city. The modern fire department was founded in 1885 with two stations. It had grown to employ 21 firemen and 15 horses by 1890. During the early 20th century, although Birmingham spent less money per capita on services than similarly-sized Southern cities, it spent more on fire and education. The insistence on first-class fire protection came from downtown business leaders; better fire coverage kept their insurance rates low. In 1910 Birmingham annexed a number of suburban towns, more than doubling the city's population. Soon after, residents in the suburbs began to demand better fire protection, leading to many new stations being constructed; by 1929 there were 24 fire stations in Birmingham.

== Architecture ==
Stations built before 1920 tended to be in the central business districts of the suburban towns, and their architecture reflected the commercial styles of their surroundings, with little decoration. Similarly, stations built after 1920 were primarily in residential areas, and were built in styles popular at the time, including Spanish Revival, Tudor Revival, and Beaux-Arts.

Property	Photo	Built	Location	Description
Fire Station No. 3		1927	2210 Highland Ave. 33°30′08″N 86°47′25″W	Station No. 3 was built in 1927 in the suburban Highland Park area. In an effort to blend in with its more affluent surroundings, it is designed in a Beaux-Arts style, and more ornamented than most of its counterparts. The façade is dominated by three garage doors, each topped with a decorated arch and complemented by three six-over-six windows on the second floor. The entrance door to the left of the garage doors is surrounded by a decorated arch and topped with a cartouche. It still functions as an active firehouse.
Fire Station No. 6		1906	317 15th St., N. 33°30′46″N 86°48′48″W	Station No. 6 is the oldest remaining fire station in Birmingham. Built in 1906 to serve Jewish and African-American neighborhoods at the edge of downtown, its utilitarian style matched the buildings in its area. Originally the building had two arched garage doors, but one has been bricked over. A simple entrance door lies between the two bays and a large "No 6" is painted above it. Stone sills underline the windows, a set of three above each garage door with a smaller window between them on the façade, and two pairs on each floor on the west side of the building. It has been used to house the Firehouse Shelter, a homeless shelter, since 1983.
Fire Station No. 10		1927	4120 2nd Ave., S. 33°31′30″N 86°46′27″W	Typical of suburban firehouses, Station No. 10 in the Avondale neighborhood is built in a style reflective of its surroundings. Unlike the urban stations, No 10 is a one-story, Spanish Revival building, built in 1927. The two garage door bays anchor the left of the main façade, with an entrance and gable roofed meeting room to the right. The living area lies to the rear. Though it has been thoroughly modernized — it was an active station until 2009 — with aluminum windows and rollup doors and a stucco exterior, the station retains its original character.
Fire Station No. 11		1910	1250 13th St., N. 33°31′30″N 86°49′24″W	A former fire station built in 1910 in the working-class Fountain Heights neighborhood, Station No. 11 was built in a commercial style, in contrast to later suburban stations. The garage door, later partially covered with brick, sat on the left side of the building next to a central entrance door. A brick belt over the office portion of the building and an awning over the doors are the only decorative elements on the building. Its replacement, the current Fire Station No. 11, is at 4601 Bessemer Super Highway.
Fire Station No. 12		1927	15 57th St., S. 33°32′30″N 86°45′0″W	The former Station No. 12 in Woodlawn is a Tudor Revival structure built of stone. An L-shaped building, the two-story residential portion meets the one-story, double gable-roofed garage at a conical tower. The tower contains a spiral staircase with two-over-two-over-two windows along it, giving an offset appearance from the outside. The garage opens to an alley rather than directly onto the main street. The station was renovated and now houses the Birmingham Dream Center, a church outreach ministry. The current Fire Station No. 12 is at Woodlawn 6449 First Avenue North.
Fire Station No. 15		1929	1345 Steiner Ave., SW. 33°29′25″N 86°51′12″W	The former Station No. 15 is an urban commercial-styled building in a residential portion of the Arlington neighborhood. The garage door is flanked by two entrances, one false door leading to the side of the building. Above the garage door sits a false balcony below a large second-floor window. The west side of the building has a false arched entrance and features vents along the parapet roof line. The current Fire Station No. 15 is at West End 1725 Jefferson Avenue.
Fire Station No. 16		1926	1621 Ave. G 33°30′52″N 86°53′34″W	The former Station No. 16 in Ensley is an example of a mixed-use station in a suburban area. The station, which incorporates Spanish Revival elements, also served as the community's police station and jail. Two one-story wings on the street corner comprised the fire station, with a courtyard between the two. The garage wing features a terra cotta shed roof, and the office wing has three arched entrances on the façade. The two-story police station and jail has a parapet roof topped with terra cotta tiles and a stucco band. Six-over-six double-hung windows adorn both floors. The current Fire Station No. 16 is at 2001 Avenue I, Ensley.
Fire Station No. 19		1925	7713 Division Ave. 33°33′40″N 86°43′37″W	Station No. 19 was erected in 1925 after a fire in the community. The Romanesque Revival building is constructed of light brown brick and stone. The two-story living and office area lies behind the single-story garage area. The garage doors are recessed and surrounded by stone brackets. Quoins adorn the corners of the building. A public library, which had begun in and older fire station in 1914, was built next to the station in 1926. The station is still an active fire station.
Fire Station No. 22		1927	3114 Clairmont Ave. 33°30′44″N 86°46′59″W	Station No. 22 was built in 1927 on the eastern edge of the Highland Park neighborhood. The main feature of the Spanish Revival building is a two-story tower square tower facing the intersection of Clairmont Avenue and 32nd Street. The building has been extensively modified; the original stucco has been resurfaced, the tile roof was replaced with asphalt shingles, and the garage door has been replaced with a large window. A new station, combining No. 10 with No. 22, was opened in 2009, and the old No. 22 was converted to a restaurant and hair salon in 2011.
Wylam Fire Station		1910	NE Corner 8th Ave. and Huron St. 33°30′17″N 86°55′17″W	In contrast to many of the other historic stations, the Wylam Fire Station is built in a restrained commercial style of dark red brick. Built in 1910, when the town of Wylam was annexed into Birmingham, the station features large, wooden double garage doors with decorative metal hinges. Three six-over-six wood-frame windows sit over the door, with a stone panel above. The east and west sides of the building feature six windows on each floor, steel frame on the first and wood on the second.

== See also ==
- National Register of Historic Places listings in Birmingham, Alabama
- National Register of Historic Places Multiple Property Submissions in Alabama
