= Bradshaw House =

Bradshaw House may refer to:

in the United States (by state then city)

- Bradshaw House (Birmingham, Alabama), NRHP-listed in Birmingham, Alabama
- Matthews-Bradshaw House, North Little Rock, Arkansas, NRHP-listed in Pulaski County
- Bradshaw-Duncan House, Crestwood, Kentucky, NRHP-listed in Oldham County
- Bradshaw House (Hopkinsville, Kentucky), NRHP-listed in Christian County
- Bradshaw-Booth House, Enterprise, Mississippi, NRHP-listed in Clarke County
- Parker-Bradshaw House, Lufkin, Texas, NRHP-listed in Angelina County
- George Albert Bradshaw House, Beaver, Utah, NRHP-listed in Beaver County
- Bradshaw House-Hotel, Hurricane, Utah, NRHP-listed in Washington County
- George Bradshaw House and Joshua Salisbury/George Bradshaw Barn, Wellsville, Utah, NRHP-listed in Cache County
