= List of neighborhoods in Birmingham, Alabama =

For purposes of community development and citizen participation, the City of Birmingham's nine Council districts are divided into a total of 23 communities, and again into a total of 99 individual neighborhoods with their own neighborhood associations. Communities do not necessarily follow Council District boundaries. This structure was created in 1974 as part of a formal "Citizen Participation Program" designed to improve communication between residents and city leaders. Neighborhood associations are routinely consulted on matters related to zoning changes, liquor licenses, economic development, and city services. Neighborhoods are also granted discretionary funds from the city's budget to use for capital improvements and for non-capital projects and events. Each neighborhood's officers meet with their peers to form Community Advisory Committees which are granted broader powers over city departments. The presidents of these committees, in turn, form the Citizen's Advisory Board, which meets regularly with the mayor, council, and department heads.

- Airport Hills (Airport Highlands, Brownsville Heights, Brummitt Heights, Maple Grove, Penfield Park)
- Brownville (East Brownville, Roosevelt, West Brownville)
- Cahaba (Highway 280, Lake Purdy, Overton)
- Crestline (Crestline, Eastwood)
- Crestwood (Crestwood North, Crestwood South)
- East Birmingham (East Birmingham, Inglenook, Kingston, North Avondale)
- East Lake (Brown Springs, East Lake, Gate City, North East Lake, Wahouma, Zion City)
- East Pinson Valley (Apple Valley, Bridlewood, Echo Highlands, Pine Knoll Vista, Sun Valley)
- Ensley (Dolomite, West Ensley, Oak Ridge, Sherman Heights, Tuxedo, Wylam)
- Five Points West (Belview Heights, Bush Hills, Central Park, Ensley Highlands, Fairview, Green Acres)
- Grasselli (Grasselli Heights, Hillman, Hillman Park, Industrial Center, Tarpley City, West Goldwire)
- Huffman (Huffman, Killough Springs, Liberty Highlands, Spring Lake)
- North Birmingham (Acipco-Finley, Collegeville, Fairmont, Harriman Park, Hooper City, North Birmingham)
- Northside (Central City, Druid Hills, Evergreen, Fountain Heights, Norwood)
- Pratt City (Central Pratt, North Pratt, Sandusky, Smithfield Estates, South Pratt, Thomas)
- Red Mountain (Forest Park-South Avondale, Highland Park, Redmont Park)
- Roebuck/South East Lake (Roebuck, Roebuck Springs-South Roebuck, South East Lake)
- Smithfield (College Hills, East Thomas, Enon Ridge, Graymont, Smithfield)
- Southside (Five Points South, Glen Iris, Southside)
- Southwest (Garden Highlands, Jones Valley, Mason City, Powderly, Riley-Travellick, Sand Ridge)
- Titusville (North Titusville, South Titusville, Woodland Park)
- West End (Arlington-West End, Germania Park, Oakwood Place, Rising-West Princeton, West End Manor)
- Woodlawn (East Avondale, Oak Ridge Park, South Woodlawn, Woodlawn)
