= Ideal Department Store Building =

Ideal Department Store Building may refer to:

in the United States

- Ideal Department Store Building (Birmingham, Alabama), listed on the National Register of Historic Places (NRHP) in Birmingham, Alabama
- Ideal Department Store Building (Massillon, Ohio), NRHP-listed in Stark County

== See also ==
- Ideal Building, Denver, Colorado, listed on the NRHP in downtown Denver
