= Dyer Talley =

American surgeon

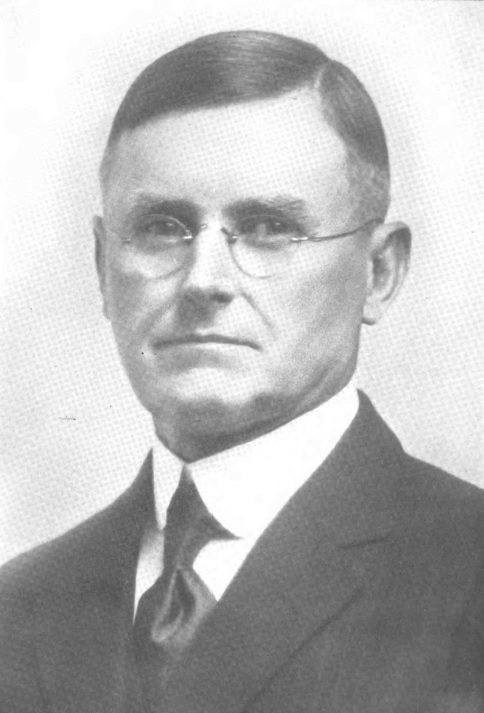
- Born: December 5, 1865; Birmingham, Alabama, United States
- Occupation: Surgeon

Dyer Findley Talley (December 5, 1865—?) was an American surgeon who served as president of the Medical Association of the State of Alabama.

Talley was born in Woodlawn, Birmingham, Alabama, on December 5, 1865, to Nicholas Davis Talley and Mary Matilda (Hawkins) Talley. After attending the public schools he earned an A.B. from the University of Alabama in 1887 and received the honorary A.M. degree from the same institution in 1892. He graduated from the medical department of Tulane University in 1892. He did post-graduate work in London in 1899.

He began practicing his profession in Birmingham since 1892, forming a partnership in 1898 with Dr. G. C. Chapman that lasted until 1901. In 1902, he built an infirmary called Talley's Private Infirmary with Dr. W. P. MrAdory.

Talley served as president of the Medical Association of the State of Alabama. He served on the State Board of Medical Examiners and State Board of Censors for 15 years, resigning from these places when he was elected president of the State Association. He also served as a member of the Board of Health of Jefferson County, the Jefferson County Medical Society, the Southern Medical Society, the Southern Surgical Association, the American Medical Association, and the American College of Surgeons.

He married Elizabeth Fitzhugh Byrd on October 17, 1917.
