= Second Presbyterian Church (Birmingham, Alabama) =

Historic church in Alabama, United States

- U.S. National Register of Historic Places
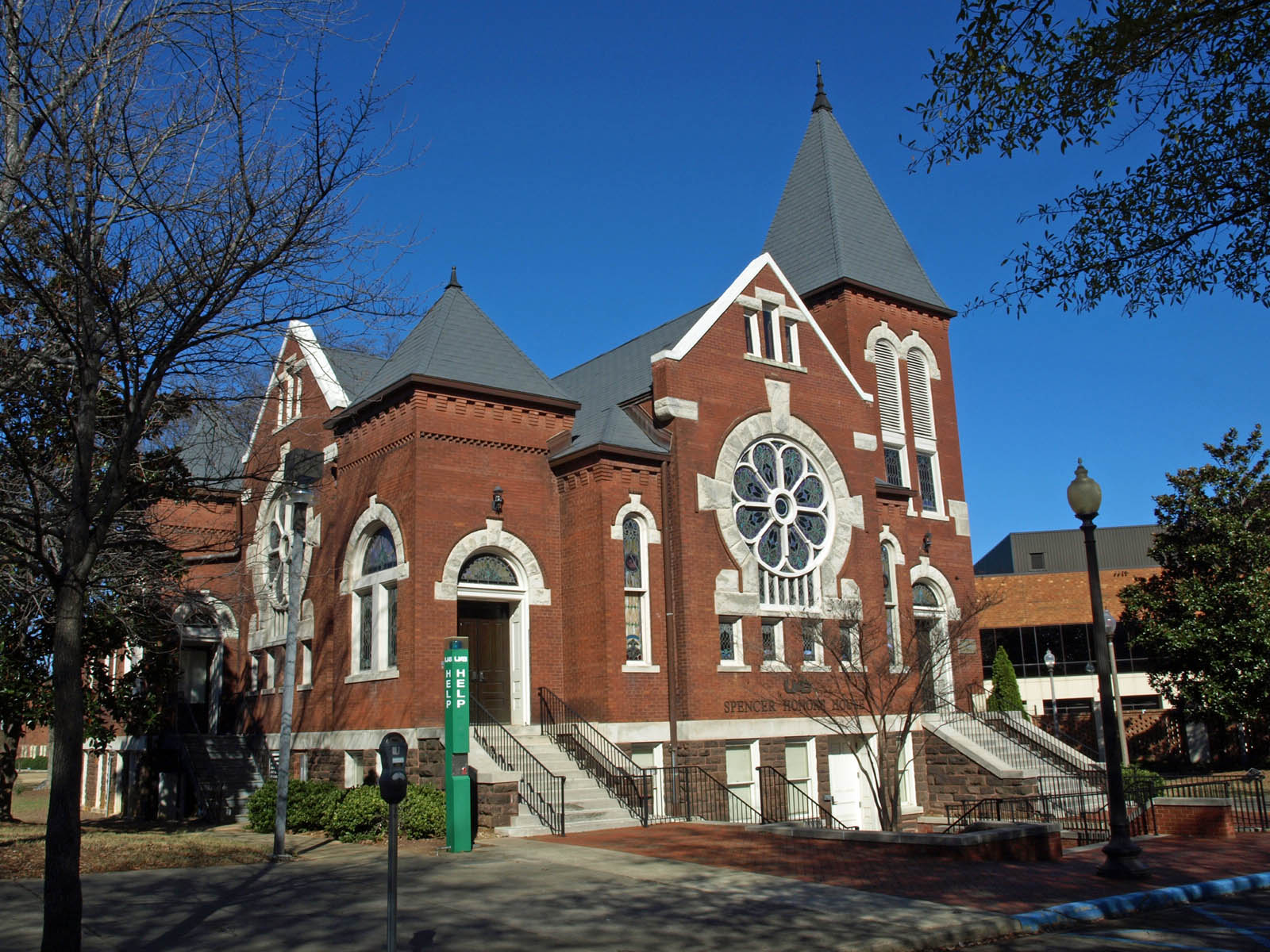

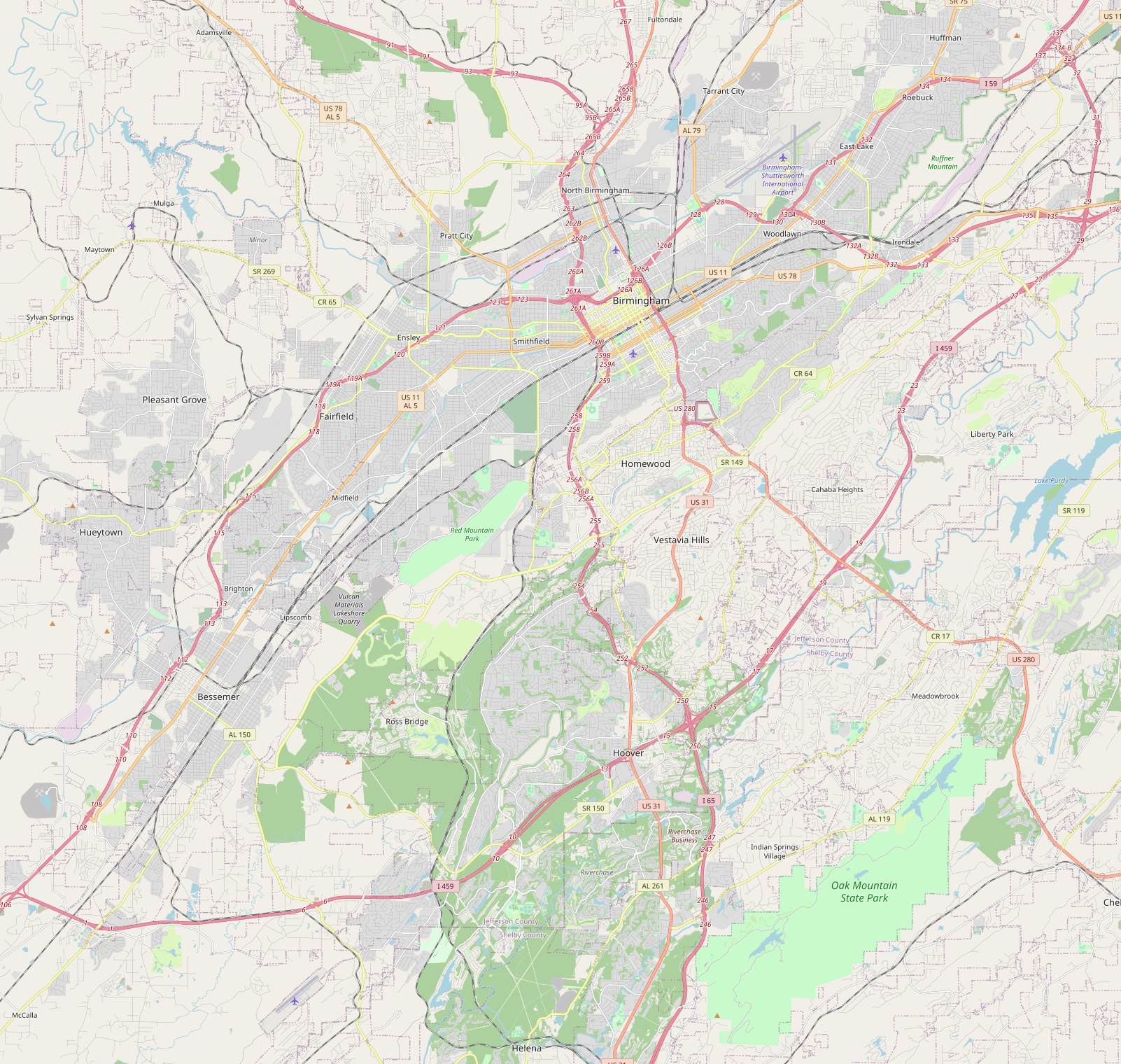
- Location within Birmingham, Alabama Location within Alabama Location within the United States
- Location: Tenth Ave. and Twelfth St. S, Birmingham, Alabama
- Coordinates: 33°29′48″N 86°48′31″W
- Area: less than one acre
- Built: 1901
- Architect: D.A. Helmich
- Architectural style: Romanesque
- NRHP reference No.: 86002616
- Added to NRHP: September 11, 1986

Second Presbyterian Church is a historic church building at Tenth Avenue and Twelfth Street South in Birmingham, Alabama. It was built in 1901 and added to the National Register of Historic Places in 1986. It is now used as the University of Alabama at Birmingham honors house.
