= Blessed Sacrament Catholic Church (Birmingham, Alabama) =

Historic church in Alabama, United States

- U.S. National Register of Historic Places
- Alabama Register of Landmarks and Heritage
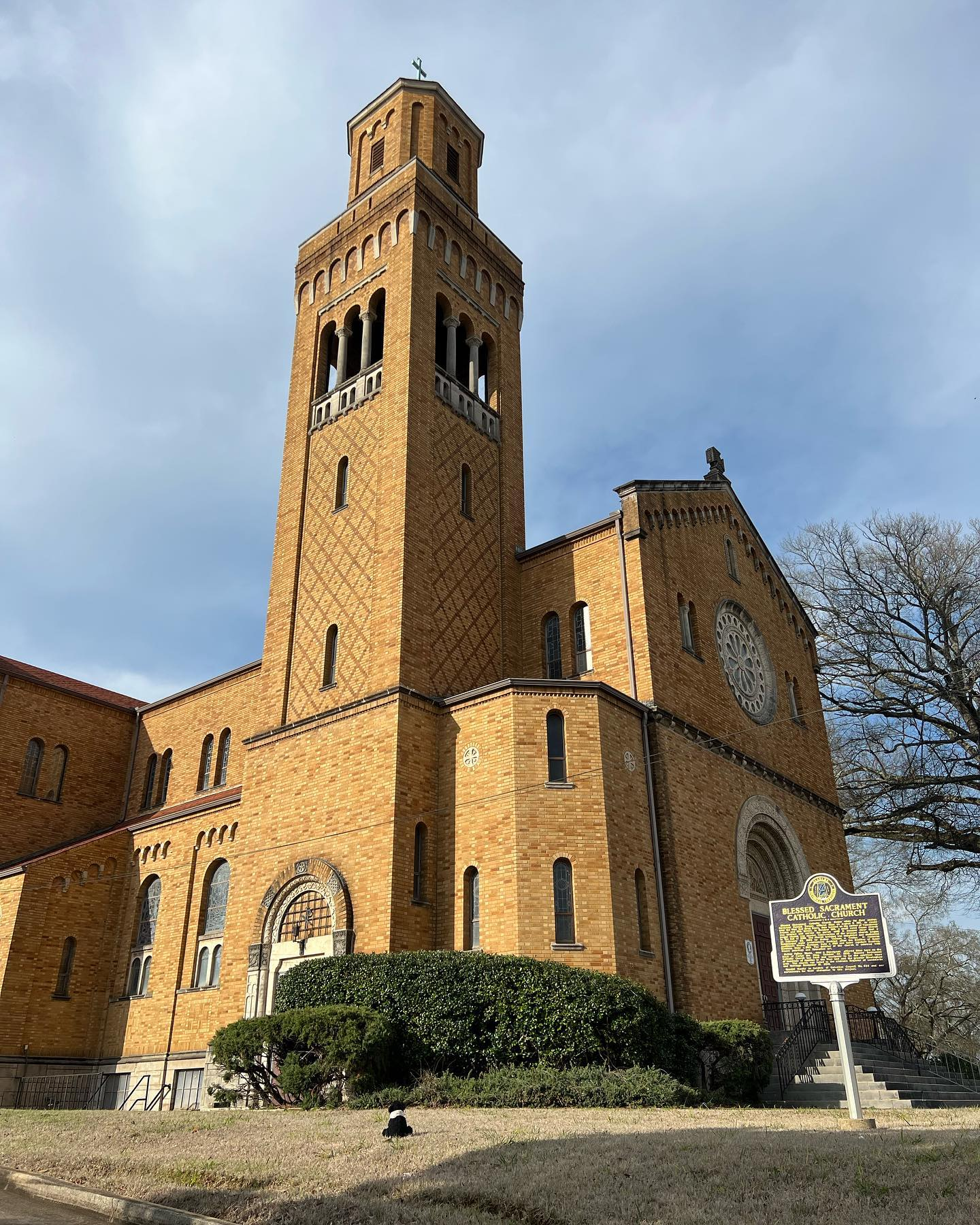

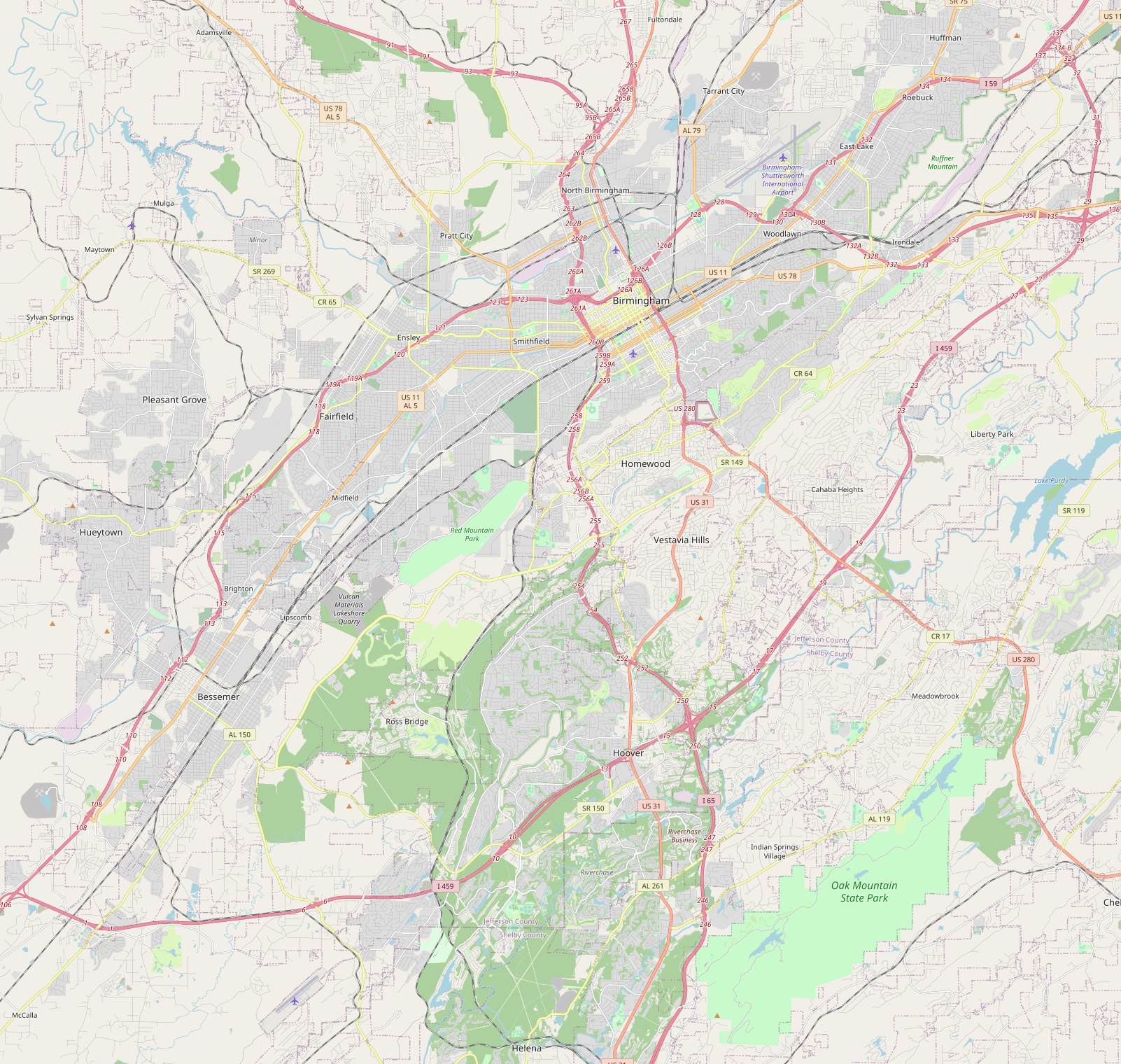
- Location within Birmingham, Alabama Location within Alabama Location within the United States
- Location: 1460 Pearson Ave. SW, Birmingham, Alabama
- Coordinates: 33°29′20″N 86°51′20″W
- Built: 1930
- Architect: John J. Carey, Paul Dowling
- Architectural style: Romanesque Revival
- NRHP reference No.: 15000430

Significant dates
- Added to NRHP: July 21, 2015
- Designated ARLH: December 16, 2010

Blessed Sacrament Catholic Church is a historic church located at 1460 Pearson Avenue SW in Birmingham, Alabama. The parish was established in 1911 and the church completed in 1930. The interior decoration of the building was not completed until 1959. It was added to the National Register of Historic Places in 2015.

Its liturgical life is distinctive locally for offering Latin Mass (Extraordinary Form) every Sunday. The church has also been used for important liturgies of the Catholic Diocese of Birmingham in Alabama such as a "Blue Mass" honoring police officers.
