= Graymont School =

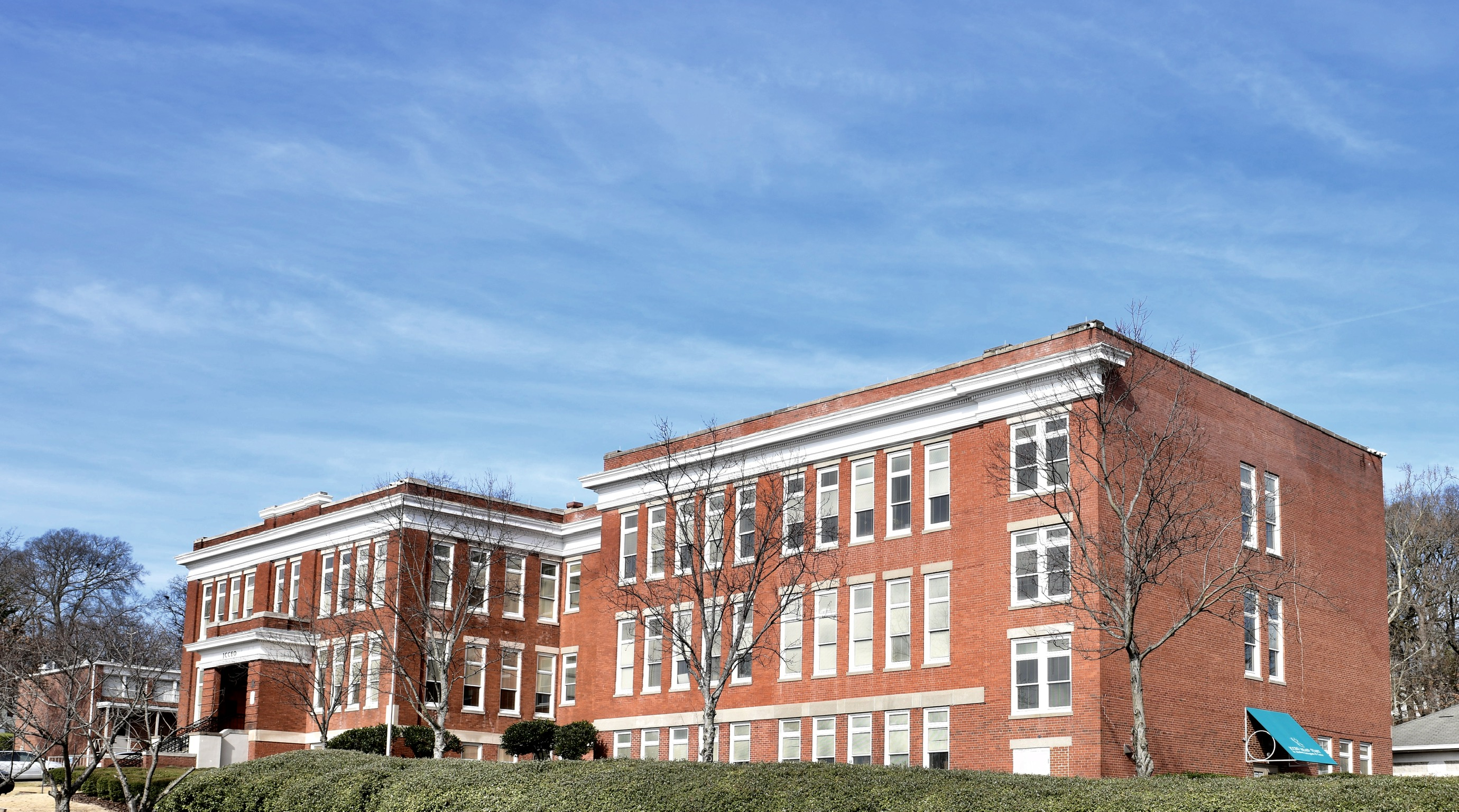
- Graymont School

Location
- Graymont; United States; 33.515°N 86.842°W

Information
- Type: Elementary school
- Established: 1908
- Closed: 1989
- School board: Birmingham City Schools

U.S. National Register of Historic Places
- Designated: August 16, 2007

Graymont Elementary School was first opened in 1908 as a part of the then independent town of Graymont, in Jefferson County, Alabama. It taught elementary students from the local community for 81 years. Graymont Elementary was the first school in the Birmingham system to be integrated.

It was constructed in a classical style by William Spink. It later became part of the Birmingham City Schools system. Located at 300 8th Avenue West in what is now the Smithfield neighborhood, it was closed in 1989, after it was determined that the school was redundant to Hill Elementary School nearby.

In the mid 1990s, the vacant former school was restored and adapted for the offices of the Jefferson County Committee for Economic Opportunity (JCCEO), which operates federally-funded social programs such as pre-kindergarten, adult day care, substance abuse, nutrition, utility assistance, job training, residential weatherization, and family counseling. JCCEO also operates the Arrington Head Start Center, home of Alabama's first public pre-K classroom, from here.

In 2007 Graymont Elementary School was added to the National Register of Historic Places.

== Desegregation ==
=== Armstrong v. Birmingham Board of Education ===
In 1960, James Armstrong, a local black barber, along with his two sons Dwight and Floyd filed a lawsuit in the U.S. District Court for the Northern District of Alabama. Armstrong v. Birmingham Board of Education was a class-action lawsuit filed to desegregate the schools of Birmingham. This case spanned from 1960 through 1983.

==== Case profile ====
"On May 28, 1963, Judge Seybourne Lynne denied injunctive relief, requiring the plaintiffs to exhaust the supposed remedies offered by the Alabama School Placement Law (a school choice law), following a course that it saw proper after the Supreme Court affirmed the decision in Shuttlesworth v. Birmingham Board of Education, upholding as facially constitutional the Alabama School Placement Law."

"The plaintiffs appealed Judge Lynne's decision to the Fifth Circuit, also asking for an injunction pending appeal, which they were granted. In that opinion, the court of appeals held that the plaintiffs did not have to exhaust potential remedies under the state law before seeking relief in the federal courts. The injunction ordered the Board and the Superintendent to submit a plan to the court for desegregation by August 19, 1963."

"On September 4, 1963, the first day of the new school year, Armstrong showed up with two of his children to register them at a previously all-white school."

"On June 18, 1964, the Fifth Circuit ruled on the merits of plaintiffs' appeal. The court vacated the district court's order denying injunctive relief and remanded it with instructions to require the school board to present a desegregation plan that met certain minimum standards across elementary, middle and high school. The court noted that after the earlier Court of Appeals decision, the Board had submitted an inadequate plan that did little beyond continue to accept voluntary transfers."

"According to news reports, Judge Guin dismissed the desegregation suit against Birmingham in 1983."

=== Aftermath of desegregation ===
Floyd Armstrong, age 11, and his brother Dwight, age 10, were enrolled by their father on September 4, 1963. That same night a bomb exploded at the home of Arthur Shores, a local civil rights activist, causing the school system to close temporarily. Three black students were also transferring to all-white Ramsey High School and West End High School in Birmingham. When schools reopened on September 9, brothers Floyd and Dwight were on their way back to Graymont Elementary with their father James and the Rev. Fred Shuttlesworth and attorneys fighting for integration. Alabama state troopers acted under orders from Governor George Wallace to prevent the children from entering the schools - the boys were turned away at the door.

President John F. Kennedy responded by sending the Alabama National Guard to escort the black student transfers into West End High School and Ramsay High School on September 10. Floyd and Dwight attended class for the first time at Graymont Elementary on September 10. On Wednesday September 11, police continued to push back demonstrators at West End and Ramsay. Graymont, however, was peaceful. Four days later, the 16th Street Baptist Church was bombed, killing four young girls.

In 2013, in recognition of the 50th anniversary of the segregation of the Birmingham city schools, Dwight Armstrong remembered those early days. "The staff was exemplary. One of their main objectives was to make sure we stayed safe. The majority of the students were just curious. I think they had a sense of being part of history themselves." A few "knuckleheads" — as Armstrong called them — caused problems and hurled insults at the white children who came too close to being friendly and stared the brothers down as they walked the halls.
