= Mount Ararat Baptist Church (Ensley, Alabama) =

Historic church in Alabama, United States

- U.S. National Register of Historic Places
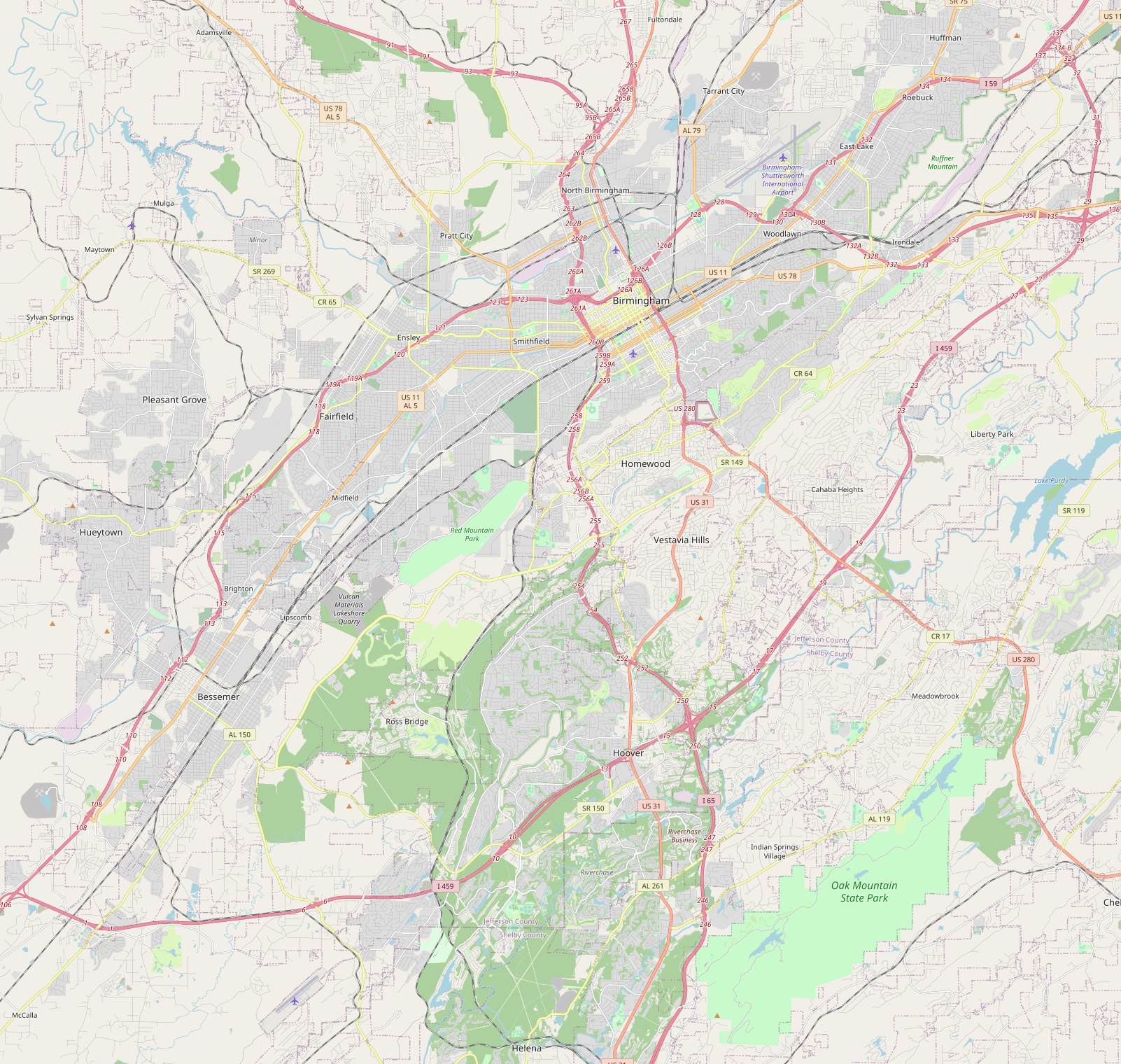
- Location within Birmingham, Alabama Location within Alabama Location within the United States
- Location: 1920 Slayden Ave., Ensley, Birmingham, Alabama
- Coordinates: 33°31′6″N 86°54′29″W
- Area: less than one acre
- Built: 1929
- Architect: Wallace Rayfield
- Architectural style: Gothic Revival
- MPS: Civil Rights Movement in Birmingham, Alabama MPS
- NRHP reference No.: 05000307
- Added to NRHP: April 19, 2005

Mount Ararat Baptist Church is a historic church at 1920 Slayden Avenue, Ensley in Birmingham, Alabama. It is located in the Ensley suburb, west of downtown Birmingham, and overlooks Highway 239. It was originally built in 1929 but was modified in 1950 to add a red brick veneer.

It was added to the National Register of Historic Places in 2005. It has also been known as Mount Ararat Missionary Baptist Church.

It was designed by African-American architect Wallace Rayfield and is described as having "a restrained Gothic Revival design". It is a cross-gabled church originally built in 1929 but veneered in smooth varitone red brick in 1950. It has a concrete foundation and a multi-gable asphalt shingle roof.

The church is significant for its association during 1956 to 1963 with the Alabama Christian Movement for Human Rights and with the Civil Rights Movement in Birmingham.
