= Red Mountain Suburbs Historic District =

Historic district in Alabama, United States

- U.S. National Register of Historic Places
- U.S. Historic district
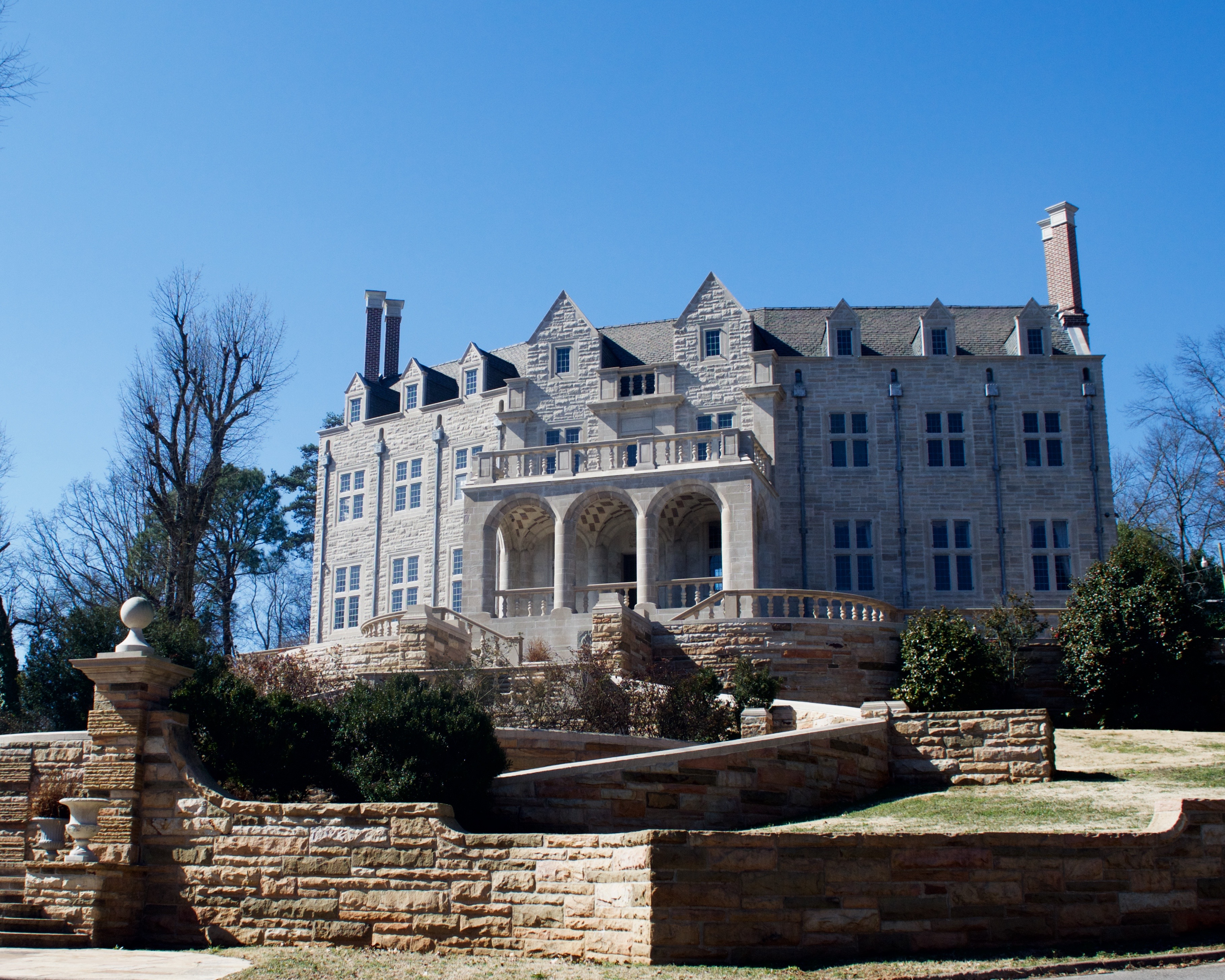

- Location within Alabama
- Location: Roughly bounded by Crest and Argyle and Altamont, Country Club, Salisbury, and Lanark Rds., Birmingham, Alabama
- Coordinates: 33°30′04″N 86°46′30″W
- Area: 333 acres (135 ha)
- Built: 1911
- Built by: Multiple
- Architect: Multiple
- Architectural style: Late 19th and 20th Century Revivals, Renaissance, Chateauesque
- NRHP reference No.: 85002719
- Added to NRHP: October 3, 1985

The Red Mountain Suburbs Historic District, in Jefferson County, Alabama, including parts of Birmingham and Mountain Brook, is a 333 acres (135 ha) historic district which was listed on the National Register of Historic Places in 1985. The listing included 392 contributing buildings and three contributing structures.

It is roughly bounded by Crest and Argyle and Altamont, Country Club, Salisbury, and Lanark Roads. Its boundaries were drawn to include the original (early 1900s) plats of the Valley View, Milner Heights, Altamont/Redmont Drives and Redmont Park subdivisions, all being "exclusive and upper middle class suburban neighboods".

It is asserted to include the state's best examples of Tudor Revival, Spanish Revival, Chateauesque, Classical Revival, Dutch Revival and Colonial Revival architecture, as well as great landscape architecture.
