= Morris Avenue–First Avenue North Historic District =

Historic district in Alabama, United States

- U.S. National Register of Historic Places
- U.S. Historic district
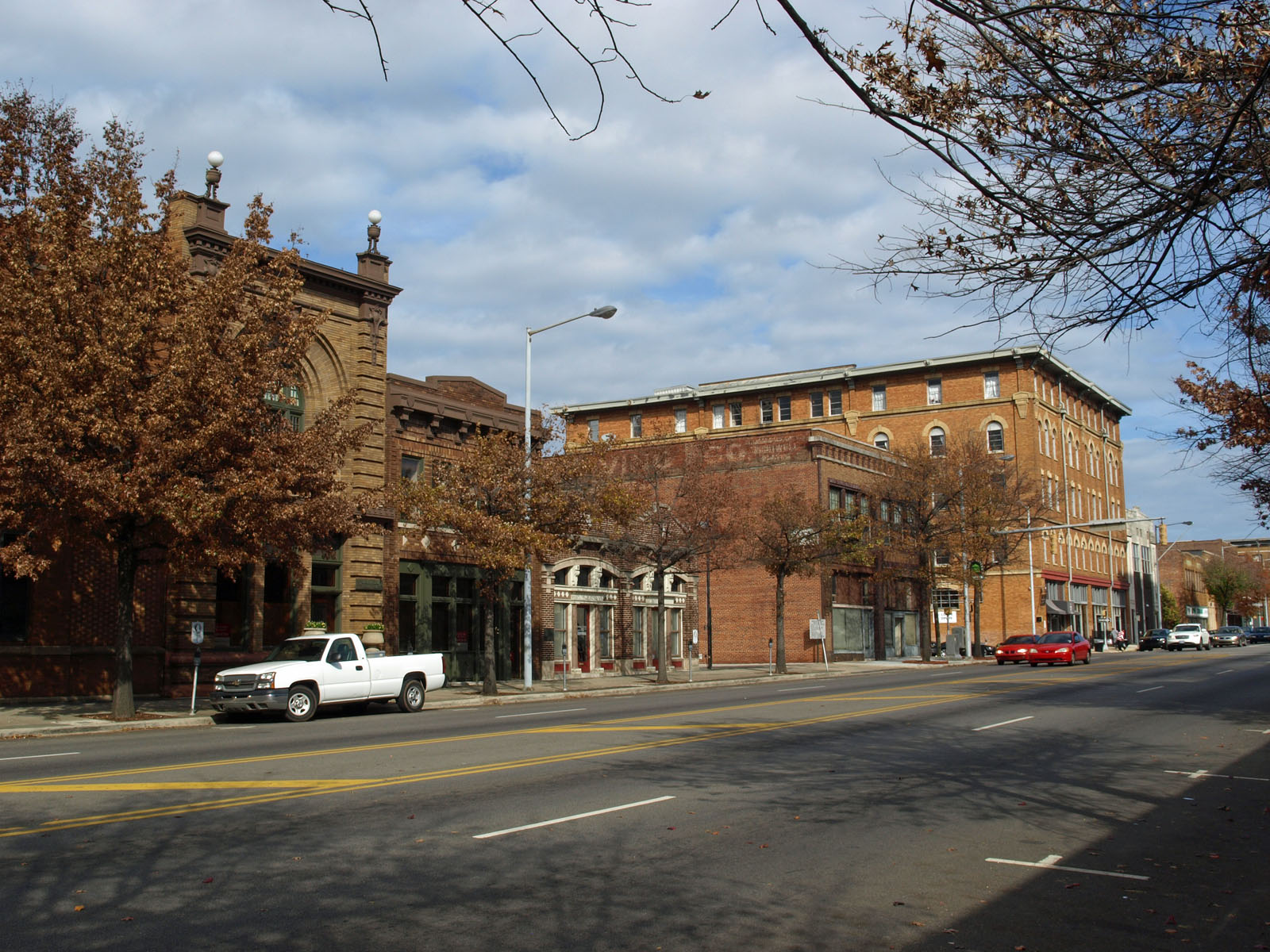
- 2100 block of 1st Avenue North in 2011

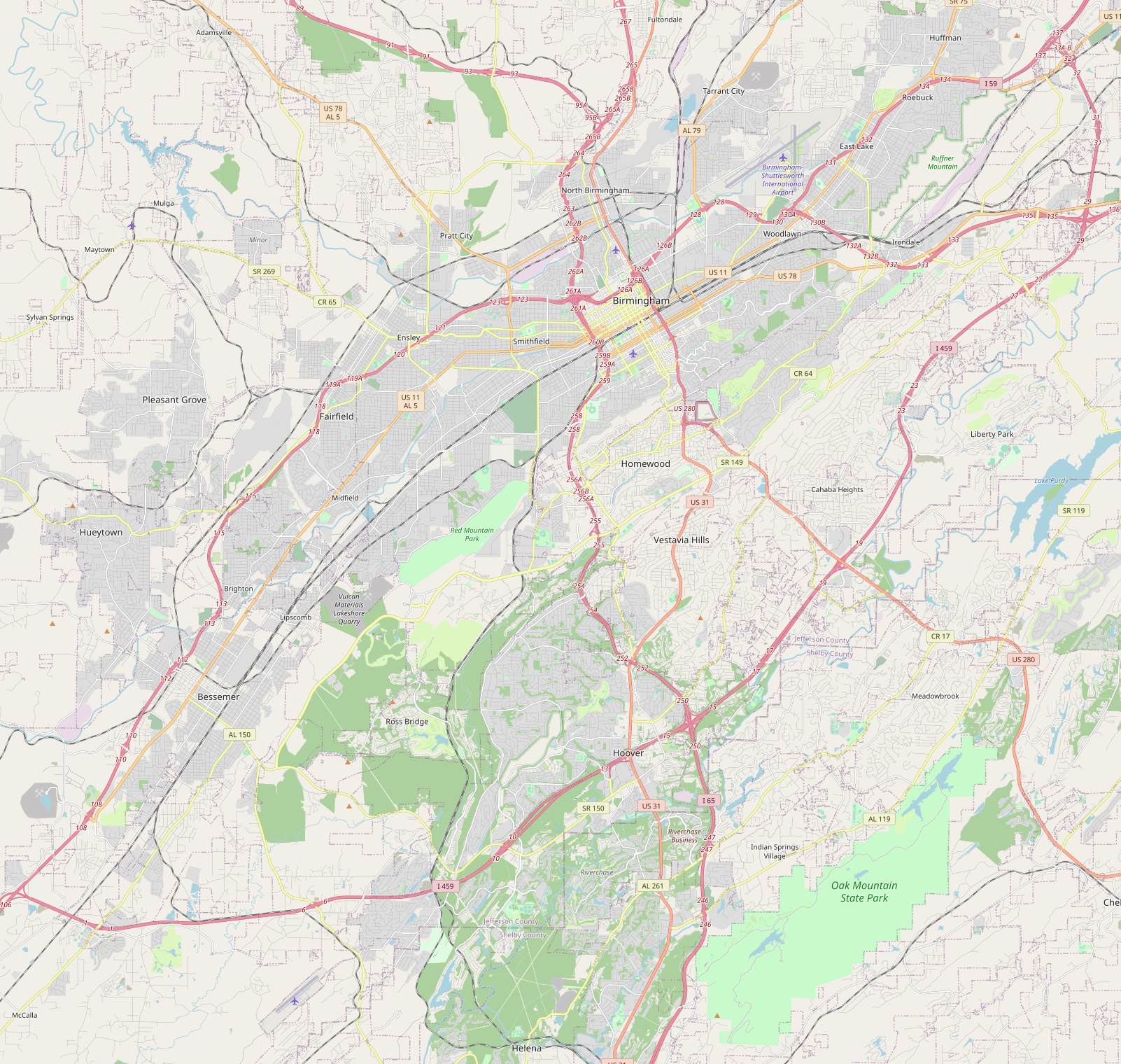
- Location within Birmingham, Alabama Location within Alabama Location within the United States
- Location: 2000–2400 blocks of Morris Ave. and 2100–2500 blocks of First Ave. N., Birmingham, Alabama
- Coordinates: 33°30′58″N 86°48′05″W
- Area: 9 acres (3.6 ha)
- Architect: William C. Weston; Miller & Martin
- Architectural style: Beaux Arts, Art Deco, Italianate
- NRHP reference No.: 86000009
- Added to NRHP: January 9, 1986

The Morris Avenue Historic District is an industrial district in Birmingham, Alabama. The district covers Morris Avenue from 20th Street to 25th Street and First Avenue from 21st to 26th Street. The Morris Avenue section comprises a set of late 19th century masonry warehouses that were Birmingham's main food distribution center until the 1950s. The First Avenue section of the district comprises a mixed neighborhood of late 19th century offices and warehouses, built shortly after the Morris Avenue development. The combined areas include 63 contributing structures, of the 69 buildings in the district. Notable buildings include the Liberty Trouser Building and the A.C. Legg Building on Morris Avenue on either side of the Moskowitz Warehouse. On First Avenue the Birmingham Realty Building and the A.A. Adams Realty Building, as well as the Goodall-Brown Building are notable.

The Morris Avenue district was placed on the National Register of Historic Places on April 24, 1973. It was incorporated into the Morris Avenue–First Avenue district on January 9, 1986.
