= Bradshaw House (Birmingham, Alabama) =

Historic house in Birmingham, Alabama, US

- U.S. National Register of Historic Places
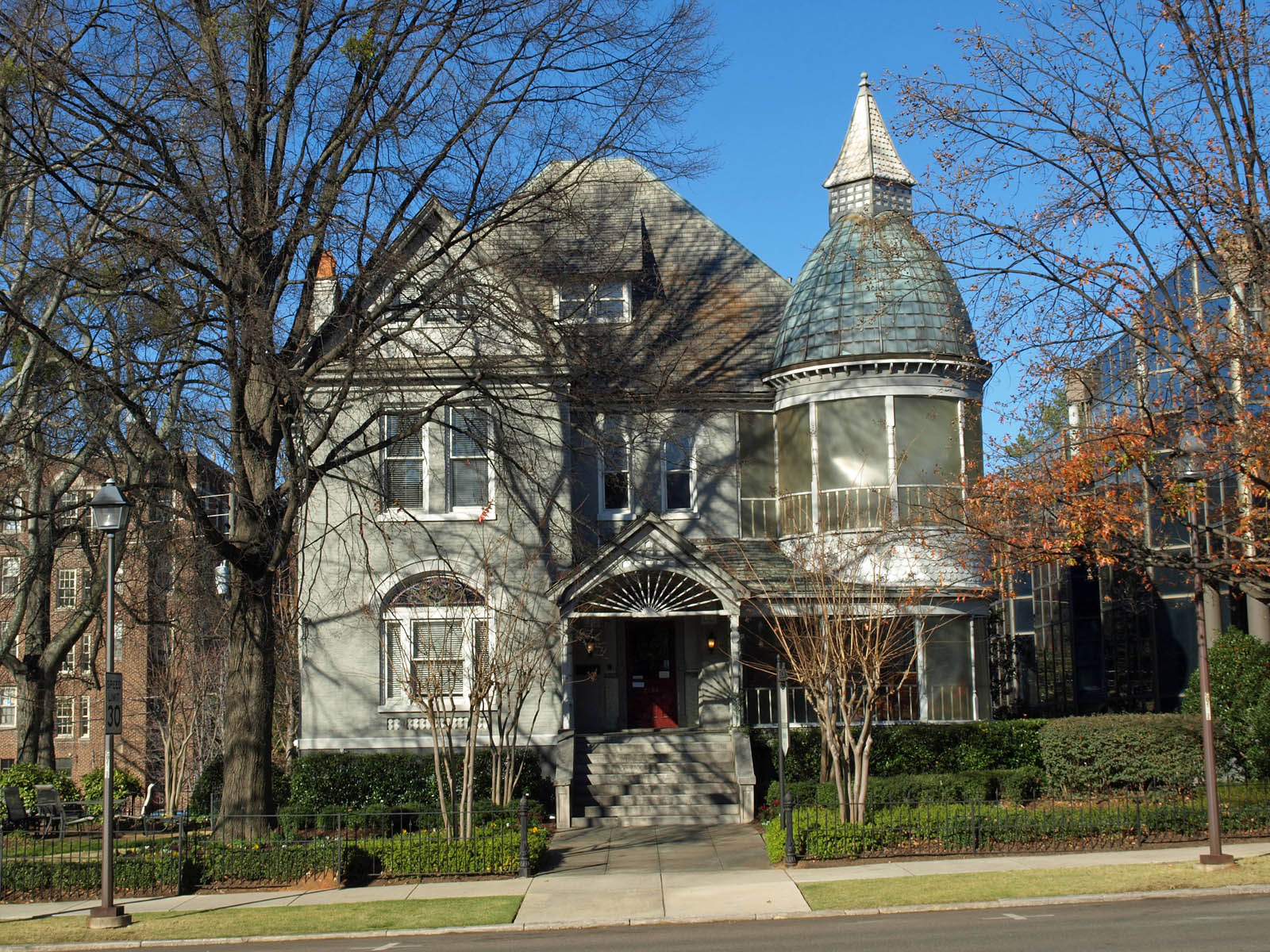

- Location within Alabama
- Location: 2154 Highland Avenue South, Birmingham, Alabama, U.S.
- Coordinates: 33°30′00″N 86°47′30″W
- Area: less than one acre
- Built: 1892
- Architectural style: Queen Anne
- NRHP reference No.: 80000690
- Added to NRHP: April 28, 1980

Bradshaw House is a historic residence built in 1892, at 2154 Highland Avenue South in Birmingham, Alabama. It has been listed on the National Register of Historic Places since 1980, for architecture. It has also been referred to as the Bradshaw–Ramsay House, and the Caldwell and Minnie Bradshaw House.

== History ==
The Bradshaw House is a 19th-century Queen Anne style house. It is one of two remaining Queen Anne style houses in the city of Birmingham, the other being the Hassinger House (1895). The house was built for attorney Caldwell Bradshaw and his family in 1892. It is four stories in height and 6,500 square feet (600 m^{2}). The Bradshaw family remained in the house until 1902.

The second owner of the home was Erskine Ramsay, an engineer who worked at the local Pratt Consolidated Coal Company. The law firm Davis & Norris occupies the home.

== See also ==
- National Register of Historic Places listings in Birmingham, Alabama
