= Highland Park, Alabama =

Neighborhood in Birmingham, Alabama

Coordinates: 33.5060°N 86.7844°W

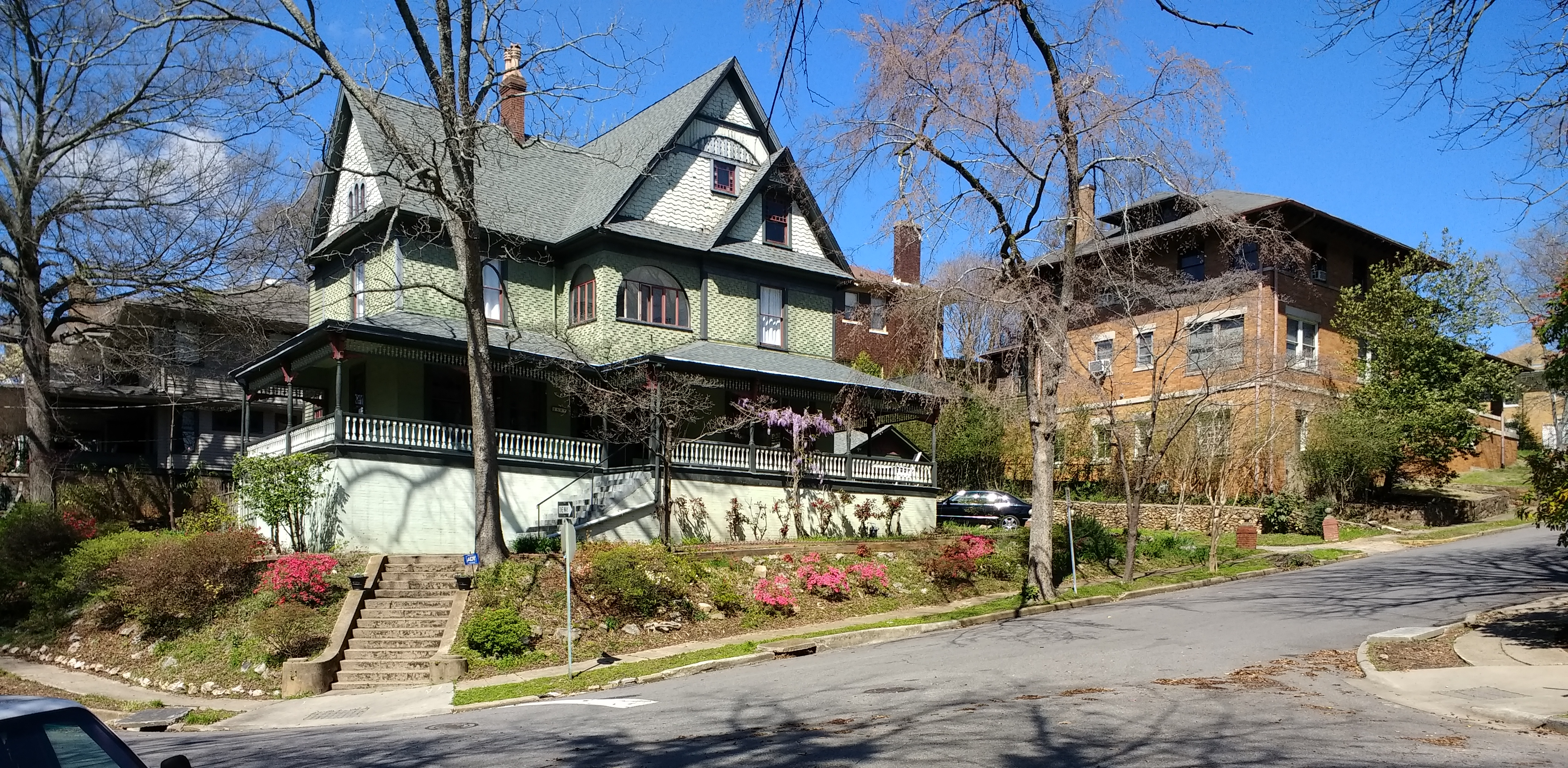
Houses in Highland Park

The Highland Park neighborhood is one of the oldest neighborhoods in Birmingham, Alabama. Originally developed as a suburb of Birmingham by the Elyton Land Company, it lies approximately two miles south of the city’s central business district and is one of the more prosperous and diverse neighborhoods within the city. Homes and apartments built in the late 19th and early 20th centuries exist alongside contemporary condominiums and office buildings. New developments continue to arise in and around the neighborhood.

== Background ==
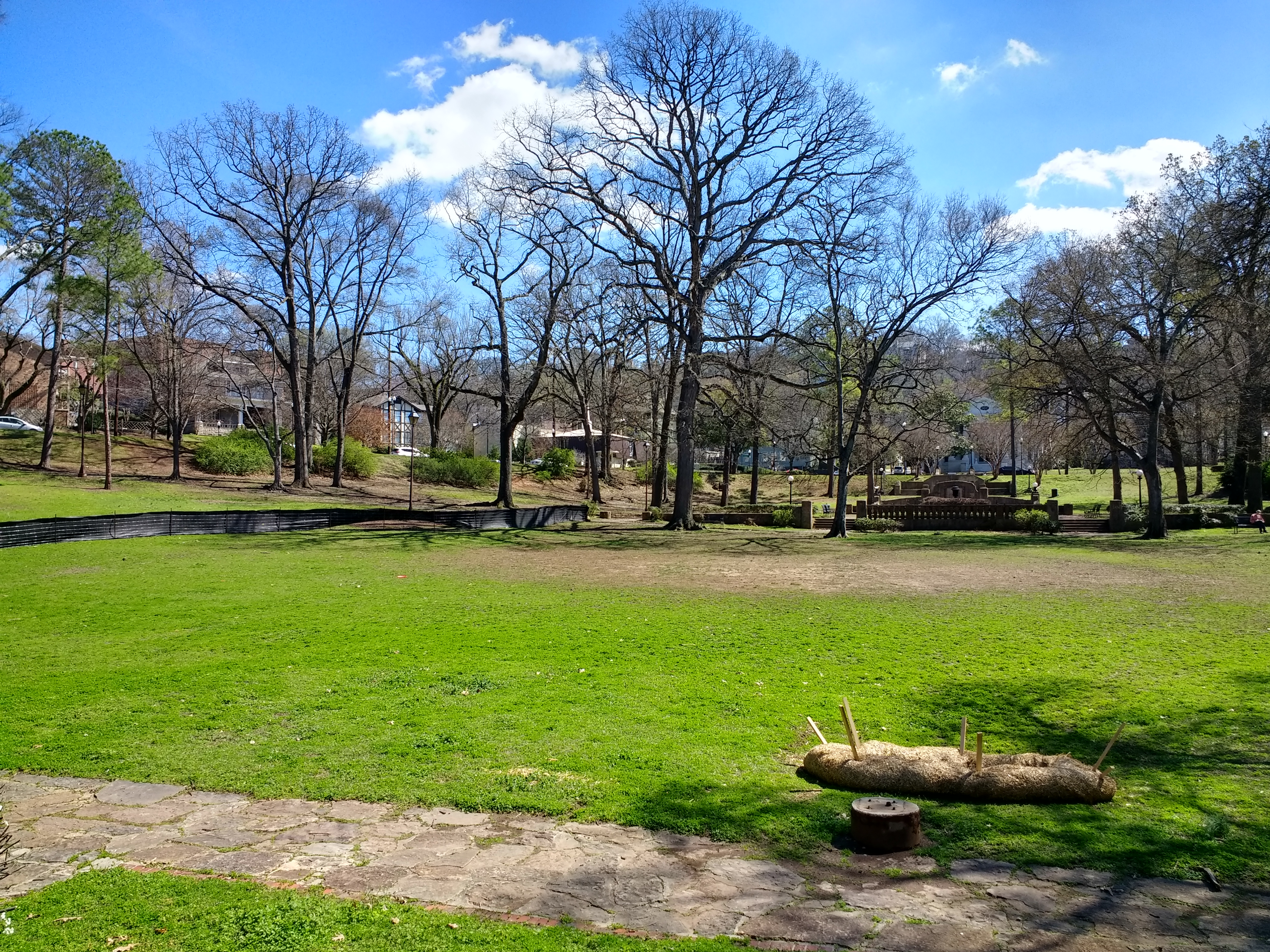
Rhodes Park

Highland Park is a hilly and wooded area, and contains a number of historic urban parks, among them Underwood, Rhodes, Caldwell, and Rushton Parks. Highland Avenue, the main boulevard, was laid out in the late 19th century when Highland Park was a suburb outside the city limits of Birmingham, and runs along the foothills of Red Mountain. The broad, winding corridor, among the most scenic and pleasant in the city, is nearly level. Prior to the 1930s, street cars ran in both directions along the length of Highland Avenue and into downtown Birmingham. Historic Highland Park Golf Course, also named Boswell Park for the famed blind golfer Charley Boswell, is the oldest golf course in Alabama and the site of some of Robert "Bobby" Jones' first victories, and lies at the eastern end of Highland Avenue.

The neighborhood is home to several historic churches and turn of the century homes. On the east, the neighborhood borders Five Points South, the University of Alabama at Birmingham, and the Lakeview Entertainment District, neighborhoods where some of Birmingham's best known restaurants and night spots are found. To the east is the historic Forest Park neighborhood of stately homes, and to the south is Red Mountain, atop which sits the Redmont neighborhood, once the abode of Birmingham's wealthiest industrialists.

== Notable residents ==
- Sylvia Swayne (born 1997), first openly transgender woman to run for public office in Alabama
