= Highland Park Golf Course =

Public golf course in Alabama, US

- Interactive map of Highland Park Golf Course
- 33°30′39″N 86°46′30″W

Club information
- Location: Birmingham, Alabama
- Established: 1903
- Type: Public
- Operator: Honours Golf
- Tota holes: 18
- Website: www.highlandparkgolf.com
- Par: 70
- Length: 5,801
- Course rating: 68.1
- Slope rating: 128

Highland Park Golf Course is a public golf course in Birmingham, Alabama. Established in 1903 as the Country Club of Birmingham, it is the oldest golf course in the state of Alabama.

Bobby Jones won the Birmingham Country Club Invitational at Highland Park in 1916 at the age of 14.

Charlie Boswell shot an 81 on the course on Oct. 5, 1956. The course was renamed the Charlie Boswell Golf Course at Highland Park. Today, Boswell is honored by a plaque on the first tee box. Honors Golf took over the golf club and made course and course house improvements and changed the name back to Highland Park Golf Course.
