= Agee House =

- U.S. National Register of Historic Places
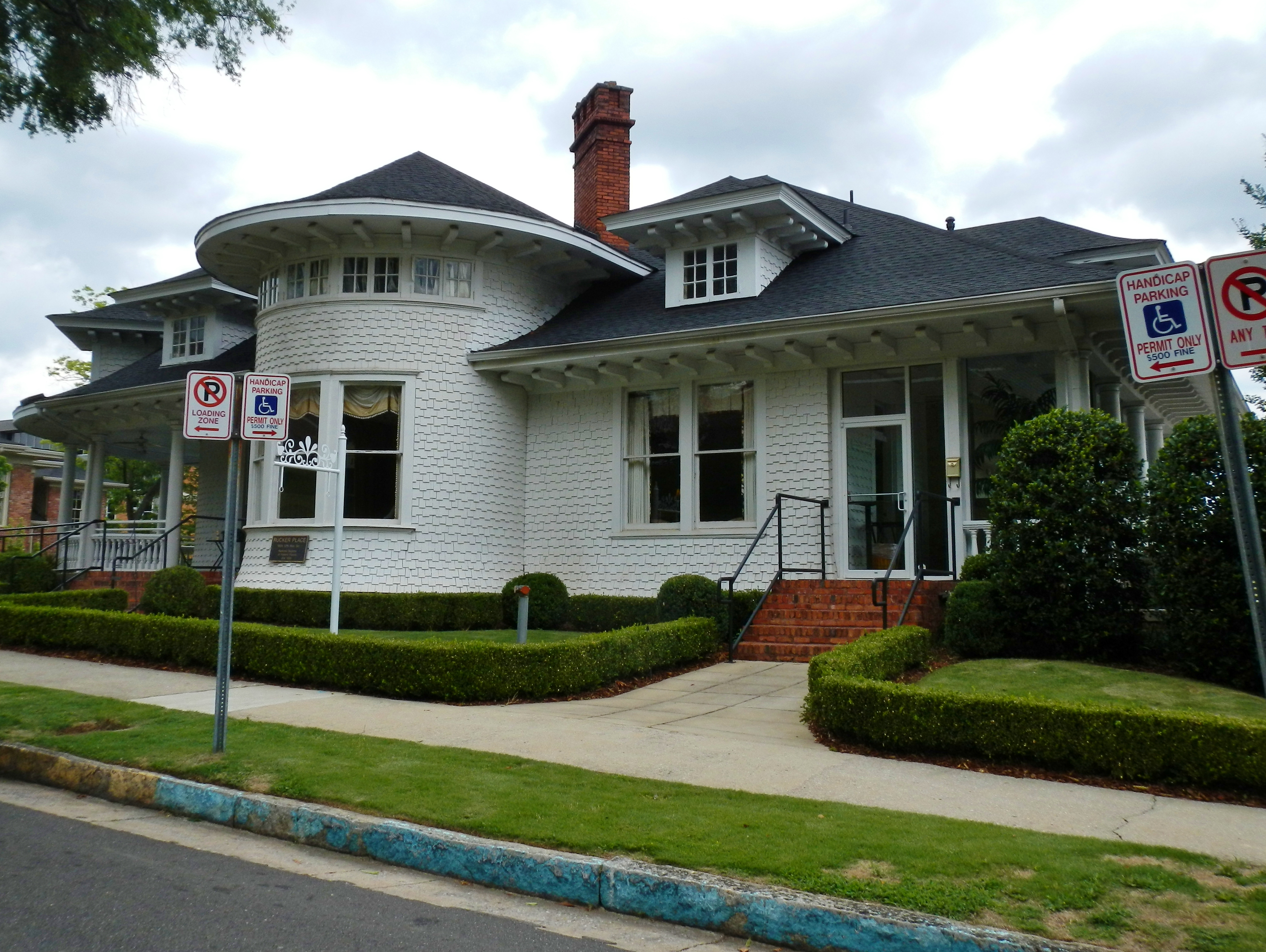

- Location within Alabama
- Location: 1804 Twelfth Ave. S, Birmingham, Alabama
- Coordinates: 33°29′55″N 86°47′54″W
- Area: less than one acre
- Built: c.1900
- Architectural style: Shingle Style
- NRHP reference No.: 86001962
- Added to NRHP: August 28, 1986

The Agee House (also called the Walter Agee Residence, the Rucker-Agee House, and Rucker Place) is an architecturally distinguished structure at 1804 Twelfth Avenue South in Birmingham, Alabama, United States. It was built at the turn of the century, around 1900, and was listed on the National Register of Historic Places in 1986.

== History ==
The Agee House was built as one of a pair of houses by an unknown architect, and was given by Edmund Winchester Rucker, a former Confederate general, to his daughter, Louise Rucker, and her fiancée, Walter Agee. The house was owned by the family until the mid-1950s, when it was purchased by Dr. J. Clayton Davie. In 1975, it was converted into a medical office by Davie and was purchased by Gail and Jack Thompson in 2002 for use as a wedding and event venue. In 2021, it was sold to Tyler Lyne and Timothy Owens, who had plans to use it as a "multidimensional restaurant."

== Architecture ==
It is significant as the "only existing example of fully-developed Shingle style architecture in Birmingham": "The house features important features identified with the style such as an overall free form entirely covered with textured shingles, a hipped roof with multi-cross hipped dormers, a half round two-story bay with a roof which blends into the volume of the main house roofline, banded windows and wrap-around porches. Dissemination of the academic Shingle style across America during the late 19th century was widespread but never highly popular, and it is especially rare in Alabama."

The house's wide eaves seem to evoke the later Prairie style, and the repeated curves presages the later Streamline Moderne style.
