= Southside (Birmingham) =

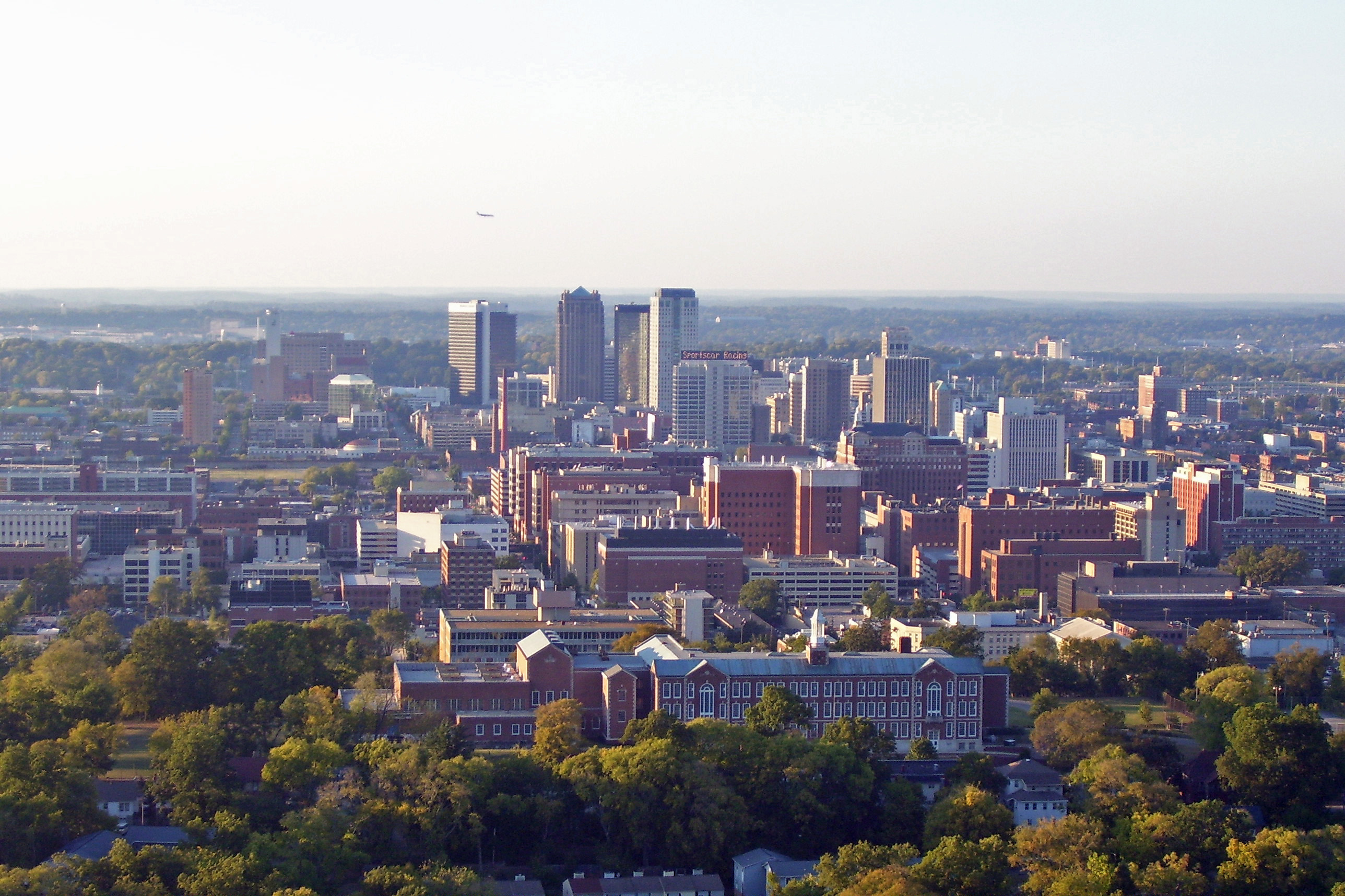
- View of Birmingham looking north from the crest of Red Mountain, with Southside (including UAB and Ramsay High School) in the immediate foreground.
- Interactive map of Southside
- Coordinates: 33°30′2″N 86°48′0″W
- Time zone: UTC−6 (CST)
  - Summer (DST): UTC−5 (CDT)
- ZIP Codes: 35205
- Area codes: 205, 659

The historic Southside community is situated on the hilly and forested slopes of Red Mountain just south of Birmingham, Alabama's central business district. The neighborhood includes the landscape from Railroad Park to the crest of Red Mountain, and from Interstate 65 to U.S. Highway 31 (or "Red Mountain Expressway"). It is one of the most densely populated residential neighborhoods in the city and home to the University of Alabama at Birmingham (UAB) and its adjacent hospitals, the state's second-largest employer. The Birmingham Business Journal anticipated Southside to have the highest income growth of any zip code in the metro area.

== Characteristics ==
Southside is one of the most cosmopolitan neighborhoods in Birmingham, and was historically known for its counterculture. Five Points South in particular has long been a popular nightlife and entertainment district. Because of the international draw of UAB, Southside is the most racially and ethnically diverse neighborhood in Birmingham and is also considered one of its main "gayborhoods", playing host to the city's annual gay pride parade each June. With its college town atmosphere, the community has a high percentage of bicycle commuters, and according to walkscore.com, has two of the top three most walkable zip code neighborhoods in the metropolitan area. Southside has several local businesses, and many residents are employed in the medical, research, and banking industries that anchor Birmingham's economy, or at one of the law firms located in Five Points South. George Ward Park, Vulcan Trail, Magic City Rotary trail, and Railroad Park afford residents with opportunities for outdoor recreation and scenic views. The Vulcan statue, Birmingham's city symbol, crowns the crest of Red Mountain and is visible from most areas of the neighborhood. Other attractions include Good People Brewery, Dreamland Bar-B-Que, the Frank Fleming Storyteller Fountain, the Alys Stephens Center and the Regions Field baseball stadium.

== History ==
Much of Southside was established in the 1890s by John Phelan and Robert Jemison Sr. (of the South-Side Land Co. and the Jemison Real Estate & Insurance Co., respectively) as a leafy streetcar suburb for Birmingham's middle and upper class residents similar to Atlanta's Inman Park neighborhood. The proximity of UAB and the magnet school Ramsay High School stabilized the community during white flight in the late 20th century, and the area continues to maintain some of the lowest crime rates in the city. As one of Birmingham's oldest residential neighborhoods, it has recently experienced a revival in demand for housing options with historic character, as well as the construction of new apartments and condominiums. The neighborhood contains seven historic districts subject to design review under the neighborhood association subcommittee; these districts include an eclectic mix of houses built between 1890 and 1920, primarily representing the Prairie, Craftsman, Neoclassical, and Victorian styles, with a few examples of Queen Anne and Colonial Revival. The network of sidewalks, tree-lined streets and rear-access alleys recently served as a conceptual model for the new urbanism community of Mt. Laurel located thirty minutes south by car. Southside residents have organized into three neighborhood associations (Five Points South, Glen Iris, and Southside) which meet monthly. Most residences are within city council district 3, currently served by Councilor Valerie Abbott, though district 5 and 6 are also represented.

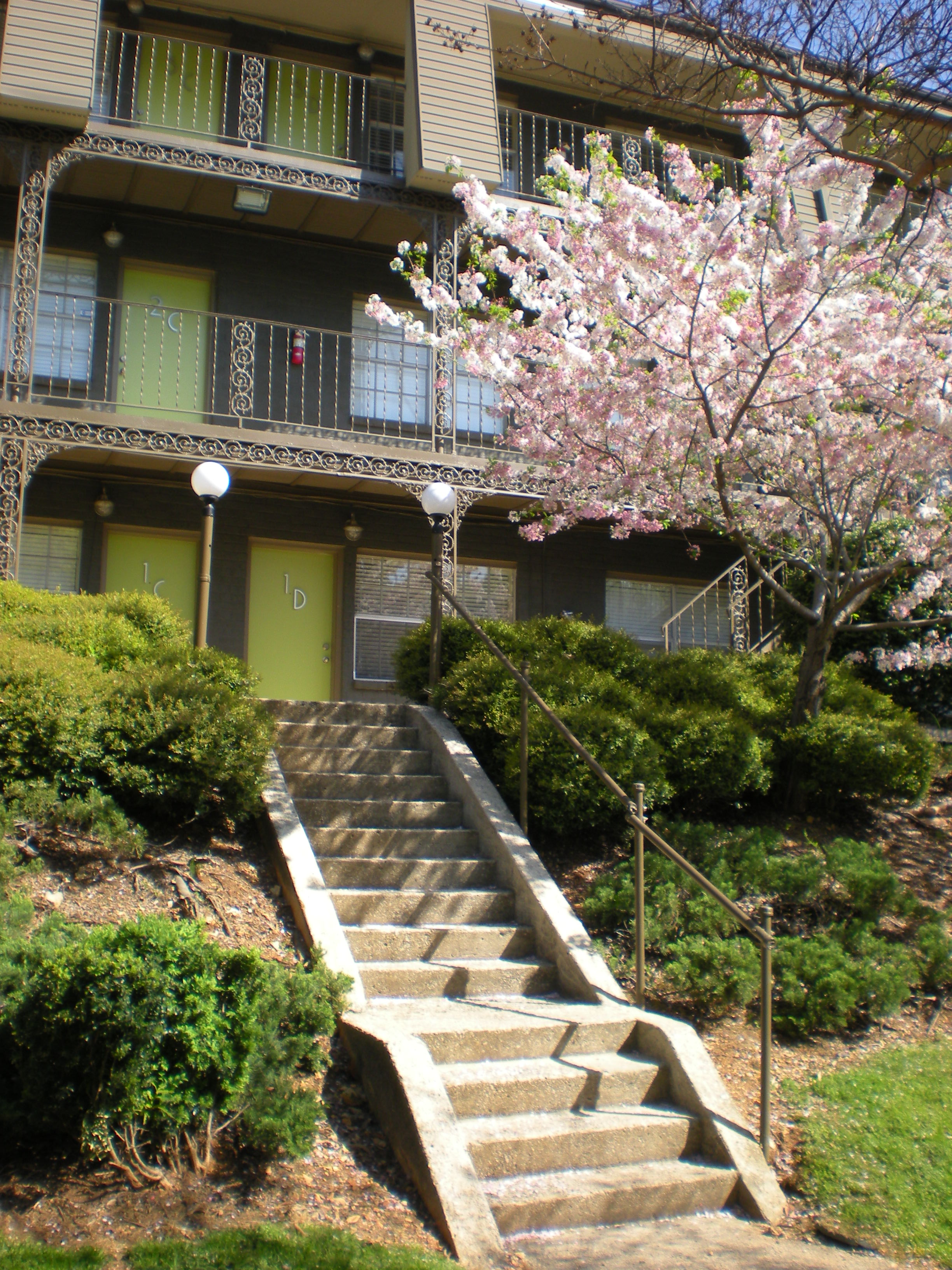

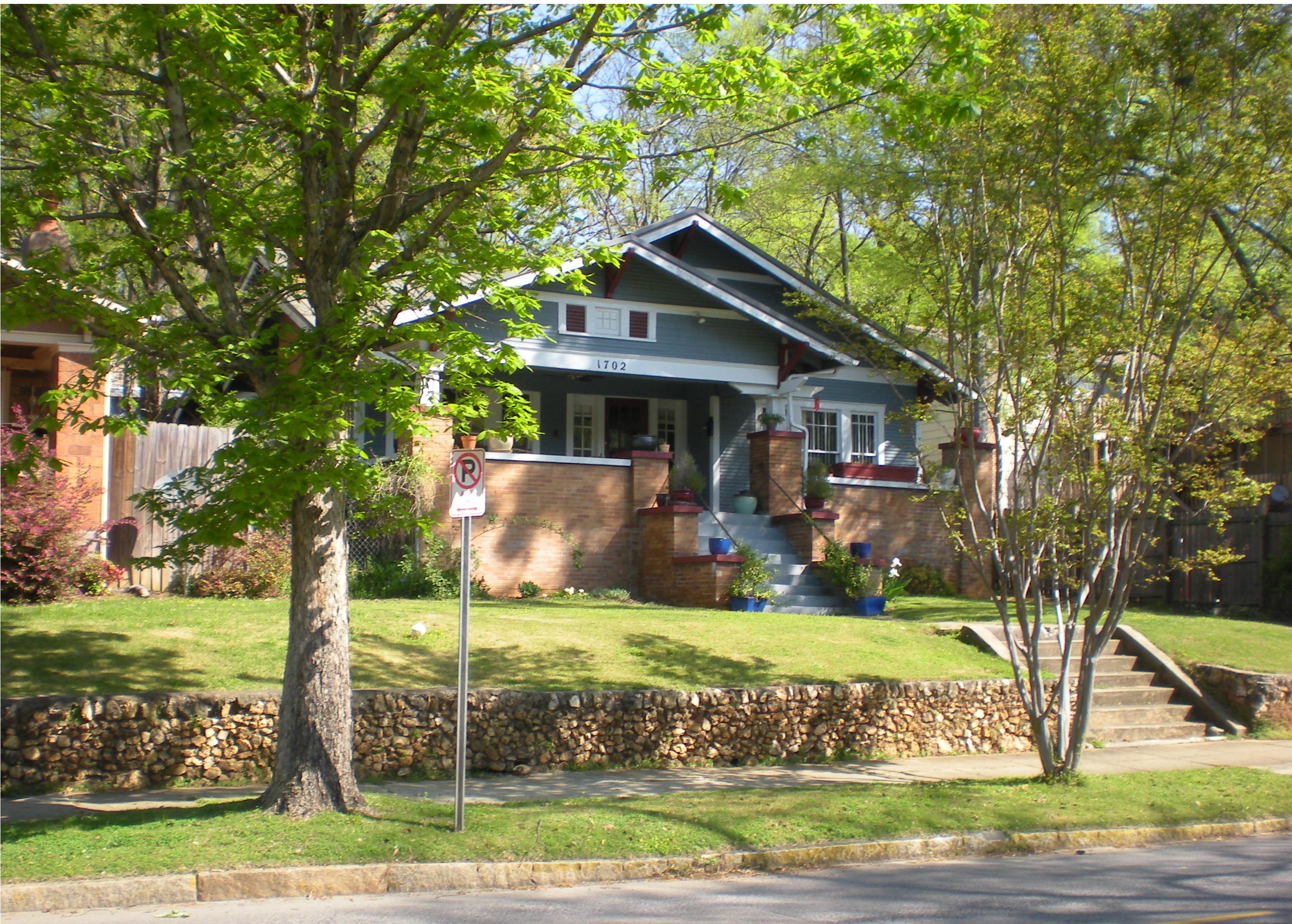

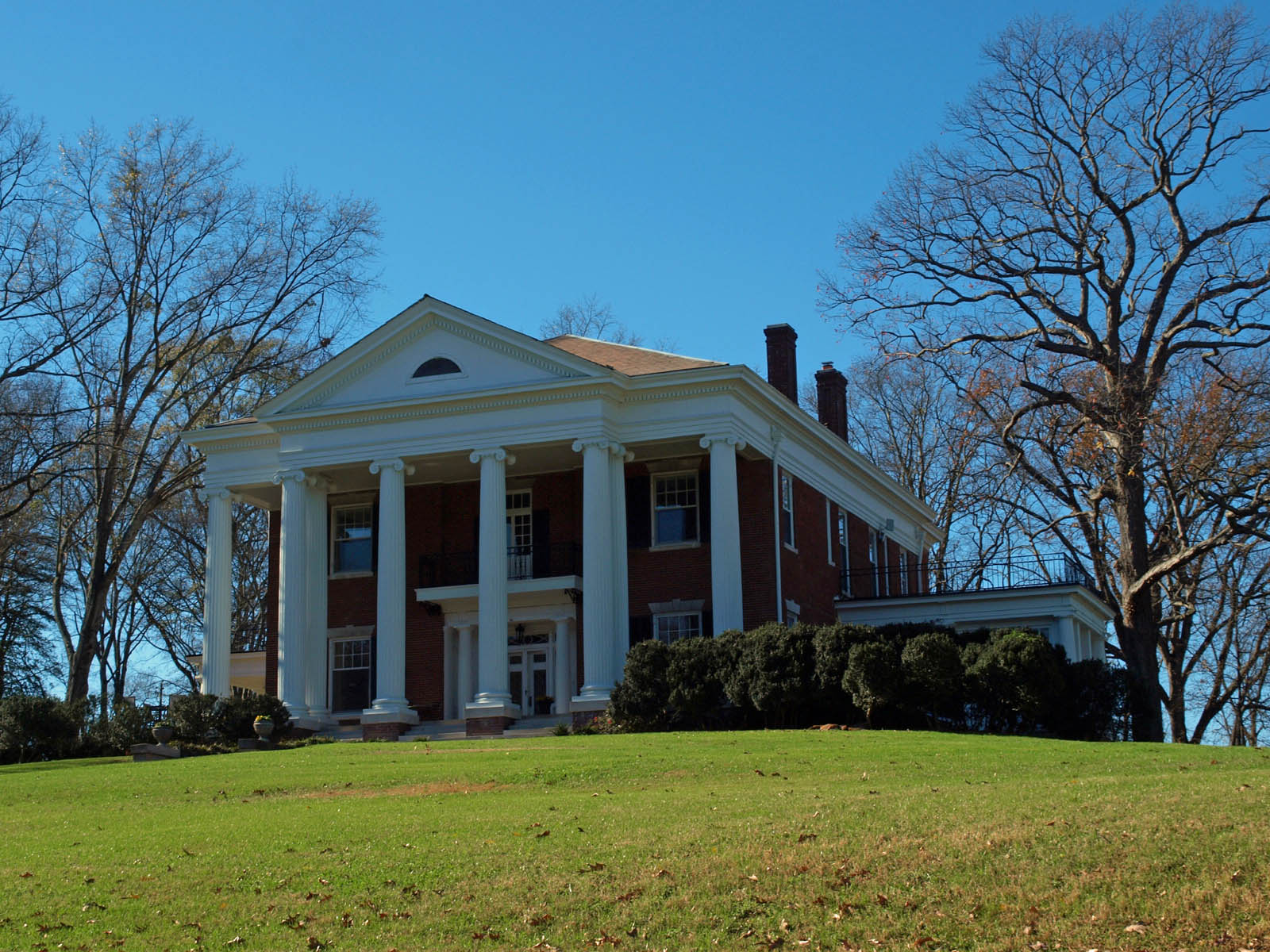

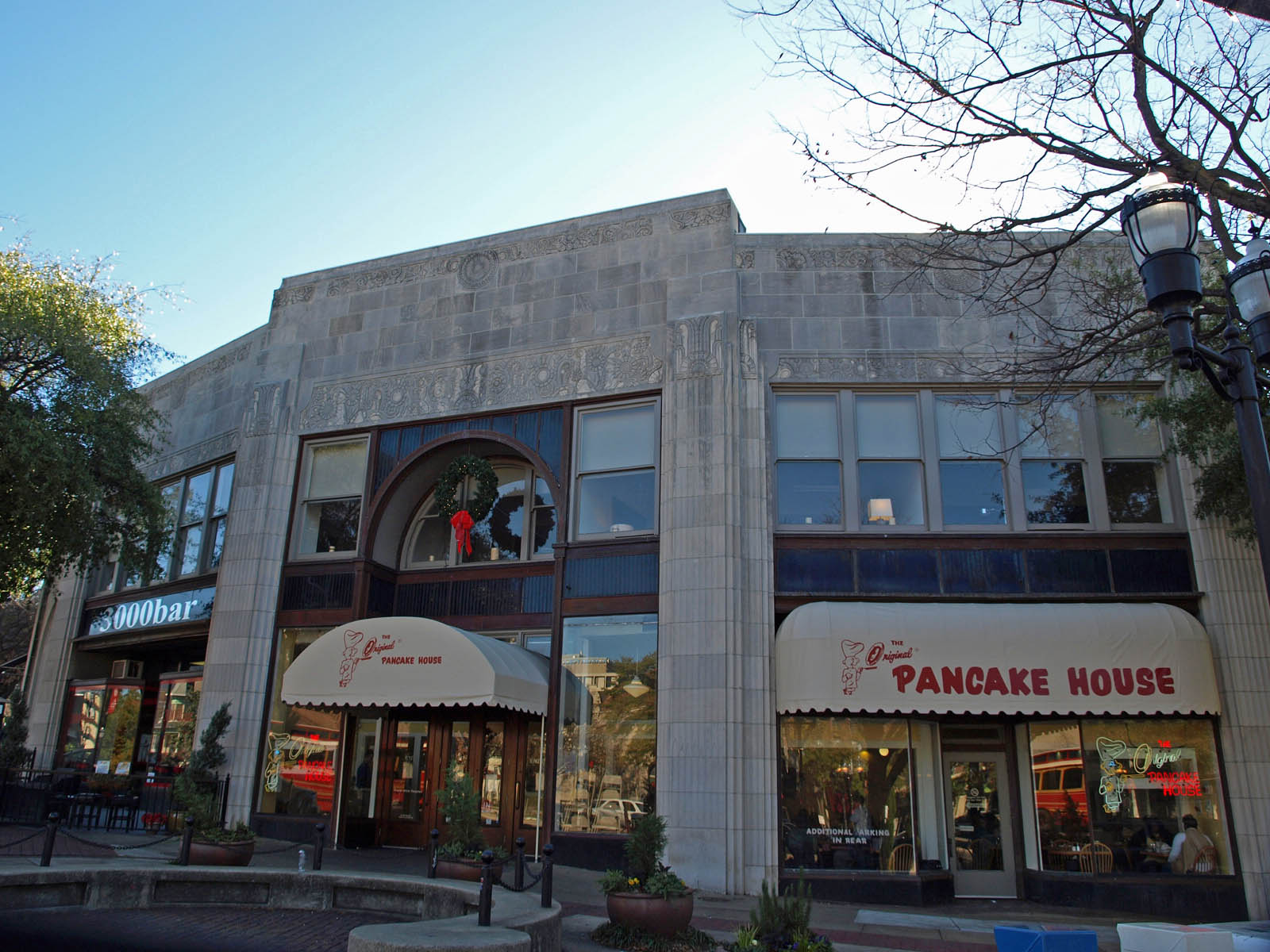

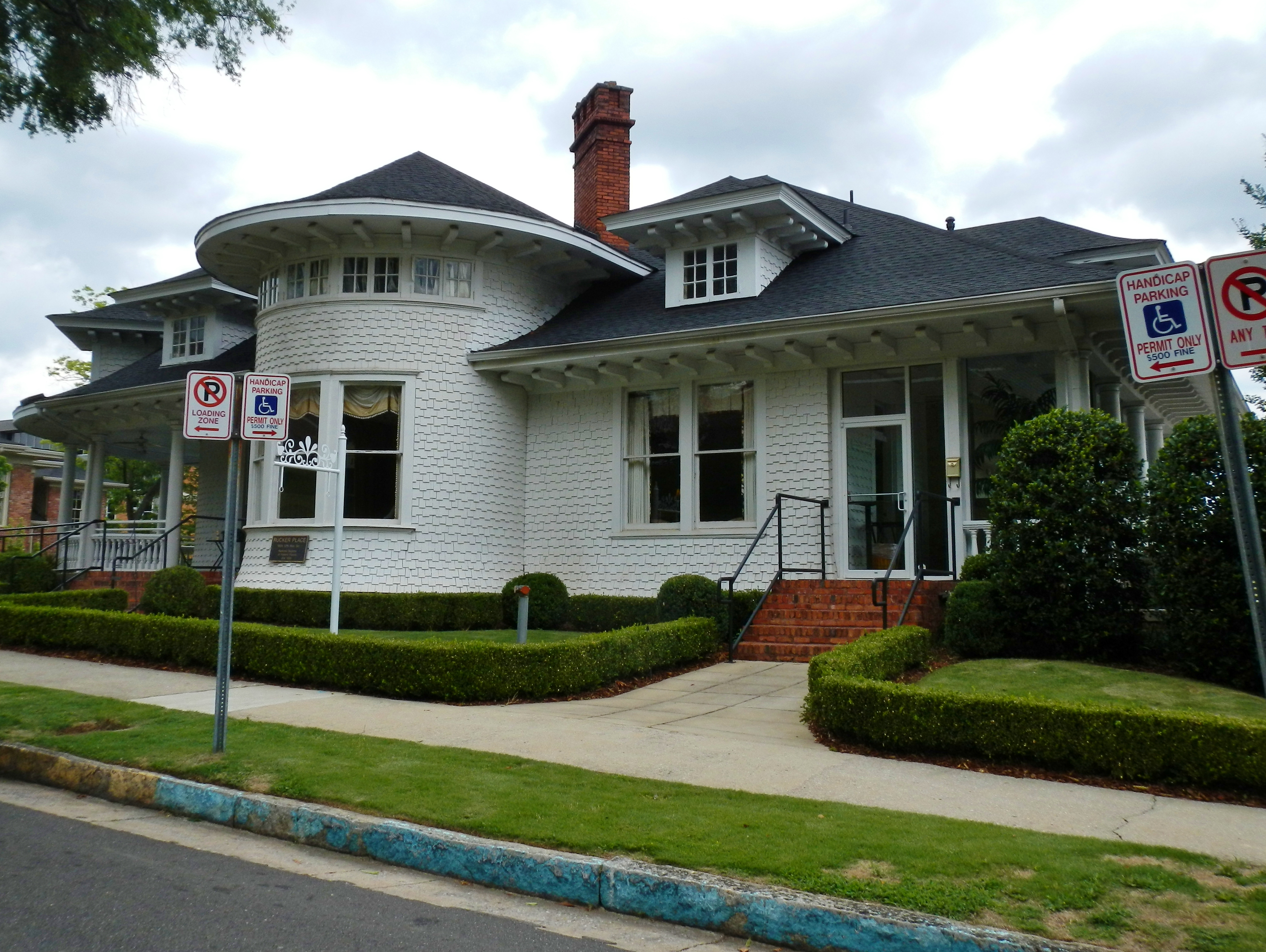

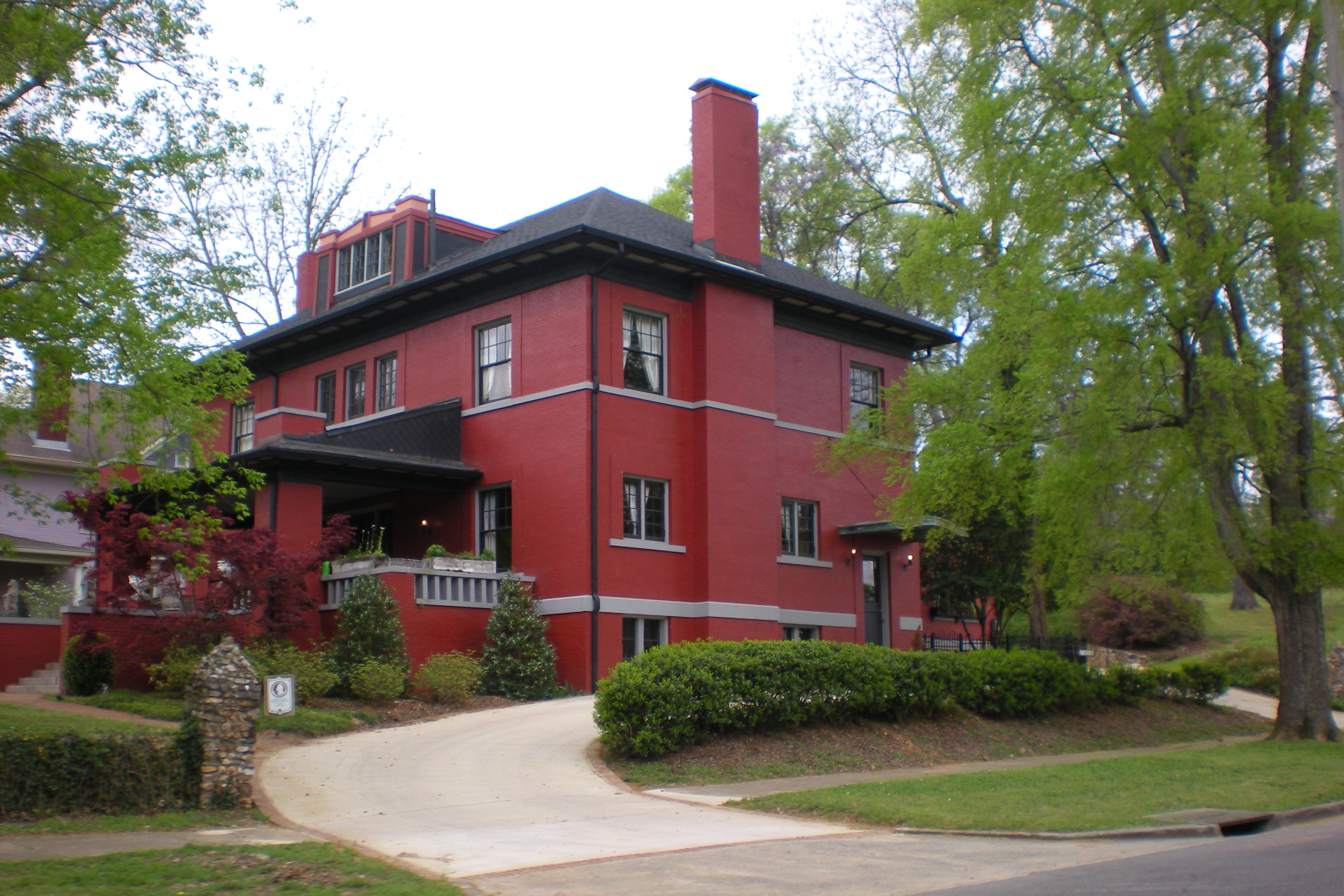

== Public services ==
=== Libraries ===
Southside Public Library, UAB Sterne Library, UAB Lister Hill Biomedical Library (limited access)

=== Transportation ===
- UAB Blazer Express: All Lines
- Dart Express Bus: Blue line (Five points South to Downtown Business District on 20th St), Green Line ( Lakeview district to UAB on University Blvd)
- Birmingham City Bus System: line 14 throughout, lines 48 and 8 going west, lines 17 and 12 going east, and lines 39, 42, 31, 72, and 51c going south

=== Education ===
- In neighborhood: Glen Iris Elementary, Epic Alternative Elementary, Ramsay Magnet High School, The University of Alabama at Birmingham
- Includes areas serving: Avondale Elementary, Arrington Middle School, Putnam Middle School, Carver High School

=== Police ===
UAB Police Department (Located near Phelan Park), Birmingham Police Department South Precinct Headquarters (Located in Five Points South)

=== Birmingham Fire & Rescue ===
Station #2 Southside, Station # 3 Highland, Station # 7 Greensprings
