= Ensley, Birmingham, Alabama =

Ensley
- Birmingham Neighborhood
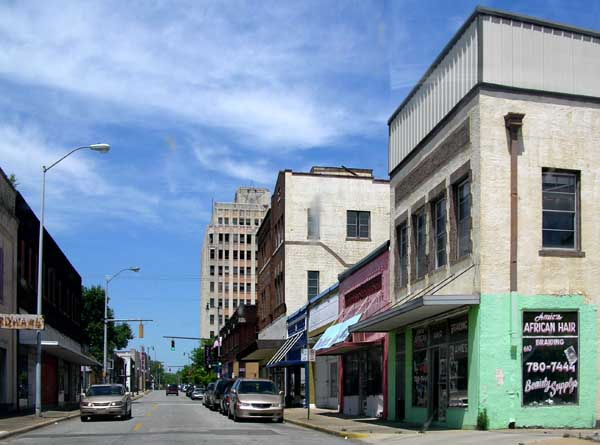
- 19th Street through downtown Ensley
- Interactive map of Ensley
- Coordinates: 33°30′12″N 86°53′30″W
- Country: United States
- State: Alabama
- City: Birmingham
- Elevation: 528 ft (161 m)
- Time zone: UTC-6 (CST)
  - Summer (DST): UTC-5 (CDT)
- ZIP Codes: 35218
- Area codes: 205, 659

Ensley is a large city neighborhood in Jefferson County, Alabama, United States. It was once a separate and thriving industrial city. It was formally incorporated on February 12, 1899, but later annexed into Birmingham on January 1, 1910, under the "Greater Birmingham" legislation.

== History ==
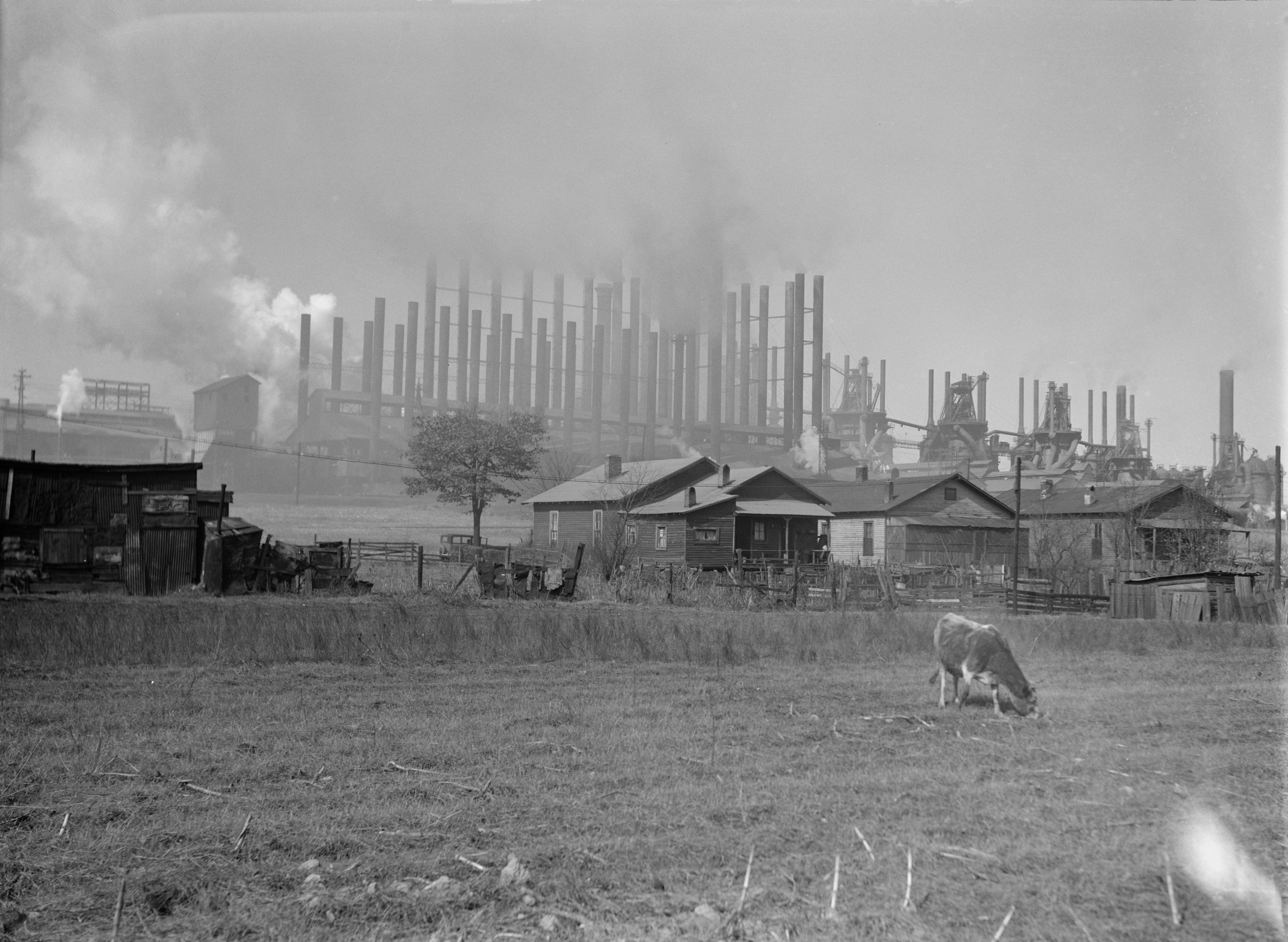
An industrial scene in Ensley (1937)

The community was founded in 1886 by Memphis entrepreneur, Enoch Ensley, as a new industrial city on the outskirts of a rapidly developing Birmingham (then just 15 years old) and directly adjacent to the Pratt coal seam. Zealously promoting and investing his own wealth in the project, Ensley soon attracted the interest of the Tennessee Coal, Iron and Railroad Company (TCI), which bought a controlling interest in the Ensley Land Company. In the first year of development, sanitary engineer Edwin Waring, Jr. of Rhode Island was contracted to lay out the new city's streets and infrastructure, including an early application of separate storm and sanitary sewers. Meanwhile, Ensley and TCI erected four 200-ton blast furnaces which were in operation by April 1889, the largest such grouping in the world. Despite the grand beginning, a series of setbacks began with the death of Colonel Ensley in 1891. The economic panic of 1893 resulted in the dissolution of the land company. The entire property was sold at sheriff's auction for less than $16,000.

In 1898, the Ensley Land Company was reorganized and active industrial development resumed, including the construction of hundreds of small workers' cottages. It was here that TCI pioneered the open-hearth process of making steel in the Birmingham District. By 1906, two more blast furnaces were completed and a record 400,000 tons of steel were produced in a single year. Schools, churches, public buildings and stores were rapidly constructed to keep pace with the scores of new mills and plants opening up.

The success of the development established a corridor of industrial development reaching out to the southwest of Birmingham. During its heyday between the late 1890s and the Great Depression, Ensley was known for its lively fraternal halls and dance clubs, including Tuxedo Junction at the crossing of the Wylam and Pratt City streetcar lines. In 1939, the hit song "Tuxedo Junction" made the spot nationally famous. It was written by local musician Erskine Hawkins and arranged by Glenn Miller.

When U. S. Steel purchased TCI in 1907, they began planning a new, larger plant northeast in the center of a large planned community to be named Corey (now named Fairfield). Although the new plant was close enough that workers living in Ensley wouldn't have to relocate, the move did stifle any ongoing development. With the loss of the major industrial activities in the 1970s, Ensley has lost much of its population and economic base.

== Demographics ==
Historical population
Census	Pop.	Note	%±
1900	2,100		—
U.S. Decennial Census

Ensley was listed on the 1900 U.S. Census as an incorporated community. It was annexed into Birmingham in 1910.

== Education ==
This area is served by the Birmingham City Schools, although seven of the eight public school buildings in Ensley, including Council Elementary School and Bush Middle School, have been shuttered over the past 50 years. Ensley High School, which was founded in 1901, closed in 2006 with the student body merging into the new P.D. Jackson-Olin High School. It also caught fire in the Fall of 2018 and was a catastrophic loss. Holy Family Cristo Rey High School is a private Catholic school in Ensley.

== Notable people ==
- Charlie Finley, baseball owner
- Charlie Perkins, baseball player
- Izzy Jannazzo, boxer
- Erk Russell, American football coach
- Cornelius Bennett, American football Hall of Fame linebacker
- Paul Williams (1939-1973), original member of The Temptations
- Eddie Kendricks (1939-1992), original member of The Temptations
- Sonia Sanchez, Black Arts Movement and contemporary poet (1934- )
- Peahead Walker (1899-1970), American football coach
- Bob Veale, baseball player
- Andrew Foster, deaf missionary
