= Woodlawn (Birmingham) =

Neighborhood in Alabama, United States

- Birmingham Neighborhood
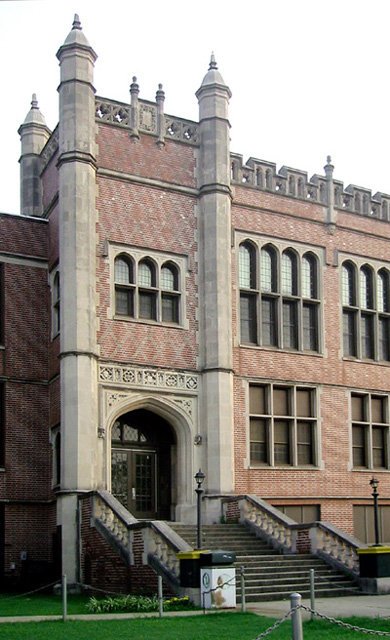
- Woodlawn High School
- Interactive map of Woodlawn
- Coordinates: 33°32′26″N 86°45′06″W
- Country: United States
- State: Alabama
- City: Birmingham
- Elevation: 640 ft (200 m)
- Time zone: UTC-6 (CST)
  - Summer (DST): UTC-5 (CDT)
- ZIP Codes: 35212
- Area codes: 205, 659
- Website: www.woodlawnunited.org

Woodlawn is a community in northeast Birmingham, in Jefferson County, Alabama, United States.

== History ==
Present-day Woodlawn was settled by a group of farming families who entered the area in 1815, just as it was opened to settlement by the Treaty of Fort Jackson. The community took its name from the Wood family, headed by Obadiah Wood (1753-1849) and his son Edmond Wood (1791-1865), from Greenville, South Carolina. The site they chose was a well-watered section of Jones Valley along the Georgia Road which extended deep into what was then still part of the Mississippi Territory.

Edmund was granted 1200 acres (5 km^{2}) of Obadiah's holdings on which to raise his family. It was on that property that the town of Rockville was formed in 1832 - a small cluster of houses near the roadside. The first railway came through the valley in 1870, at which point the settlement was renamed Wood Station and began to grow. By the end of that decade a private "Woodlawn Academy" had been founded to educate the children of the communities' 89 residents. In 1884 the Georgia Pacific Railway began offering service into the rapidly growing city of Birmingham, about 4 miles to the west.

In 1891 the State of Alabama granted a municipal corporation to the "City of Woodlawn," the name chosen by its first citizens to honor the Wood family, who remained active in civic affairs. In 1895 the first City Hall and Jail were built and by the end of the century the population was 2,500. A second, larger City Hall was built at the turn of the century, along with schools, churches, a fire station, and library. The grand Gothic-inspired Woodlawn High School opened in 1922.

In 1910 the City of Woodlawn was annexed into Birmingham, but maintained a strong community spirit that was bound up with the Wood family, who had turned their estate into a public park (now "Willow Wood Park"), complete with spring-fed swimming pool. Commentators through the first half of the 20th century never tired of remarking on the local pride found in Woodlawn - "a really great section of Birmingham...A section typical of the fine things in life." (according to one newspaper story from 1950)

== Demographics ==
Historical population
Census	Pop.	Note	%±
1890	1,506		—
1900	2,848		89.1%

Woodlawn appeared on the 1890 and 1900 U.S. Censuses as an incorporated town. It was formally annexed into the City of Birmingham in 1910.

== Current status ==
Within the city of Birmingham, greater Woodlawn is characterized as one of 23 "Communities" that participate in the "Community Participation Program" that was drawn up to encourage local political activism and community development. The neighborhoods that make up the Woodlawn community are East Avondale, Oak Ridge Park, South Woodlawn, and the Woodlawn neighborhood itself.

In the last few years, residents of Woodlawn have worked with the City and Region 2020 to create a master plan as part of Birmingham's "Comprehensive Master Plan" process. An initial project to implement master plan goals in the central residential section of Woodlawn, north of 1st Avenue, has met with limited success. Several dilapidated houses were improved and an active community garden was started.

The business district of Woodlawn, and Woodlawn High School, both critical assets, remain at risk of not recovering from decline.

Recently, attention has turned back to the business district of Woodlawn. REV Birmingham and the Woodlawn Foundation have taken center stage revitalizing businesses and housing, making this the new hot neighborhood in Birmingham. Recently opened high end boutique businesses are calling this neighborhood home. There are also three new public murals.

Woodlawn is currently home to one of two Hackerspaces in Alabama. Red Mountain Makers. The other being Makers Local 256 in Huntsville.

== Famous residents ==
- Bobby Bowden was a star quarterback at Woodlawn High School before going on to coach football at Howard (now Samford) University and Florida State University.
- Miami Dolphins running back Tony Nathan attended Woodlawn High School and played for Paul "Bear" Bryant at the University of Alabama
- Actress Lili Gentle, wife of Richard D. Zanuck from 1958 to 1968.
- Author Paul Hemphill ("Leaving Birmingham")
- Dyer Talley (1865—?), Surgeon
