= National Register of Historic Places listings in Calhoun County, Alabama =

Location of Calhoun County in Alabama

This is a list of the National Register of Historic Places listings in Calhoun County, Alabama.

This is intended to be a complete list of the properties and districts on the National Register of Historic Places in Calhoun County, Alabama, United States. Latitude and longitude coordinates are provided for many National Register properties and districts; these locations may be seen together in an online map.

There are 60 properties and districts listed on the National Register in the county, and two former listings.

This National Park Service list is complete through NPS recent listings posted May 1, 2026.

== Current listings ==
| | Name on the Register | Image | Date listed | Location | City or town | Description |
|---|---|---|---|---|---|---|
| 1 | Aderholdt's Mill | Aderholdt's Mill | December 29, 1988 (#88003077) | Aderholdt's Mill Rd. 33°46′40″N 85°46′12″W | Jacksonville | |
| 2 | Anniston Cotton Manufacturing Company | Anniston Cotton Manufacturing Company | October 3, 1985 (#85002739) | 215 W. 11th St. 33°39′34″N 85°50′06″W | Anniston | Demolished as of April 2014, now site of the Calhoun County Human Resources Department |
| 3 | Anniston Inn Kitchen | Anniston Inn Kitchen | May 8, 1973 (#73000332) | 130 W. 15th St. 33°39′48″N 85°49′57″W | Anniston | |
| 4 | Anniston Transfer Company | Anniston Transfer Company | October 3, 1985 (#85002740) | 911 Wilmer Ave. 33°39′22″N 85°49′41″W | Anniston | Demolished as of April 2014 |
| 5 | Bagley-Cater Building | Bagley-Cater Building | October 3, 1985 (#85002864) | 15 E. 10th St. 33°39′26″N 85°49′45″W | Anniston | |
| 6 | Bank of Anniston | Bank of Anniston | October 3, 1985 (#85002865) | 1005 Noble St. 33°39′25″N 85°49′46″W | Anniston | |
| 7 | Caldwell Building | Caldwell Building | March 1, 1982 (#82001997) | 1001 Noble St. 33°39′25″N 85°49′46″W | Anniston | |
| 8 | Calhoun County Courthouse | Calhoun County Courthouse | October 3, 1985 (#85002866) | 25 W. 11th St. 33°39′30″N 85°49′52″W | Anniston | |
| 9 | Coldwater Creek Covered Bridge | Coldwater Creek Covered Bridge | April 11, 1973 (#73000333) | Oxford Lake; 33°36′27″N 85°49′00″W | Oxford | Originally spanned Coldwater Creek 0.5 miles (0.8 km) from Interstate 20; moved to current location in 1990. |
| 10 | Davis C. Cooper House | Davis C. Cooper House | August 12, 2005 (#05000835) | 301 Main St. 33°37′01″N 85°50′03″W | Oxford | |
| 11 | Crowan Cottage | Crowan Cottage | May 16, 1975 (#75000307) | 1401 Woodstock Ave. 33°39′44″N 85°49′12″W | Anniston | |
| 12 | Downtown Anniston Historic District | Downtown Anniston Historic District | May 30, 1991 (#91000663) | Roughly bounded by Moore Ave., 14th St., Wilmer Ave., and 9th St.; also bounded by Wilmer & Walnut Aves., W. 9th & 14th Sts.; also 20, 101, 227 14th St. West, 130, 216, 230 15th St. West; 33°39′29″N 85°49′52″W | Anniston | Boundary adjustments were approved on May 24, 2010 and November 14, 2024. |
| 13 | Downtown Jacksonville Historic District | Downtown Jacksonville Historic District | May 13, 1986 (#86001044) | Roughly bounded by College, Thomas, Coffee, and Spring Sts. 33°48′47″N 85°45′36″W | Jacksonville | |
| 14 | East Anniston Residential Historic District | East Anniston Residential Historic District | May 28, 1993 (#93000418) | Roughly along Leighton and Christine Aves. from 11th St. to 22nd Sts. and Woodstock Ave. from 11th St. to Rocky Hollow; 33°39′51″N 85°49′21″W | Anniston | |
| 15 | First Presbyterian Church | First Presbyterian Church | February 4, 1982 (#82001999) | 200 E. Clinton St. 33°48′52″N 85°45′37″W | Jacksonville | |
| 16 | Fort McClellan Ammunition Storage Historic District | Fort McClellan Ammunition Storage Historic District | November 8, 2006 (#06000981) | Pappy Dunn Boulevard; 33°43′40″N 85°46′37″W | Anniston | |
| 17 | Fort McClellan Industrial Historic District | Fort McClellan Industrial Historic District | November 8, 2006 (#06000982) | Jimmy Parks Boulevard, Transportation Rd., Idaho Ave. 33°43′04″N 85°47′25″W | Anniston | |
| 18 | Fort McClellan Post Headquarters Historic District | Fort McClellan Post Headquarters Historic District | November 8, 2006 (#06000983) | Buckner Circle, Headquarters Ave., Drennan Dr. 33°43′01″N 85°47′47″W | Anniston | |
| 19 | Dr. J.C. Francis Office | Dr. J.C. Francis Office | November 20, 1970 (#70000100) | 100 Gayle St. 33°48′51″N 85°45′43″W | Jacksonville | |
| 20 | Glen Addie Volunteer Hose Company Fire Hall | Glen Addie Volunteer Hose Company Fire Hall | October 3, 1985 (#85002738) | Fourth St. and Pine Ave. 33°38′55″N 85°50′12″W | Anniston | |
| 21 | Glenwood Terrace Residential Historic District | Glenwood Terrace Residential Historic District | October 3, 1985 (#85002867) | Roughly bounded by Oak St., Jefferson Ave., lots on the southern side of Glenwood Terrace, the northern side of Orchard St., and Highland Ave. 33°39′16″N 85°49′01″W | Anniston | |
| 22 | Henry Burt Glover House | Henry Burt Glover House | October 3, 1985 (#85002868) | 1119 Leighton Ave. 33°39′32″N 85°49′29″W | Anniston | |
| 23 | Grace Episcopal Church | Grace Episcopal Church | October 3, 1985 (#85002869) | 1000 Leighton Ave. 33°39′27″N 85°49′31″W | Anniston | |
| 24 | Greenwood | Greenwood | March 9, 1989 (#89000162) | Junction of Old Anniston-Gadsden Rd. and County Road 25; 33°46′21″N 85°52′48″W | Alexandria | |
| 25 | Charles B. Henry Barn | Charles B. Henry Barn | September 26, 1997 (#97001168) | 0.5 miles west of State Route 21, south of Branscomb Dr. and north of Henry Rd. 33°47′12″N 85°46′01″W | Jacksonville | |
| 26 | Hillside Cemetery | Hillside Cemetery | October 3, 1985 (#85002870) | Highland Ave. between 10th and 11th Sts. 33°39′27″N 85°49′04″W | Anniston | |
| 27 | Richard P. Huger House | Richard P. Huger House | October 3, 1985 (#85002871) | 1901 Wilmer Ave. 33°40′08″N 85°49′41″W | Anniston | |
| 28 | Janney Furnace | Janney Furnace | September 28, 1976 (#76000315) | 1 mile northwest of Ohatchee off State Route 62; 33°47′41″N 86°01′14″W | Ohatchee | |
| 29 | Kilby House | Kilby House | October 3, 1985 (#85002872) | 1301 Woodstock Ave. 33°39′36″N 85°49′13″W | Anniston | |
| 30 | Kress Building | Kress Building | October 3, 1985 (#85002873) | 1106 Noble St. 33°39′31″N 85°49′48″W | Anniston | |
| 31 | Lyric Theatre | Lyric Theatre | May 22, 1980 (#80000681) | 1302 Noble St. 33°39′40″N 85°49′49″W | Anniston | |
| 32 | McKleroy-Wilson-Kirby House | McKleroy-Wilson-Kirby House | August 30, 1984 (#84000597) | 1604 Quintard Ave. 33°39′55″N 85°49′39″W | Anniston | |
| 33 | Montgomery Ward-Alabama Power Company Building | Montgomery Ward-Alabama Power Company Building | October 3, 1985 (#85002874) | 1201 Noble St. 33°39′35″N 85°49′46″W | Anniston | |
| 34 | Mount Zion Baptist Church | Mount Zion Baptist Church | October 3, 1985 (#85002875) | 212 2nd St. 33°38′47″N 85°49′58″W | Anniston | |
| 35 | Noble Cottage | Noble Cottage | October 8, 1976 (#76000313) | 900 Leighton Ave. 33°39′20″N 85°49′31″W | Anniston | |
| 36 | Samuel Noble Monument | Samuel Noble Monument | October 3, 1985 (#85002876) | 11th St. and Quintard Ave. 33°39′29″N 85°49′36″W | Anniston | |
| 37 | Noble-McCaa-Butler House | Noble-McCaa-Butler House | October 3, 1985 (#85002877) | 1025 Fairmont Ave. 33°39′28″N 85°49′11″W | Anniston | |
| 38 | Nonnenmacher Bakery | Nonnenmacher Bakery | October 3, 1985 (#85002878) | 36 W. 11th St. 33°39′28″N 85°49′52″W | Anniston | |
| 39 | Nonnenmacher House | Nonnenmacher House | October 3, 1985 (#85002879) | 1311 Gurnee Ave. 33°39′41″N 85°49′52″W | Anniston | |
| 40 | Oak Tree Cottage | Oak Tree Cottage | October 3, 1985 (#85002880) | 721 Oak St. 33°39′18″N 85°49′08″W | Anniston | |
| 41 | Old Anniston Electric and Gas Company Plant | Old Anniston Electric and Gas Company Plant | May 16, 1991 (#91000611) | 2 W. 3rd St. 33°38′50″N 85°49′47″W | Anniston | Demolished as of April 2014 |
| 42 | Oxford Railway Depot | | June 18, 2025 (#100011947) | 50 Spring Street; 33°36′51″N 85°50′09″W | Oxford | |
| 43 | Parker Memorial Baptist Church | Parker Memorial Baptist Church | October 3, 1985 (#85002881) | 1205 Quintard Ave. 33°39′36″N 85°49′34″W | Anniston | |
| 44 | Parker-Reynolds House | Parker-Reynolds House | February 19, 1982 (#82001998) | 330 E. 6th St. 33°39′36″N 85°49′34″W | Anniston | |
| 45 | Peerless Saloon | Peerless Saloon | October 3, 1985 (#85002882) | 13 W. 10th St. 33°39′25″N 85°49′51″W | Anniston | |
| 46 | The Pines | The Pines | May 13, 1991 (#91000594) | Southeastern corner of 5th St. and Lapsley Ave. 33°38′59″N 85°49′21″W | Anniston | Demolished as of April 2014 |
| 47 | Profile Cotton Mills Historic District | Profile Cotton Mills Historic District | May 31, 2006 (#06000436) | Alexandria St., A St., H St., and D St. 33°48′44″N 85°46′21″W | Jacksonville | |
| 48 | St. Michael and All Angels Episcopal Church | St. Michael and All Angels Episcopal Church | February 14, 1978 (#78000483) | W. 18th St. 33°40′00″N 85°50′36″W | Anniston | |
| 49 | Saint Paul's Methodist Episcopal Church | Saint Paul's Methodist Episcopal Church | October 3, 1985 (#85002884) | 1327 Leighton Ave. 33°39′40″N 85°49′29″W | Anniston | |
| 50 | Security Bank Building | Security Bank Building | October 3, 1985 (#85002885) | 1030 Noble St. 33°39′28″N 85°49′47″W | Anniston | |
| 51 | Lansing T. Smith House | Lansing T. Smith House | October 3, 1985 (#85002886) | 531 Keith Ave. 33°39′04″N 85°50′28″W | Anniston | |
| 52 | Southern Railway Depot | Southern Railway Depot | January 5, 1984 (#84000599) | 200 N. Center Ave. 33°55′29″N 85°36′40″W | Piedmont | |
| 53 | Temple Beth-El | Temple Beth-El | October 3, 1985 (#85002887) | 301 E. 13th St. 33°39′40″N 85°49′33″W | Anniston | |
| 54 | Ten Oaks | Ten Oaks | November 29, 2001 (#01001298) | 805 Pelham Rd., S. 33°48′32″N 85°45′44″W | Jacksonville | |
| 55 | Tyler Hill Residential Historic District | Tyler Hill Residential Historic District | October 3, 1985 (#85002888) | Roughly bounded by E. 7th, Knox and Goodwin and Lapsley Aves., E. 6th St., and Leighton Ave. 33°39′05″N 85°49′24″W | Anniston | |
| 56 | U.S. Post Office | U.S. Post Office | November 13, 1976 (#76000314) | 1129 Noble St. 33°39′33″N 85°49′45″W | Anniston | |
| 57 | Union Depot and Freight House | Union Depot and Freight House | October 3, 1985 (#85002889) | 1300 Walnut Ave. 33°39′39″N 85°50′01″W | Anniston | |
| 58 | West Fifteenth Street Historic District | West Fifteenth Street Historic District | May 30, 1991 (#91000662) | 416-712 W. 15th St. 33°39′48″N 85°50′13″W | Anniston | |
| 59 | Wikle Drug Company | Wikle Drug Company | October 3, 1985 (#85002890) | 1010 Noble St. 33°39′25″N 85°49′47″W | Anniston | |
| 60 | Alexander Woods House | Alexander Woods House | March 15, 1988 (#87001651) | 517 N. Pelham Rd. 33°49′13″N 85°45′40″W | Jacksonville | |

== Former listings ==
| | Name on the Register | Image | Date listed | Date removed | Location | City or town | Description |
|---|---|---|---|---|---|---|---|
| 1 | Fort McClellan World War II Housing Historic District | Fort McClellan World War II Housing Historic District | November 8, 2006 (#06000984) | October 10, 2023 | Berman Rd., Bachelor Dr., Iron Mountain Rd., and Micron Way; 33°43′12″N 85°46′36″W | Anniston | |
| 2 | Rollstone Machinery Company | | October 3, 1985 (#85002883) | August 20, 1990 | 300 W. Fifteenth St. | Anniston | |

== See also ==
- List of National Historic Landmarks in Alabama
- National Register of Historic Places listings in Alabama
