= Properties on the Alabama Register of Landmarks and Heritage by county (Autauga–Choctaw) =

This is a list of properties on the Alabama Register of Landmarks and Heritage, sorted alphabetically by county. This list contains all entries for Autauga County through Choctaw County, the other listings may be found here. The Alabama Register of Landmarks and Heritage is an official listing of buildings, sites, structures, objects, and districts deemed worthy of preservation in the U.S. state of Alabama.

These properties, which may be of national, state, and local significance, are designated by the Alabama Historical Commission, under the authority of the Alabama Legislature. General criteria for inclusion in the Alabama Register includes that the property is at least 40 years old; is associated with events of state or local significance; is associated with the lives of persons of state or local significance; is representative of a type, style, or period of architecture; or is associated with Alabama's history or prehistory. It must also possess integrity of location and construction and convey a feeling for the time and place of construction.

The Alabama Register occasionally includes properties that do not meet the general criteria for inclusion, such as moved or reconstructed structures. These properties are included when they have been sensitively relocated to a site similar to the original, closely match the construction of the original significant building, or are of exceptional importance to the state.

There are approximately 1,711 properties and districts listed on the Alabama Register. Of these, approximately 243 are also listed on the National Register of Historic Places (NRHP) and 6 are designated as National Historic Landmarks (NHL).

Autauga – Baldwin – Barbour – Bibb – Blount – Bullock – Butler – Calhoun – Chambers – Cherokee – Chilton – Choctaw – See also – References

This list is complete through the most recent Alabama Historical Commission listings, posted January 8, 2025.

== Autauga County ==
	Site name	Date listed	City or Town	Built or Established	NRHP/NHL
1	Autaugaville Historic District	October 7, 1998	Autaugaville	c. 1840s–1949	
2	Bell House	October 7, 1998	Prattville	c. 1893	NRHP
3	First Missionary Baptist Church	March 24, 2022	Prattville	1855	
4	Gin Shop Hill Water Tank	January 31, 1978	Prattville	c. 1900	
5	Ivy Creek Methodist Church and Cemetery	June 27, 2019	Autaugaville	1854	
6	Billy Johnson Place	July 29, 1992	Deatsville	c. 1888	
7	Johnson-Rawlinson House	October 4, 1996	Marbury vicinity	c. 1867–1870	
8	Lamar Estate Family Home and Statesville School Site	February 4, 2000	Mulberry vicinity	c. 1920	
9	Lassiter-Treadwell House	July 22, 1991	Autaugaville	c. 1820	NRHP
10	Mount Sinai School	February 2, 2001	Prattville	1919	NRHP
11	Old Mulberry Schoolhouse	September 16, 2021	Autaugaville	c. 1895	
12	Pine Flat Presbyterian Church & Cemetery	March 29, 2018	Deatsville	c. 1871	
13	Pine Level Cultural Center	September 26, 2007	Pine Level	c. 1929	
14	Posey House	June 29, 1976	Prattville	c. 1840	
15	Daniel Pratt Cemetery	September 14, 1977	Prattville	1849–1886	
16	Daniel Pratt Farm Gin	March 29, 1977	Prattville	1844	
17	Rawlinson Grist Mill	October 28, 1977	Autaugaville	c. 1875	
18	Rawlinson Grist Mill Machinery	March 10, 1978	Autaugaville	Estimated 1900	
19	Vine Hill Presbyterian Church	September 16, 2021	Plantersville	1889	

== Baldwin County ==
	Site name	Date listed	City or Town	Built or Established	NRHP/NHL
1	Anna T. Jeanes School	May 13, 2024	Fairhope	c. 1908	
2	Thomas Atkinson House	April 19, 2006	Tensaw vicinity	c. 1840	
3	Baldwin County Training School Historic District	March 24, 2022	Daphne	1919–1990	
4	Bayside Academy	May 27, 1975	Daphne	c. 1838	
5	Bromley School / James E. Cook Memorial Presbyterian Chapel & Cemetery	October 13, 2013	Spanish Fort vicinity	c. 1920 (altered 1940s)	
6	Chambless-Biggs House	June 30, 1995	Tensaw vicinity	c. 1896	
7	Church of the Sacred Heart	March 22, 1991	Fairhope	1876, 1916	
8	Concrete Water Tower	June 24, 2004	Bay Minette	1915	
9	D'Olive Plantation Site	April 19, 2006	Daphne	Prehistoric – 1880	
10	Fairhope Friends Meetinghouse of the Religious Society of Friends (Quaker)	May 13, 2024	Fairhope	c. 1917	
11	Fairhope Museum of History	May 28, 2009	Fairhope	1928	
12	Fort McDermott	March 29, 2018	Spanish Fort	c. 1864	
13	Gulf State Park Contact Station	June 23, 2016	Gulf Shores	c. 1941	
14	Gulf Shores Tourist Information Center	May 11, 2017	Gulf Shores	c. 1966–1972	
15	L & N Railroad Depot	July 7, 1980	Bay Minette	c. 1911	
16	Little Bethel Baptist Church	November 3, 1986	Daphne	c. 1867	
17	Malbis Church	November 30, 1977	Malbis	c. 1965	
18	Malbis Plantation Historic District	September 25, 2008	Malbis	c. 1906	
19	Manci’s Antique Club	August 6, 2024	Daphne	c. 1924	
20	McNair House (Sunnyside Hotel)	May 11, 1983	Magnolia Springs	c. 1897	NRHP
21	Mitchell Store	August 6, 2024	Fairhope	c. 1960	
22	Montrose Historic District	July 30, 1975	Montrose	c. 1853-1975	NRHP
23	Nancy Lewis Home	August 24, 2022	Fairhope	1900, 1950, c. 1980	
24	Charles M. Nelson House	May 22, 2008	Fairhope	c. 1898	
25	Old English Place (Atkinson-Till Place)	March 14, 1978	Stockton	c. 1835	
26	Old Loxley Hotel	December 15, 2011	Loxley	c. 1905	
27	People's Supply Company	March 13, 1996	Silverhill	1902	NRHP
28	Pinewood Pottery Kiln	July 6, 1976	Fairhope	c. 1939	
29	Pilot Town Archaeological District	September 16, 2021	Fort Morgan	early to mid-20th century	
30	Rhodes Store	February 10, 1976	Bay Minette	c. 1890	
31	Rosinton School (Demolished)	May 19, 1999	Robertsdale	1919	
32	St. Francis at the Point Traditional Episcopal Church	October 1, 1997	Point Clear	1898	
33	St. Andrews by the Sea	December 19, 2019	Perdido Beach	c. 1911	
34	Strong-Meador House	June 10, 1982	Daphne	c. 1858	
35	Swift-Coles House	October 6, 1978	Bon Secour	c. 1900	
36	U.S. Post Office	August 13, 1987	Bay Minette	1937–1939	
37	The Apalachee Batteries	May 13, 2024	Address restricted	c. 1838	
38	The Grand Hotel	September 12, 2017	Point Clear	c. 1945	

== Barbour County ==
	Site name	Date listed	City or Town	Built or Established	NRHP/NHL
1	Askew-Robinson House	December 19, 2019	Eufaula	c. 1898	
2	Clayton Presbyterian Church	March 20, 1981	Clayton	c. 1879	
3	Copeland-Reeves House	April 16, 1985	Eufaula	c. 1886	
4	Eufaula High School Auditorium	April 11, 1984	Eufaula	20th century	
5	Fenn-Boyd House	April 11, 1984	Clayton	c. 1840	
6	Faulk Methodist Church and Cemetery	August 18, 2022	Brundidge	1843, 1935	
7	Jones Chapel AME Church	May 19, 2023	Clayton	c. 1904	
8	Joyce-Copeland-Reeves House	April 16, 1985	Eufaula	c. 1851	
9	Kendall-Edmondson-Hallenbeck House	May 25, 1976	Eufaula	c. 1860	
10	McLeroy-Calton-Hurlbert House	April 11, 1984	Eufaula	c. 1882	
11	McGee Home	October 1, 1997	Baker Hill	1873	
12	Ramah Baptist Church	December 15, 2011	Midway	c. 1840s	
13	Rebecca Comer High School	May 13, 2024	Eufaula	c. 1937	
14	Turner-Hightower Farm	July 6, 1978	Clayton	c. 1859	
15	Wallace Home (Burned down in 1980s)	August 14, 1975	Clayton	c. 1897	
16	Woodlane	December 15, 1989	Eufaula	1852	NRHP

== Bibb County ==
	Site name	Date listed	City or Town	Built or Established	NRHP/NHL
1	Bibb County Training School	November 6, 1975	Centreville	c. 1889	
2	Brierfield Coal & Iron Company Superintendent’s House (moved to present site 2010)	December 16, 2010	Brierfield	c. 1882/1887	
3	Fuller–Williams House	June 18, 2015	Centreville	c. 1940	
4	Green Pond Presbyterian Church and Cemetery	February 25, 1999	Green Pond	1884	
5	Howard-Cooper-Cleveland House (The Oaks)	October 13, 2013	Centreville	c. 1837	
6	James Wallace Mason House	February 6, 1998	Brent	c. 1889	
7	Old Bibb County High School (Destroyed by fire 2008)	July 29, 1977	Centreville	c. 1908	
8	Pondville School House	March 8, 2023	Brent	c. 1900	
9	Sandy Chapel Methodist Church	March 29, 1977	Centreville	c. 1910	
10	Vance-Ellison House	November 16, 1978	Centreville	c. 1899	
11	West Blocton Commercial Historic District	January 24, 2008	West Blocton	c. 1922–1928	
12	Woodstock United Methodist Church	July 22, 1991	Woodstock	c. 1893	

== Blount County ==
	Site name	Date listed	City or Town	Built or Established	NRHP/NHL
1	Bangor United Methodist Church	March 20, 2003	Garden City	1930	
2	Barclift Inn	January 24, 2008	Blountsville	c. 1834	
3	Berry Mountain School	October 7, 1998	Rosa vicinity	c. 1921	
4	Blount County Activity Building	July 22, 1991	Oneonta	1940	
5	Blountsville Baptist Church	January 24, 2008	Blountsville	c. 1956	
6	Blountsville Methodist Church	November 13, 1978	Blountsville	c. 1886	
7	Copeland-Ellis House	July 21, 1978	Oneonta	c. 1914	
8	Crump-Oliver Farm	October 11, 1978	Oneonta	c. 1841	
9	Denton-Hendrix House	January 31, 1979	Oneonta	c. 1917	
10	Dallas Loop Road Historic District	March 18, 2021	Trafford	1866-1975	
11	Griffith House	June 30, 1995	Guntersville	1851	NRHP
12	A.L. Head House	January 24, 2008	Blountsville	c. 1890	
13	Holland Farm	July 29, 1977	Horton	c. 1891	
14	Masonic Hall	January 24, 2008	Blountsville	c. 1933	
15	Murphree Log Cabin	July 6, 1978	Oneonta	c. 1819	
16	Thomas Nation House	May 19, 1998	Blountsville	c. 1835	
17	Old Easley Covered Bridge	March 3, 1976	Rosa	c. 1927	NRHP
18	Old Tennessee Pike	September 3, 2020	Trafford	c. 1900	
19	Oneonta Community House	August 3, 1990	Oneonta	1934	
20	Oneonta Federal Building	August 25, 1994	Oneonta	1937–1938	
21	J.B. Pennington High School Gymnasium	January 24, 2008	Blountsville	c. 1939	
22	Ratliff Building	January 24, 2008	Blountsville	c. 1939	
23	Stracener Bridge	May 17, 1977	Snead	c. early 1900	
24	Warren House Complex	November 2, 1990	Blountsville	Mid–19th century	
25	Warren Springs Petroglyphs	February 20, 1986	Blountsville	Prehistoric	

== Bullock County ==
	Site name	Date listed	City or Town	Built or Established	NRHP/NHL
1	Aberfoil School	March 24, 2005	Union Springs	1945	
2	Chunnenugee Ridge	March 5, 1976	Union Springs	c. 1840s-50s	
3	First Baptist Church	December 4, 1992	Midway	1912	
4	Fitzpatrick United Methodist Church	June 20, 1978	Fitzpatrick	c. 1858	
5	Foster-Bryan-Brown House	September 14, 1977	Union Springs	c. 1852–1856	NRHP
6	Dr. S.N. Hogan House	May 19, 1998	Union Springs	c. 1871–84	
7	Hunter-Anderson House	January 14, 1980	Union Springs	c. 1843	
8	Hunter House	March 30, 1989	Union Springs	c. 1860	
9	Kennon-Paulk-Shanks House	October 20, 1977	Union Springs	c. 1860	
10	L.M. Moseley (The Homespun)	May 10, 2000	Union Springs	1910	
11	Memory Chapel Funeral Home (Poe's Memory Chapel)	February 20, 2014	Union Springs	c. 1910	
12	Mt. Hilliard Methodist Church	August 6, 1976	Union Springs	c. 1856	
13	Old Fitzpatrick Baptist Church	September 25, 2008	Fitzpatrick	c. 1870s	
14	Old Fitzpatrick Post Office	September 25, 2008	Fitzpatrick	c. 1908	
15	Old Merritt School	November 2, 1990	Midway	1921	NRHP
16	Old Parsonage for the United Methodist Church	December 19, 1991	Midway	1888	
17	Old Union Church	August 14, 1975	Union Springs	c. 1835	
18	Paulk House	November 16, 2024	Union Springs	c. 1923	
19	Sterling Price Ranier House	April 1, 2010	Union Springs	c. 1902	
20	Samuel Sellers Cemetery	October 7, 1998	Perote	Graves 1856–1931	
21	Sardis Baptist Church	December 19, 1991	Union Springs	1847	NRHP
22	St. James C.M.E. Church	December 19, 1991	Midway	1883	
23	The "Yellow House"	November 13, 1996	Union Springs	c. 1855	
24	Town Creek Missionary Baptist Church	March 29, 2012	Union Springs	c. 1834	

== Butler County ==
	Site name	Date listed	City or Town	Built or Established	NRHP/NHL
1	Bartram's Trail	May 12, 1976	Greenville vicinity	c. 1776	
2	Butler Chapel A.M.E. Zion Church	January 31, 1979	Greenville	c. 1867	NRHP
3	William Carter Home (Pine Flat Plantation)	March 8, 1994	Pine Flat	c. 1825–1830	
4	Clive Shell Farm	December 15, 2011	Chapman	c. 1890s, 1930s	
5	Coleman-Crenshaw House	March 24, 2005	Greenville vicinity	c. 1815	
6	Corry-Morton House	October 19, 1979	Greenville	c. mid–1850s	
7	Dr Pepper Bottling Plant	November 15, 2012	Georgiana	c. 1920	
8	First Presbyterian Church	March 29, 1977	Greenville	c. 1886	NRHP
9	Fort Dale Cemetery	January 29, 1980	Greenville vicinity	Graves to 1818	
10	Fort Dale Street Historic District	March 20, 1980	Greenville	1850–1930s	
11	Gafford-Hartley-Mullins House	October 7, 1998	Greenville vicinity	c. 1865	
12	Georgiana Opry House	November 16, 2024	Georgiana	c. January 31, 1939	
13	Hawkins' Quarters	March 13, 1996	Forest Home vicinity	1878–1911	
14	Henry-Beeland-Stanley House	September 20, 1978	Greenville		
15	Howard-Raybon House	September 2, 1982	Greenville	c. 1860	NRHP
16	Liberty Chapel Church	February 27, 1978	Greenville vicinity	c. 1858	
17	Lomax-Hannon Junior College	March 29, 1977	Greenville	c. 1911	NRHP
18	Magnolia Manor	October 26, 1978	Greenville	c. 1870	
19	Julian and Betty McGowin House	March 7, 2002	Georgiana vicinity	1950	
20	McKenzie High School	April 1, 2010	McKenzie	c. 1929–1931	
21	Milner-Boone House	March 25, 2004	Georgiana	c. 1858	
22	Milner-Speir-Moody Home	January 25, 1977	Greenville	c. 1848	
23	Mount Zion School	March 24, 1995	Greenville	1934	
24	Oak Grove Methodist Church	January 29, 1980	Greenville vicinity	c. 1872	
25	Oak Lawn Farm	March 29, 2012	Greenville	c. 1870	
26	Oakey Streak Methodist Church	June 9, 1977	Greenville vicinity	c. 1875	NRHP
27	Old Abrams Place	May 12, 1976	Greenville	c. 1859–1860	
28	Old Fort Dale Site	January 29, 1980	Greenville vicinity	c. 1818	
29	Old Log Barn	January 29, 1980	Greenville vicinity	c. 1825	
30	Overhead Pedestrian Bridge	September 12, 2019	Georgiana	c. 1895	
31	Pine Flat Methodist Church	July 6, 1978	Pine Flat	c. 1858	
32	Pioneer Cemetery	November 23, 1976	Greenville	1821-1961	
33	Major Edward Preston Price House	October 7, 2008	Forest Home vicinity	Mid-19th Century	
34	Searcy School	April 18, 2007	Greenville vicinity	1922	
35	Steiner House	July 28, 1978	Greenville	c. 1886	
36	Thaggard-Poole House	October 19, 1979	Greenville	c. 1860s	
37	J.C. Watson House (Watson Hospital)	November 5, 1984	Georgiana	c. 1913	
38	Hank Williams, Sr. Boyhood Home	July 22, 1991	Georgiana	1910	

== Calhoun County ==
	Site name	Date listed	City or Town	Built or Established	NRHP/NHL
1	Antebella	April 11, 1984	Alexandria	c. 1822	
2	Barry Manor Apartments	November 9, 2017	Anniston	c. 1965	
3	Bibb Graves Hall	March 1, 2024	Jacksonville	c. 1930-1980	
4	Blue Spring Mill	December 15, 1997	Oxford	1885	
5	Borders House (Destroyed by fire 2007)	May 19, 1998	Anniston	c. 1840	
6	Caldwell House	March 13, 1996	Jacksonville	1860	
7	Calhoun County-Oxford High School Football Stadium	May 10, 2000	Oxford	1935	
8	Camwood (Noble-Woodruff House)	April 18, 2007	Anniston	c. 1882	
9	Calhoun-Barnwell-Cole House	March 24, 1995	Anniston	1837–1842	
10	Choccolocco School	March 13, 1996	Choccolocco	1876	
11	Z.H. Clardy House	October 7, 1998	Oxford	c. 1880	
12	Davis C. Cooper House	September 26, 2003	Oxford	c. 1911	NRHP
13	Eastwood High School	March 29, 2012	Jacksonville	c. 1940	
14	Fain-Webb House	April 1, 2010	Piedmont	c. 1921	
15	Friendship Missionary Baptist Church (Demolished)	February 6, 1998	Anniston	c. 1923	
16	Gaines Chapel African Methodist Episcopal Church	February 25, 1999	Anniston	1895	
17	Greenwood	April 23, 1987	Alexandria	c. 1842–1850	NRHP
18	Gunnells-Wingo House	August 22, 1985	Oxford	c. 1860–1870	
19	C.E. Hanna School (Old Calhoun County Training School)	September 25, 2008	Hobson City	Mid-19th Century	
20	C. B. Henry Barn	March 24, 1995	Jacksonville	c. 1910	NRHP
21	Jackson House (Haven Church Parsonage)	October 7, 1998	Anniston	1909–1910	
22	Kilby House	October 3, 1985	Anniston	c. 1917	NRHP
23	LeGarde Properties (McMillan Terrace Apartments, LaGarde Apartments, Berry Manor)	c. 2006	Anniston	1945-1964	
24	Lyric Theatre	August 6, 1976	Anniston	c. 1918	NRHP
25	Mallory-Scarborough-Prather House	July 5, 1983	Choccolocco vicinity	1840s	
26	Oxford Historic District	March 29, 2018	Oxford	1875–1978	
27	Parker Memorial Baptist Church	September 24, 1981	Anniston	c. 1888	NRHP
28	Patillo House	September 7, 1984	Oxford	c. 1864	
29	Pelham-Bush Cemetery	October 1, 1997	Alexandria vicinity	1853	
30	Pot of Manna Lodge No. 478 (partially demolished)	May 28, 2009	Anniston	c. 1910	
31	Quintard Avenue Median	April 14, 1992	Anniston	Late 1870s	
32	Rhodes Place (Amity's Place)	March 23, 1990	Anniston	c. 1906	
33	The Rice Home	October 25, 2018	Anniston	1925	
34	William Sherman Rivers House	December 16, 2010	Anniston	c. 1905	
35	Roberts Home	June 27, 2019	Piedmont	1880	
36	Saint John United Methodist Church	December 1, 2016	Anniston	c. 1951	
37	Saint Luke's Episcopal Church	March 4, 1976	Jacksonville	c. 1856	
38	Saint Michael and All Angels Episcopal Church	November 23, 1976	Anniston	c. 1888	NRHP
39	Smith-Mallory-Cater House (Lansing T. Smith)	April 29, 1983	Anniston	c. 1891	NRHP
40	Southern Railroad Depot	May 27, 1983	Piedmont	c. 1868	NRHP
41	Union Grove Cemetery	July 18, 1989	Anniston	c. 1865	
42	White Plains United Methodist Church	February 21, 2013	Choccolocco	c. 1938	
43	Margaret Woodruff Library	February 20, 1986	Alexandria	c. 1915	
44	Woods-Crook-Treadaway House	January 14, 1982	Jacksonville	c. 1836	NRHP

== Chambers County ==
	Site name	Date listed	City or Town	Built or Established	NRHP/NHL
1	Chambers County Courthouse Square	June 9, 1976	LaFayette	c. 1899	NRHP
2	Chambers County Training School	August 24, 2022	LaFayette	1949; 1954-1976	
3	County Line Baptist Church	January 14, 1980	Dudleyville	c. 1899	NRHP
4	Fairfax Mill Village Historic District	December 19, 1991	Valley	1915	NRHP
5	Fuller-Crowder House	April 23, 1983	LaFayette	c. 1910	
6	Griggs-Simmons House	June 16, 1976	Lanett	c. 1858	
7	Harmon Farmhouse	August 25, 2011	Welch	c. 1875	
8	Harmony Methodist Church	February 2, 2001	LaFayette vicinity	Mid-to-late 19th century	
9	Heflin-Callahan House	June 9, 1976	LaFayette	c. 1912	
10	Charlie F. Higgins Farmhouse	August 25, 2011	Five Points	c. 1898	
11	Homeland (Boykin Place) (demolished)	February 19, 1988	Lanett	1840	
12	LaFayette First Methodist Church	November 16, 2024	LaFayette	c. 1914	
13	Langdale Mill Village Historic District	July 22, 1991	Valley	1866	NRHP
14	Joe Louis Birthplace	August 6, 1993	LaFayette	1914	
15	Mitchell Springs United Methodist Church and School	March 18, 2021	Lanett	1916, 1947, 1963, 1974	
16	Mitchell-Wilkerson-Gaines House	January 10, 1983	LaFayette	c. 1845–1850	
17	Old Lanett High School	October 11, 1978	Lanett	c. 1923–1924	
18	Joe Rabbit House	July 6, 1976	LaFayette vicinity	c. 1829	
19	Rea-Schuessler-Fuller House	April 11, 1984	LaFayette	c. 1850–1855	
20	River View Mill Village Historic District	December 19, 1991	Valley	c. 1865–1980	NRHP
21	Sharpe Pioneer Homestead	February 27, 1978	LaFayette vicinity	c. 1870	
22	Shawmut Mill Village Historic District	December 19, 1991	Valley	c. 1907–1908	NRHP
23	Temple Beth-El (demolished)	March 3, 1976	Lanett	c. 1908	

== Cherokee County ==
	Site name	Date listed	City or Town	Built or Established	NRHP/NHL
1	Bradford-West House	October 17, 1980	Centre	c. 1863	
2	Cherokee County Courthouse	March 8, 2023	Centre	c. 1936	
3	Webb Chesnut House	September 26, 2003	Gaylesville	c. 1850	
4	Hatcher High School (JKF Community Center)	June 23, 2016	Centre	c. 1949	
5	Jordan's Old Place	May 9, 1978	Centre	c. 1880	
6	Jordan Big Store	August 10, 2017	Centre	c. 1921	
7	Major Chisholm Daniel House	August 5, 2010	Cedar Bluff	c. 1840	
8	Orville Estes Field	June 27, 2019	Centre	1942	
9	Parker House	September 3, 2020	Piedmont	1861; 1920s; 1950s	
10	Pleasant Gap County Store	April 11, 1984	Piedmont vicinity	c. 1896	
11	Pratt Park	January 14, 1980	Centre	c. 1905	
12	Rock Run Village	July 15, 1976	Piedmont vicinity	c. 1874	
13	Savage-Campbell House	May 19, 1981	Centre	c. 1908–1910	

== Chilton County ==
	Site name	Date listed	City or Town	Built or Established	NRHP/NHL
1	Chilton County Training School	September 27, 2007	Clanton vicinity	1951	
2	Confederate Memorial Cemetery	March 5, 1976	Mountain Creek	c. 1903–1933	
3	Higgins Industrial Addition	March 26, 2024	Clanton	c. 1904	
4	Hotel Wilson	May 22, 2008	Clanton	c. 1914	
5	Lay Dam	February 19, 1976	Clanton vicinity	c. 1910–1914	
6	Maplesville Depot	November 23, 1976	Maplesville	c. 1912	
7	Maplesville Methodist Episcopal Church	December 4, 1992	Maplesville	c. 1870–1890	
8	Maplesville Railroad Historic District	September 26, 2003	Maplesville	19th–20th century	
9	Matthews-Reynolds Home	December 29, 1975	Clanton	c. 1908–1909	
10	Mims Ferry	September 5, 1975	Coosa River	c. 1895, 1957	
11	Norman Smith Pottery	September 30, 1999	Lawley vicinity	1932	
12	Old Stage Coach Inn	August 13, 1987	Plantersville vicinity	c. 1835	
13	Thorsby Public School (Old Elementary School)	May 28, 2009	Thorsby	1925	
14	Tomlinson House	November 3, 1986	Jemison	c. 1893	

== Choctaw County ==
	Site name	Date listed	City or Town	Built or Established	NRHP/NHL
1	Allen Plantation	March 29, 2012	Lisman	c. 1897	
2	Bladon Springs Historic District	April 1, 1976	Bladon Springs	c. 1838–1910	
3	Choctaw County Courthouse	June 19, 1997	Butler	1906–1907	
4	Log Cabin School House	February 6, 1998	Toxey	c. 1850	
5	Old Naheola Bridge	16 2021	near Pennington	1934	
6	Pelham United Methodist Church	March 29, 2012	Edna	c. 1833; 1888	
7	Pushmataha Historic District	May 22, 2008	Pushmataha	c. 1850-1965	
8	Riderwood Union Church	June 21, 2012	Riderwood	c. 1925	
9	Zack Rogers House	March 30, 1989	Butler	c. 1880	
10	Silas Elementary School (Silas Municipal Complex)	June 30, 2013	Silas	c. 1936	

== See also ==
- Properties on the Alabama Register of Landmarks and Heritage by county (Clarke–Dallas)
- Properties on the Alabama Register of Landmarks and Heritage by county (DeKalb–Jackson)
- Properties on the Alabama Register of Landmarks and Heritage by county (Jefferson–Macon)
- Properties on the Alabama Register of Landmarks and Heritage by county (Madison–Perry)
- Properties on the Alabama Register of Landmarks and Heritage by county (Pickens–Winston)
