= Noble House =

Noble House may refer to:

- Noble house (term) or dynasty, a noble or aristocratic family of high social status or rank

== Arts, entertainment, and media ==
- Noble House (novel), a 1981 book by James Clavell
- Noble House (miniseries), a 1988 TV series based on the book
- Noble House Film & Television Inc., a film production company

== Places in the United States ==
- Noble House (Norfolk, Connecticut), NRHP-listed in Litchfield County
- Alexander Noble House, Fish Creek, Wisconsin, NRHP-listed in Door County
- Chapman-Noble House, Wichita, Kansas, NRHP-listed in Sedgwick County
- John Glover Noble House, New Milford, Connecticut, NRHP-listed in Litchfield County
- Jonathan Noble House, Columbus, Ohio, NRHP-listed in Columbus
- Kellum-Noble House, Houston, Texas, NRHP-listed in Harris County
- Lewis Noble House, Worthington, Ohio, NRHP-listed in Franklin County
- Noble Block, Augusta, Maine, NRHP-listed in Kennebec County
- Noble Cottage, Anniston, Alabama, listed on the National Register of Historic Places (NRHP) in Calhoun County
- Noble County Sheriff's House and Jail, Albion, Indiana, NRHP-listed
- Noble County Jail and Sheriff's Office, Caldwell, Ohio, NRHP-listed in Noble County
- Noble-Kendall House, Albia, Iowa, NRHP-listed in Monroe County
- Noble-McCaa-Butler House, Anniston, Alabama, NRHP-listed in Calhoun County
- Noble–Seymour–Crippen House, Chicago, Illinois, NRHP-listed
- The Island House, Elk Rapids, Michigan (sometimes referred to as the Edwin Noble House)

== See also ==
- List of noble houses
- Manor house
- Mansion
- Noble Hotel, an historic site in Watonga, Oklahoma
- Samuel Noble Monument, an historic site in Anniston, Alabama
