= The Donoho School =

Location
- 2501 Henry Road; Anniston, Alabama; USA; 33°39′12″N 85°47′25″W

Information
- Established: 1963
- President: David Noone
- Enrollment: 347 (2016)
- Mascot: Falcons
- Website: School website

The Donoho School is a private school in Anniston, Alabama, United States, that was honored by the Blue Ribbon Schools Program in 2005. The Donoho School serves students in grades PK through 12.

== History ==
The Anniston Academy was founded as a secondary institution in 1963 and renamed in 1976. The present Lower Division was founded as The Episcopal Day School in 1961 as an independent elementary school. Housed originally in the facilities of St. Michael and All Angels Episcopal Church (Anniston, Alabama), the school moved into Grace Episcopal Church in 1967.

In the early 1960s, local Anniston business leaders began to discuss creating a private school that could provide a classical education to the city's residents. Thomas S. Potts was appointed chairman of the school's board of governors. In 1963, he said that the school "will not be for the rich, but rather will contain a cross section of students."

Unlike other private schools in the South, the Anniston Academy was not founded as a "segregation academy" designed to attract white students whose families feared court-mandated integration. During the same month that the Anniston Academy opened its doors in 1963, many of its founders, including H. Miller Sproull, Charles Doster, and Lucian Lentz, fought alongside black community leaders to desegregate Anniston's public library, staring down opposition from the Ku Klux Klan. In 1970, headmaster Allan Strand attributed some of the school's growth to white parents fleeing racially integrated public schools, but said the school never considered itself "as a school set up just to avoid integration."

In 1976, the school's officials reiterated that the school did not "exist to promote segregation and that it does not open its doors to students seeking to flee desegregation," and instead had enrolled several black students. That year, the name was changed to The Donoho School in recognition of Mrs. Harriet Wallis Donoho, a founder and benefactor of the school. In 1983, then-headmaster Tom Potts said the name change was also motivated by a desire to distance the school from similarly named, all-white segregation academies that had opened in other Alabama cities In 1981, then-principal George Gorey, Jr. said that integration had affected the school's enrollment "less than almost anywhere else" because the school "isn't your typical Southern school" and was not a segregation academy. Instead, Gorey said the school sought to enroll more black students.

In the summer of 1976, The Episcopal Day School merged with The Donoho School and became the Lower Division. In 1980 the Lower and Middle Divisions moved into a new facility constructed on the Donoho campus and The Donoho Upper School divided to become a Middle Division, containing grades seven and eight, and an Upper Division for grades nine through twelve.

In 1989, the Middle Division moved into a new facility constructed adjacent to the Upper Division. This expansion allowed the school to offer two sections per grade in kindergarten through grade twelve. Further additions in the early childhood department have brought the school to its current status of two sections in pre-kindergarten through grade twelve.

== Facilities ==
The Donoho School 75-acre (30 ha) campus is located in the foothills of the southern Appalachian Mountains. Anniston, Alabama is accessible with two exits on Interstate Route 20 approximately 100 miles (160 km) from Atlanta, Georgia, to the east, and 60 miles (97 km) from Birmingham, Alabama, to the west.
