= Ten Oaks =

Historic house in Alabama, United States

- U.S. National Register of Historic Places
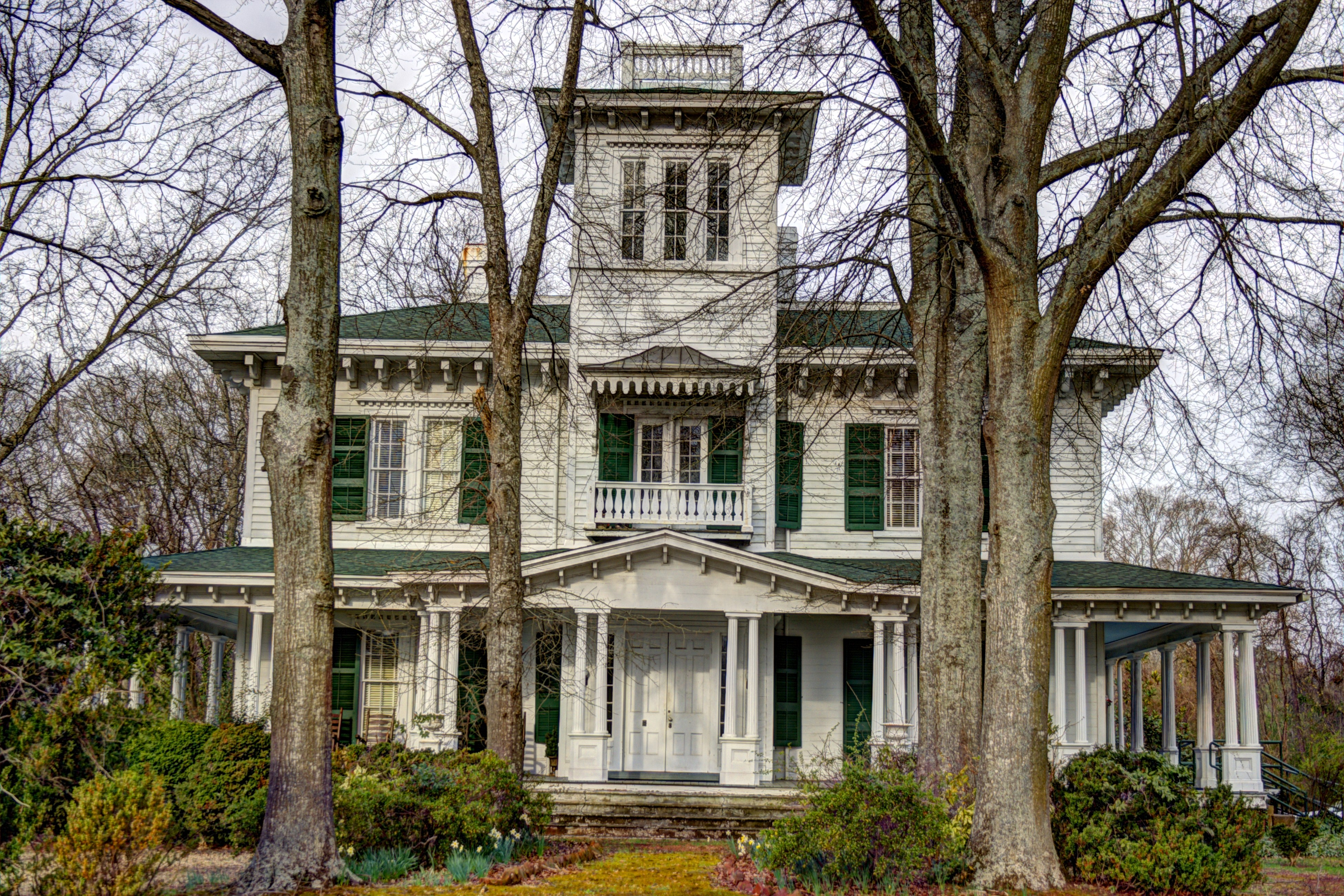
- Ten Oaks in 2014

- Location within Alabama Location within the United States
- Location: 805 Pelham Road South, Jacksonville, Alabama
- Coordinates: 33°48′32″N 85°45′44″W
- Area: 4.9 acres (2.0 ha)
- Built: 1856
- Architectural style: Italianate
- NRHP reference No.: 01001298
- Added to NRHP: November 29, 2001

Ten Oaks, also known as the Peyton Rowan House, is a historic mansion in Jacksonville, Alabama, U.S..

== History ==
The house was built in 1856 for James Madison Crook. It was designed in the Italianate architectural style. In October 1864, in the midst of the American Civil War, Confederate general P. G. T. Beauregard visited the house. A historical marker about the visit was added outside the house in 1970.

In 1865, the house was purchased by Major Peyton Rowan, who lived there with his wife, the former Miss Forney, and their four children, John Forney, Sallie Lorene, Mary Emma and George Hoke. Rowan was a merchant and Mason; the family lived in the house until 1906. It was later inherited by their granddaughter Anne and her husband, T. Weller Smith.

The house has been listed on the National Register of Historic Places since November 29, 2001.
