= Bank of Anniston =

- U.S. National Register of Historic Places
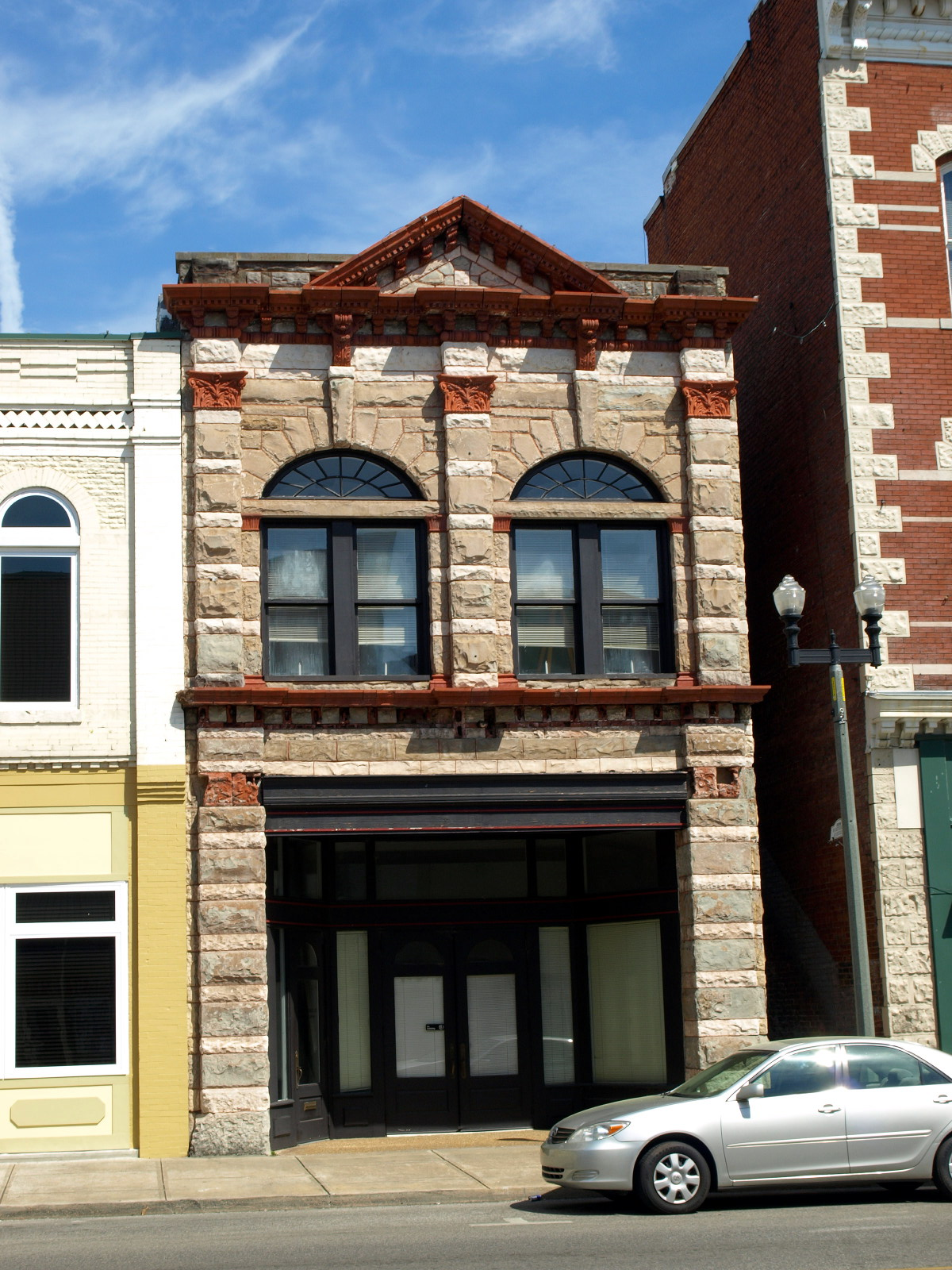

- Location within Alabama
- Location: 1005 Noble St., Anniston, Alabama
- Coordinates: 33°39′25″N 85°49′46″W
- Area: less than one acre
- Built: 1888
- Architectural style: Classical Revival
- MPS: Anniston MRA
- NRHP reference No.: 85002865
- Added to NRHP: October 3, 1985

The Bank of Anniston was a bank in Anniston, Alabama, United States, that failed in 1898. Its headquarters building, at 1005 Noble St. in Anniston, was built in 1888 and was listed on the National Register of Historic Places in 1985.

It was deemed "significant as a notable example, in Anniston, of a small Victorian neoclassical commercial building particularly distinguished by the use of stone ornamentation." It is one of few historic commercial buildings on Noble Street which survived "moderization" of the downtown area in the 1940s and later.

It was home of "Couch's Jewelers" in 1984.

== See also ==
- Caldwell Building, adjacent, also NRHP-listed
