= Sardis Baptist Church (Union Springs, Alabama) =

Historic church

- U.S. National Register of Historic Places
- Alabama Register of Landmarks and Heritage
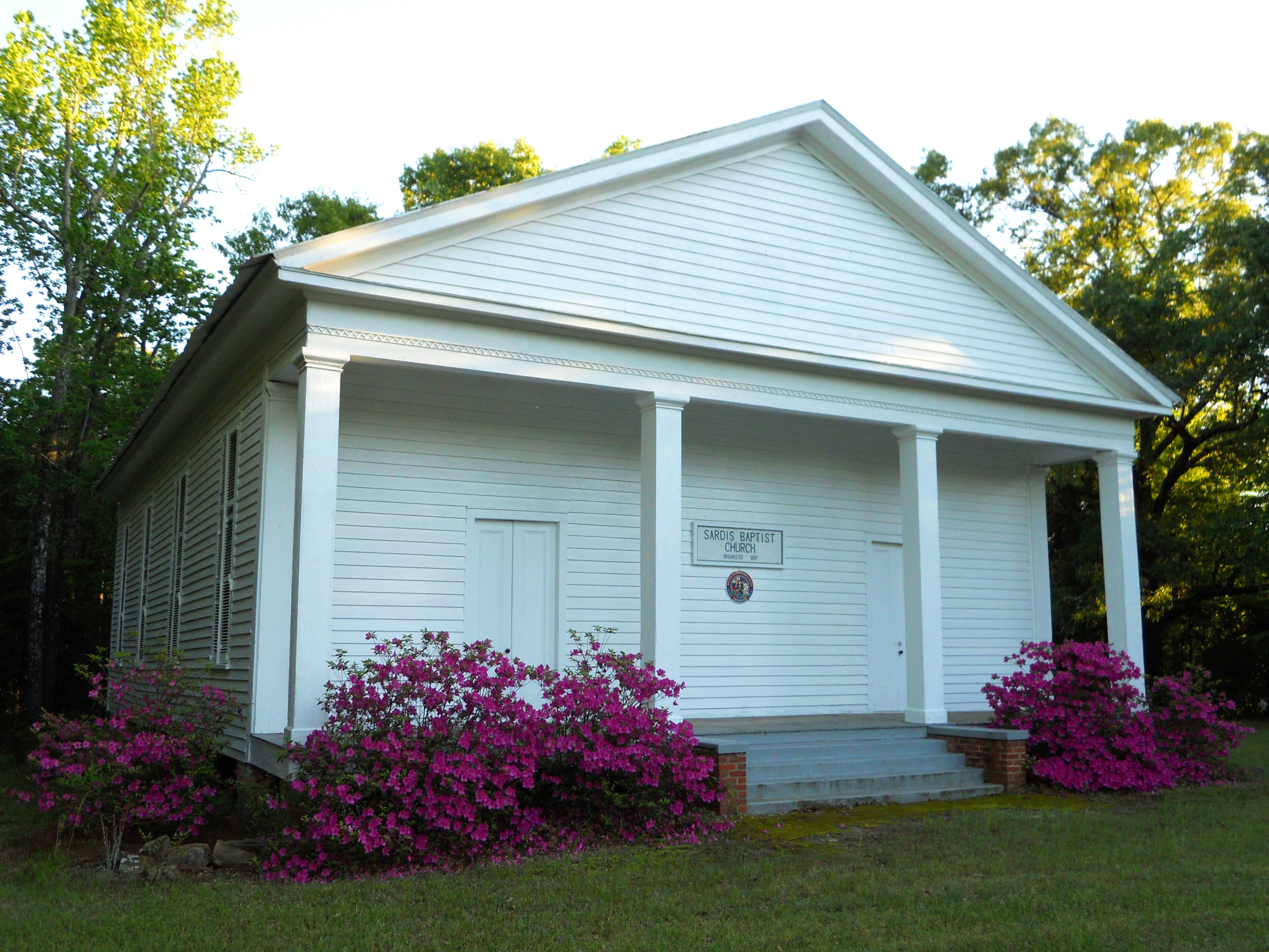
- Sardis Baptist Church in 2011

- Location within Alabama Location within the United States
- Nearest city: Union Springs, Alabama
- Coordinates: 32°5′18″N 85°45′44″W
- Area: 6 acres (2.4 ha)
- Built: 1850
- Architectural style: Greek Revival
- NRHP reference No.: 01001299

Significant dates
- Added to NRHP: November 29, 2001
- Designated ARLH: December 19, 1991

Sardis Baptist Church is a historic church near Union Springs, Alabama, United States.

Settlers from the Edgefield District, South Carolina, organized the Sardis Baptist Church on June 10, 1837. The first building, a log cabin, was constructed in 1841 after John M. Dozier and his wife, Amy Youngblood Dozier, deeded four and one-half acres to the church for a building and cemetery. The present building, constructed in 1850, is an exceptionally fine example of rural antebellum church architecture of Greek Revival style.

Relatively unaltered since construction, its four columns support a full entablature and low-pitched roof. Each of the two primary entrances have double-paneled doors trimmed with unadorned molding, and each side of the building has four tall, shuttered, 18-light windows.

The church ultimately became inactive in the 1950s. The building was renovated and repaired in 1940-41 and then again in 1992–93.

In the cemetery, the oldest tombstone bears the name of Moses E. Martin, died May 18, 1848. Part of the cemetery near the church served the African-American community during the early years. As the need arose for more space, William Andrew Martin and his wife, Nancy Strom Martin, who had bought the adjoining land from the Doziers in 1860, allowed the church to extend the cemetery southward onto their property.

Sardis School, a community school, was located on the church property across the highway from the church on the corner of Highway 223 and County Road 22. Newspaper articles indicate the school was operating in 1861 and 1870. The old Sardis School building was subsequently moved east on County Road 22 where it became, as it remains today, the living room of the Livingston Paulk home.

In 1867, the Buena Vista Masonic Lodge No. 169 was located just north of the church property.

The church was added to the Alabama Register of Landmarks and Heritage on December 19, 1991, and the National Register of Historic Places on November 29, 2001.

== See also ==
- National Register of Historic Places listings in Alabama
- Historical Marker Database
