= Dr. J.C. Francis Office =

- Dr. J. C. Francis Office
- U.S. National Register of Historic Places
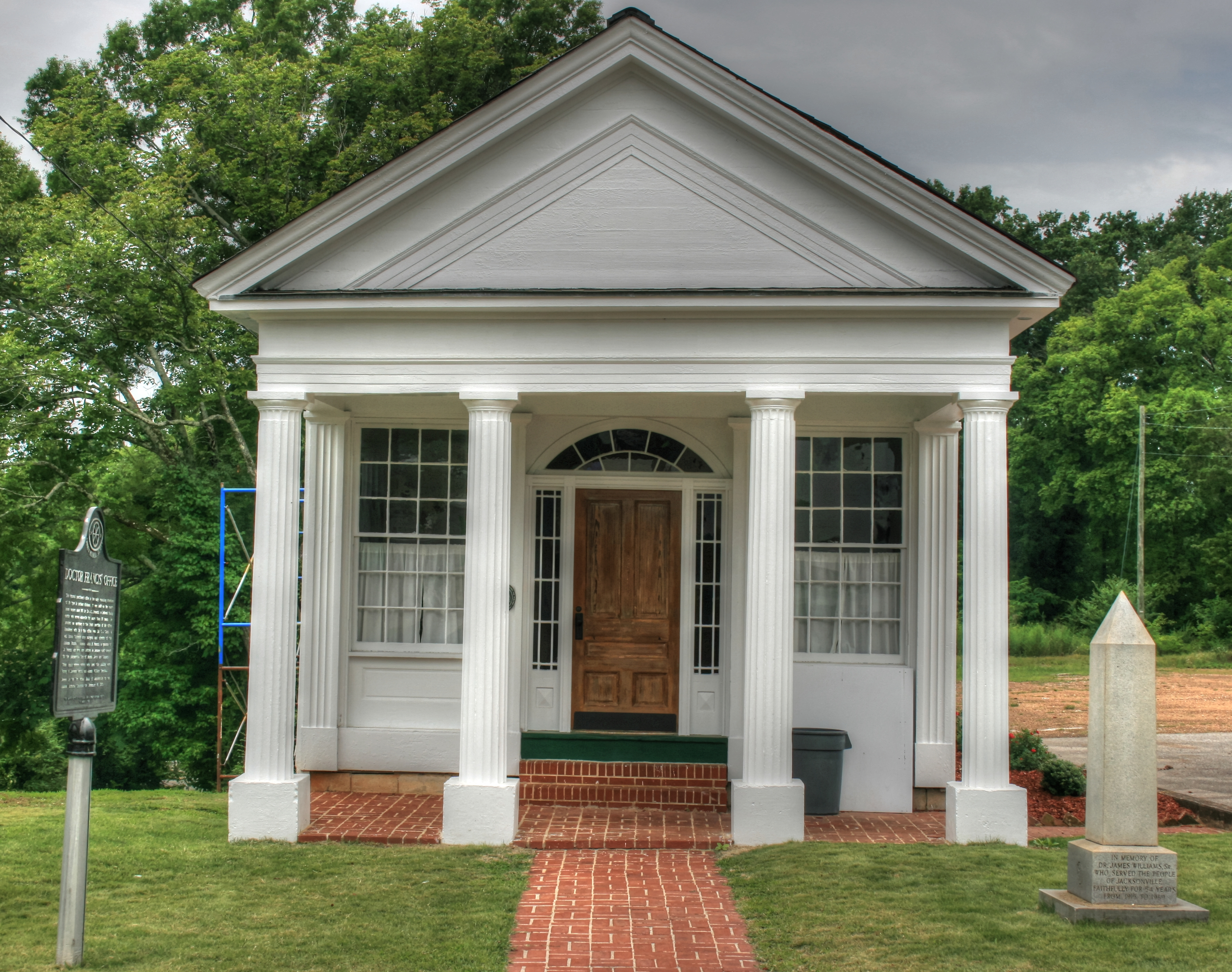
- The building in 2014

- Location within Alabama
- Location: 100 Gayle Street, Jacksonville, Alabama
- Coordinates: 33°48′51″N 85°45′43″W
- Area: 0.1 acres (0.040 ha)
- Built: 1852
- Architectural style: American National
- NRHP reference No.: 70000100
- Added to NRHP: November 20, 1970

The Dr. J.C. Francis Office is a historic building in Jacksonville, Alabama, United States. It was built in 1852 as a medical practice for Dr. J.C. Francis, and designed in the American National style. Francis was born in Ray County, Tennessee and trained in Lexington, Kentucky before moving to Alabama. The building has been listed on the National Register of Historic Places since November 20, 1970.
