= Anniston Union Depot =

- Union Depot and Freight House
- U.S. National Register of Historic Places
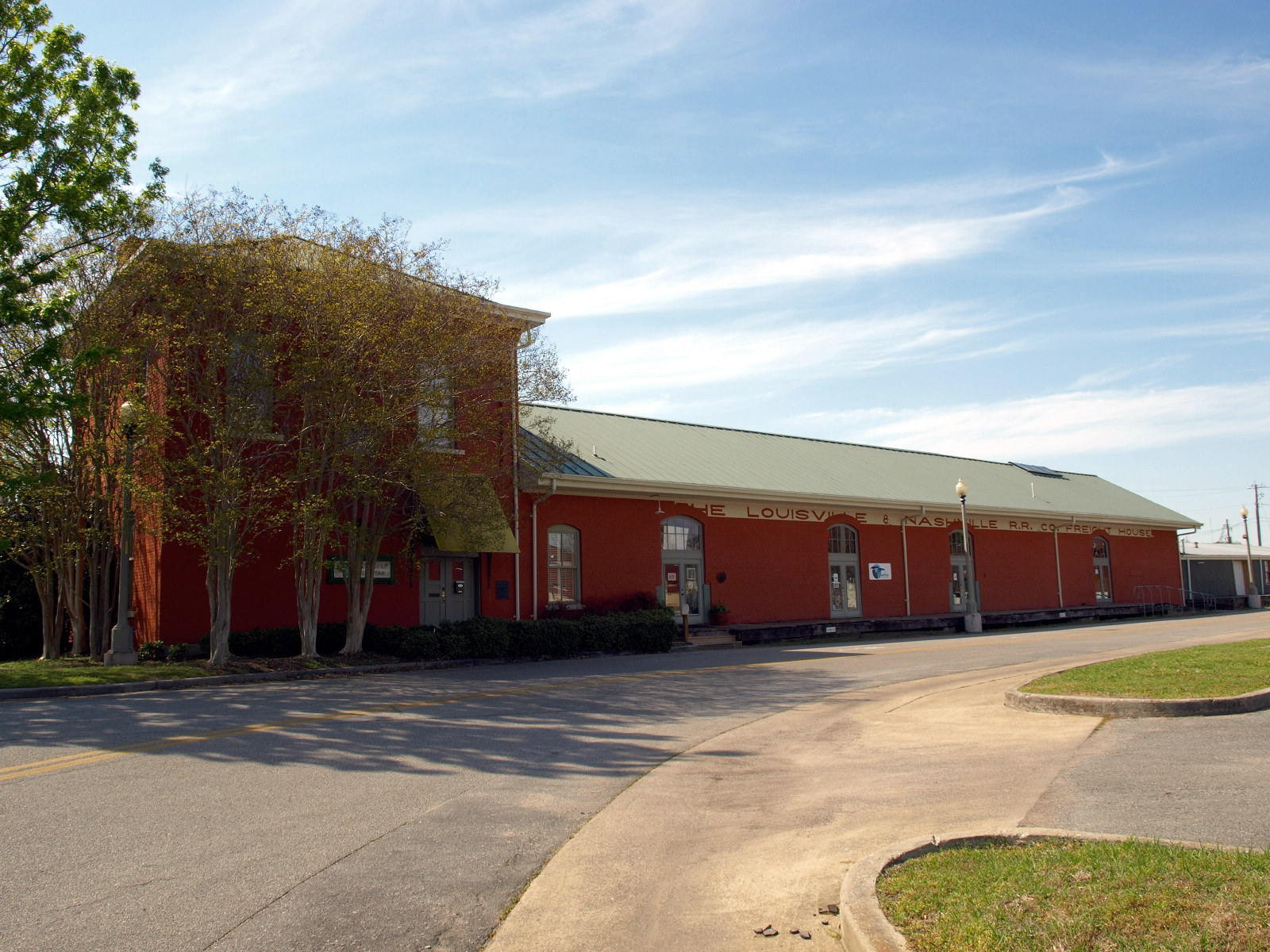
- The Union Depot and Freight House building in April 2014
- Location: 1300 Walnut Ave., Anniston, Alabama
- Coordinates: 33°39′39″N 85°50′1″W
- Area: approximately one acre
- Built: 1885
- NRHP reference No.: 85002889
- Added to NRHP: October 3, 1985

The Union Depot and Freight House in Anniston, Alabama, United States, is a building listed on the National Register of Historic Places.
