= Richard P. Huger House =

- U.S. National Register of Historic Places
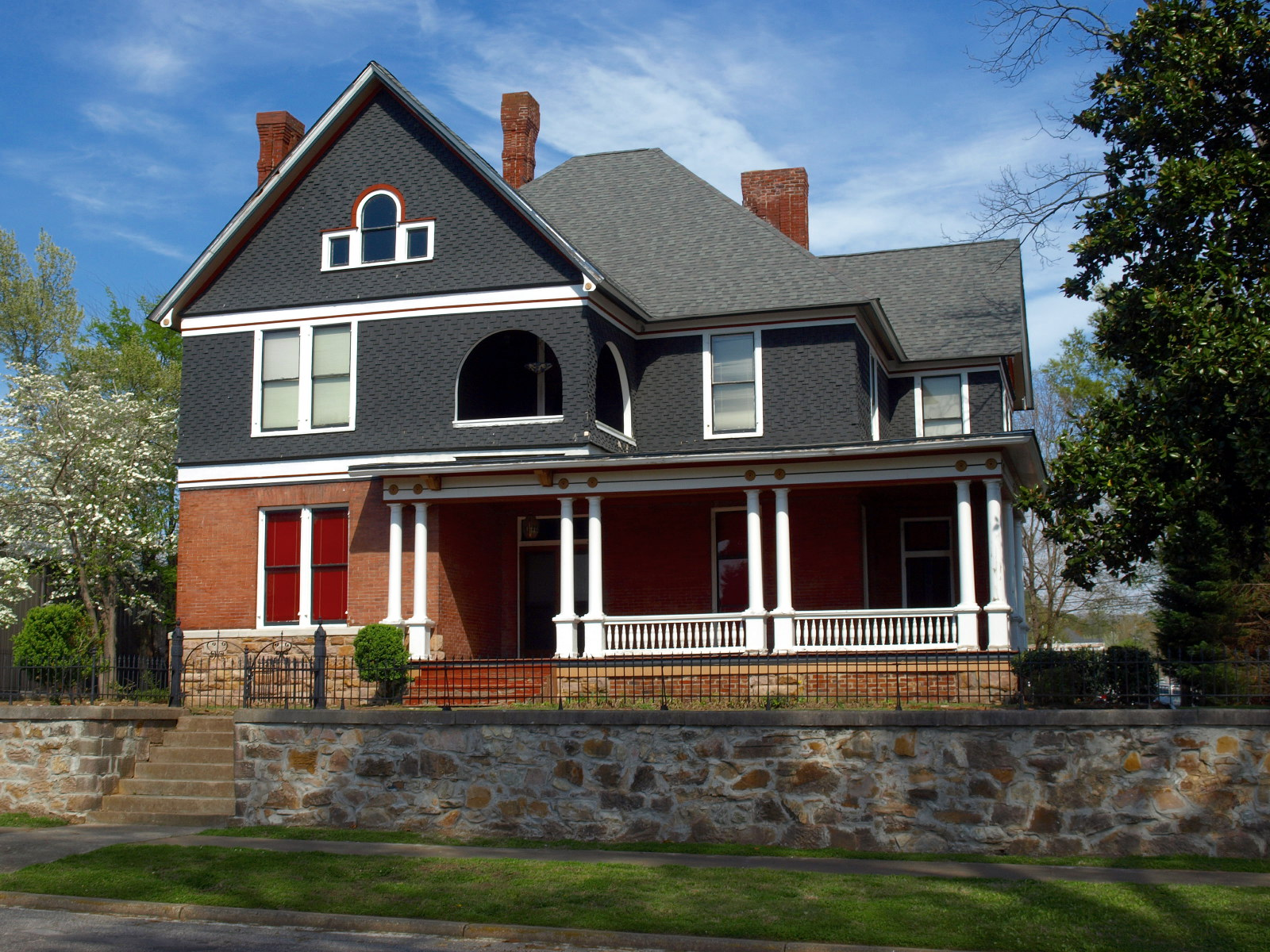

- Location within Alabama
- Location: 1901 Wilmer Ave., Anniston, Alabama
- Coordinates: 33°40′08″N 85°49′41″W
- Area: less than one acre
- Built: 1888
- Architect: William H. Wood
- Architectural style: Classical Revival, Shingle Style
- MPS: Anniston MRA
- NRHP reference No.: 85002871
- Added to NRHP: October 3, 1985

The Richard P. Huger House, at 1901 Wilmer Ave. in Anniston, Alabama, United States, was built in 1888. It was listed on the National Register of Historic Places in 1985.

It has also been known as the Brazelton House or the Huger-Brazelton House. It was deemed "significant for its association with Dr. Richard P. Huger who was the first physician to practice in Anniston and who served two terms as mayor of the city from 1887-1891."

It is one of few surviving houses "of quality" from Anniston's construction boom of the 1880s. It is basically Classical Revival in style, but with Shingle Style influence.

It is locally attributed to architect William H. Wood.
