= Alexander Woods House =

Historic house in Alabama, United States

- Woods-Crook-Tredaway House
- U.S. National Register of Historic Places
- Alabama Register of Landmarks and Heritage
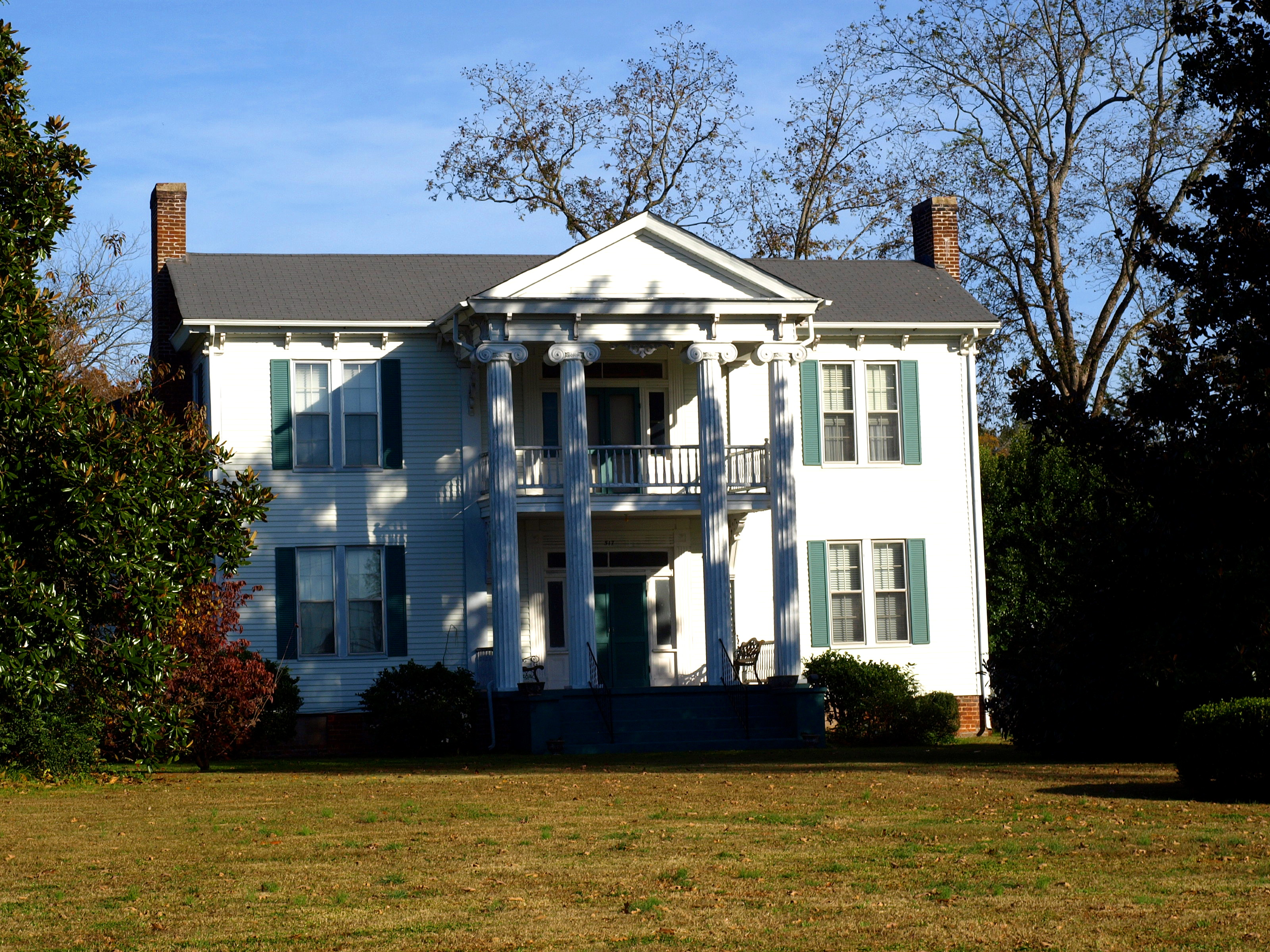
- The Alexander Woods House in 2017

- Location within Alabama Location within the United States
- Location: 517 N. Pelham Road, Jacksonville, Alabama
- Coordinates: 33°49′13″N 85°45′40″W
- Area: 1.8 acres (0.73 ha)
- Built: 1853
- Architectural style: Greek Revival, Italianate
- NRHP reference No.: 87001651

Significant dates
- Added to NRHP: March 15, 1988
- Designated ARLH: January 14, 1982

The Alexander Woods-Crook-Tredaway House is a historic mansion in Jacksonville, Alabama, United States. It was built circa 1853 for Alexander Woods, who served as the probate judge of Calhoun County from 1844 to 1880. It was purchased by Samuel W. Crook in 1866, and by Louise Tredaway in 1919. Louise Tredaway left the home to her only son, Floyd "Buddy" Tredaway. It is currently owned by his youngest daughter, Joyce Allison Tredaway. It was designed in the Greek Revival architectural style. It has been listed on the National Register of Historic Places since March 15, 1978.
