= Lyric Theatre (Anniston, Alabama) =

Historic theatre building in Alabama, US

- U.S. National Register of Historic Places
- Alabama Register of Landmarks and Heritage
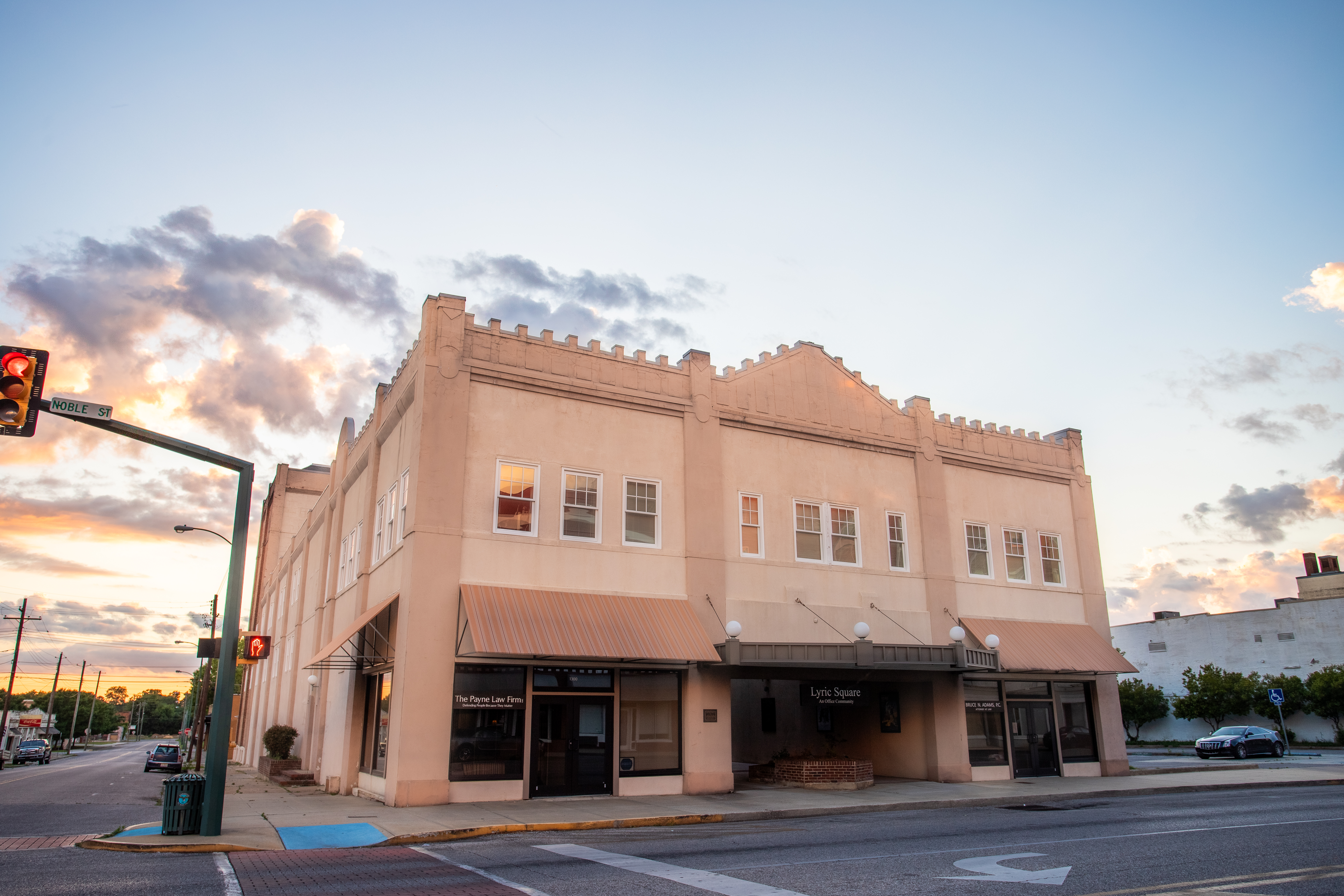
- Lyric Theatre in 2024
- Location: 1302 Noble Street, Anniston, Alabama, U.S.
- Coordinates: 33.661111°N 85.830278°W
- Built: 1918
- NRHP reference No.: 80000681

Significant dates
- Added to NRHP: May 22, 1980
- Designated ARLH: August 6, 1976

Lyric Theatre, formerly the Ritz Theatre, is a historic theatre building built in 1918 in Anniston, Alabama, U.S. It is an example of early-20th century entertainment facilities in smaller Alabama cities. It is no longer in operations as a theatre.

It is listed on the National Register of Historic Places since May 22, 1980; and is listed on the Alabama Register of Landmarks and Heritage since August 6, 1976.

== History ==
The building was constructed for the Anniston Theatre Company in 1918 and sold to the Anniston Amusement Company the following year. From its opening until 1928, the building hosted the Keith Vaudeville circuit of New York and a summer Chautauqua circuit. It was the main source of entertainment for the men at Camp McClellan, who were training there for World War I. In 1924, the building was purchased by F. T. and E. D. Banks, but due to financial difficulties, the F. T. Banks Realty Company, Inc. was formed two years later and shares were sold.

In either 1927 or 1928, the building was leased by Publix Theaters, a major theater chain and adapted for motion pictures. At this time a minor remodeling took place, and the name was changed to the Ritz. The first picture film, Al Jolson's "The Jazz Singer", was shown in October 1928. In the early 1930's the building was leased by Wilby and Kincey, a local subsidiary of Paramount Pictures. In 1975, the Anniston Little Theatre purchased the building, with the goal of restoring the building for local productions.

The rear of the building still hosts a ghost sign for the Ritz Theatre and Keith Vaudeville.

== Gallery ==
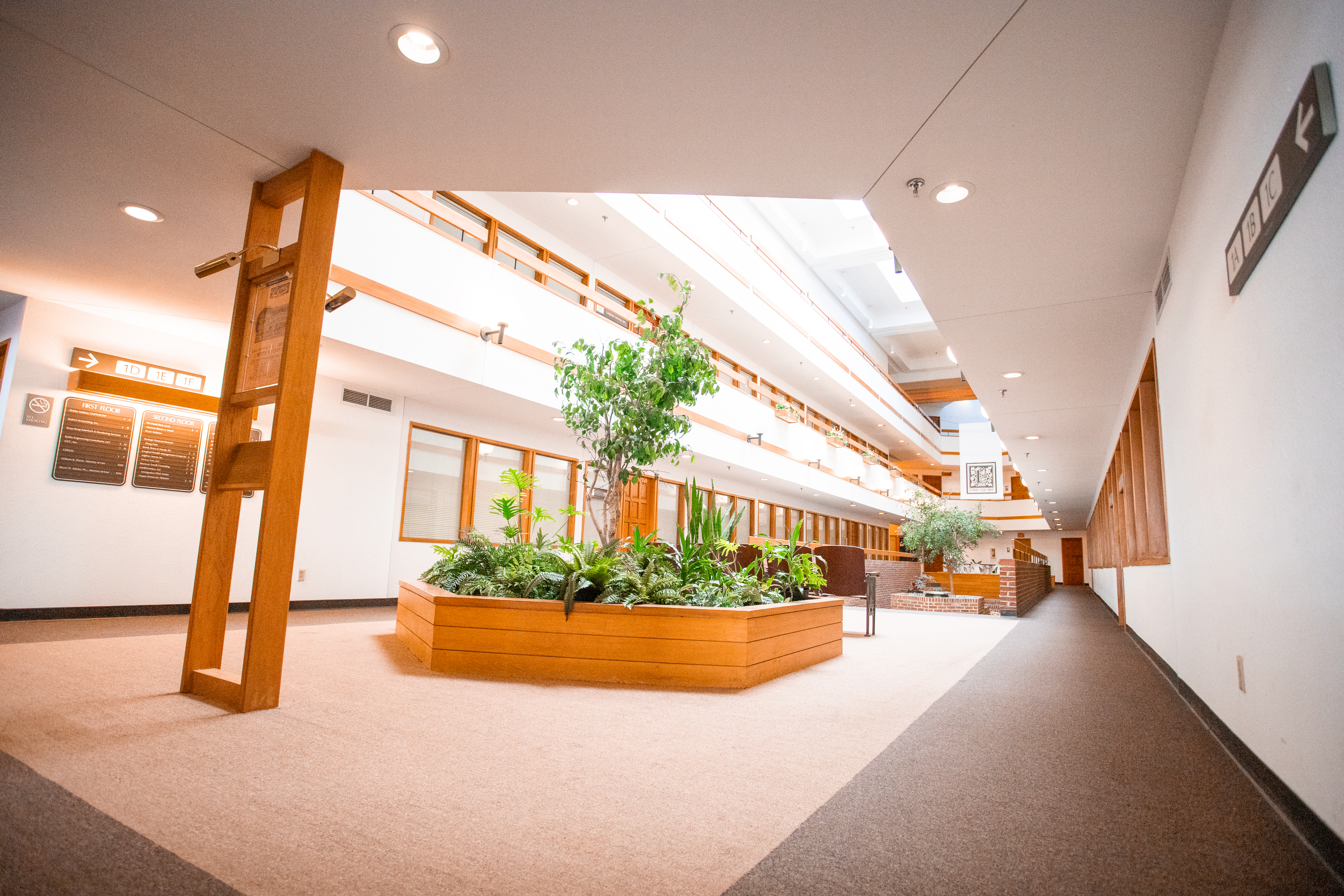
The atrium now functions as common space for the offices using the building.

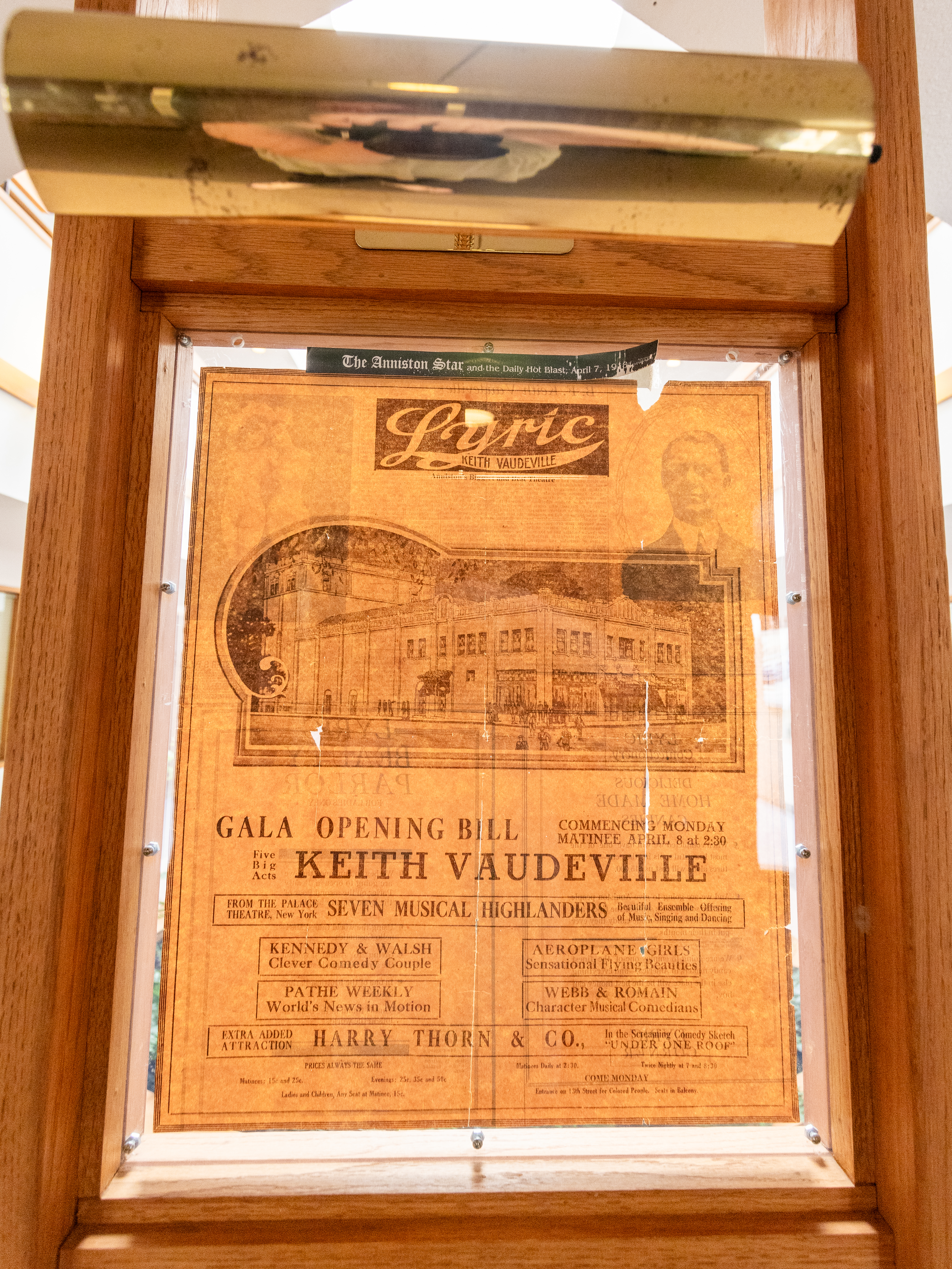
An original copy of The Anniston Star and the Daily Hot Blast from April 7, 1918, announcing the grand opening of the Lyric Theatre. On display in the atrium of the Lyric Square building.

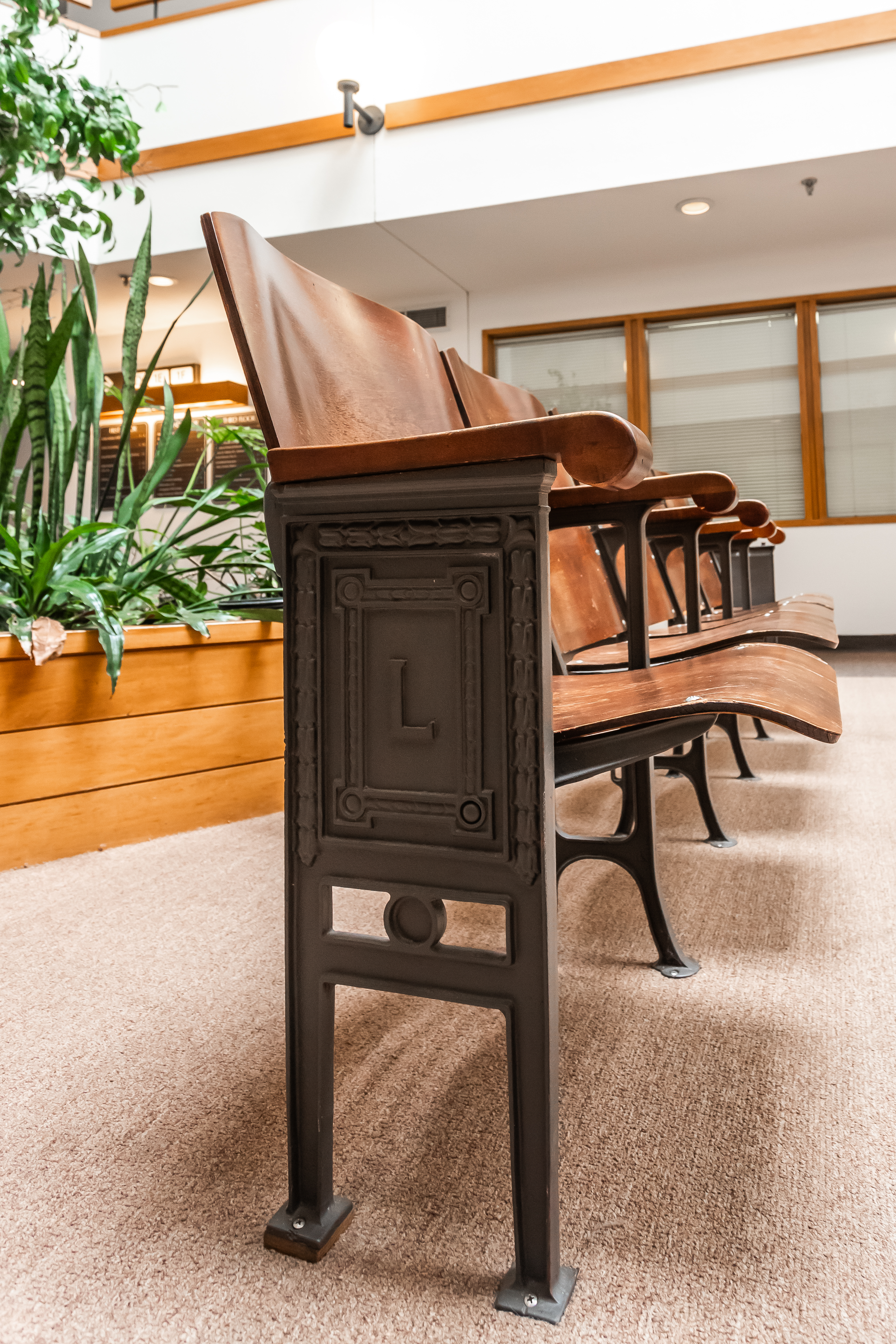
Original seats from the Lyric Theatre were preserved and are visible in the building's atrium.

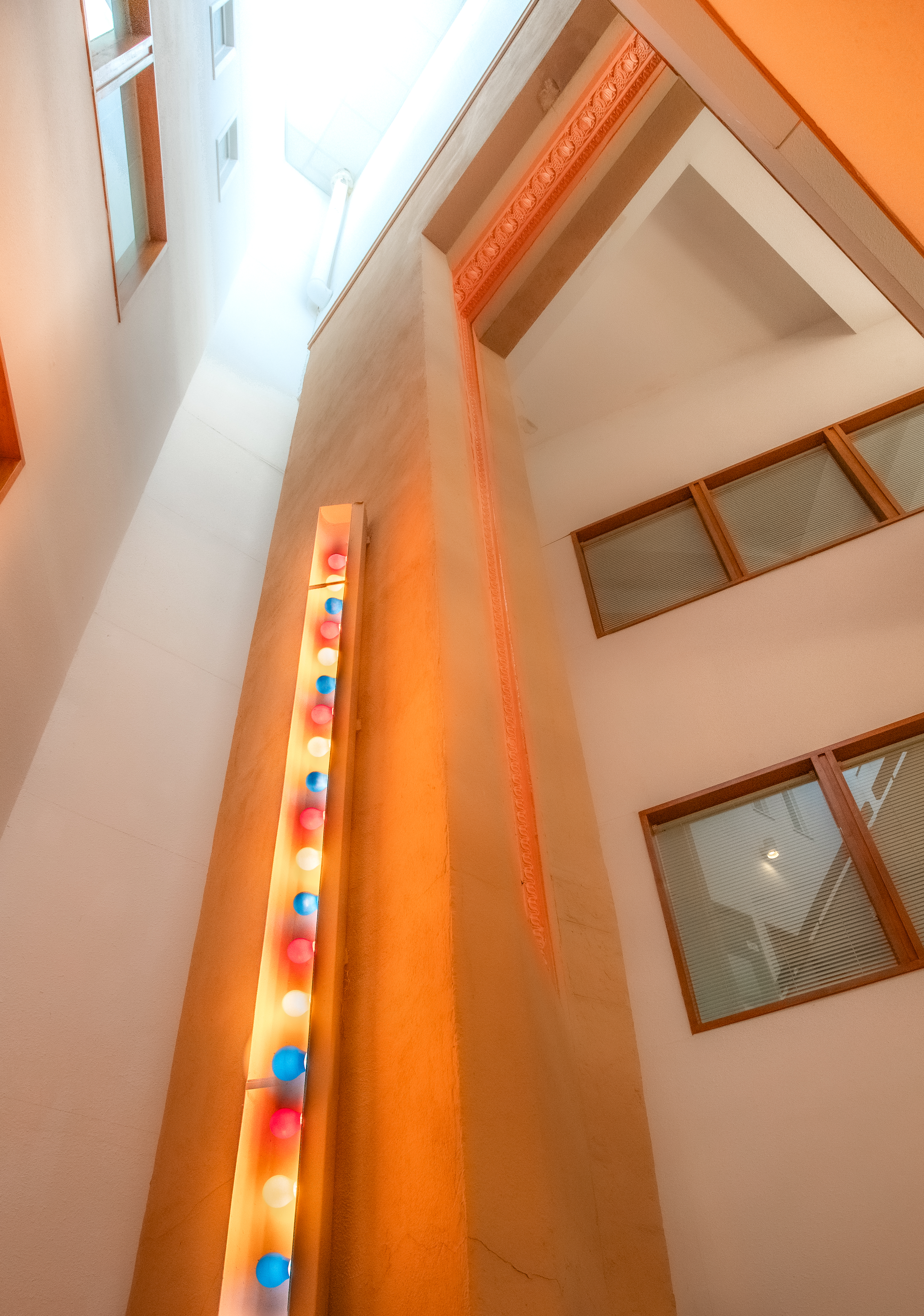
The Lyric Square building preserved the original proscenium arch and colored lights from its original use as a theatre.

== See also ==
- National Register of Historic Places listings in Calhoun County, Alabama
