= Glen Addie Volunteer Hose Company Fire Hall =

- U.S. National Register of Historic Places
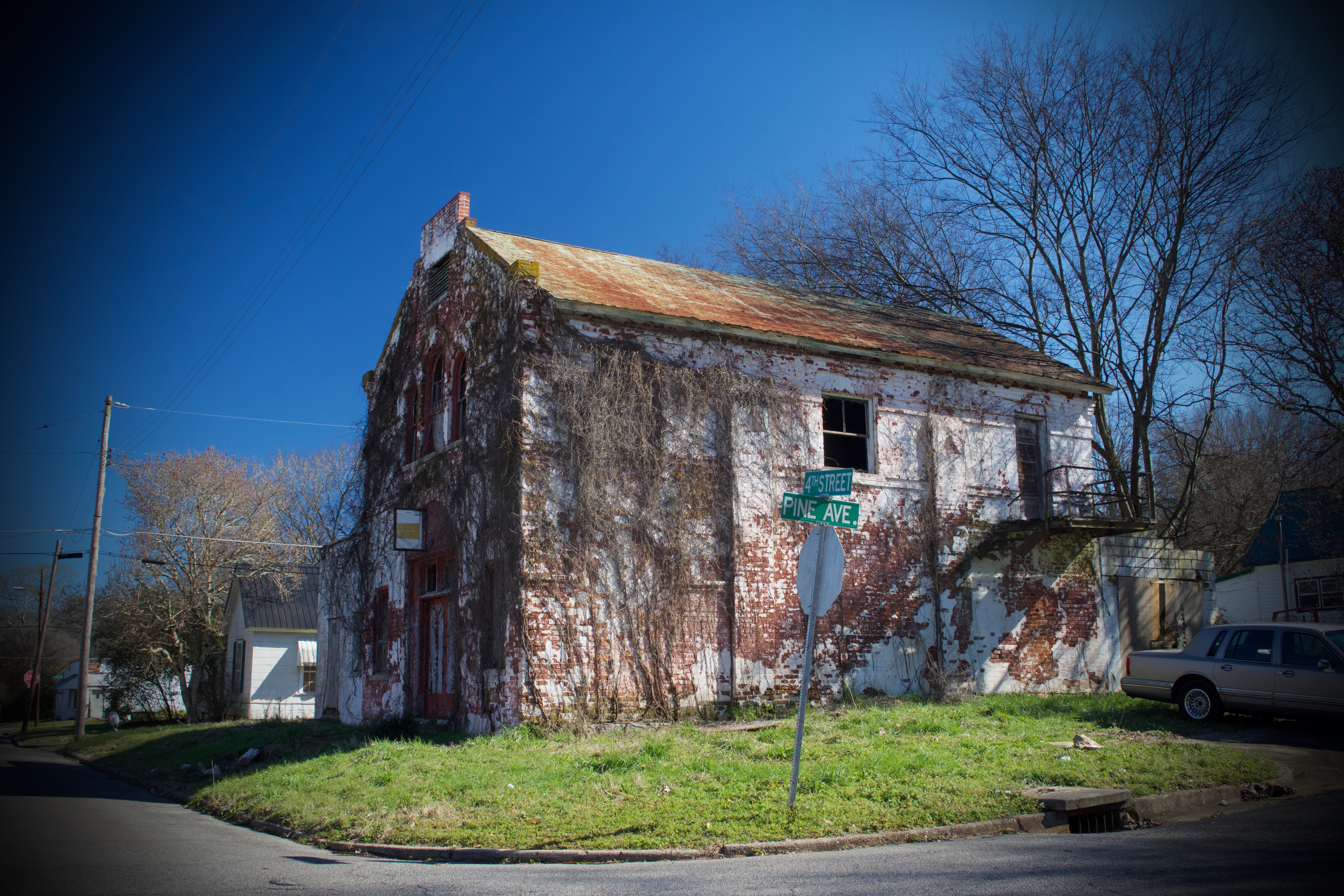

- Location within Alabama
- Location: Fourth St. and Pine Ave., Anniston, Alabama
- Coordinates: 33°38′55″N 85°50′12″W
- Area: less than one acre
- Built: 1885
- Architectural style: Romanesque, Early Richarsonian
- MPS: Anniston MRA
- NRHP reference No.: 85002738
- Added to NRHP: October 3, 1985

The Glen Addie Volunteer Hose Company Fire Hall, at Fourth St. and Pine Ave. in Anniston, Alabama, United States, was built in 1885. It was listed on the National Register of Historic Places in 1985.

It is an early Richardsonian Romanesque-style two-story brick building.
