= Glenwood Terrace Residential Historic District =

- U.S. National Register of Historic Places
- U.S. Historic district
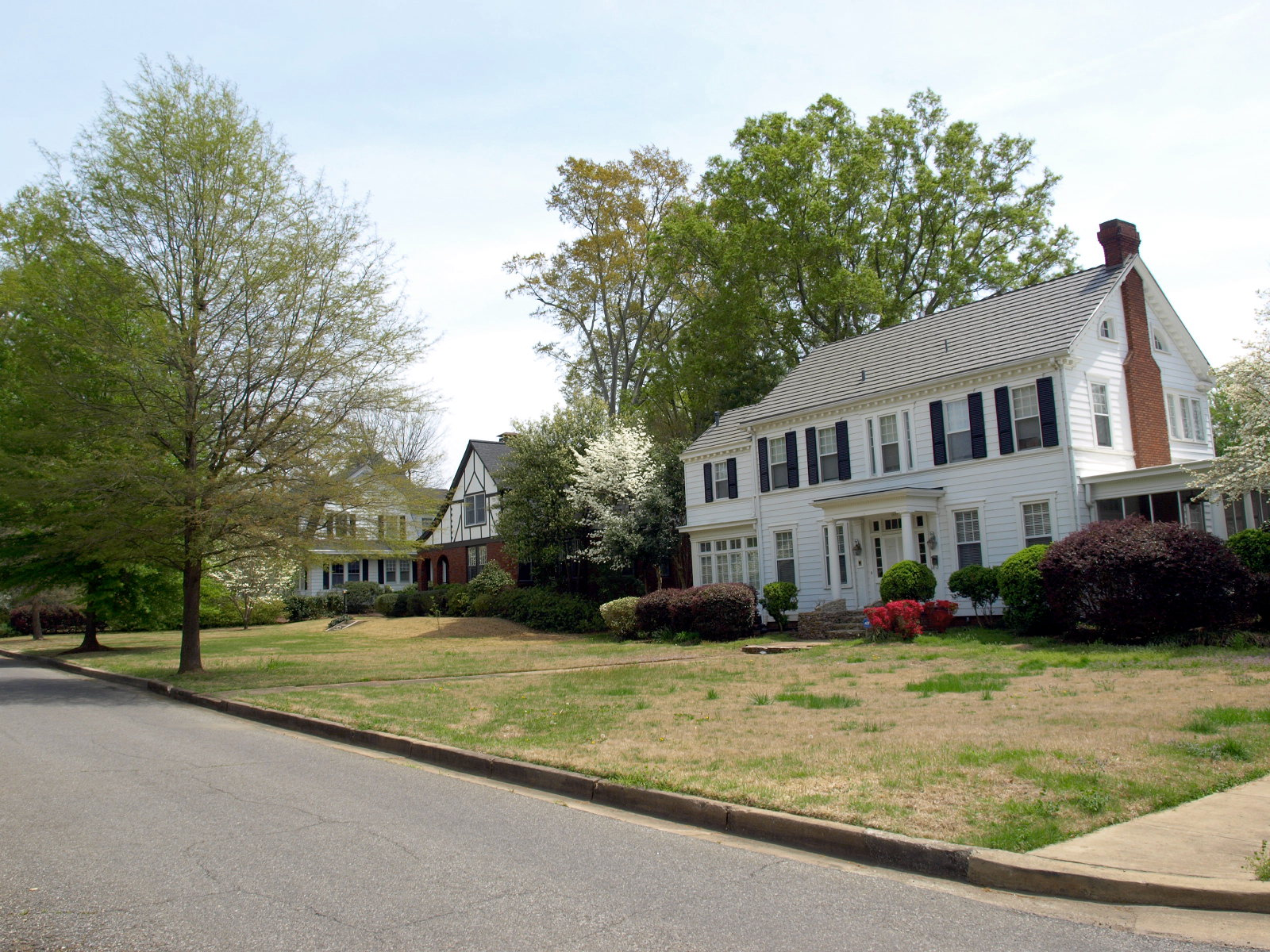
- Houses on Glenwood Terrace in April 2014
- Interactive map of Glenwood Terrace Residential Historic District
- Location: Roughly bounded by Oak St., Jefferson Ave., lots on the southern side of Glenwood Terrace, the northern side of Orchard St., and Highland Ave., Anniston, Alabama
- Coordinates: 33.65462°N 85.81702°W
- Built: 1916–1936
- MPS: Anniston MRA
- NRHP reference No.: 85002867
- Added to NRHP: October 3, 1985

The Glenwood Terrace Residential Historic District is a historic district in Anniston, Alabama. The district consists of fifteen houses along a 2-block portion of divided boulevard in the east side of the city. The street was laid out in 1915 by developers W. H. Orrison, W. G. Johnston, L. C. Watson, and Walker Reynolds, and includes large lots and cast iron street lamps identical to those downtown. The street attracted upper-class families, who built 2- and 2-and-a-half-story houses in styles popular in the interwar period, such as Colonial Revival, Neoclassical, and Tudor Revival.

The district was listed on the National Register of Historic Places in 1985.
