= Samuel Noble Monument =

- U.S. National Register of Historic Places
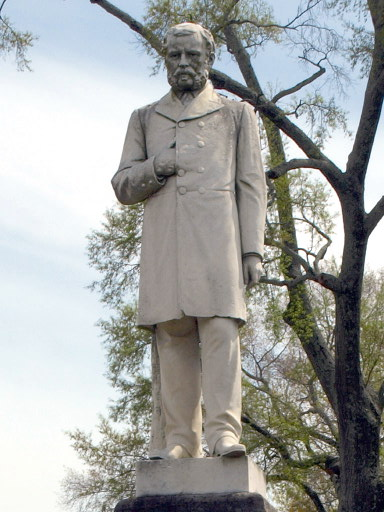
- Samuel Noble Monument

- Location within Alabama Location within the United States
- Nearest city: Anniston, Alabama
- Coordinates: 33.658056°N 85.826667°W
- Built: 1895
- NRHP reference No.: 85002876
- Added to NRHP: October 3, 1985

The Samuel Noble Monument is a commemorative sculpture located at the parkway median of Quintard Avenue and 11th Street in the city of Anniston, Alabama, United States, and was erected in 1895 to honor the town's founder, Samuel Noble.

Noble immigrated with his family to the United States from England. The family owned a weaponry foundry in Georgia during the American Civil War, supplying armaments to the Confederate States Army. Their foundry was subsequently destroyed by the U.S. Army in 1864. At the war's end, they began rebuilding their business in Georgia, and purchased land in Calhoun County, Alabama, as an expansion. They went into partnership with former Union general Daniel Tyler and formed the Woodstock Iron Company in 1872, with the budding community being referred to by the same name as the company. The small town was renamed Anniston, after Tyler's daughter-in-law, to avoid confusion over another Woodstock located between Bibb and Tuscaloosa counties. Noble and Tyler personally designed the layout of their town that housed only company employees. The Woodstock Company constructed the buildings and installed the infrastructure.

Several years after Noble's 1888 death, $5,400 was raised for a memorial, and Anniston accepted a design of a granite and white marble statue from Durham and Company in Charlotte, North Carolina. The actual sculpting was done by unknown persons in Italy under contract to Morris Brothers in Memphis, Tennessee. The public unveiling of the statue by Noble's granddaughter Elizabeth Roberts, was preceded by a parade through Anniston.

It was added to the National Register of Historic Places in 1985 as an example of sculpture used to commemorate historical events or persons. Although the Encyclopedia of Alabama credits all concerned in the establishment and development of Anniston, the townspeople who commissioned the statue and the National Park Service give recognition only to Noble as the actual founder.
