= Aderholdt's Mill =

Historic mill in Alabama, US

- U.S. National Register of Historic Places
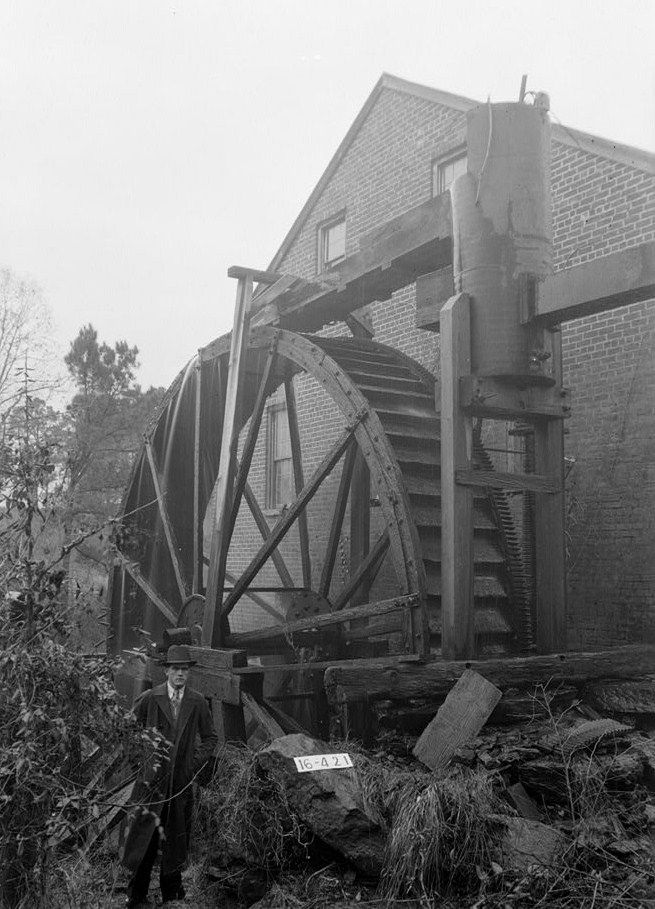
- The mill with the original water wheel as photographed by the Historic American Buildings Survey in 1935

- Location within Alabama Location within the United States
- Nearest city: Jacksonville, Alabama
- Coordinates: 33.780°N 85.766°W
- Area: 15.2 acres (6.2 ha)
- Built: 1836
- Architects: Crutchfield, Thomas
- NRHP reference No.: 88003077
- Added to NRHP: December 29, 1988

Aderholdt's Mill was built about 1839 near Jacksonville, Alabama, United States. The 2 1/2-story brick mill is built in a hillside, originally with an overshot millwheel, replaced by an undershot turbine about 1936. It was built by Thomas Crutchfield for Thomas Riley Williams on an offshoot of Little Tallasseehatchie Creek for $2000, replacing a mill that had burned. It was sold in 1853 to James A. Stevenson. After a series of transactions the mill was purchased by James E. Aderholdt, who operated it with the new turbine until 1976. The mill and its machinery remain intact.

Aderholdt's Mill was placed on the National Register of Historic Places on December 29, 1988.
