= Anniston Manufacturing Company =

- Anniston Cotton Manufacturing Company
- U.S. National Register of Historic Places
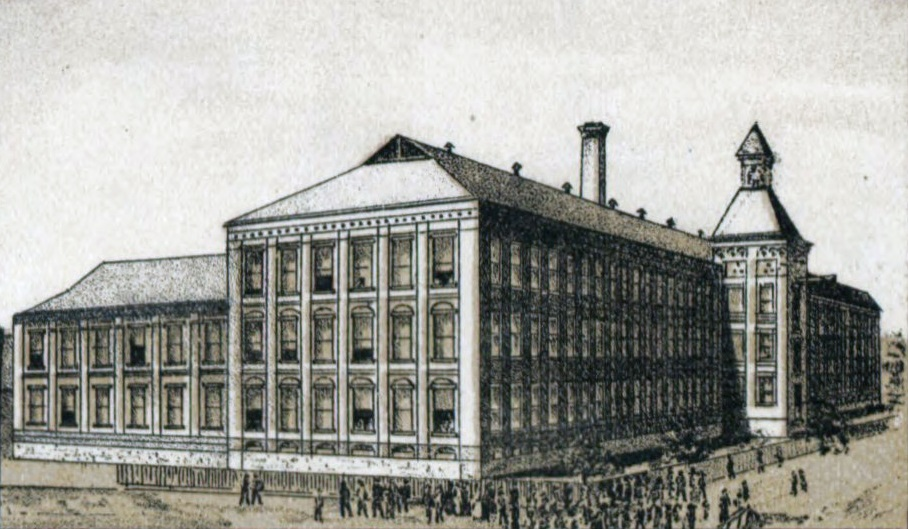

- Location within Alabama Location within the United States
- Location: 215 W. Eleventh St., Anniston, Alabama
- Coordinates: 33°39′34″N 85°50′06″W
- Area: 14 acres (5.7 ha)
- Built: 1880
- Architectural style: Late 19th and 20th Century Revivals, Italian Renaissance Revival
- MPS: Anniston MRA
- NRHP reference No.: 85002739
- Added to NRHP: October 3, 1985

The Anniston Cotton Manufacturing Company was a cotton mill which operated from 1880 to 1977.

Its three-building complex at 215 W. Eleventh St. in Anniston, Alabama, United States, built in 1880, was listed on the National Register of Historic Places in 1985, as "Anniston Cotton Manufacturing Company". It has also been known as Chalk Line, Inc.

The site was deemed "significant as an example of the spirit of industrialization that grew in the New South following the War Between the States. Built for Anniston's two leading industrialists, Samuel Noble and Alfred Tyler, as a companion industry to the city's growing iron industry and as a source of employment for the wives and children of iron workers, the mill was the first textile mill built in town. The mill also had one of the longest periods of operation of any textile mill within the state, beginning in February 1881 and continuing until its closing in 1977."

Also, "The Anniston Cotton Manufacturing Company building is significant architecturally for the quality of the Italian Renaissance Revival design as used in an industrial building from the period and as one of the oldest extant examples of a cotton mill building in Alabama."

The main building was a three-story brick building.

The complex was demolished as of April 2014, and then became the site of the Calhoun County Human Resources Department.
