= Grace Episcopal Church (Anniston, Alabama) =

Historic church in Alabama, United States

- U.S. National Register of Historic Places
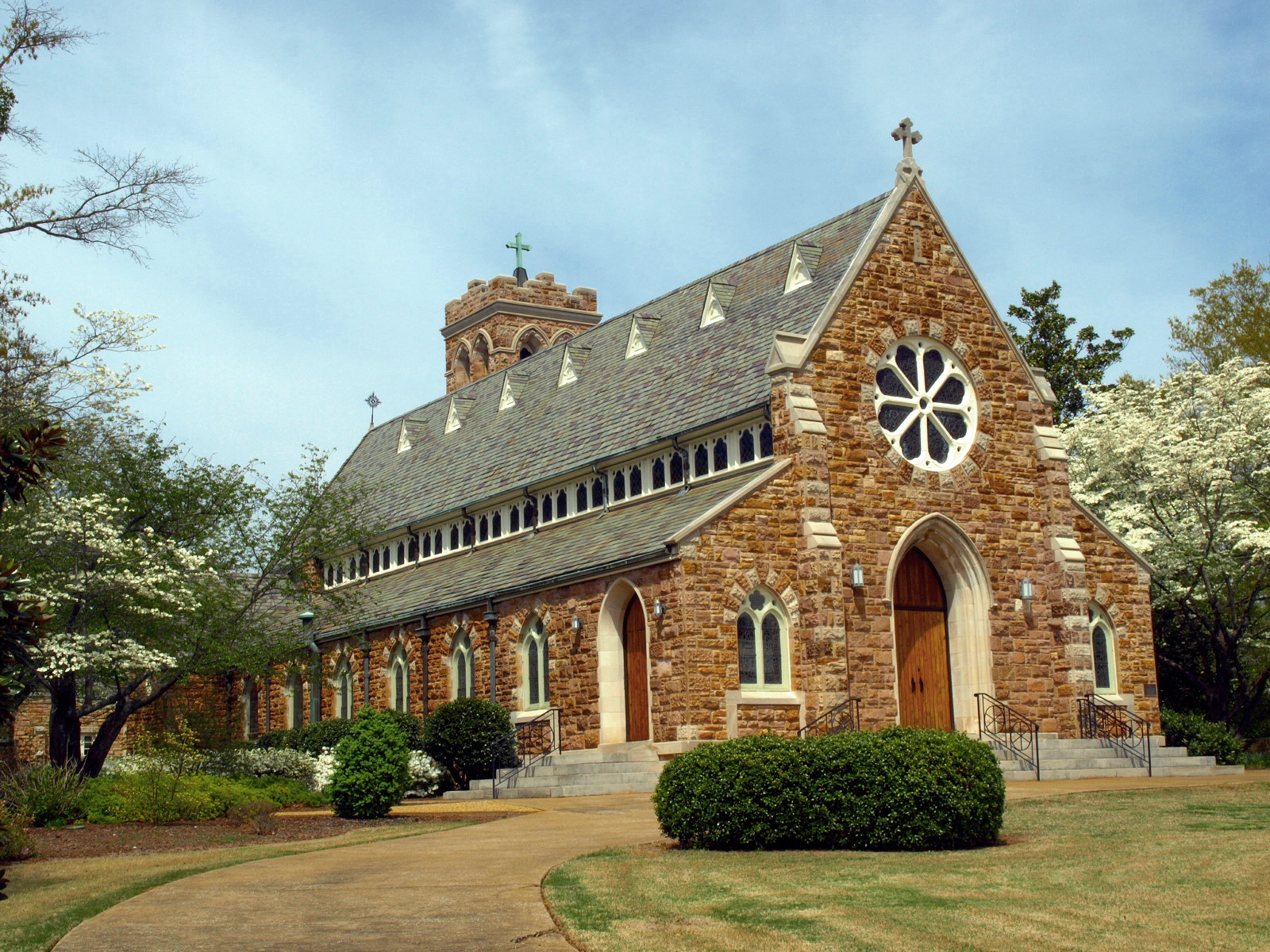
- The church in April 2014

- Location within Alabama Location within the United States
- Location: 1000 Leighton Ave., Anniston, Alabama
- Coordinates: 33°39′27″N 85°49′31″W
- Built: 1882-1885
- NRHP reference No.: 85002869
- Added to NRHP: November 3, 1985

Grace Episcopal Church, located at 1000 Leighton Avenue in Anniston, Alabama, United States, is an historic Gothic Revival church that was added to the National Register of Historic Places on November 3, 1985.

== See also ==
- National Register of Historic Places listings in Calhoun County, Alabama
