= Bagley-Cater Building =

- Bagley–Cater Building
- U.S. National Register of Historic Places
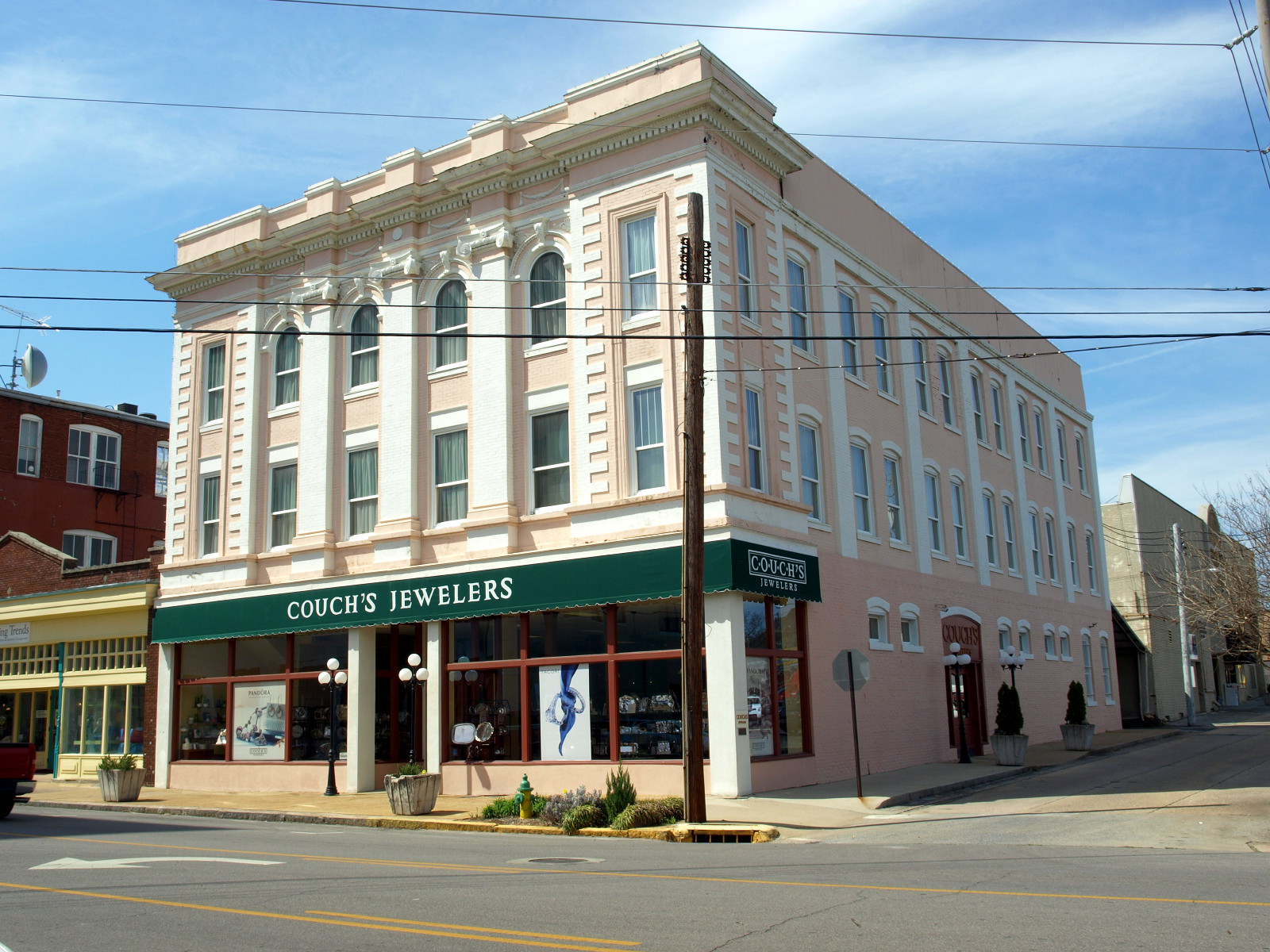

- Location within Alabama Location within the United States
- Location: 15 E. Tenth St., Anniston, Alabama
- Coordinates: 33°39′26″N 85°49′45″W
- Area: less than one acre
- Built: 1908
- Architectural style: Classical Revival
- MPS: Anniston MRA
- NRHP reference No.: 85002864
- Added to NRHP: October 3, 1985

The Bagley–Cater Building, at 15 E. Tenth St. in Anniston, Alabama, United States, is a Classical Revival-style commercial building built in 1908. It was listed on the National Register of Historic Places in 1985.

It was deemed "significant as a well-developed local example of early 20th-century neoclassical commercial architecture. Distinguishing features of the building include the composition of Ionic pilasters and end pavilions with quoining and the fully detailed entablature embellished with swags."

Through 1985 the building had always served as a furniture store: as the Bagley Furniture and Undertaking Company until 1917, as the George Cater Furniture Company, and then as the Rhodes Furniture Company.
