= St. Michael and All Angels Episcopal Church (Anniston, Alabama) =

Historic church in Alabama, United States

- U.S. National Register of Historic Places
- Alabama Register of Landmarks and Heritage
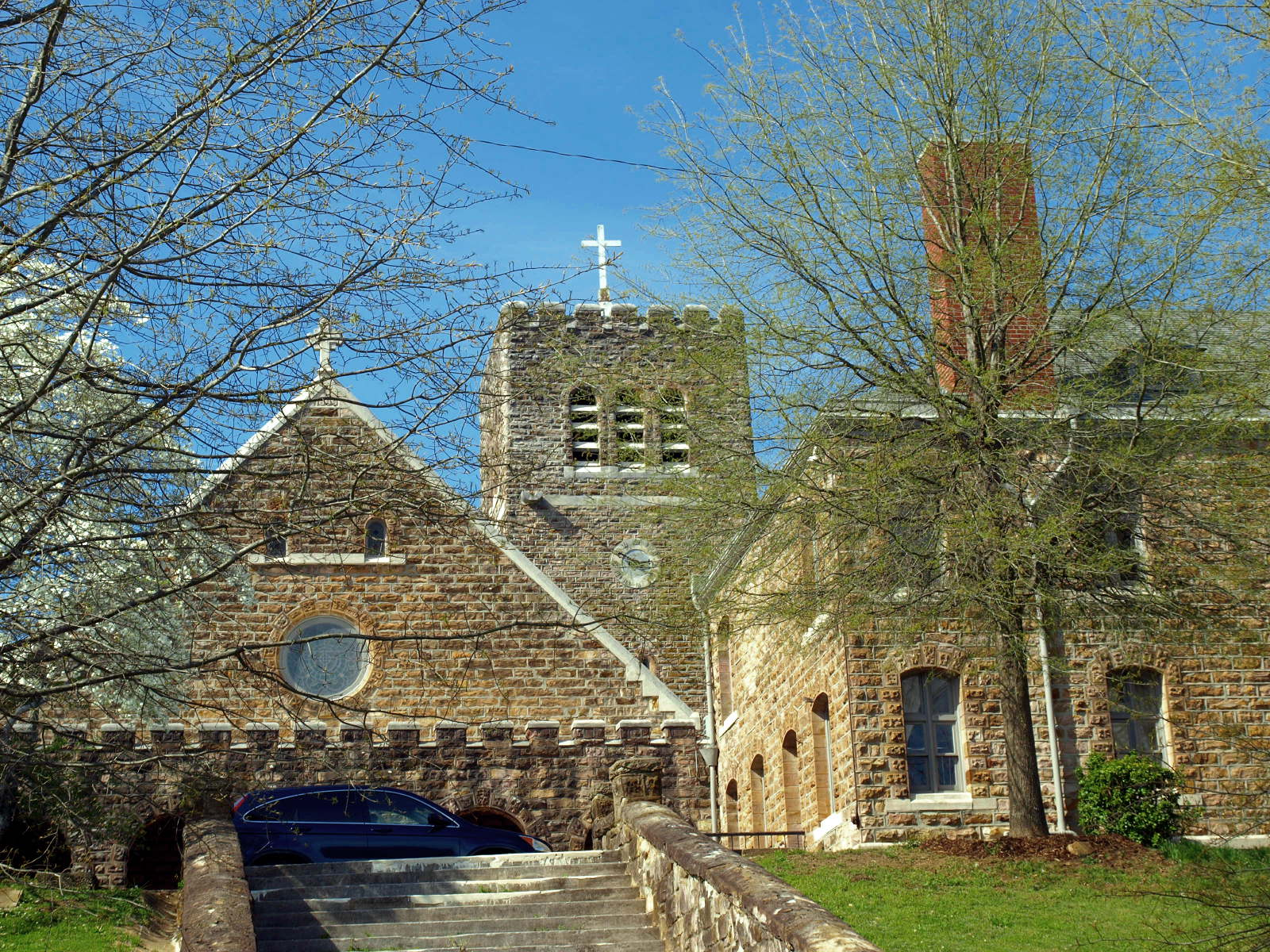
- The church in April 2014

- Location within Alabama Location within the United States
- Location: West 18th Street, Anniston, Alabama
- Coordinates: 33°40′1″N 85°50′37″W
- Built: 1888
- Architect: William Hulsey Wood
- NRHP reference No.: 78000483

Significant dates
- Added to NRHP: February 14, 1978
- Designated ARLH: November 23, 1976

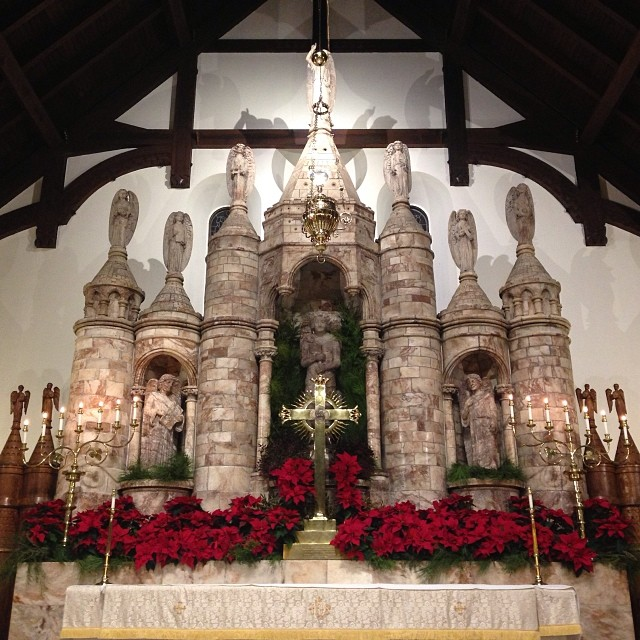
Episcopal Church --- Christmas Eve Midnight Mass 2013 (11pm-12:30am) - taken by Lindsay Ghee

St. Michael and All Angels Episcopal Church is an historic church located at 1000 West 18th Street in Anniston, Alabama, United States, designed by architect William Halsey Wood of Newark, New Jersey. It was added to the Alabama Register of Landmarks and Heritage on November 23, 1976, and to the National Register of Historic Places on March 14, 1978.

== See also ==
- National Register of Historic Places listings in Calhoun County, Alabama
