= Caldwell Building =

- U.S. National Register of Historic Places
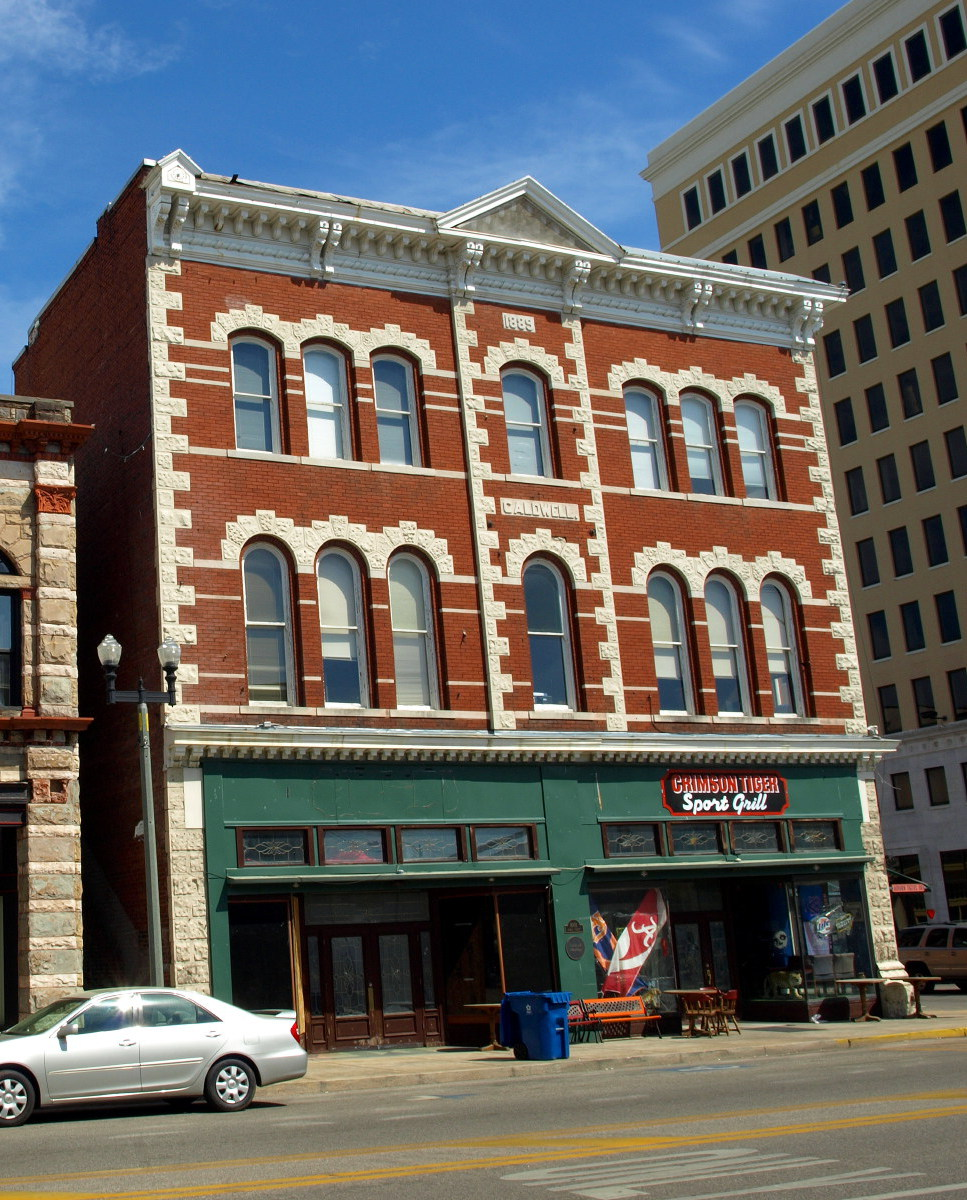

- Location within Alabama
- Location: 1001 Noble St., Anniston, Alabama
- Coordinates: 33°39′25″N 85°49′46″W
- Area: less than one acre
- Built: 1889
- Architectural style: Italianate
- NRHP reference No.: 82001997
- Added to NRHP: March 1, 1982

The Caldwell Building, at 1001 Noble St. in Anniston, Alabama, United States, is a historic building built in Italianate style in 1889. It was listed on the National Register of Historic Places in 1982.

It is a three-story building with red brick and russet colored stone trim. It is located on Lot 1, Block 1, the hub of the business district of Anniston.
