= Parker Memorial Baptist Church =

Historic church in Alabama, United States

- U.S. National Register of Historic Places
- Alabama Register of Landmarks and Heritage
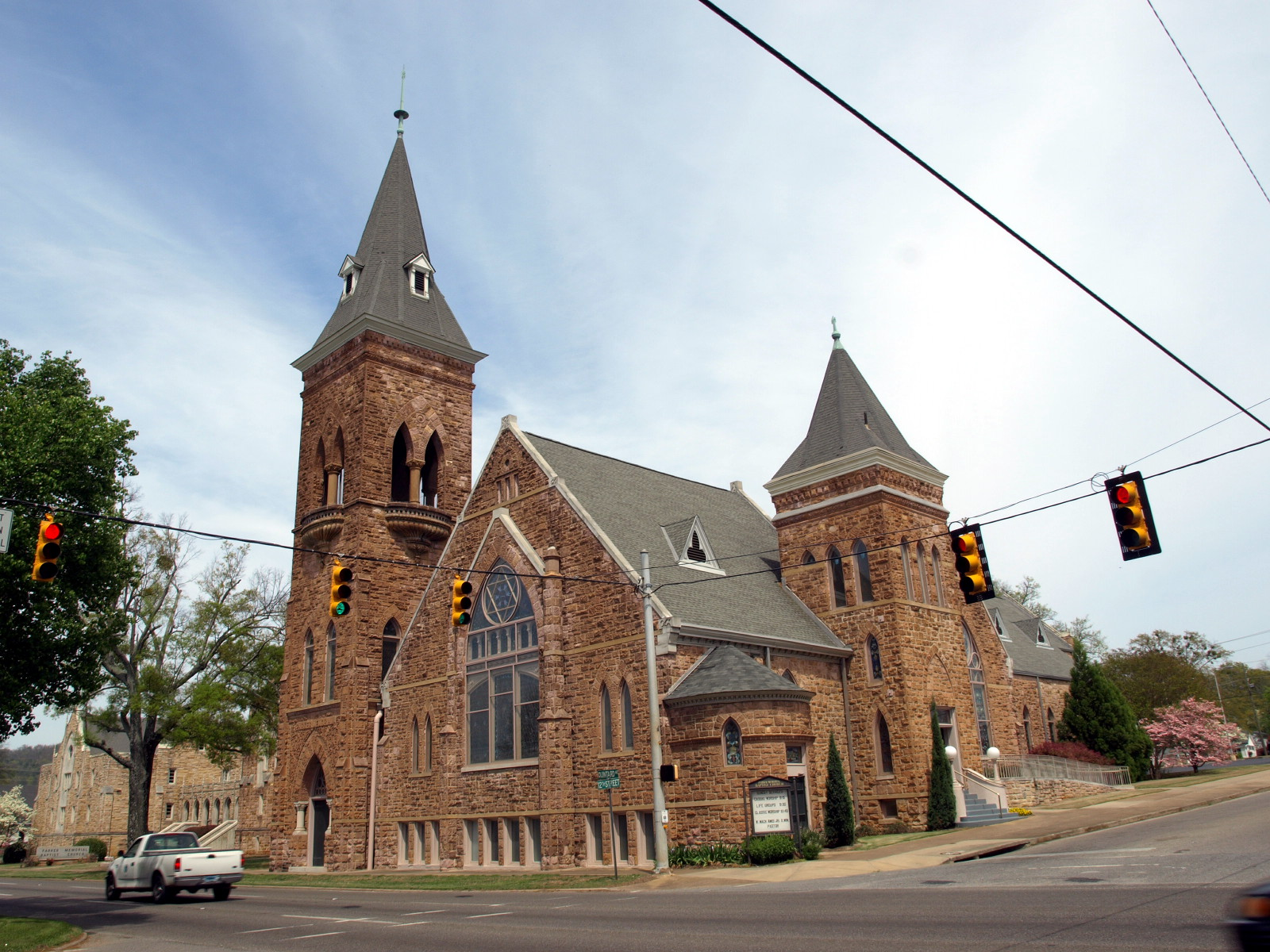
- The church in April 2014

- Location within Alabama Location within the United States
- Location: 1205 Quintard Ave., Anniston, Alabama
- Coordinates: 33°39′36″N 85°49′34″W
- Area: 1.9 acres (0.77 ha)
- Built: 1888
- Architect: Kennerly, George
- Architectural style: Gothic
- MPS: Anniston MRA
- NRHP reference No.: 85002881

Significant dates
- Added to NRHP: October 3, 1985
- Designated ARLH: September 24, 1981

Parker Memorial Baptist Church is a historic Southern Baptist church at 1205 Quintard Avenue in Anniston, Alabama, United States. Built in 1888, it was added to the Alabama Register of Landmarks and Heritage in 1981, and the National Register of Historic Places in 1985.
