= Davis C. Cooper House =

Historic house in Alabama, United States

- U.S. National Register of Historic Places
- Alabama Register of Landmarks and Heritage
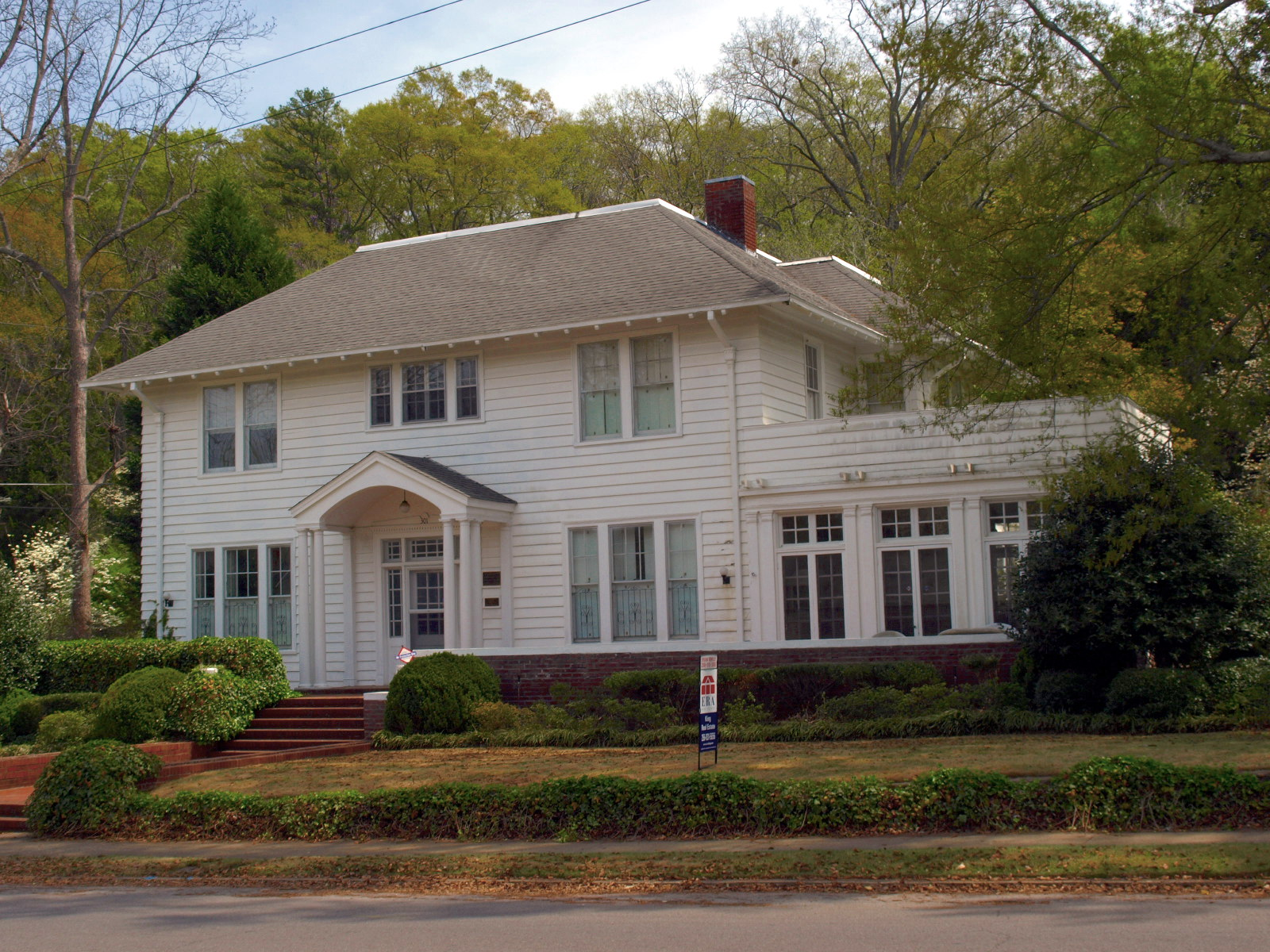
- The house in April 2014

- Location within Alabama Location within the United States
- Location: 301 Main St., Oxford, Alabama
- Coordinates: 33°37′1″N 85°50′3″W
- Area: 1 acre (0.40 ha)
- Built: 1911
- Architectural style: Colonial Revival
- NRHP reference No.: 05000835

Significant dates
- Added to NRHP: August 12, 2005
- Designated ARLH: September 26, 2003

The Davis C. Cooper House is a historic house located at 301 Main Street in Oxford, Alabama, United States.

== Description and history ==
The house was built by Davis Clay Cooper in 1911. Cooper was a prominent local business leader, starting in his father's mercantile business. He later became the president of the Bank of Oxford, and was instrumental in establishing the Blue Springs Cotton Mill and the Oxford Oil Mill, as well as other business ventures. He also served on the city councils of Oxanna (before it merged into Anniston), Anniston, and Oxford, the board of education of Oxford, and was mayor of Oxford for 20 years. The house passed to Cooper's daughter, Annie, upon his death in 1943, and was sold out of the family in the 1970s.

The house is built in a restrained Colonial Revival style, one of few large-scale examples of the style in Oxford. The two-story house has a truncated hipped roof with exposed rafter ends. The main block of the house is three bays wide, with a one-story entry portico supported by two groups of three columns. The front door has twelve panes of glass, and is surrounded by multi-light sidelights and a transom. The portico is flanked by a grouping of three windows, one six-over-one sash window surrounded by two four-over-one sashes on each side. A similar grouping of casement windows sits above the portico, while the outer bays of the second story feature pairs of six-over-one sashes. On the south (right) of the façade is a one-story sunroom topped with a deck. The interior plan is irregular, with rooms surrounding a central stair hall. Interior details are a blend of Colonial Revival and Late Victorian features.

The house was listed on the Alabama Register of Landmarks and Heritage in 2003 and the National Register of Historic Places in 2005. Also contributing to the property are a recreation building (which contains a bowling alley used by the adjacent Baptist church), garage, and gazebo.
