= Piedmont station (Alabama) =

- Southern Railway Depot
- U.S. National Register of Historic Places
- Alabama Register of Landmarks and Heritage
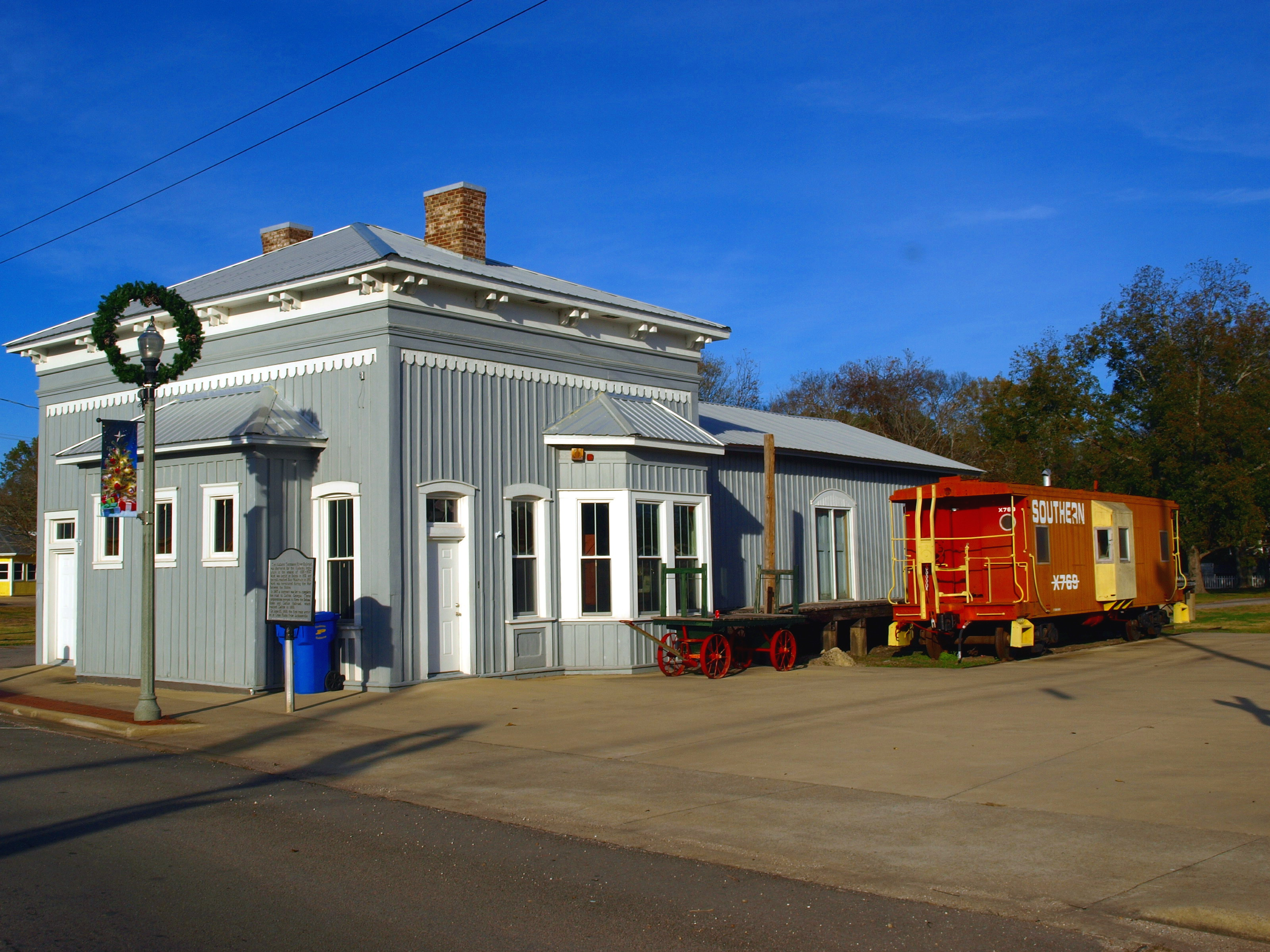
- The depot in November 2017

- Location within Alabama Location within the United States
- Location: 200 N. Center Ave., Piedmont, Alabama
- Coordinates: 33°55′29″N 85°36′40″W
- Built: 1868
- NRHP reference No.: 84000599

Significant dates
- Added to NRHP: January 5, 1984
- Designated ARLH: May 27, 1983

Southern Railway Depot in Piedmont, Alabama, United States, is a station that served the Southern Railway from 1868. It was added to the Alabama Register of Landmarks and Heritage on May 27, 1983, and was listed on the National Register of Historic Places on January 5, 1984.

Preceding station	Southern Railway	Following station
Piedmont Springs toward York	York – Rome	Ladiga toward Rome
