= Watts Building =

Watts Building may refer to:

- Watts Building (Birmingham, Alabama), listed on the NRHP in Alabama
- Watts Building (San Diego, California), listed on the NRHP in California
- Watts Building (Brighton, East Sussex), part of Brighton University
