= William T. Warren =

American architect (1877–1962)

- Born: October 3, 1877; Birmingham, Alabama
- Died: April 14, 1962 (aged 84); Birmingham, Alabama
- Occupation: Architect
- Awards: Fellow, American Institute of Architects (1934)
- Practice: Warren & Welton; Warren & Knight; Warren, Knight & Davis

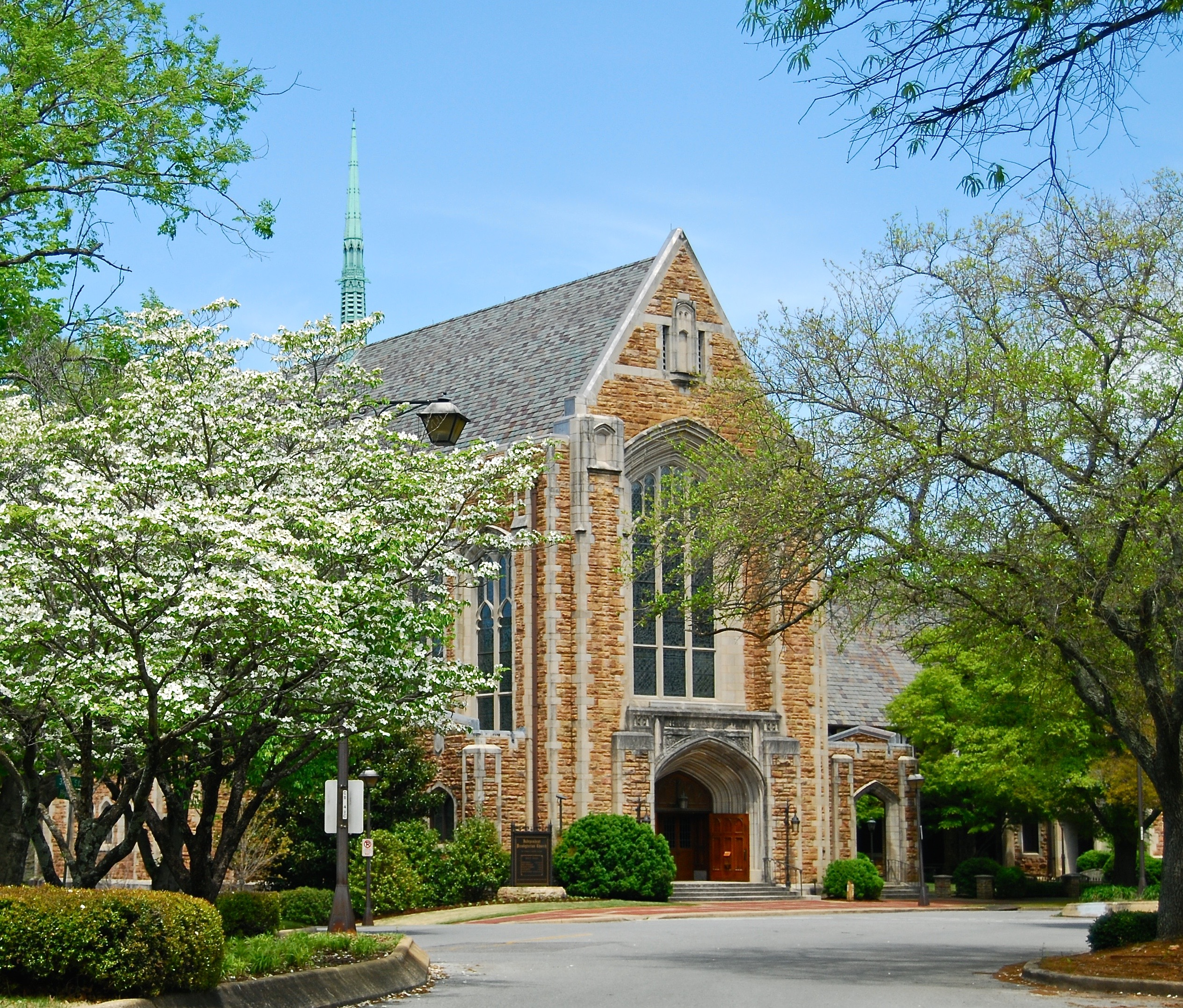
The Independent Presbyterian Church of Birmingham, Alabama, designed by Warren, Knight & Davis and completed in 1926.

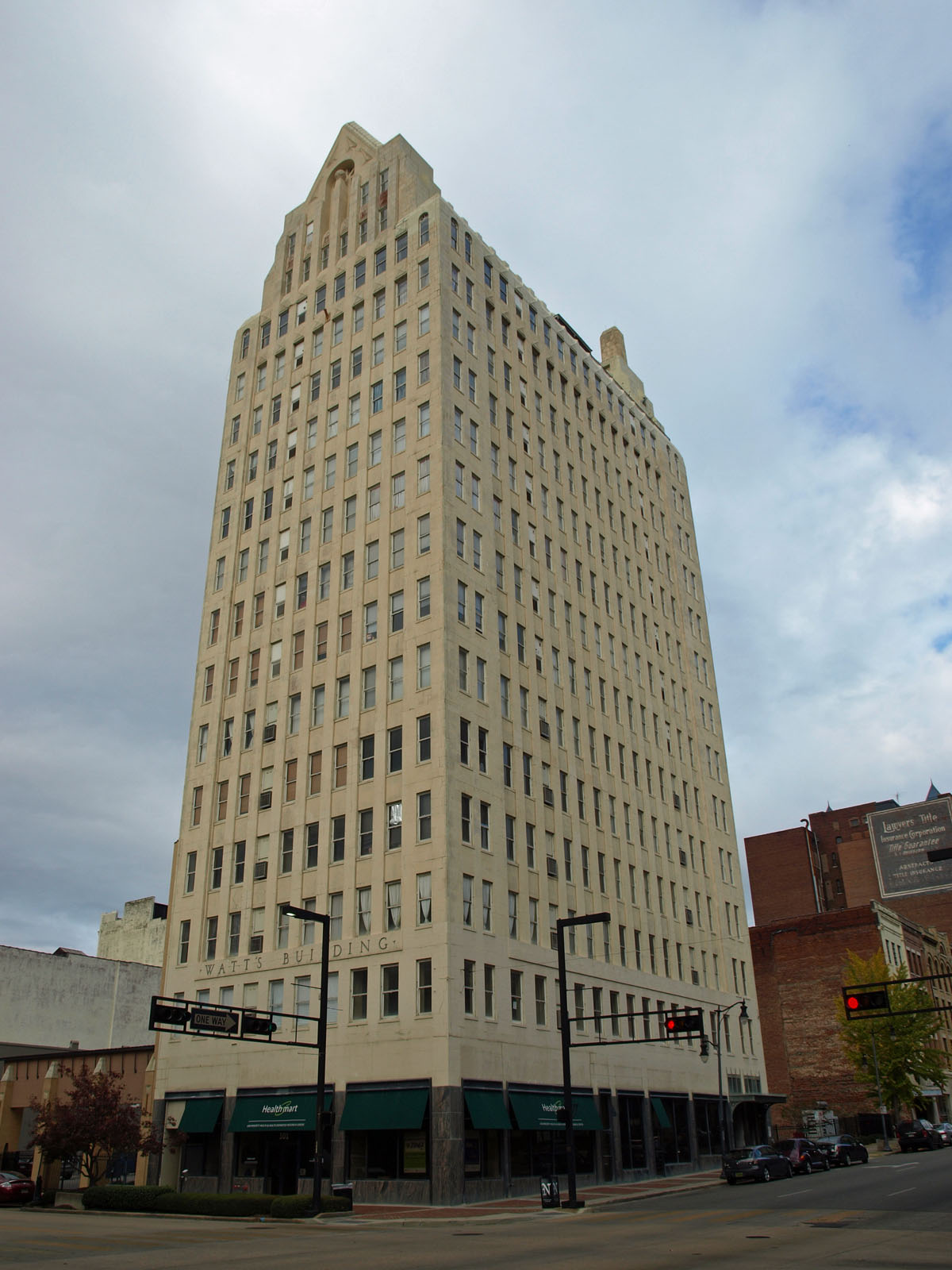
The Watts Building in Birmingham, designed by Warren, Knight & Davis and completed in 1928.

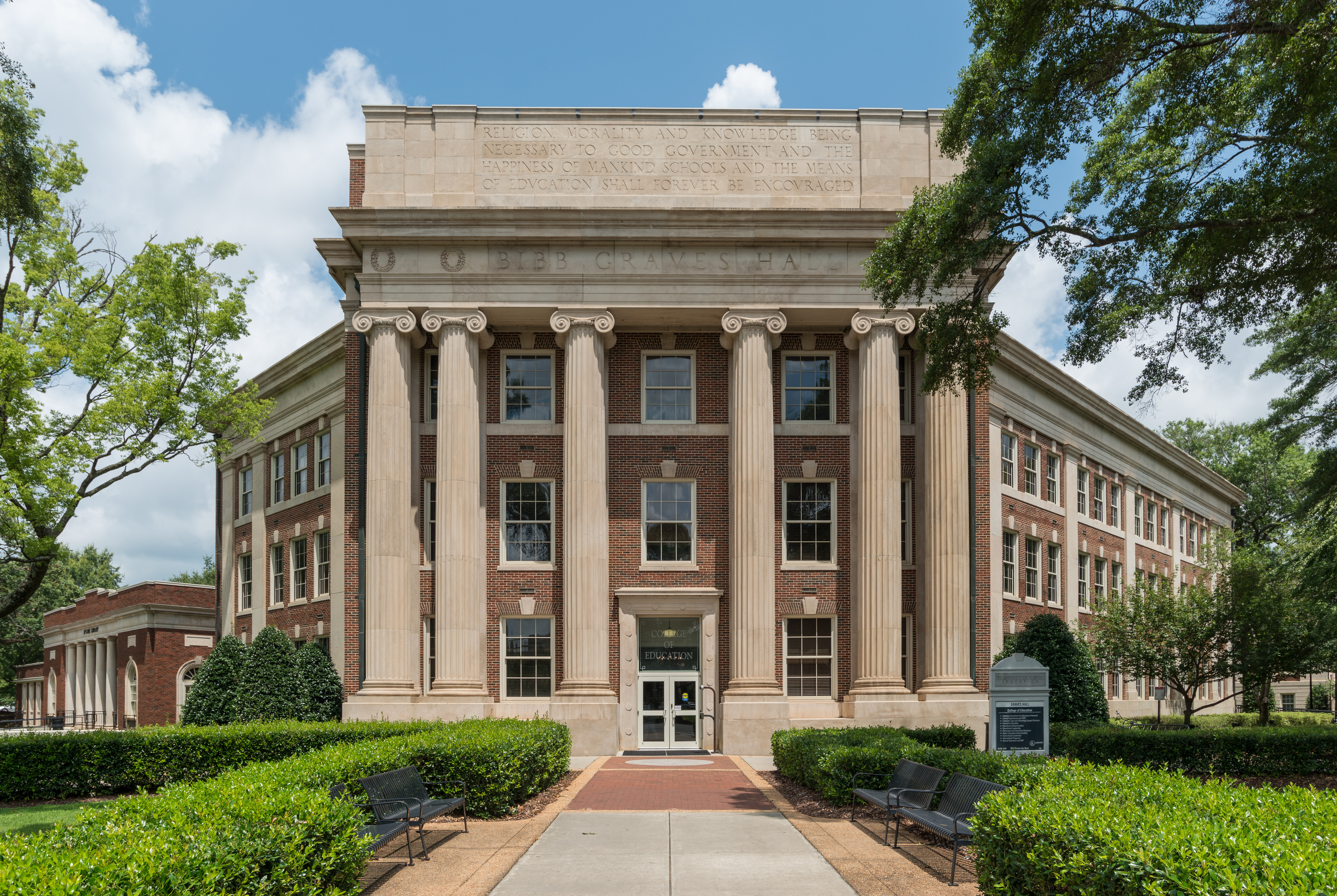
Autherine Lucy Hall of the University of Alabama, designed by Warren, Knight & Davis and completed in 1929.

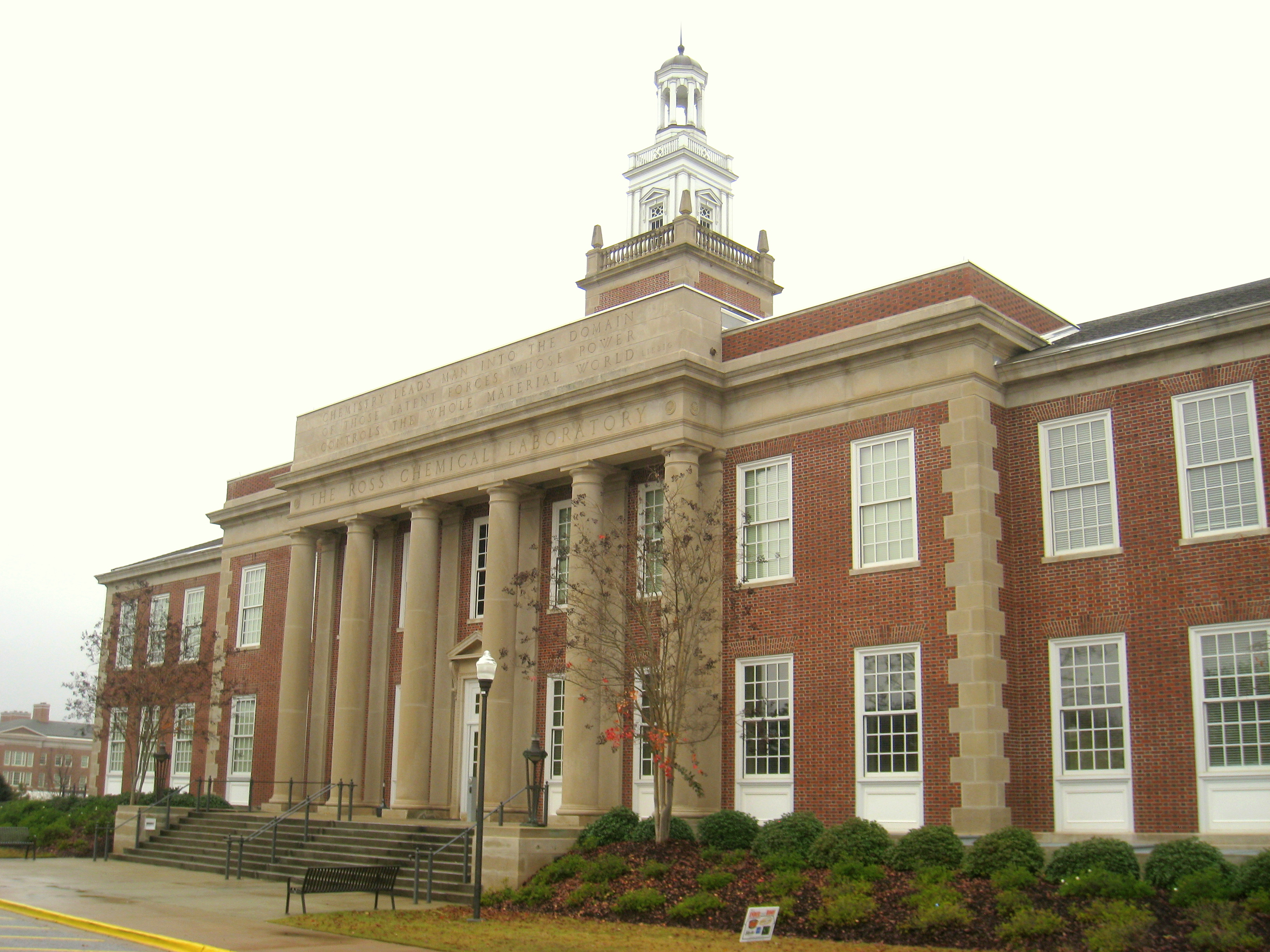
Ross Hall of Auburn University, designed by Warren, Knight & Davis and completed in 1930.

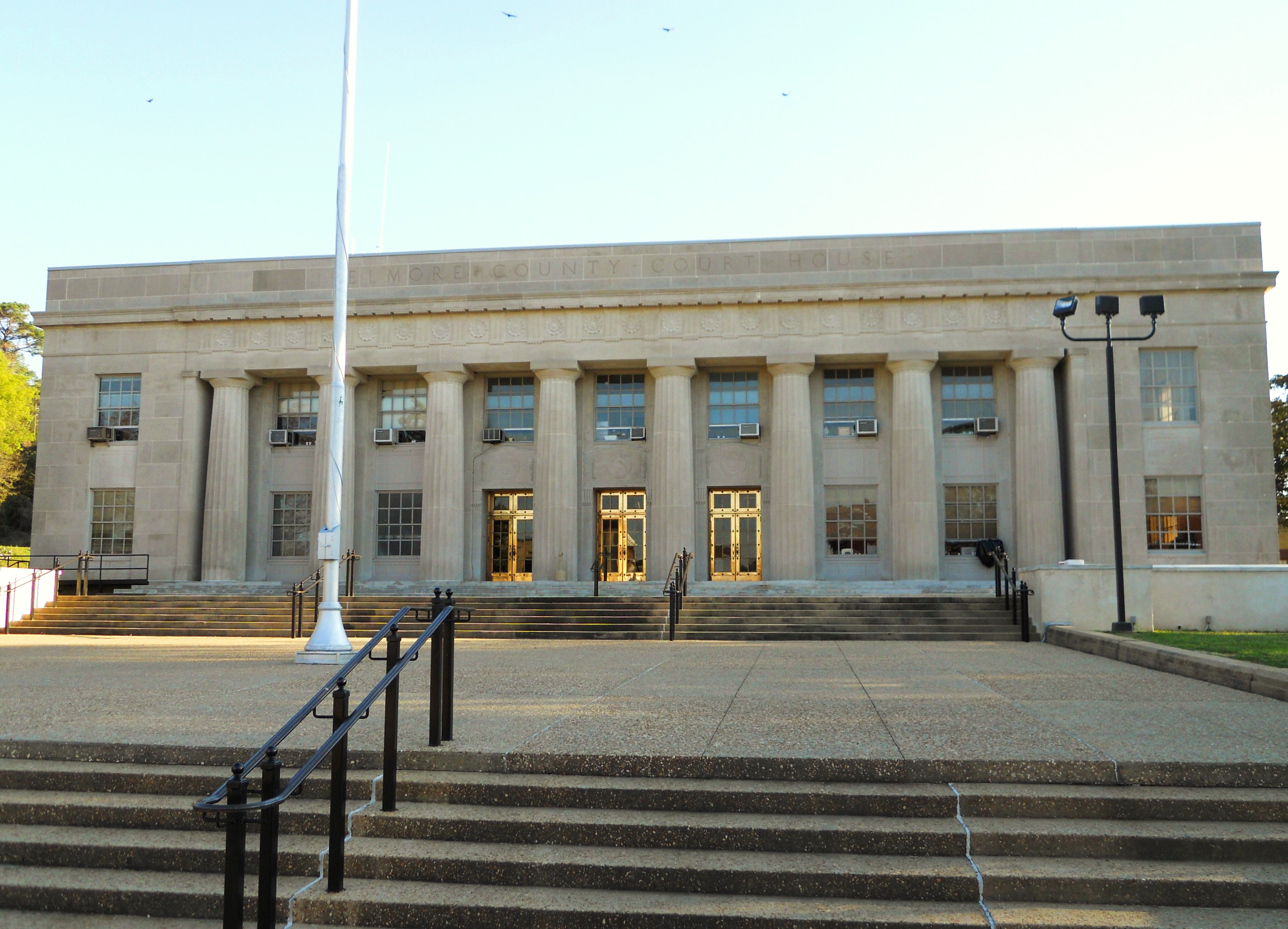
The Elmore County Courthouse in Wetumpka, designed by Warren, Knight & Davis and completed in 1932.

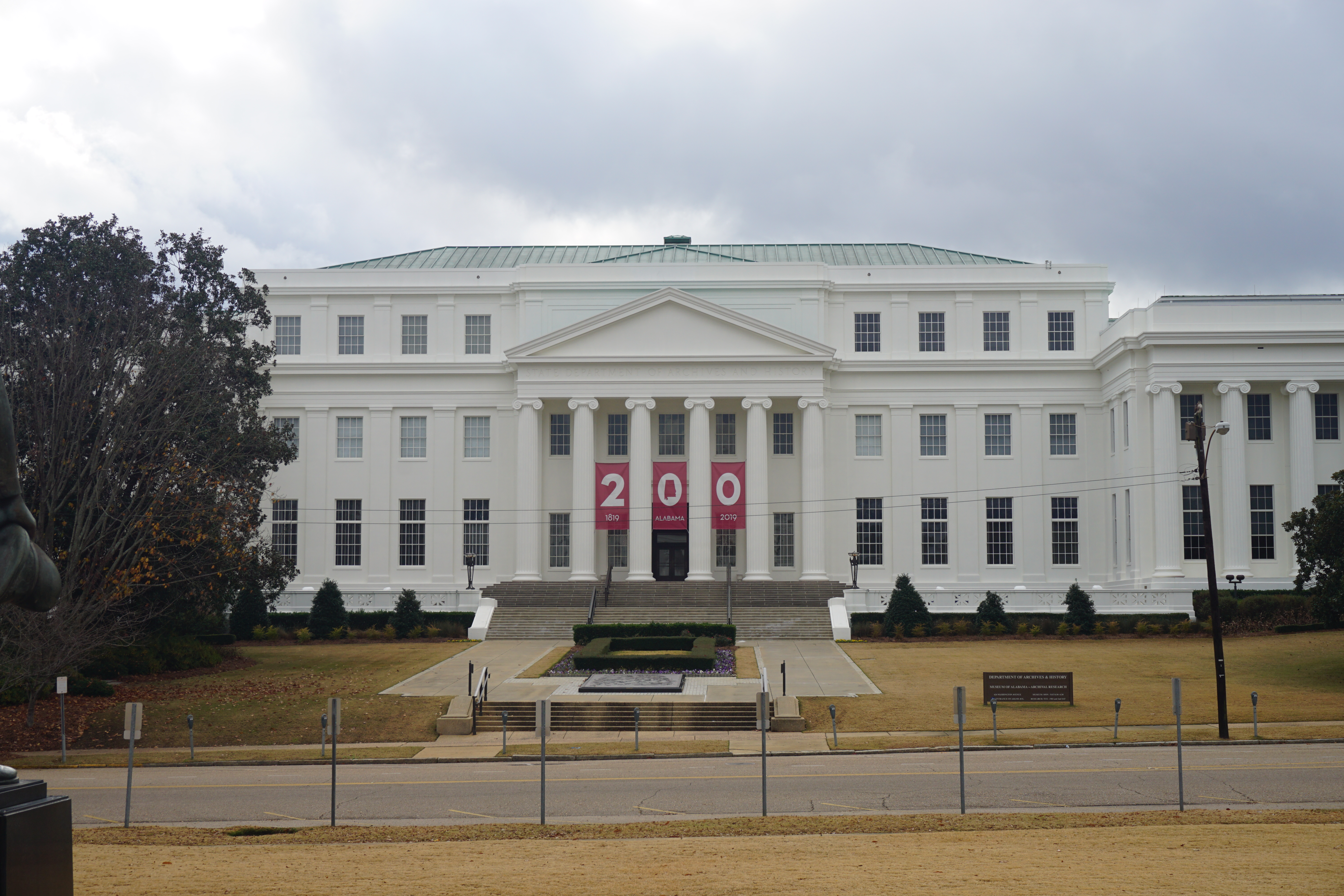
The Alabama Department of Archives and History building in Montgomery, designed by Warren, Knight & Davis and completed in 1940.

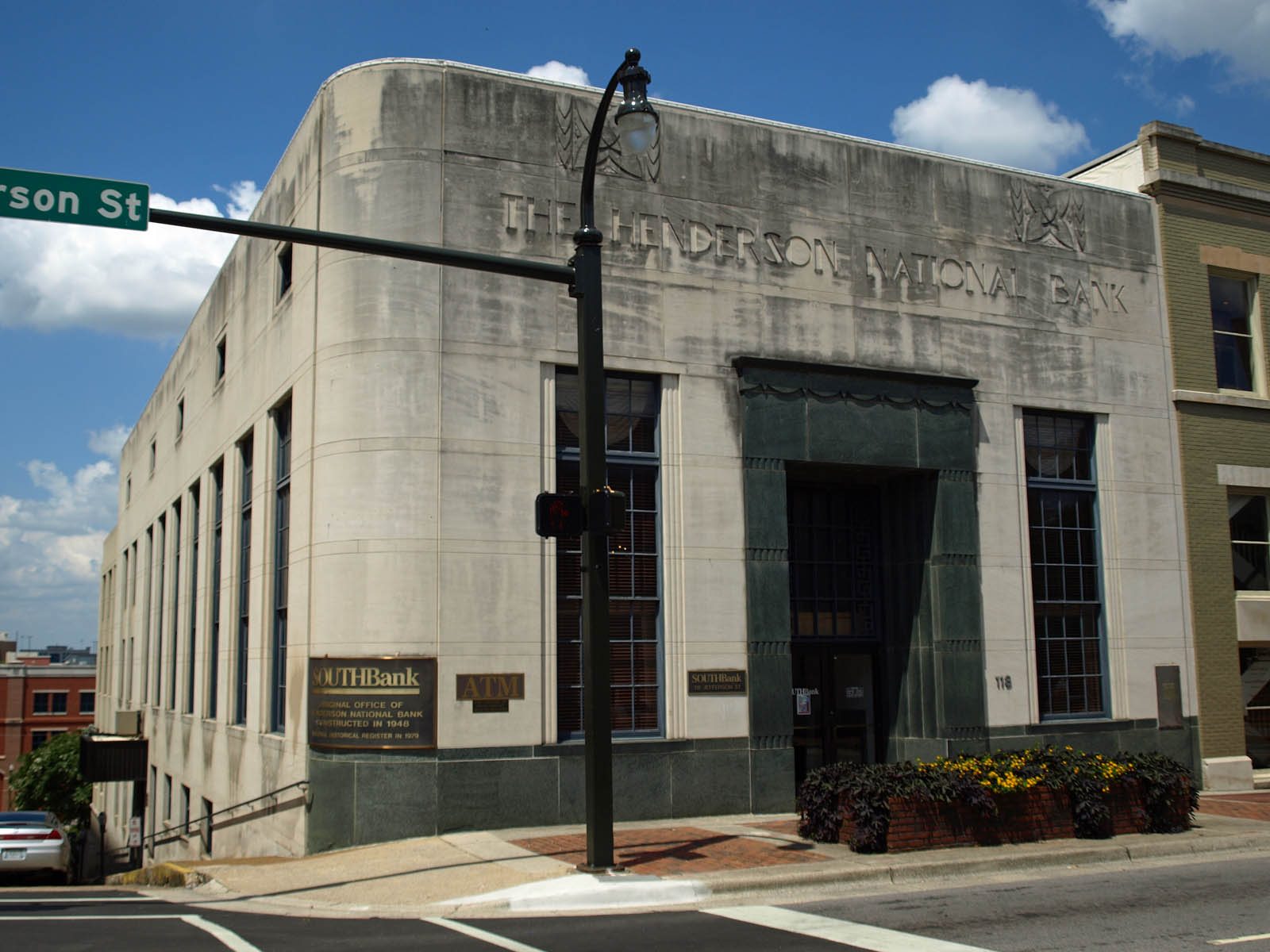
The Henderson National Bank building in Huntsville, designed by Warren, Knight & Davis and completed in 1948.

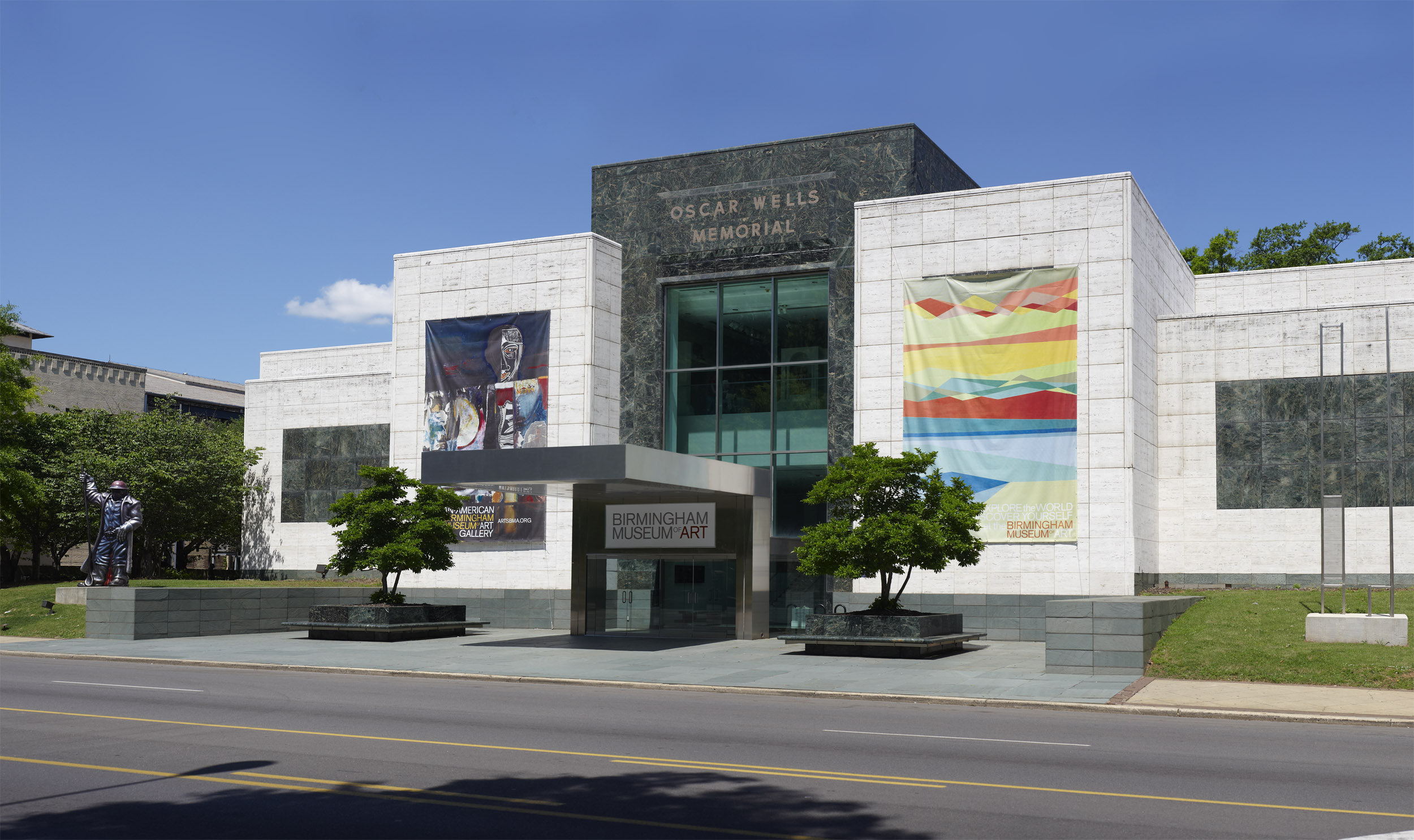
The Birmingham Museum of Art, designed by Warren, Knight & Davis and completed in 1959.

William T. Warren FAIA (October 3, 1877 – April 14, 1962) was an American architect from Birmingham, Alabama. He practiced architecture there from 1907 until his death in 1962. Most of his works were designed in association with Eugene H. Knight FAIA (November 30, 1884 – November 6, 1971), his business partner in the firms of Warren & Knight and Warren, Knight & Davis from 1917 until his death.

== Life and career ==
William Tilman Warren was born October 3, 1877, in Montgomery, Alabama to James Rainey Warren and Fannie Warren, née Leak. He was educated at the Alabama Polytechnic Institute (BS in engineering, 1897) and Columbia University (BS in architecture, 1902). After graduating from Columbia he worked for McKim, Mead & White and Albro & Lindeberg. In 1907 he returned to Birmingham, where he formed the partnership of Warren & Welton with William Leslie Welton. This was dissolved in 1910. In 1917 he formed a second partnership, Warren & Knight, with Eugene H. Knight. This was expanded in 1922 to include John E. Davis and was renamed Warren, Knight & Davis. As originally conceived, Knight was the chief designer, Warren was in charge of production and management and Davis was in charge of construction administration.

In 1946 the partnership was expanded to include Albion K. Knight and John E. Davis Jr., the sons of Knight and Davis. John E. Davis was the first of the name partners to die, in 1961. Warren and Knight followed in 1962 and 1971, respectively. The remaining partners incorporated the firm as Warren, Knight & Davis Inc. in 1976. This was changed to Davis, Black & Associates Inc. in 1987 and to Robert M. Black Architects Inc. in 1991. Bob Black, the last principal of the firm, died in 2004. The firm is no longer active but legally still exists.

He and his firms made significant contributions to the architectural history of Birmingham. Their work was concentrated in Alabama, but they also completed works in Florida, Mississippi and Tennessee. Work in Alabama included many public and private buildings in addition to works for Alabama A&M University, Alabama State University, Auburn University and the University of Alabama. In Florida they completed at least three county courthouses and in Tennessee they worked for Sewanee: The University of the South.

Warren joined the American Institute of Architects in 1916, as a charter member of the Alabama chapter. He served as a chapter president and on the AIA board of directors. He was elected a Fellow in 1934 and was the first Alabama architect to be elected a Fellow under the modern system instituted in 1898. His partner, Eugene H. Knight, would also be elected a Fellow in 1952.

== Personal life ==
Warren was married to Dorothea Orr in 1912. They had two children, Dorothea (Dorothy) and William Tilman Jr. (Bill). He died April 14, 1962, at the age of 84.

Warren was a member of the Birmingham Country Club, the Birmingham Chamber of Commerce and the Birmingham Little Theatre.

== Legacy ==
At least six buildings designed by Warren and his partners have been listed on the United States National Register of Historic Places, and others contribute to listed historic districts.

The Birmingham Public Library has a collection of his papers. In 2017 he was inducted into the Birmingham Business Hall of Fame.

== Architectural works ==
=== Warren & Welton, 1907–1910 ===
- 1908 – Smith Hall, Auburn University, Auburn, Alabama
- 1909 – Wesleyan Hall annex, University of North Alabama, Florence, Alabama

=== William T. Warren, 1910–1916 ===
- 1914 – Kilby House, (Note: NRHP-listed.) 1301 Woodstock Ave, Anniston, Alabama
- 1917 – Calkins Hall, University of Montevallo, Montevallo, Alabama

=== Warren & Knight, 1916–1922 ===
- 1919 – John W. Ager house, 1100 31st St S, Birmingham, Alabama
- 1922 – Independent Presbyterian Church church school, (Note: Designed by Warren & Knight and Miller & Martin, associated architects.) (Note: A contributing resource to the Chestnut Hill Historic District, NRHP-listed in 1987.) 3100 Highland Ave, Birmingham, Alabama

=== Warren, Knight & Davis, from 1922 ===
- 1923 – William T. Warren house, (Note: The architect's own home. A contributing resource to the Milner Heights Historic District, NRHP-listed in 2003.) 1445 Milner St S, Birmingham, Alabama
- 1925 – Alabama Power Headquarters Building, 600 18th S N, Birmingham, Alabama
- 1925 – Birmingham Athletic Club (former), (Note: A contributing resource to the Downtown Birmingham Historic District, NRHP-listed in 1982 and expanded in 1985, 1998 and 2016.) 309 23rd St N, Birmingham, Alabama
- 1926 – Bottega Favorita, 2240-2244 Highland Ave, Birmingham, Alabama
- 1926 – Federal Reserve Bank of Atlanta Birmingham Branch, 1801 5th Ave N, Birmingham, Alabama
- 1926 – Independent Presbyterian Church, 3100 Highland Ave, Birmingham, Alabama
- 1926 – Walton County Courthouse, (Note: Designed by Warren, Knight & Davis, architects, with Chandler C. Young, associate architect.) 571 E Nelson Ave, De Funiak Springs, Florida
- 1927 – Fire Station No. 3, 2210 Highland Ave, Birmingham, Alabama
- 1927 – Gulf County Courthouse (former), 222 N 2nd St, Wewahitchka, Florida
- 1927 – Virginia Samford Theatre, (Note: A contributing resource to the Hanover Place Historic District, NRHP-listed in 2003.) 1116 26th St S, Birmingham, Alabama
- 1928 – Foley Hotel, (Note: The architect's own home. A contributing resource to the Foley Downtown Historic District, NRHP-listed in 2005.) 113-121 W Laurel Ave, Foley, Alabama
- 1928 – Protective Life Building, 2027 1st Avenue N, Birmingham, Alabama
- 1928 – Jo Ann Gibson Robinson Hall, (Note: A contributing resource to the Alabama State University Historic District, NRHP-listed in 1998.) (Note: Formerly named for Bibb Graves.) Alabama State University, Montgomery, Alabama
- 1928 – Singer Building, 2008 2nd Ave N, Birmingham, Alabama
- 1928 – Watts Building, 2008 3rd Ave N, Birmingham, Alabama
- 1929 – John E. Davis house, (Note: Home of Warren's business partner. A contributing resource to the Red Mountain Suburbs Historic District, NRHP-listed in 1985.) 2935 Carlisle Rd, Birmingham, Alabama
- 1929 – Autherine Lucy Hall, University of Alabama, Tuscaloosa, Alabama
- 1929 – Theodore Swann house, 3526 Redmont Rd, Birmingham, Alabama
- 1930 – W. H. Councill Hall, (Note: A contributing resource to the Alabama Agricultural and Mechanical University Historic District, NRHP-listed in 2001.) Alabama A&M University, Huntsville, Alabama
- 1930 – Drake Dining Hall, Alabama A&M University, Huntsville, Alabama
- 1930 – Walter S. Buchanan Hall, Alabama A&M University, Huntsville, Alabama
- 1930 – Ross Hall, Auburn University, Auburn, Alabama
- 1932 – Elmore County Courthouse, 100 E Commerce St, Wetumpka, Alabama
- 1937 – Alabama State Office Building, 500 Dexter Ave, Montgomery, Alabama
- 1937 – Atlas Cement Company office building, Birmingham, Alabama
- 1937 – Lawrence County Courthouse, 14330 Court St, Moulton, Alabama
- 1939 – Beverly Hall, Alabama State University, Montgomery, Alabama
- 1940 – Alabama Department of Archives and History building, 624 Washington Ave, Montgomery, Alabama
- 1940 – Franklin County Courthouse, 33 Market St, Apalachicola, Florida
- 1948 – Henderson National Bank building, 118 S Jefferson St, Huntsville, Alabama
- 1948 – Hurt Hall, (Note: Demolished. Formerly a contributing resource to the Alabama Agricultural and Mechanical University Historic District, NRHP-listed in 2001.) Alabama A&M University, Huntsville, Alabama
- 1948 – North Dining Hall, (Note: Demolished. Formerly a contributing resource to the Alabama State University Historic District, NRHP-listed in 1998.) Alabama State University, Montgomery, Alabama
- 1948 – Pratt School addition, 306 Ave U, Birmingham, Alabama
- 1950 – Frank Lewis Gymnasium, Alabama A&M University, Huntsville, Alabama
- 1959 – Birmingham Museum of Art, 2000 Reverend Abraham Woods Jr Blvd, Birmingham, Alabama

Additional private homes designed by Warren and his partners contribute to the NRHP-listed Country Club Historic District, Hanover Place Historic District, Milner Heights Historic District and Red Mountain Suburbs Historic District.
