= Coleman Coliseum =

Arena at the University of Alabama in the US

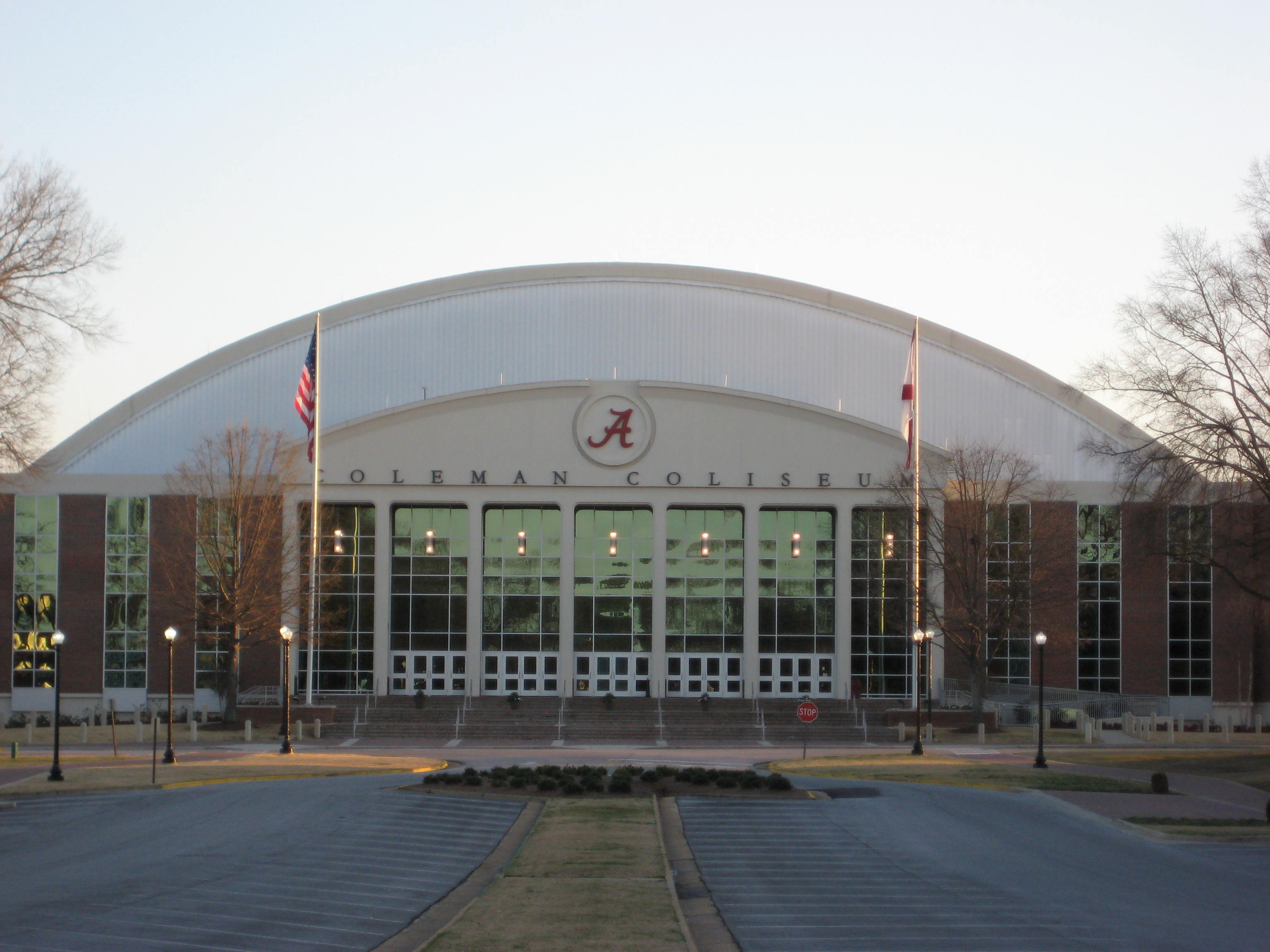
- Interactive map of Coleman Coliseum
- Former names: Memorial Coliseum (1968–1988); University Field House (planning)
- Location: 1201 Coliseum Circle; Tuscaloosa, Alabama 35487
- Coordinates: 33.202939°N 87.539706°W
- Owner: University of Alabama
- Operator: University of Alabama
- Capacity: 15,383 (basketball); 15,075 (gymnastics)
- Surface: Multi-surface

Construction
- Groundbreaking: August 1965
- Opened: January 30, 1968
- Renovated: 2005
- Cost: $4.2 Million ($38.9 million in 2025 dollars)
- Architects: Miller, Martin & Lewis; Edwin T. McCowan
- Structural engineer: Ammann & Whitney
- Services engineer: James D. Scrivner
- General contractor: Daniel Construction Co.

Tenants
- Alabama Crimson Tide (basketball & gymnastics)

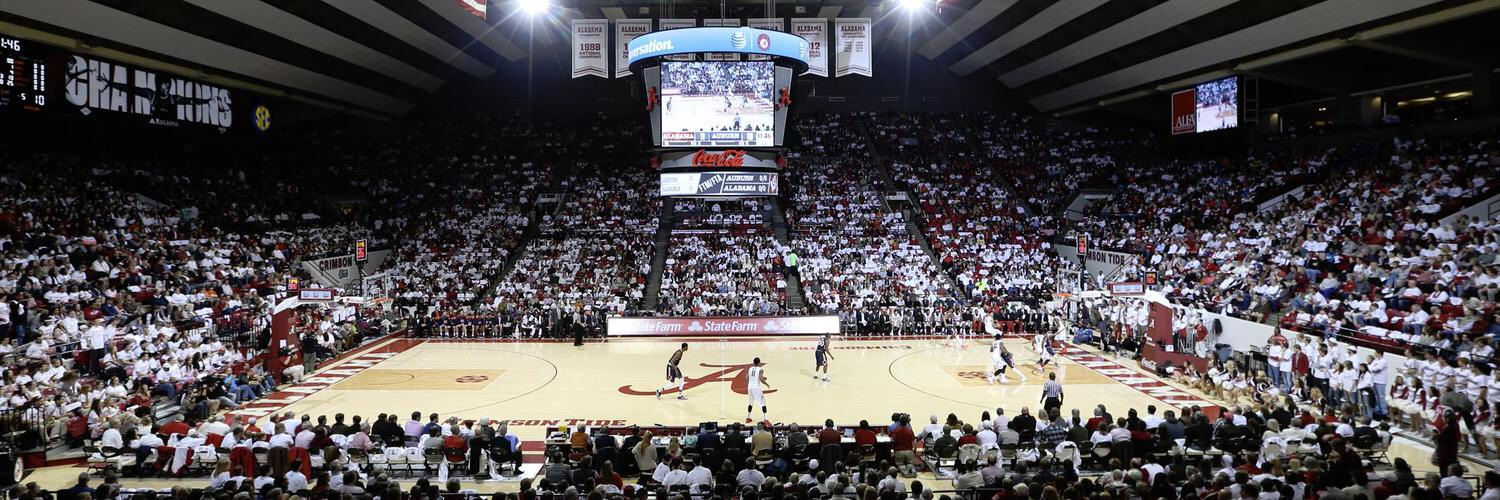
Coleman Coliseum during the 2015 Iron Bowl of Basketball.

Coleman Coliseum is a 15,383-seat multi-purpose arena in Tuscaloosa, Alabama, on the campus of the University of Alabama. It is the current home of the Alabama Crimson Tide men's and women's basketball and women's gymnastics teams, and previously served as the home of the women's volleyball program. Opened in 1968 as Memorial Coliseum as a replacement for Foster Auditorium (the current name was adopted in 1988), the coliseum is located at the center of the University of Alabama's athletic complex, which also includes Sewell–Thomas Stadium, Sam Bailey Track & Field Stadium, the Hank Crisp Indoor Facility, the Mal M. Moore Athletic Facility and the football building and practice fields.

In addition to its primary duties as an athletic facility, the coliseum has on numerous occasions served as a venue for artistic performances, musical concerts, and presidential appearances.

== History ==
Coleman Coliseum is named for Jefferson Jackson Coleman, a prominent University of Alabama alumnus. Jefferson Coleman was the first pledge of Theta Sigma Fraternity that would later become the basis for starting the current National Delta Chi Fraternity Chapter at The University on February 12, 1927. Jefferson went on to serve The university in many capacities, from Business Manager of the football team to Director of Alumni Affairs, for almost 50 years. Until his death in 1995, he was the only person that had attended every Alabama bowl game, starting with the Rose Bowl on January 1, 1926. In 1988, The university honored him by renaming Memorial Coliseum after him. In addition, he served Delta Chi nationally by serving in various positions, most notably as “AA” from 1954 to 1956. For his meritorious and inconspicuous service, Jeff was inducted into The Order of the White Carnation.

The coliseum opened its doors for the first time on January 30, 1968, for the traveling Broadway show The Roar of the Greasepaint - The Smell of the Crowd. Two days later, the men's basketball team hosted its game at the arena, against the Mississippi State Bulldogs.

On November 14, 1971, Elvis Presley performed an afternoon show at the arena. He returned to the arena on June 3, 1975. The last time he performed at the arena was on August 30, 1976, a year before he died. Led Zeppelin performed a sold-out show at Memorial Coliseum on May 10, 1973, the fourth stop on their 1973 North American tour.

On May 17, 1977, the Grateful Dead played a two set (plus encore) show at the venue, their one and only appearance in Tuscaloosa.

President Ronald Reagan visited Coleman Coliseum during his 1984 presidential re-election campaign.

Since the City of Tuscaloosa does not have a municipal civic center, the demand for events grew rapidly and the Coliseum doubled its capacity in the 1970s due to this.

In the 1990s, marquee concerts and events that the arena had seen in the previous two decades grew scarce as the facility became more outdated and became mostly devoted to Crimson Tide athletic events. In the hope that the university could pull more excitement for events at the facility, the Coliseum underwent a significant renovation in 2005, which cost over $24 million.

Coleman Coliseum is also noted for the historic Alabama-LSU basketball game that took place on February 7, 1970. LSU's Pete Maravich scored a career-high 69 points in a 106–104 loss to Alabama. Maravich came into the game against Alabama with two pulled muscles and late in the contest, he injured an ankle. Despite the injuries, LSU's senior guard scored 47 points in the second half to finish with 69, setting an NCAA record for most points against a Division I opponent. Maravich broke the record of 68 established by Niagara's Calvin Murphy 14 months earlier. Maravich completed 26 of 57 field goals (45.6 percent) and completed 17 of 21 free throws (81.0 percent). After the game, Maravich pursued a fan before being restrained. Press Maravich, LSU's coach and Pete's father, stated that the fan had hit Pete on the back. Maravich's record lasted almost 21 years, until Kevin Bradshaw of US International scored 72 against Loyola Marymount on January 5, 1991.

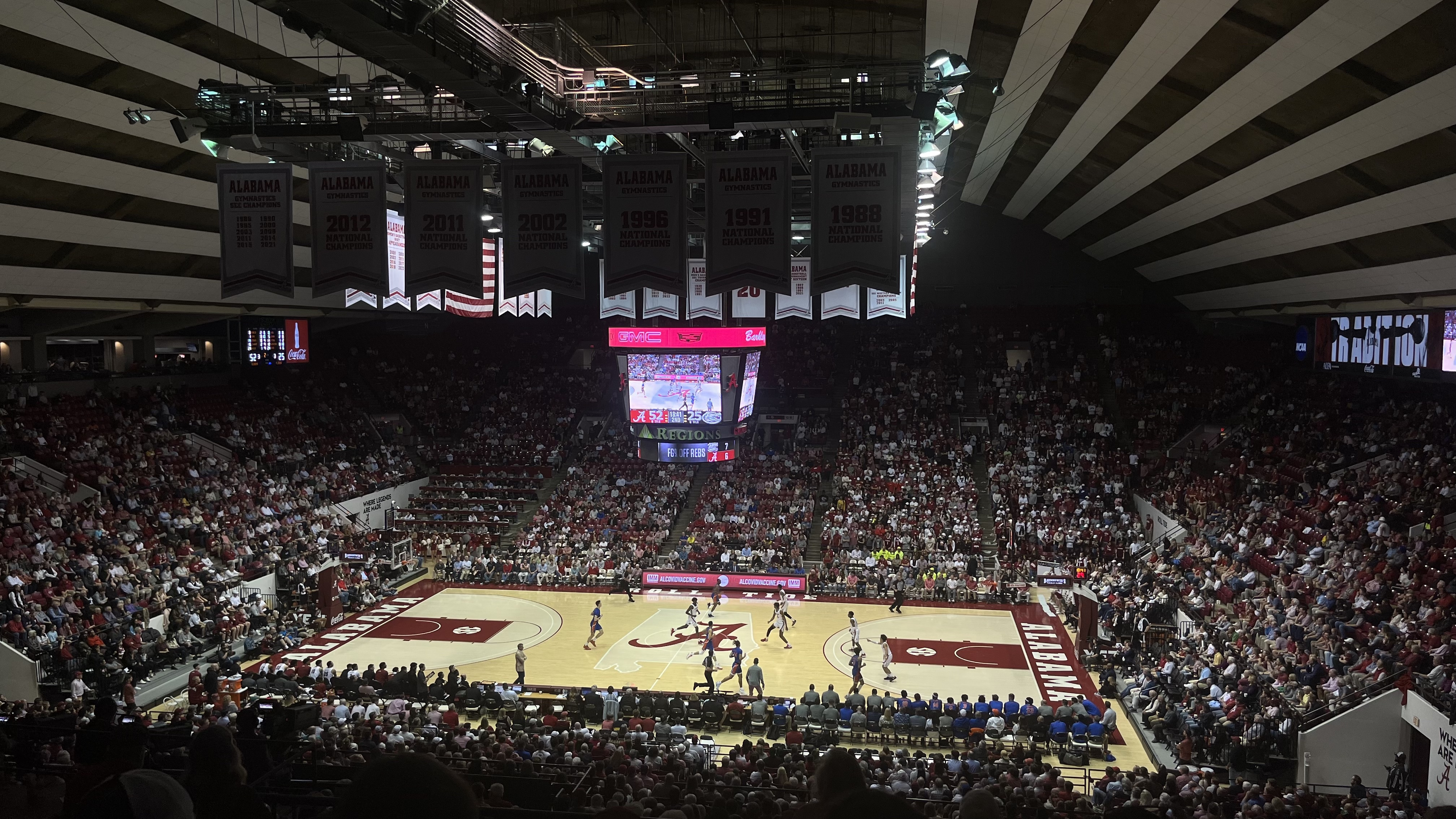
SEC men's basketball game in Coleman Coliseum

== Uses and features ==
Effective with the 2016–17 school year, Coleman Coliseum is home to both Crimson Tide basketball teams, as well as the women's gymnastics team. The women's basketball team, which played at Foster Auditorium in its first season of 1974–75, began splitting home games between the two venues the following season, and moved its entire home schedule to the Coliseum in 1981. The team returned to Foster late in the 2010–11 season, and used that venue as its regular home until returning to the Coliseum in 2016.

Women's volleyball, which also originally called Foster Auditorium home, moved to the Coliseum in 1995. In 2000, the team moved to the "CAVE" (Coleman Auxiliary Volleyball Extension), and it returned to Foster Auditorium in 2011.

In addition to sports, Coleman Coliseum has been used for other events including concerts (seating capacity 16,000), commencement ceremonies, alumni gatherings, student convocations, operas, ballets and political rallies. The Coliseum has been used as an annual bass tournament weigh-in spot, and a Travis Tritt music video was filmed here. The stadium hosted the NCAA Basketball Tournament three times, as a regional site in 1974 and as a sub-regional in 1975 and 1981.

The Coliseum houses the athletic department offices for all varsity sports with three exceptions. The women's basketball and volleyball offices are located at Foster Auditorium while the football offices are housed in the Mal M. Moore Athletic Facility. It features an elegant suite that serves as the President's reception area, an equipment room, weight rooms, a steam bath, a training room, food service areas, the athletic department's photo studio, and locker room for staff and the athletes.

Coleman is also home to the UA athletic department's ticket office.

It is recognizable on television for its "striped" ceiling (a result of bands of acoustical tiles) and the two scoreboards behind each end line, both of which intersperse ads, video boards and scoring information with the familiar "R-O-L-L T-I-D-E" in large illuminated letters. The letters formerly served as a noise meter during games, with the "E" in "TIDE" being red, as a sort of overload light. Now, all eight letters on both ends are constantly illuminated, and the final E is white, like the rest of the letters. Before the 2009–10 season, the facility underwent major renovations and these boards were removed and replaced with a center-hung scoreboard.

== See also ==
- List of NCAA Division I basketball arenas
