= Miller & Martin (architects) =

American architectural firm

Miller & Martin Miller, Martin & Lewis McCowan & Knight Knight Associates

Practice information
- Partners: John A. Miller AIA; Hugh Martin FAIA; James A. Lewis AIA; Edwin T. McCowan AIA; William P. Knight AIA
- Founders: John A. Miller AIA; Hugh Martin FAIA
- Founded: 1900
- Dissolved: 1998
- Location: Birmingham, Alabama

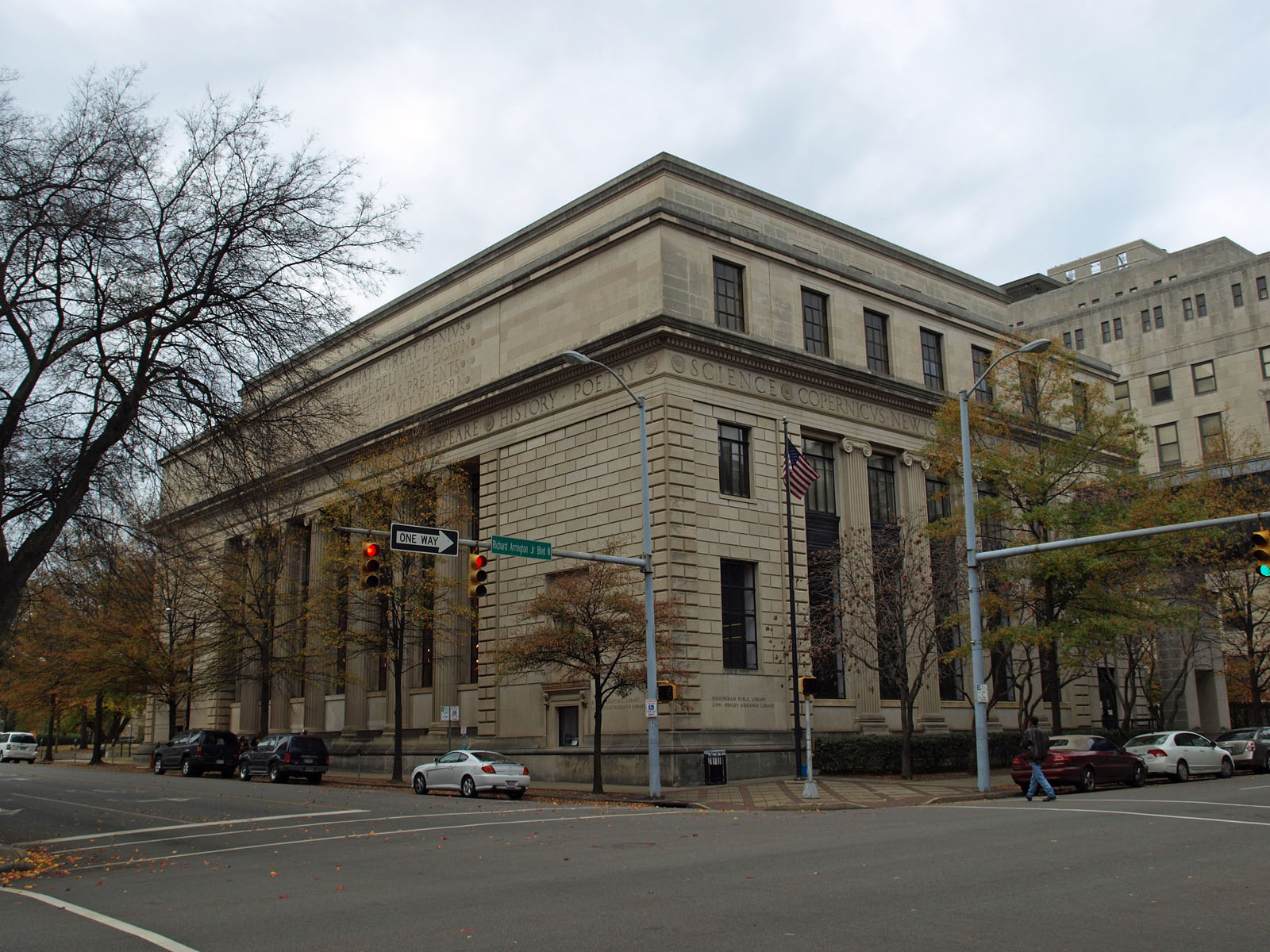
The former Birmingham Public Library, designed by Miller & Martin and completed in 1927.

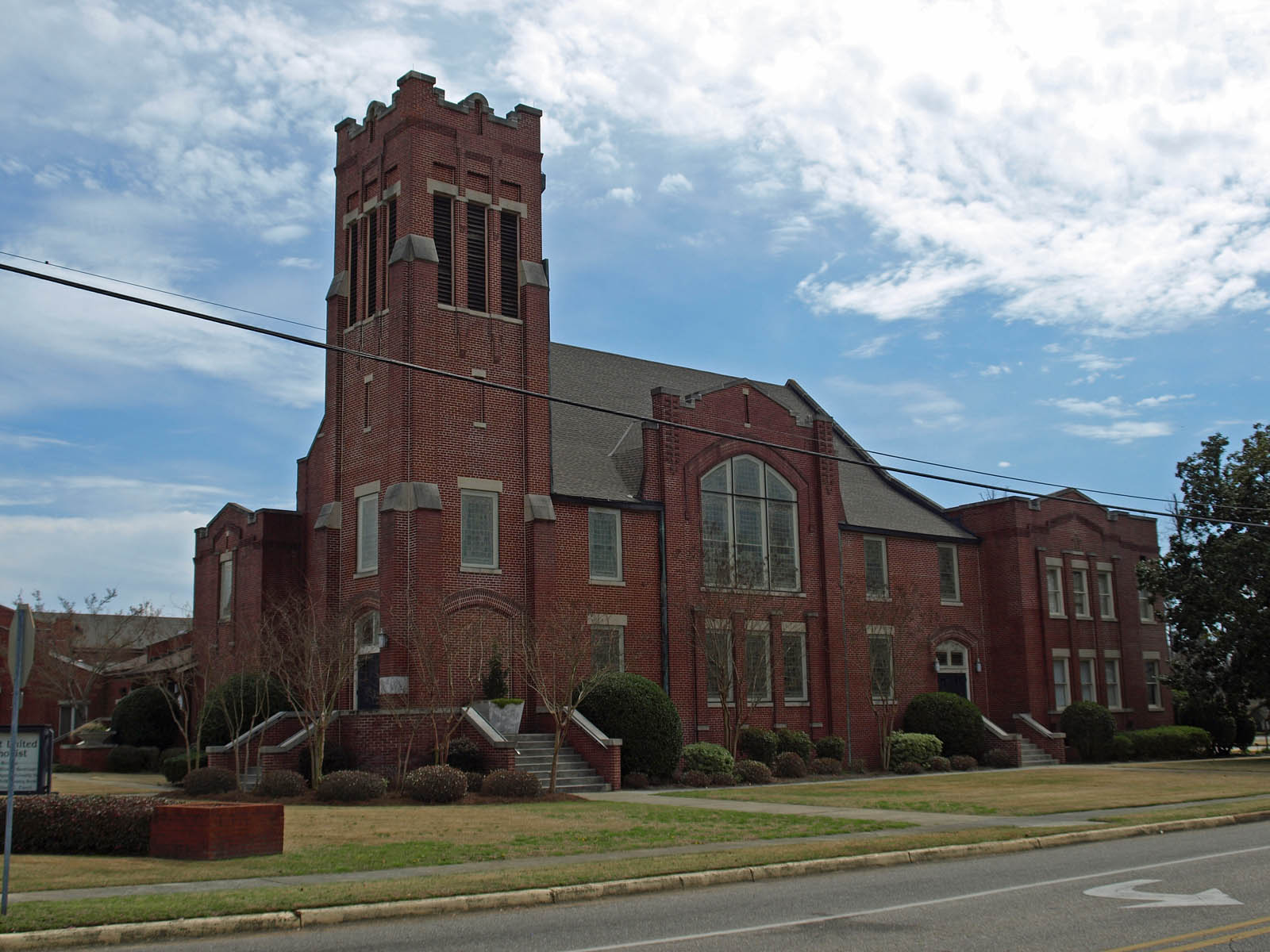
The First Methodist Church in Prattville, Alabama, designed by Miller & Martin and completed in 1913.

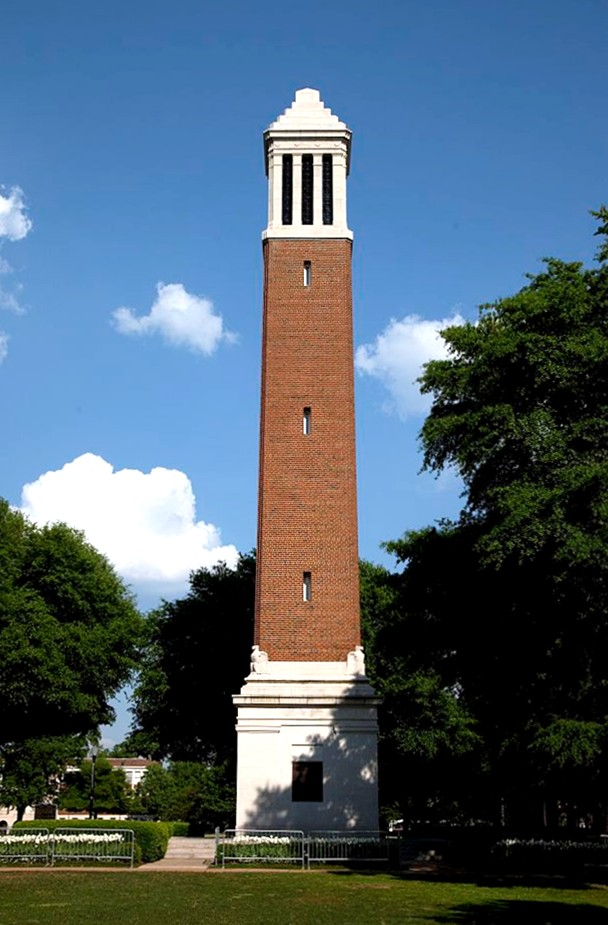
Denny Chimes of the University of Alabama, designed by Miller & Martin and completed in 1929.

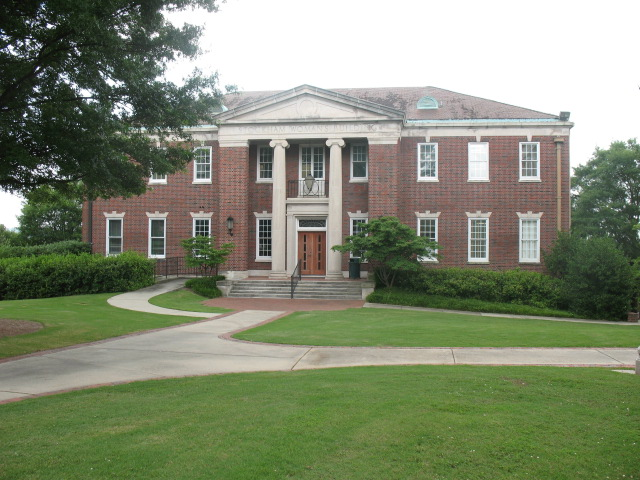
The Stockham Building of the former Birmingham–Southern College, designed by Miller & Martin and completed in 1931.

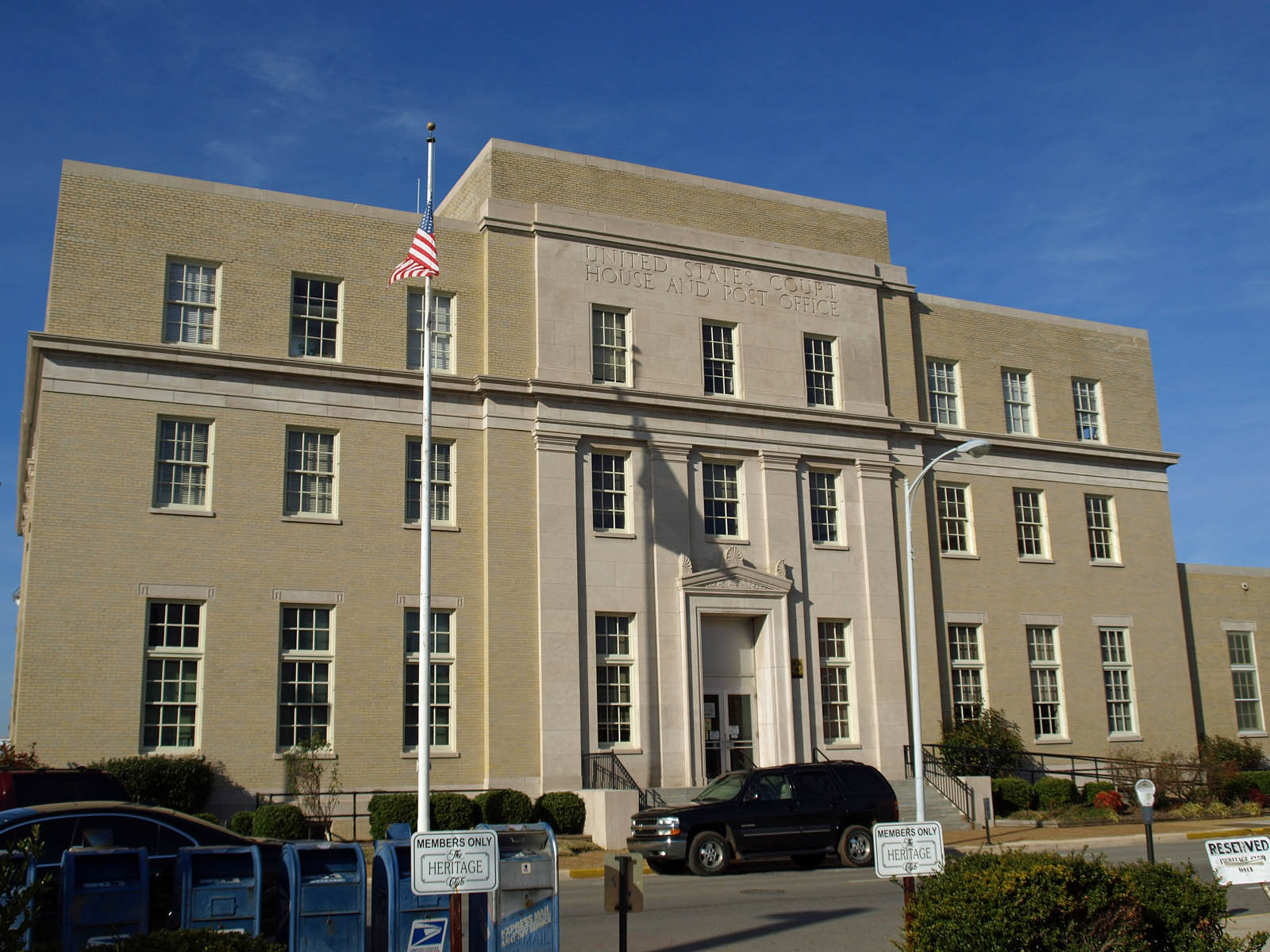
The former United States Courthouse and Post Office in Huntsville, designed by associated architects Edgar Lee Love and Miller, Martin & Lewis and completed in 1936.

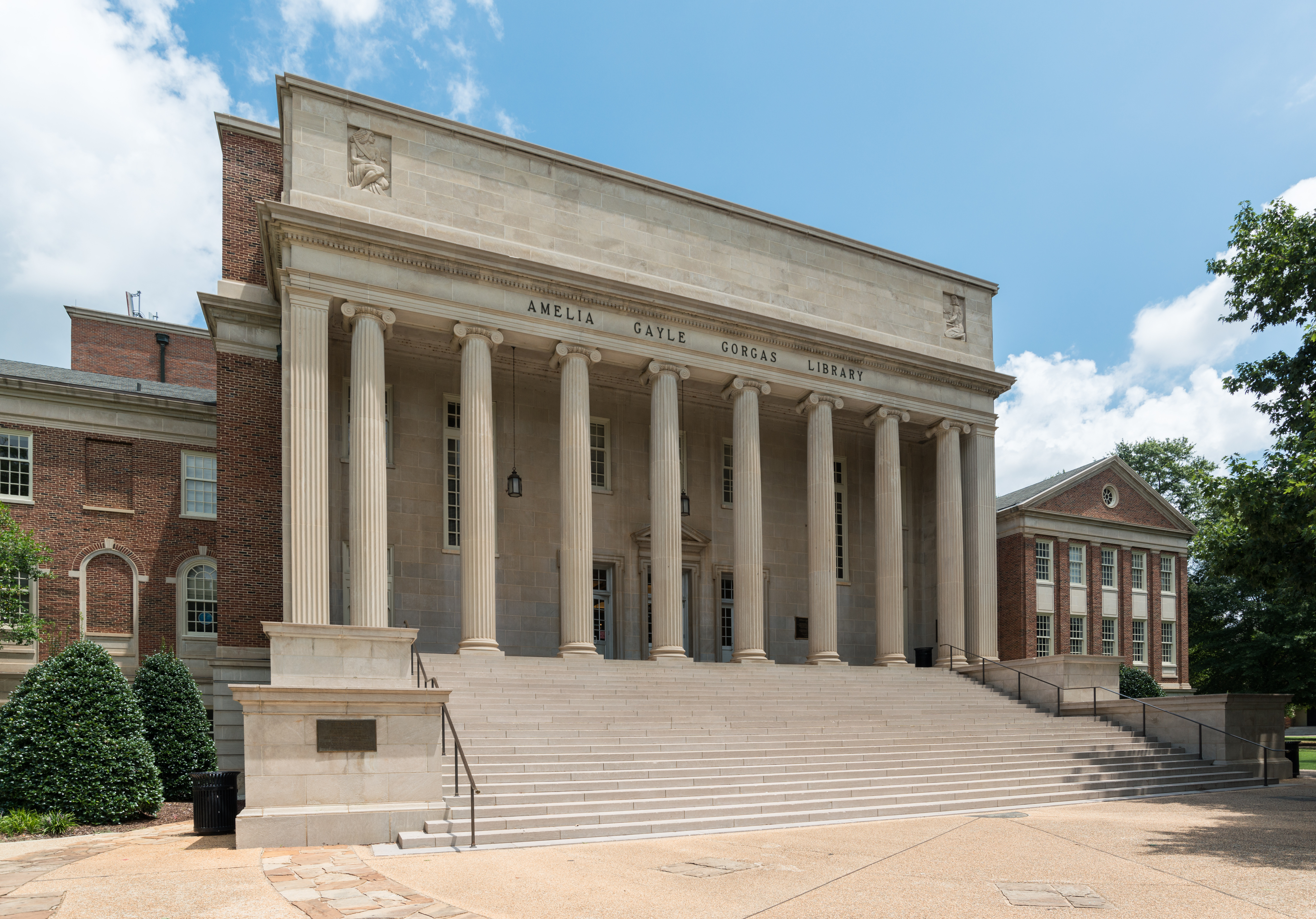
The Amelia Gayle Gorgas Library of the University of Alabama, designed by Miller, Martin & Lewis and completed in 1939.

Miller & Martin, known after 1935 as Miller, Martin & Lewis, was an American architectural firm established in 1900 in Birmingham, Alabama. The founding partners were John A. Miller AIA and Hugh Martin FAIA, who developed a successful regional practice. After their retirements and deaths the firm was continued by their successors, James A. Lewis AIA, Edwin T. McCowan AIA and William P. Knight AIA until its eventual dissolution in 1998, at which time it was the oldest architectural firm in Alabama.

== History ==
The partnership of Miller & Martin was formed in Birmingham, Alabama in 1900 by architects John A. Miller and Hugh Martin, who had met in New York City in the 1890s while working for architect R. H. Robertson. The partners had a general practice and are best remembered for their churches, libraries and college buildings. Between the world wars they were the primary architects for the University of Alabama. Including fraternity and sorority houses in addition to academic buildings such as the Amelia Gayle Gorgas Library (1939), Miller & Martin and Miller, Martin & Lewis completed over seventy works on and around the campus.

Miller and Martin were both involved in the organization of the architectural profession in Alabama. In 1911 they were among the founders of the Birmingham Society of Architects and in 1916 were charter members of AIA Alabama, the state's American Institute of Architects (AIA) chapter.

In 1926 the partnership was expanded to include James A. Lewis. Miller died in 1932, and Martin and Lewis continued the firm under the Miller & Martin name until 1935, when they renamed it Miller, Martin & Lewis. Martin retired from the partnership in 1952. Lewis continued the firm in partnership with Edwin T. McGowan under its same name. Lewis died in 1958 and Martin died in 1959, seven years after his retirement. At the time of his death Martin was regarded as the dean of Alabama architects. He was also recognized nationally, having been elected a Fellow of the AIA in 1942. McCowan continued the firm after their deaths as Miller, Martin & Lewis, Edwin T. McCowan. He dropped the name Miller, Martin & Lewis in 1966 and formed the partnership of McCowan & Knight with William P. Knight.

The notable works of the successor firm included continuing work at the University of Alabama, including ten Hoorn Hall (1963), Coleman Coliseum (1968) and the Rose Administration Building (1969). McCowan withdrew from the firm in the 1970s and Knight incorporated the firm as Knight Associates Inc. in 1975. When Knight died in 1997, Knight Associates was acknowledged as the oldest architectural firm in Alabama. It was dissolved in 1998.

== Partner biographies ==
=== John A. Miller ===
John Alexander Miller AIA (September 12, 1862 – April 19, 1932) was born in Glasgow, Scotland. He was educated and trained there and in London. He worked in Johannesburg and Bloemfontein in South Africa before immigrating to the United States, where he settled in New York City, where he worked for Robertson and others, including Henry Atterbury Smith. In 1900 he moved to Birmingham to join Martin.

Miller was married to Lucia Edwina Wood and had two children, both daughters. He died in Birmingham at the age of 69.

=== Hugh Martin ===
Hugh Martin FAIA (May 11, 1874 – March 5, 1959) was born in Paducah, Kentucky. He was raised in Paris, Texas and was educated at Bingham's preparatory school in Mebane, North Carolina and at Cornell University. He graduated from Cornell in 1894 with a BS in architecture. In 1889, while at Bingham's, he joined the Alpha Tau Omega fraternity, and would be active with the fraternity for the rest of his life. After graduation he worked for Robertson in New York City before moving to Birmingham in 1899.

Martin married twice. His first marriage was to a Miss Trueheart of Galveston, Texas, in 1899. She died in 1902. He married second to Ellie Gordon Robinson of Birmingham, with whom he had three children, including the composer Hugh Martin. He died in Birmingham at the age of 84.

=== James A. Lewis ===
James Artemus Lewis AIA (November 29, 1890 – August 5, 1958) was born in Columbus, Georgia. He was educated in the Columbus public schools and joined Miller & Martin in 1914.

Lewis was married in 1915 to Stella Brammer and had two children. He died in Birmingham at the age of 67.

=== Edwin T. McCowan ===
Edwin Tyson McCowan AIA (February 1, 1916 – November 30, 1984) was born in Mobile, Alabama. He was educated at Auburn University, graduating in 1940 with a BArch. He joined Miller, Martin & Lewis after serving in the army during World War II.

After leaving McGowan & Knight, McGowan joined the Birmingham office of TRO, a Boston-based architectural firm, where he remained for the rest of his life. He was married to Ann Clements and had two children, both sons. He died in Mountain Brook at the age of 68.

=== William P. Knight ===
William Paul Knight AIA (January 18, 1933 – September 4, 1997) was born in Cullman, Alabama. He was educated at Auburn University. He graduated in 1956 and joined the firm.

Knight was married to Carolyn Miller and had two children. He died in Birmingham at the age of 64.

== Legacy ==
Several works of Miller & Martin and Miller, Martin & Lewis have been listed on the United States National Register of Historic Places, and many more contribute to listed historic districts.

Notable employees of the firm who went on to establish their own practices include Helen Sellers Davis, William Frank McCall Jr., E. Chester Nelson and Hugh Stubbins.

== Architectural works ==
=== Miller & Martin, 1900–1935 ===
- 1903 – Birmingham Athletic Club, (Note: Demolished.) 20th St and 5th Ave N, Birmingham, Alabama
- 1903 – Highland Park Golf Course clubhouse, 3300 Highland Ave, Birmingham, Alabama
- 1905 – Goodall–Brown Building, (Note: A contributing resource to the Morris Avenue–First Avenue North Historic District, NRHP-listed in 1986.) 2200 1st Ave N, Birmingham, Alabama
- 1909 – Phoenix Club (former), 2001 15th Ave S, Birmingham, Alabama
- 1911 – First United Methodist Church, 66 Middle St, Montevallo, Alabama
- 1911 – Yielding's, (Note: A contributing resource to the Downtown Birmingham Historic District, NRHP-listed in 1982.) 2129 22nd St N, Birmingham, Alabama
- 1913 – Prattville First Methodist Church, 100 E 4th St, Prattville, Alabama
- 1921 – Gorgas Hall, University of Alabama, Tuscaloosa, Alabama
- 1922 – Birmingham Trust and Savings Company Building, (Note: A contributing resource to the Downtown Birmingham Retail and Theatre Historic District, NRHP-listed in 1989.) 112 20th St N, Birmingham, Alabama
- 1922 – Honors Hall, University of Alabama, Tuscaloosa, Alabama
- 1922 – Independent Presbyterian Church church school, (Note: Designed by Warren & Knight and Miller & Martin, associated architects. A contributing resource to the Chestnut Hill Historic District, NRHP-listed in 1987.) 3100 Highland Ave, Birmingham, Alabama
- 1923 – Phillips Administration Building, (Note: A contributing resource to the Birmingham–Southern College historic district, NRHP-listed in 1999.) Birmingham–Southern College, Birmingham, Alabama
- 1925 – McLure Education Library, University of Alabama, Tuscaloosa, Alabama
- 1925 – President's house, Birmingham–Southern College, Birmingham, Alabama
- 1927 – Birmingham Public Library Linn-Henley Research Library, 2100 Park Pl, Birmingham, Alabama
- 1927 – Farrah Hall, University of Alabama, Tuscaloosa, Alabama
- 1928 – Bidgood Hall, University of Alabama, Tuscaloosa, Alabama
- 1928 – Memorial Building, (Note: A contributing resource to the Oak Hill Cemetery historic district, NRHP-listed in 1977.) Oak Hill Cemetery, Birmingham, Alabama
- 1928 – Munger Building, (Note: A contributing resource to the Five Points South Historic District, NRHP-listed in 1983.) 1931 11th Ave S, Birmingham, Alabama
- 1928 – Munger Memorial Hall, Birmingham–Southern College, Birmingham, Alabama
- 1929 – Denny Chimes, University of Alabama, Tuscaloosa, Alabama
- 1929 – Doster Hall, University of Alabama, Tuscaloosa, Alabama
- 1930 – Reese Phifer Hall, University of Alabama, Tuscaloosa, Alabama
- 1931 – Avondale United Methodist Church, 500 40th St S, Birmingham, Alabama
- 1931 – Stockham Building, Birmingham–Southern College, Birmingham, Alabama
- 1935 – Joseph Loveman & Loeb Department Store, (Note: Designed by William E. Lehman with associate architects Martin & Miller. NRHP-listed and a contributing resource to the Downtown Birmingham Retail and Theatre Historic District, NRHP-listed in 1989.) 214-224 19th St N, Birmingham, Alabama

=== Miller, Martin & Lewis, from 1935 ===
- 1936 – Hardaway Hall, University of Alabama, Tuscaloosa, Alabama
- 1936 – United States Courthouse and Post Office, (Note: Designed by Edgar Lee Love and Miller, Martin & Lewis, associated architects. NRHP-listed.) 101 E Holmes Ave, Huntsville, Alabama
- 1939 – Foster Auditorium, University of Alabama, Tuscaloosa, Alabama
- 1939 – Amelia Gayle Gorgas Library, University of Alabama, Tuscaloosa, Alabama
- 1940 – Mac Wates Fuel Company building, (Note: A contributing resource to the Southside Historic District, NRHP-listed in 2005.) 2801 5th Ave S, Birmingham, Alabama
- 1946 – Bromberg's, 123 20th St N, Birmingham, Alabama
- 1949 – Gallalee Hall, University of Alabama, Tuscaloosa, Alabama
- 1950 – First United Methodist Church chapel and office building, 518 19th St N, Birmingham, Alabama

Private homes designed by Miller & Martin and Miller, Martin & Lewis contribute to the NRHP-listed Arlington Park historic district, Chestnut Hill Historic District, Hanover Place Historic District, Northport Historic District, Red Mountain Suburbs Historic District and Joseph Riley Smith Historic District.
