= William Frank McCall Jr. =

American architect (1916–1991)

William Frank McCall Jr., FAIA (April 14, 1916 – March 12, 1991) was a noted architect who—like his colleagues, Edward Vason Jones, James Means, Philip Shutze, et al.—practiced in the classical tradition. Born April 14, 1916, in Gainesville, Florida, McCall later lived briefly in Albany, Georgia, and moved to Moultrie, Georgia, in 1922. After receiving his Bachelor of Arts degree from Alabama Polytechnic Institute (later Auburn University), McCall practiced with Miller, Martin & Lewis architects, Birmingham, AL, 1938-1941. After a tour of duty with the U.S. Army Corps of Engineers in the South Pacific during World War II, McCall joined the firm of W. Elliott Dunwody Jr. in Macon, Georgia. After 1957, McCall opened his own practice in Moultrie where he remained until his death on March 12, 1991.

== Career ==
As a prolific architect, McCall was known for his unerring sense of proportion, scale, and detailing. He enjoyed a large following from the Sea Island colony—a prestigious resort on the Georgia coast—much as Addison Mizner's following in Palm Beach, FL. He handled non-residential work with equal style and sensitivity and tutored an impressive number of talented draftsmen/architects who later gained fame after their tenure with McCall's Moultrie practice.

In 1984, McCall was named a fellow of the American Institute of Architects (AIA). He often cited classical architects David Adler and Philip Shutze as his source of inspiration and in May, 1986, he was awarded the Arthur Ross Award by Classical America. The award, presented by Kitty Carlisle Hart, was the same award given to Philip Shutze four years earlier.
