= Kilby House =

- U.S. National Register of Historic Places
- U.S. Historic district – Contributing property
- Alabama Register of Landmarks and Heritage
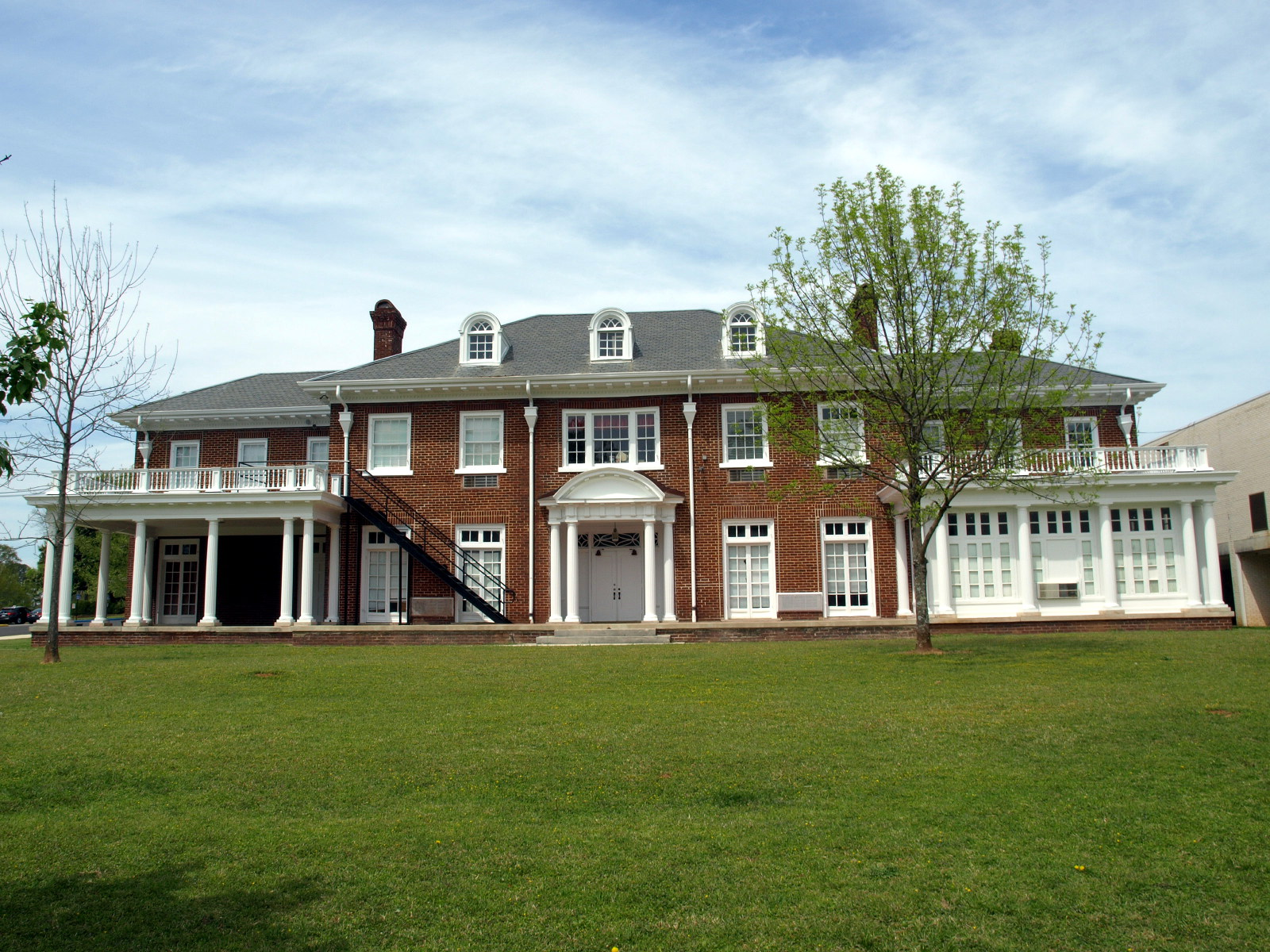
- House in 2014

- Location within Alabama
- Location: 1301 Woodstock Ave., Anniston, Alabama
- Coordinates: 33°39′36″N 85°49′13″W
- Area: less than one acre
- Built: 1914
- Built by: Mr. Ratcliff
- Architect: William T. Warren
- Architectural style: Georgian Revival
- Part of: East Anniston Residential Historic District (ID93000418)
- MPS: Anniston MRA
- NRHP reference No.: 85002872

Significant dates
- Added to NRHP: October 3, 1985
- Designated CP: May 28, 1993
- Designated ARLH: October 3, 1985

Kilby House, at 1301 Woodstock Ave. in Anniston, Alabama, United States, was built in 1914. It was listed on the National Register of Historic Places in 1985.

It is a large two-and-a-half-story Georgian Revival-style house with a hipped roof. It "is distinguished by its symmetrical massing and elaborate moldings. The five-bay central block, flanked by recessed three-bay wings, is centered by a segmentally curved pedimented portico with two fluted Doric columns and a fluted pilaster on each side." It was designed by architect William T. Warren and built by a Mr. Ratcliff, both of Birmingham.

It was deemed significant for its association with Thomas E. Kilby, who served as Lieutenant Governor of Alabama from 1914 to 1918 and as Governor from 1919 through 1923, and architecturally "as retaining perhaps the finest Georgian Revival facade remaining in Anniston."

It is also a contributing building in the East Anniston Residential Historic District.
