= Henderson National Bank =

- U.S. National Register of Historic Places
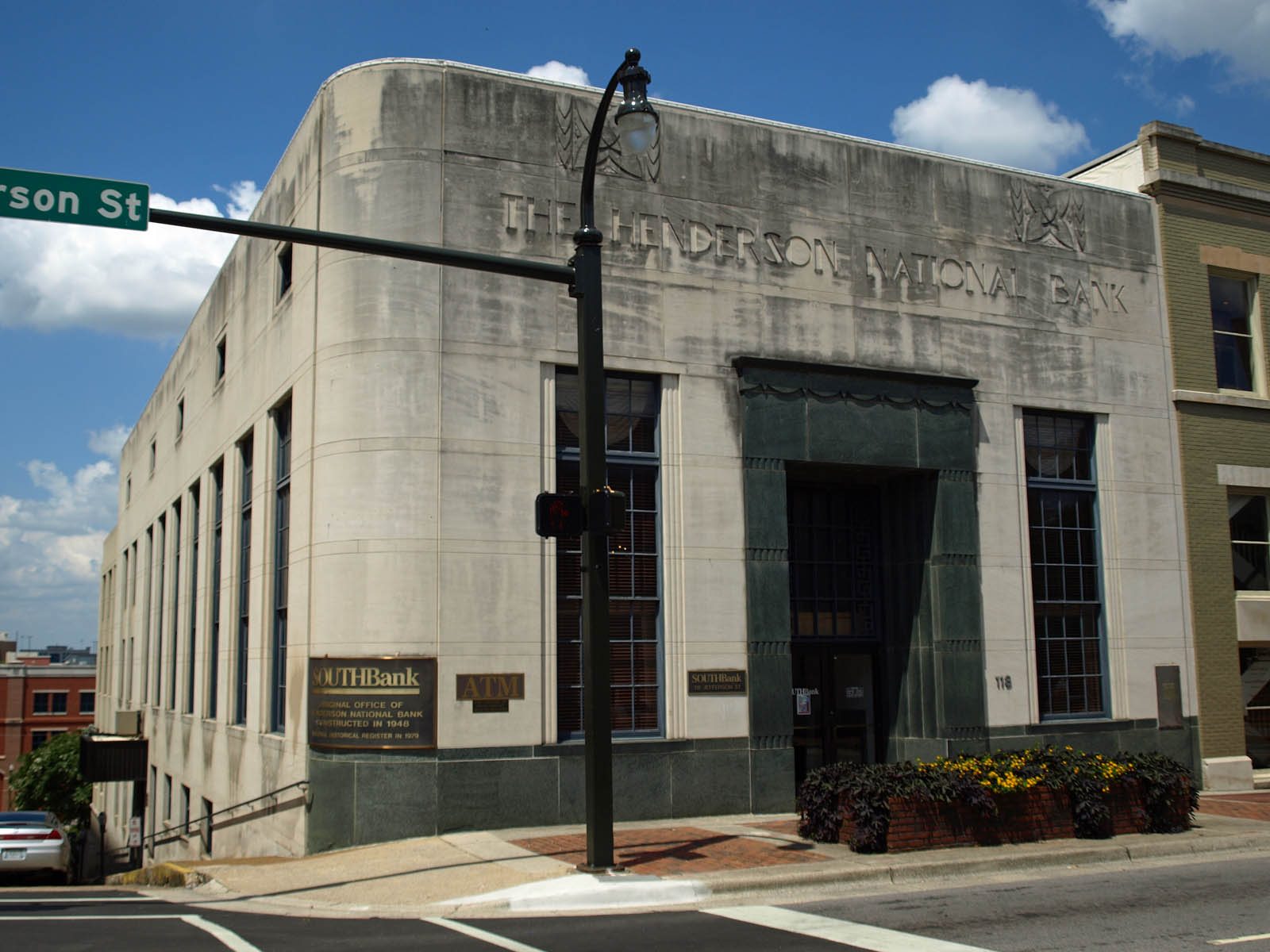
- The building in July 2010

- Location within Huntsville, Alabama Location within Alabama Location within the United States
- Location: 118 S. Jefferson St., Huntsville, Alabama
- Coordinates: 34°43′50″N 86°35′10″W
- Area: less than one acre
- Built: 1948
- Architect: Warren, Knight & Davis
- Architectural style: Art Moderne
- MPS: Downtown Huntsville MRA
- NRHP reference No.: 80000712
- Added to NRHP: September 22, 1980

The Henderson National Bank building is a historic bank building in Huntsville, Alabama. One of the only Art Moderne style buildings in Huntsville, the bank was built in 1948. The outer walls are constructed of large blocks of ashlar, while the base and entrance surround on the Jefferson Street façade are lined with dark green stone. The recessed double doors sit below a tall, multi-pane toplight. The entry is flanked by tall, multi-pane windows, giving the façade a much more vertical orientation than the early 20th-century commercial brick style. The upper portion is inscribed with two geometric flower shapes in relief and the name of the bank. The corner wall is rounded, leading to more tall windows along the side. A drive-up teller window was added to the rear of the building in 1958, which is faced with light tan brick.

The building was listed on the National Register of Historic Places in 1980.
