= United States Courthouse and Post Office (Huntsville, Alabama) =

- U.S. Courthouse and Post Office
- U.S. National Register of Historic Places
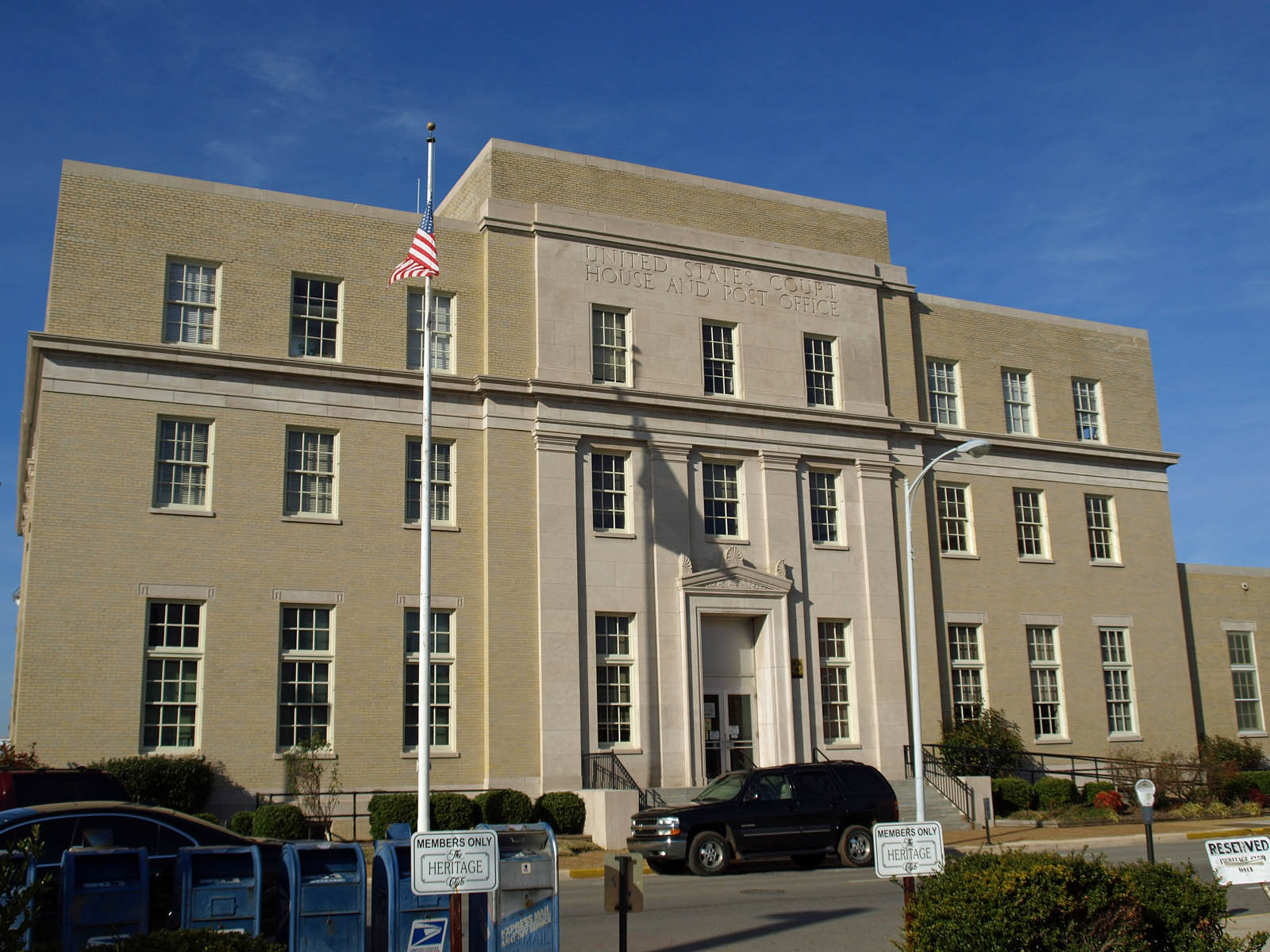
- The building in 2009

- Location within Huntsville, Alabama Location within Alabama Location within the United States
- Location: 101 E. Holmes Ave., Huntsville, Alabama
- Coordinates: 34°43′57″N 86°35′13″W
- Area: 0.5 acres (0.20 ha)
- Built: 1932; 94 years ago
- Architect: Edgar Lee Love; Miller, Martin & Lewis; Office of the Supervising Architect
- Architectural style: Classical Revival
- MPS: Downtown Huntsville MRA
- NRHP reference No.: 81000129
- Added to NRHP: February 24, 1981

The U.S. Courthouse and Post Office in Huntsville, Alabama was built in 1932. It reflects Classical Revival architecture. It was listed on the National Register of Historic Places in 1981.

== Significance ==
The building was one of many built pursuant to the authority of the Public Buildings Act of 1926. It was designed by Edgar Lee Love of Huntsville and Miller, Martin & Lewis of Birmingham. It is generally believed that Louis A. Simon, Supervising Architect of the Treasury, exerted a great deal of control over the design.

The building was constructed as a post office, courthouse and federal office building. When the post office was relocated, many of the spaces, especially on the first floor and in the lobby area, were significantly altered. The building is one of only two in the central business district in the Neo-Classical Revival style. It was listed on the National Register as part of the Downtown Huntsville Multiple Resource Area.

== Architectural description ==
The structure is a three-story Greek Revival–style building. The building has buff brick walls and is ornamented with a limestone water table and an entablature. The main (south) elevation is visually divided into three bays by a central limestone projecting temple form. The temple form consists of four limestone engaged pilasters with simple Tuscan caps supporting an unenriched entablature. The unenriched entablature continues completely around the building at the 3rd-floor level. The main entry door is in the center of the bay. The west elevation is simpler in detail. Visually it is also divided into three bays, with the center bay being defined by brick engaged pilasters carrying simple Tuscan caps.

Both the north and east elevations are buff brick and ornamented with limestone. An unenriched limestone entablature spans the east elevation at the 3rd floor level and wraps around the east and west projecting wings at the north elevation. The north elevation continues to serve as the loading dock area at the 1st floor, though no longer for the postal service. At the 2nd- and 3rd-floor levels the east and west wings project and the recessed area forms a small, light court where the windows of the courtroom are revealed. The original east elevation is somewhat obscured by a buff brick addition at the 1st-floor level. The east elevation repeats the same ornamentation as the west, with the four brick-engaged pilasters with Tuscan caps supporting the unenriched entablature. However, due to the addition, only the tops of the pilasters are visible. It appears that the east elevation was originally identical to the west.

The main, original courtroom is located in the center of the 2nd floor. A wood panel wainscot to 4-foot height encircles the room. The wainscot is ornamented with fluted columns at 2-foot intervals, thus the wainscot mirrors the fluted pilasters of the walls and matches the original courtroom furniture. The north and south walls are accented with fluted plaster engaged pilasters. The plaster crown mold is in the form of a band with blue rectangular fields highlighted with gold. Above each pilaster the blue rectangle is larger and contains a scroll design; between the pilasters the rectangles are smaller and have a sheaf design. Perhaps the most striking feature of the courtroom is the mural behind the rostrum. The mural, painted by artist Xavier Gonzales, is Belgian linen on canvas using zinc white, earth and cadmium colors. The setting is characteristic of the environment of Huntsville and includes five figures symbolizing different phases of society. The figures represent youth, scientific agriculture, work, artistic endeavors and motherhood. The mural was commissioned by the Section of Painting and Sculpture and was installed October 27, 1937.

Of the 18 restrooms originally in the building, eight are still in nearly original condition. The original restrooms are the public restrooms off the 2nd- and 3rd-floor corridors; the private restroom in the 1st floor, southwest, judge's chambers (formerly the postmaster's office); the 2nd-floor judge's chambers private restroom; and the restrooms in the jury and petit jury rooms of the 3rd floor.

There is a large lobby, the former postal lobby, on the first floor and smaller lobbies on 2nd and 3rd floors. Functional public corridors still exist on the 2nd and 3rd floors; the original first floor corridor has been converted into the court tenant space. The tenant spaces are located on the 1st, 2nd, and 3rd floors. On the 1st floor are the newly finished courtroom and another contemporary courtroom, the visiting judge's suite and the Clerk of Courts offices. The main courtroom is on the 2nd floor and the tenant space here is given over to a judge's suite and library on the west side, and the U.S. Marshall's office and detention cell on the east. The 3rd-floor tenant space at the outside of a single loaded U-shaped corridor contains jury rooms, and other related court offices. Typically, all the tenant spaces have been altered to some degree. The basement still serves primarily as the service, mechanical and storage area of the building, and there are also a few small offices here.

== See also ==
- List of United States post offices
