= Arlington Park (Birmingham, Alabama) =

- U.S. National Register of Historic Places
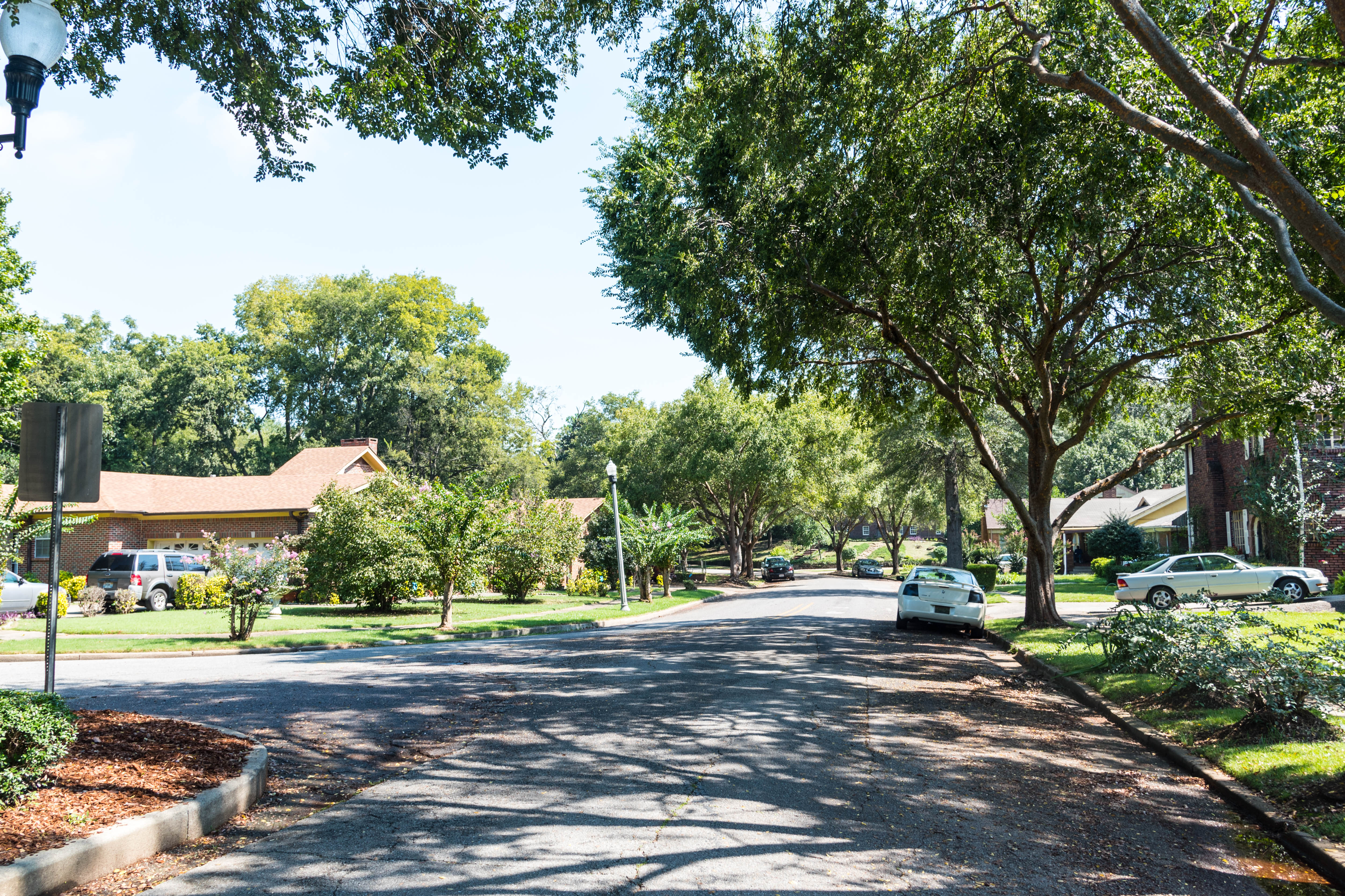

- Location within Alabama
- Location: 800-840 First St. W., 815-909 Second St. W. and 100-269 Munger Ave., Birmingham, Alabama
- Coordinates: 33°29′58″N 86°50′12″W
- Area: 50 acres (20 ha)
- Built: 1920-29
- Built by: Lehigh Portland Cement Co.; Miller, Martin & Lewis
- Architectural style: Tudor Revival, Mission/spanish Revival, Bungalow/craftsman
- NRHP reference No.: 95000097
- Added to NRHP: February 17, 1995

Arlington Park in Birmingham, Alabama, United States, also known as Arlington-West End Historic District, is a historic district which was listed on the National Register of Historic Places in 1926. The listing included 68 contributing buildings on about 50 acres (20 ha). The contributing buildings were all built during 1920 to 1929.

The district is L-shaped and includes 800–840 First Street West, 815–909 Second Street West and 100–269 Munger Avenue. It is adjacent to Birmingham's only antebellum farmhouse, the Mudd-Munger House, also known as "Arlington", and is on lands formerly part of that farm/estate. It is bounded "on the southeast by the tracks of the Southern (now Norfolk-Southern) Railroad, on the west by Fourth Street (earlier Montevallo Road), on the north by Cotton Avenue, and on the east by the alley between First and Center Streets West. Interior boundaries are formed by McMillon Avenue and Second Street that border the Arlington House's grounds."

It includes a work by architects Miller, Martin & Lewis, the Munger-Barr House, at 815 Second Street, built in 1920. It is a two-and-a-half storey English or Tudor-influenced house, built for Robley Charles Munger.

It includes a stucco-over-concrete block house built as a demonstration house by the Lehigh Portland Cement Company.
