= Alabama State University Historic District =

- U.S. National Register of Historic Places
- U.S. Historic district
- Alabama Register of Landmarks and Heritage
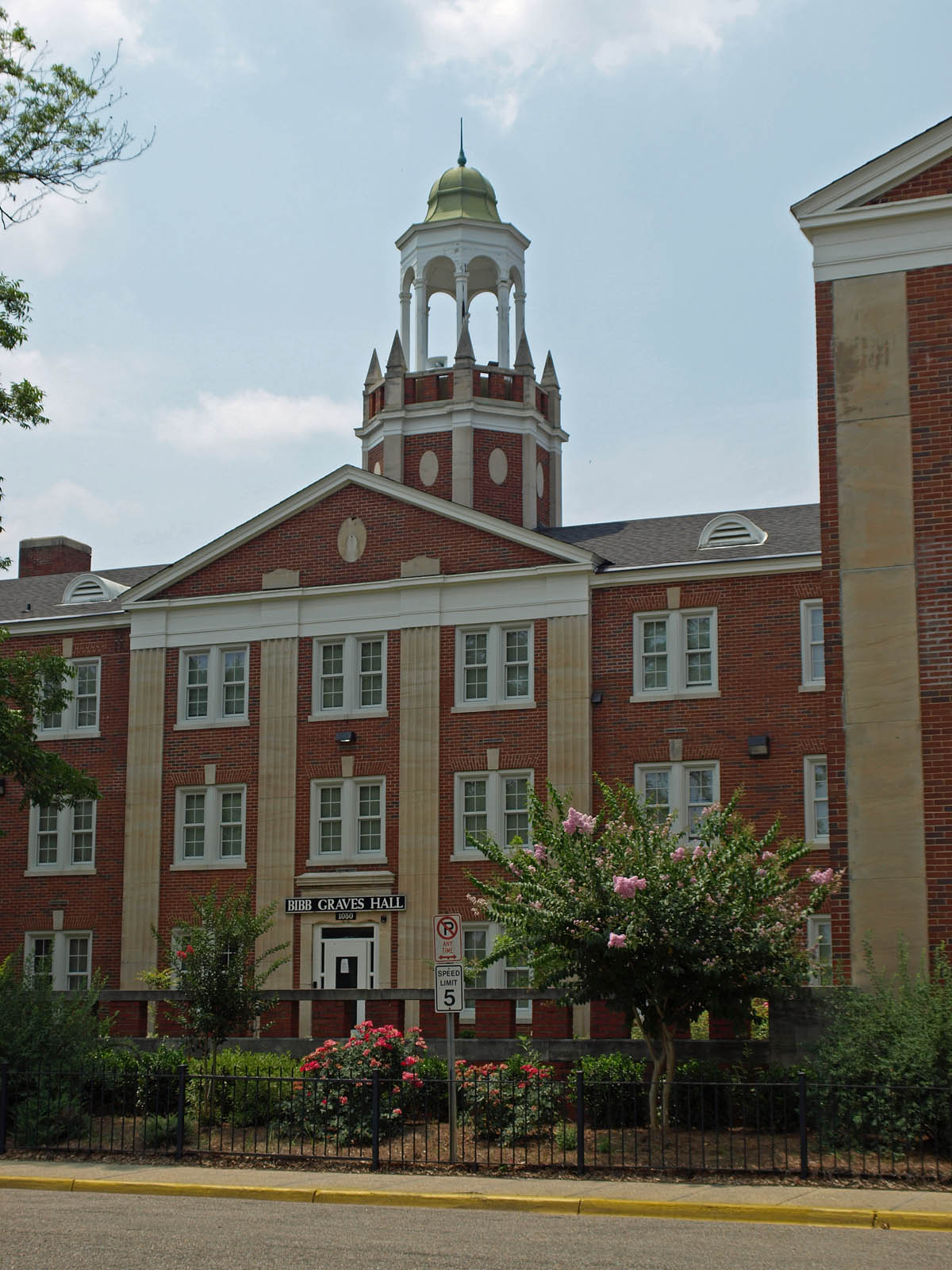
- Bibb Graves Hall, built in 1928

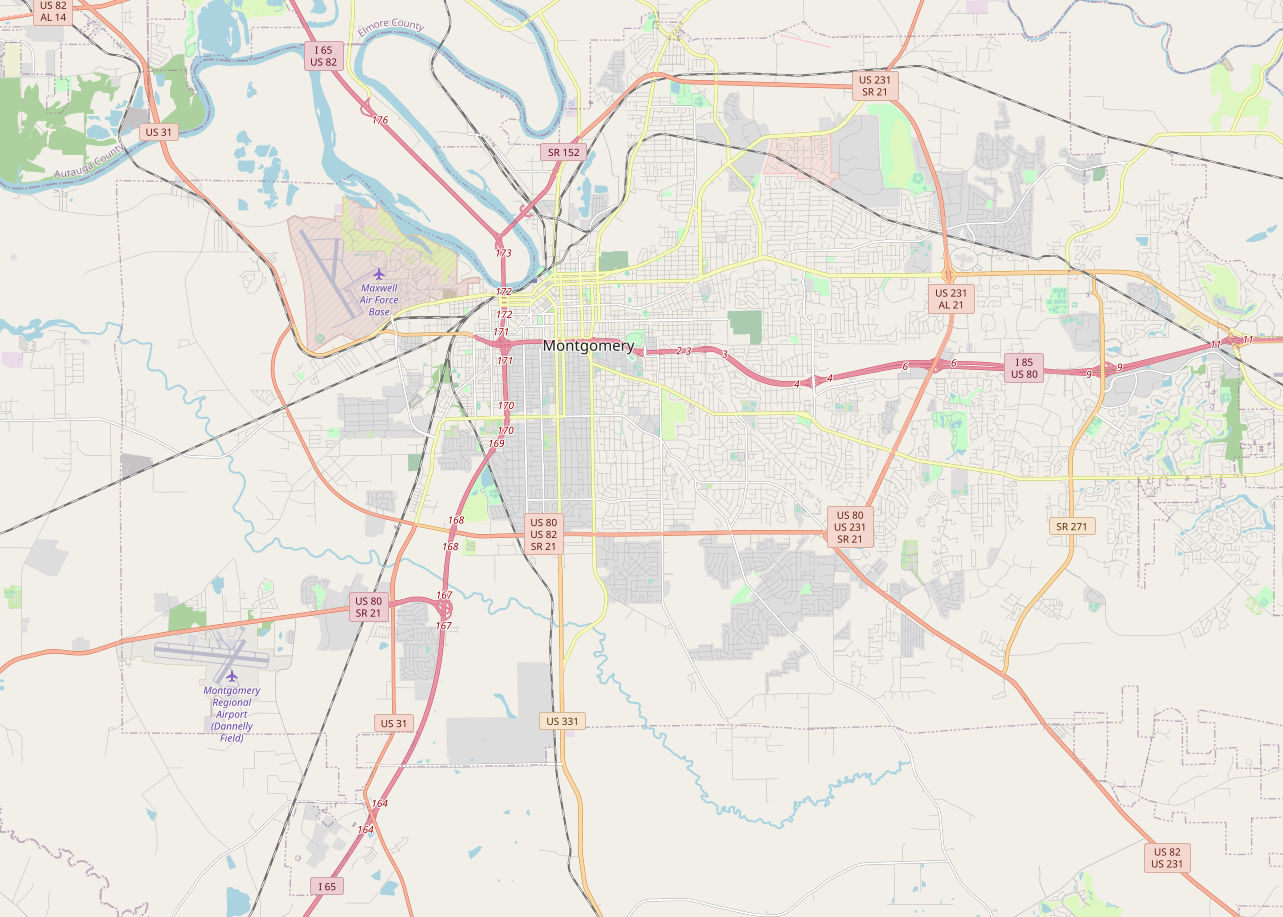
- Location within Montgomery, Alabama Location within Alabama Location within the United States
- Location: 915 S. Jackson Street; Montgomery, Alabama
- Coordinates: 32°21′51″N 86°17′51″W
- Area: 26 acres (11 ha)
- Architect: Warren, Knight & Davis
- Architectural style: Colonial Revival
- NRHP reference No.: 98001228

Significant dates
- Added to NRHP: October 8, 1998
- Designated ARLH: August 25, 1994

The Alabama State University Historic District is a 26-acre (11 ha) historic district at the heart of the Alabama State University campus in Montgomery, Alabama. It contains eighteen contributing buildings, many of them in the Colonial Revival style, and one site. The district was placed on the Alabama Register of Landmarks and Heritage on August 25, 1994, and the National Register of Historic Places on October 8, 1998.

== History ==
Alabama State University traces its beginnings to 1867, when former slaves Joey Pinch, Thomas Speed, Nickolas Dale, James Childs, Thomas Lee, John Freeman, Nathan Levert, David Harris, and Alexander H. Curtis founded a school for African Americans in Marion, Alabama. This school, the Lincoln Normal School, was the direct predecessor for the State Normal School and University for the Education of Colored Teachers and Students, established in 1873 by the Alabama Legislature. In 1887, the school moved to Montgomery, renamed the Alabama Colored Peoples University. Classes were initially held at Beulah Baptist Church. The name was changed to State Normal School of Colored Students in 1889, following legal wrangling regarding state funding.

Land for a permanent campus at the current location was purchased in 1889, with the first permanent building, the wood-frame Tullibody Hall, erected in 1890. This Tullibody Hall burned in 1904 and was rebuilt in brick in 1906. Following the death of the first president, William Burns Paterson, in 1915, the school became organized as a four-year teacher training high school and junior college. In the 1920s, additional land was purchased, and the state appropriated $50,000 for the construction of dormitories and dining facilities. The school became a full four-year institution in 1928, had a name change to State Teachers College in 1929, and conferred its first bachelor's degree in teacher education in 1931. The majority of buildings within the historic district date from this mid-20th century period, 1916 through 1945. The name of the university changed several more times over the next few decades: to Alabama State College for Negroes in 1948, Alabama State College in 1954, and in 1969, assumed the current title of Alabama State University.

== See also ==
- National Register of Historic Places listings in Montgomery County, Alabama
- Properties on the Alabama Register of Landmarks and Heritage in Montgomery County, Alabama
