= Saint Paul's Methodist Episcopal Church (Anniston, Alabama) =

Historic church in Alabama, United States

- U.S. National Register of Historic Places
- U.S. Historic district – Contributing property
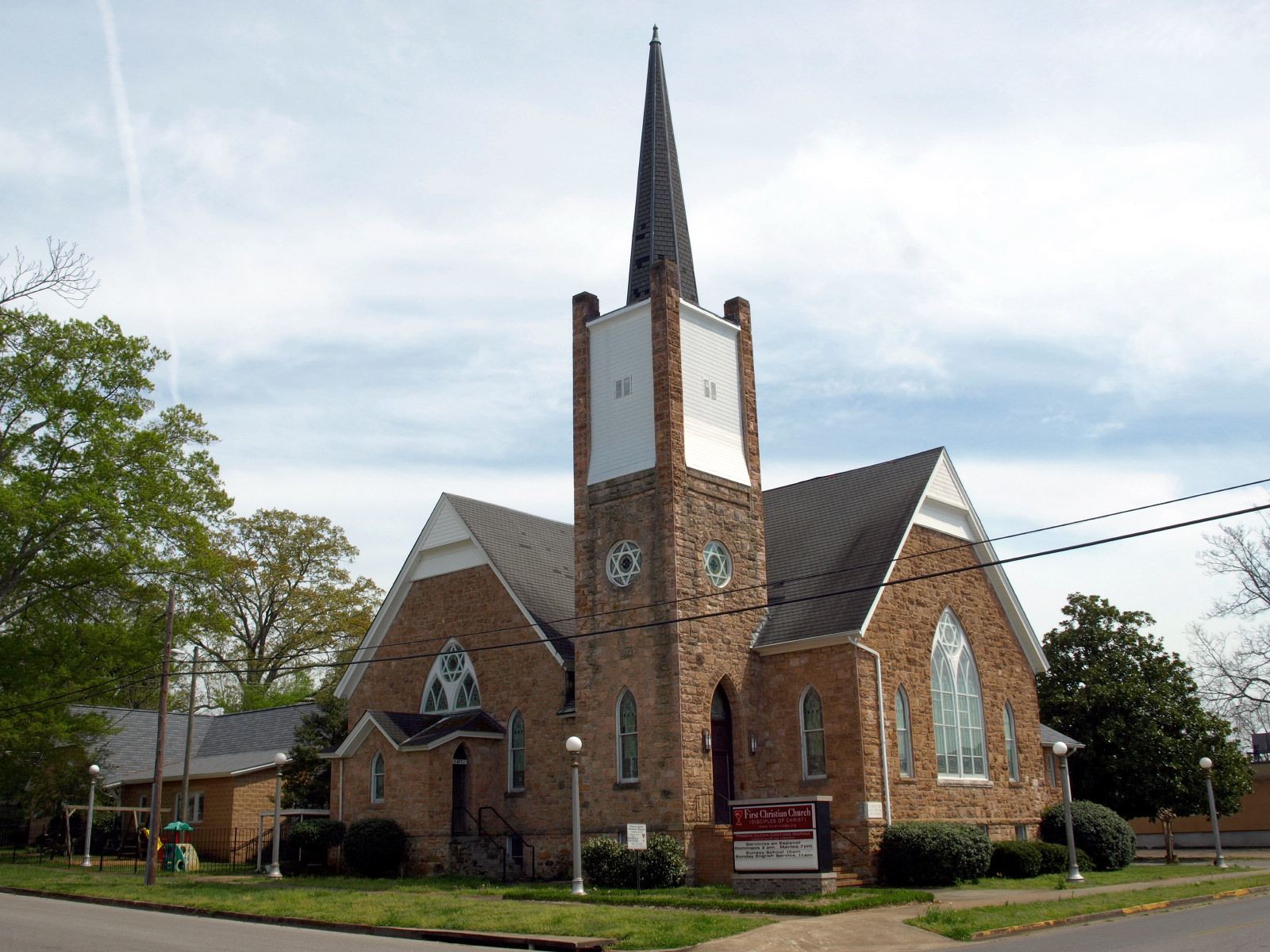
- The church in April 2014

- Location within Alabama Location within the United States
- Location: 1327 Leighton Ave., Anniston, Alabama
- Coordinates: 33°39′40″N 85°49′29″W
- Area: less than one acre
- Built: 1888
- Built by: Simon Jewell
- Architectural style: Gothic
- Part of: East Anniston Residential Historic District (ID93000418)
- MPS: Anniston MRA
- NRHP reference No.: 85002884

Significant dates
- Added to NRHP: October 3, 1985
- Designated CP: May 28, 1993

Saint Paul's Methodist Episcopal Church (also known as the First Christian Church) is a historic Methodist church building at 1327 Leighton Avenue in Anniston, Alabama, United States. It was built in 1888 and added to the National Register of Historical Places in 1985.

Its National Register nomination describes it as "a Gothic structure with Victorian influences constructed of native sandstone ashlar, set on a raised basement of slightly different stone, with a gabled roof and subordinate cross gables. The dominant feature is an entry and bell tower on the north side with a Gothic pointed-arch door, circular windows with a Star of David design set in tracery on each face of the tower at the second stage, and at the third stage, horizontal wooden siding which replaced the original pierced triple lancets in the belfry opening about 1940. The slate spire is also a replacement, and the pinnacles that rose from the tower are gone."

It was built under supervision of English master stonemason Simon Jewell, who also worked on two other large sandstone churches in Anniston.

It is also a contributing building in the East Anniston Residential Historic District.
