= East Anniston Residential Historic District =

Historic district in Alabama, United States

- U.S. National Register of Historic Places
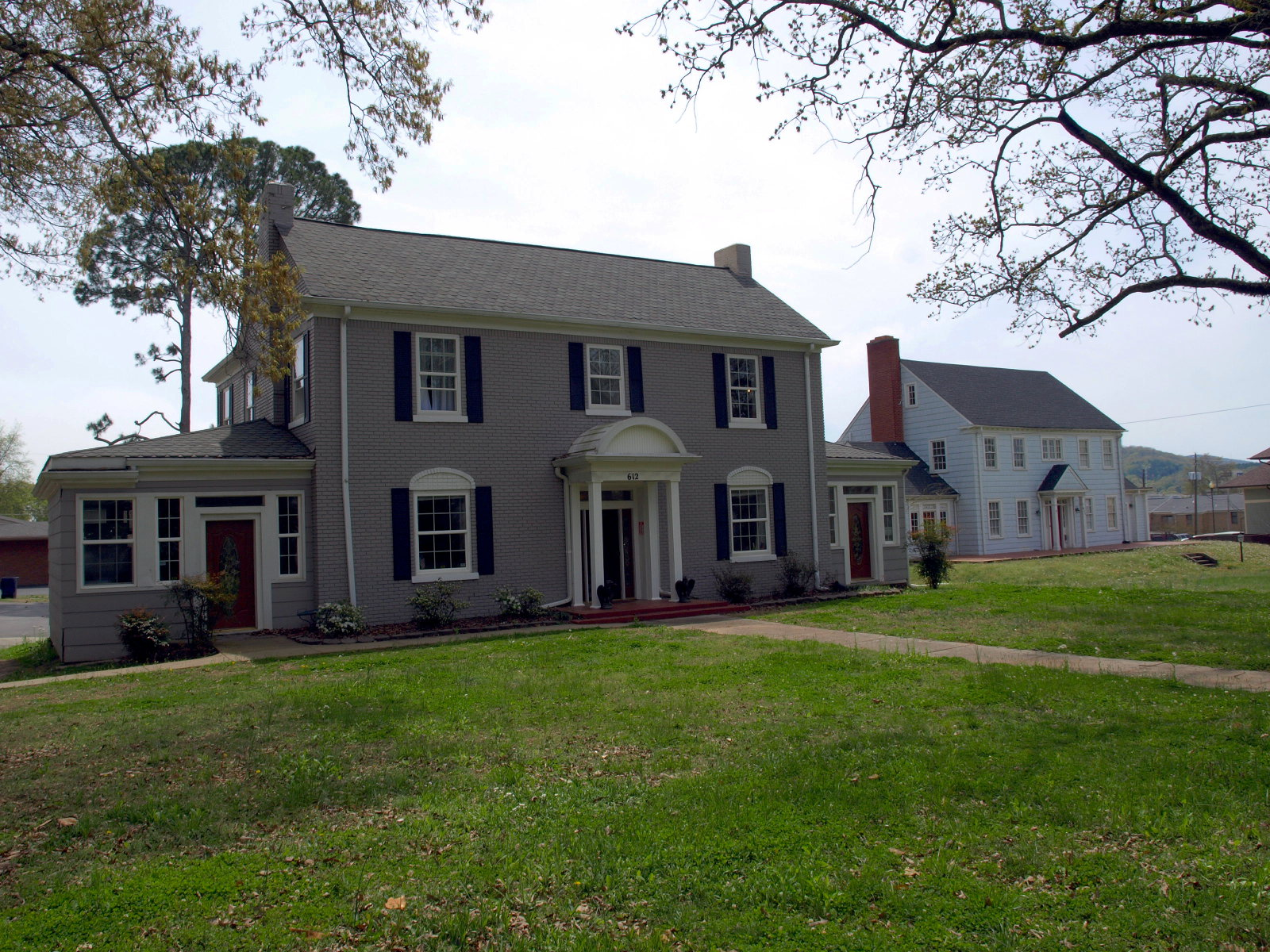

- Location within Alabama
- Location: Roughly, along Leighton and Christine Aves. from 11th St. to 22nd Sts. and Woodstock Ave. from 11th St. to Rocky Hollow, Anniston, Alabama
- Coordinates: 33°39′51″N 85°49′21″W
- Area: 137 acres (55 ha)
- Architectural style: Prairie School, Bungalow/craftsman, Queen Anne
- MPS: Anniston MRA
- NRHP reference No.: 93000418
- Added to NRHP: May 28, 1993

The East Anniston Residential Historic District, in Anniston, Alabama, United States, was listed on the National Register of Historic Places in 1993. The listing included 396 contributing buildings on 137 acres (55 ha).

== Architecture ==
The district runs roughly along Leighton and Christine Avenues from 11th St. to 22nd Sts. and along Woodstock Ave. from 11th St. to Rocky Hollow. It includes Prairie School, Bungalow/craftsman, and Queen Anne architecture.

== Notable contributing properties ==
It includes:

- Crowan Cottage (1886), individually NRHP-listed
- Kilby House (1914), individually NRHP-listed
- Saint Paul's Methodist Episcopal Church (1888), individually NRHP-listed
