= Crowan Cottage =

- U.S. National Register of Historic Places
- U.S. Historic district – Contributing property
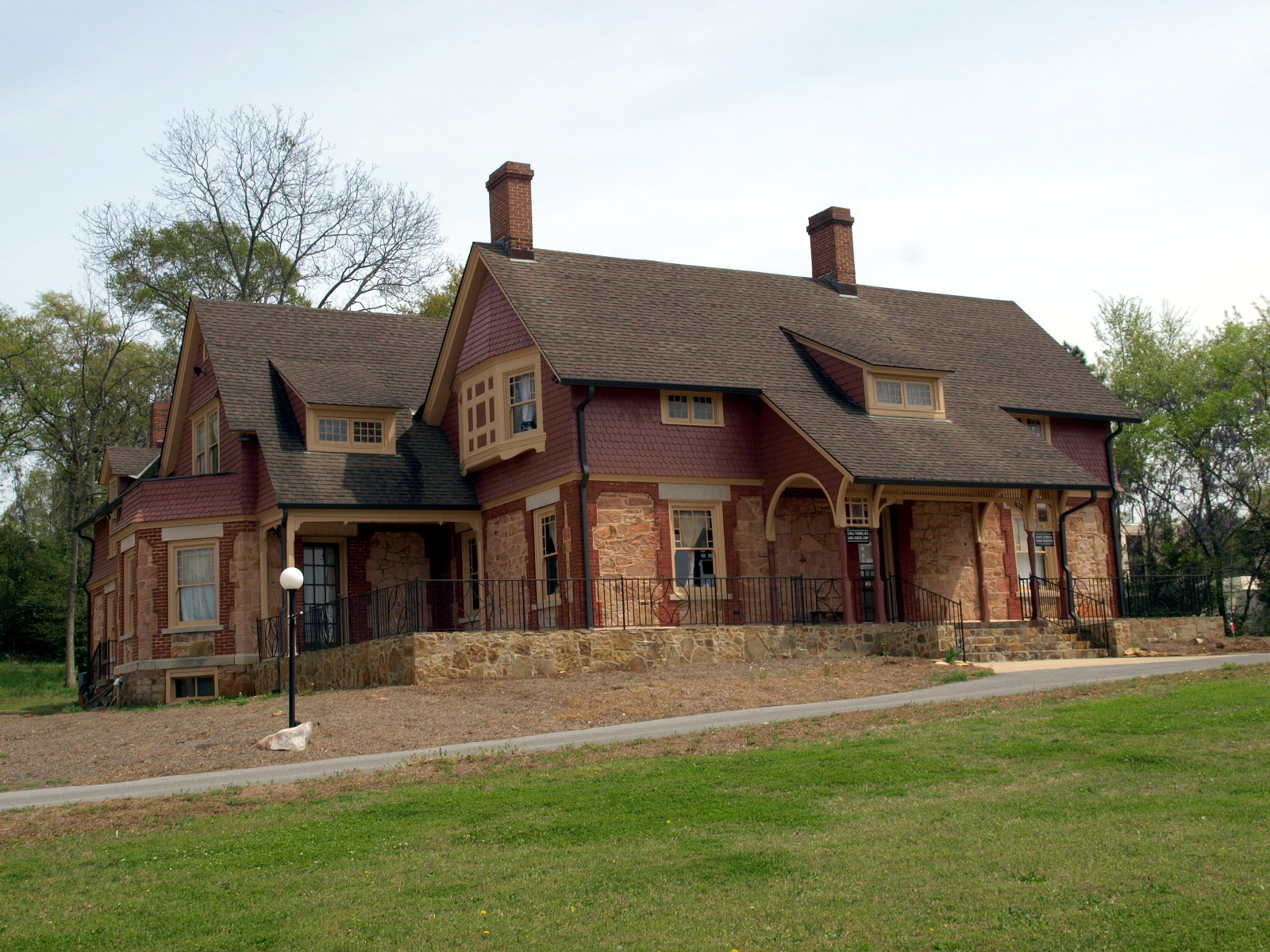

- Location within Alabama
- Location: 1401 Woodstock Ave., Anniston, Alabama
- Coordinates: 33°39′44″N 85°49′12″W
- Area: 1 acre (0.40 ha)
- Built: 1886
- Architect: Stanford White
- Part of: East Anniston Residential Historic District (ID93000418)
- NRHP reference No.: 75000307

Significant dates
- Added to NRHP: May 16, 1975
- Designated CP: May 28, 1993

Crowan Cottage, at 1401 Woodstock Ave. in Anniston, Alabama, United States, is a house believed to have been designed by architect Stanford White and built in 1886. It is Richardsonian Romanesque in style. It was listed on the National Register of Historic Places in 1975.

Its architecture is described as "derived from the innovative work of Henry Hobson Richardson. The stretching of the roof planes to form the porches, and the lifting of roof planes to form dormers are Richardsonian features as is the sculptured treatment of the shingled second story which has been modulated to create flared surfaces and bow windows."

It is also a contributing building in the East Anniston Residential Historic District.
