= Independent Presbyterian Church (Birmingham, Alabama) =

- Independent Presbyterian Church
- 33°30′30″N 86°46′47″W
- Location: Birmingham, Alabama
- Country: United States
- Denomination: Presbyterian Church (USA)
- Website: ipc-usa.org

History
- Founded: October 25, 1915

Architecture
- Architect: Warren, Knight & Davis
- Style: English Perpendicular Gothic
- Completed: 1926

Clergy
- Pastors: Kevin Long, Senior Pastor; Susan Clayton, Associate; David Seamon, Associate

Independent Presbyterian Church is a congregation of the Presbyterian Church (U.S.A.) located on the Southside in Birmingham, Alabama. Initially started by a group of 25 following controversy over doctrinal issues within a local congregation, the church now has approximately 1800 members.

== History ==
Independent Presbyterian Church was formed in 1915 in Birmingham, Alabama, after a popular and charismatic preacher at South Highland Presbyterian Church, Dr. Henry Edmonds, was criticized by members of the Southern Presbyterian Church for having views that varied from the doctrinal standards of that denomination. The controversy was brought to a head when an article appeared in the Birmingham Age-Herald in which Edmonds was quoted as differing from orthodox Presbyterian theology on the subject of the inspiration of the Bible and of the substitutionary Atonement of Christ. Before arguments were fully resolved, Dr. Edmonds withdrew from South Highland Presbyterian Church and with a small group of followers formed the Independent Presbyterian Church of Birmingham, Alabama. The first worship service was held at Temple Emanu-El, Birmingham, Alabama, a congregation of Reform Jews and a close friendship between the two congregations has existed ever since. During the early years, the church also held services in downtown Birmingham at local theaters, primarily the historic Lyric Theater which services were attended by both whites and blacks and which ministered to the working class and the poor.

Though initially independent, the church was admitted into the Presbyterian Church U.S.A. (the "Northern" Presbyterian body) in 1920. The PCUSA denomination actually already had a number of congregations in and around Birmingham, acquired from the Cumberland Presbyterian Church in 1906, so Independent Church became part of a strong presbytery of fellow churches. The church was a proponent of the Social Gospel and was one of the first to establish programs for public health, child welfare and legal aid. Edmonds' pastorate spanned a difficult and turbulent time in the City of Birmingham. He was Chairman of the Alabama Commission on Inter-Racial Cooperation, a group dedicated to improving relations among the races, and took action to ensure a fair trial for the Scottsboro Boys.

Notable pastors of the church have included John N. Lukens (1948–1966), M. Scott McClure (1967–1996), and Conrad Sharps (2005-2014). The congregation elected the Rev. Kevin James Long to be its eighth pastor at a meeting held on May 2, 2021. Long began serving Independent Presbyterian Church on August 1, 2021. The church has approved same sex weddings.

== Architecture ==
Carved wooden doors in the acolyte vesting room

Although Dr. Edmonds had initially opposed the building of an elaborate church building, his attitude and that of the congregation eventually changed and in October 1922, the first phase of a neo-gothic structure on Birmingham's Highland Avenue was built. The facility was designed by the Birmingham firms of Warren, Knight & Davis and Miller & Martin, and is in the English perpendicular style. The sanctuary itself was completed in 1926 and includes stained glass windows designed and manufactured by Nicola D'Ascenzo, noted artist and stained glass maker of Philadelphia, Pennsylvania, and said to be some of his finest work.

== Community Ministries ==
One of the earliest ministries of the church was the establishment of the Children's Fresh Air Farm, which provided camping experiences to children of all backgrounds who would not otherwise have an opportunity to spend time in the country. The Fresh Air Farm was established in 1923 and continues to this day as a revamped summer learning program that furnishes tutoring and learning experiences to children of inner city schools. In 1978, as part of its ministries to older adults, the church formed the Kirkwood-by-the-River retirement community in Irondale, Alabama. The IPC Foundation, a 501(c)(3) entity, provides grants on an annual basis to both local and international groups for humanitarian and educational purposes. Other areas of focus include foreign outreach such as the Mwandi Missionary Hospital and School in Mwandi, Zambia, and the STAIR program furnishing tutoring for second grade students in the Birmingham city schools. The church has extensive educational and youth ministries. The church regularly sends mission groups to Mexico, to Africa and to Ukraine, and its youth groups participate in service work at various locations in the United States and make an annual trip to the Presbyterian Conference Center in Montreat, North Carolina.

== Worship, Music and Fine Arts ==
Worship and music are a central feature of the life of the congregation. The Religious Arts Festival, hosted by the church in February of each year, is in its 43rd year and brings lecturers and musicians to Birmingham. The November Organ Recital Series, now in its 49th year, has brought talented organists to the city for recitals and choral performances. The church commissioned and installed an 87-rank, five-division, three-manual pipe organ manufactured by the Dobson Pipe Organ Builders of Lake City, Iowa, the first Dobson instrument in the State of Alabama, and one of the largest built by that company. The Dobson is named in honor of former organist and choirmaster Joseph W. Schreiber. Worship at IPC includes traditional worship, services for the liturgical year and periodic evensong, as well as contemporary worship in adjacent Highland Hall.

== Church Campus and Ministry Expansion ==
The church purchased the adjacent 1949 building formerly known as the First Church of Christ Scientist, 3116 Highland Avenue, Birmingham, Alabama in 2011. The new space, now referred to as Highland Hall, provides auditorium space for a new contemporary worship service, meeting space for Boy Scout Troop 28, and additional space for ministries to youth and children, including the STAIR Reading Program. Contemporary church musicians are regularly invited to perform at Highland Hall, and the building serves as a venue for youth choirs and musical groups.

== Centennial ==
The church celebrated the 100th year of its existence during calendar year 2015. Special events focusing on the history and mission of the church were held. As part of its celebration, the church published Forward In Faith: A Centennial History of Independent Presbyterian Church.
