= Watts Building (Birmingham, Alabama) =

- U.S. National Register of Historic Places
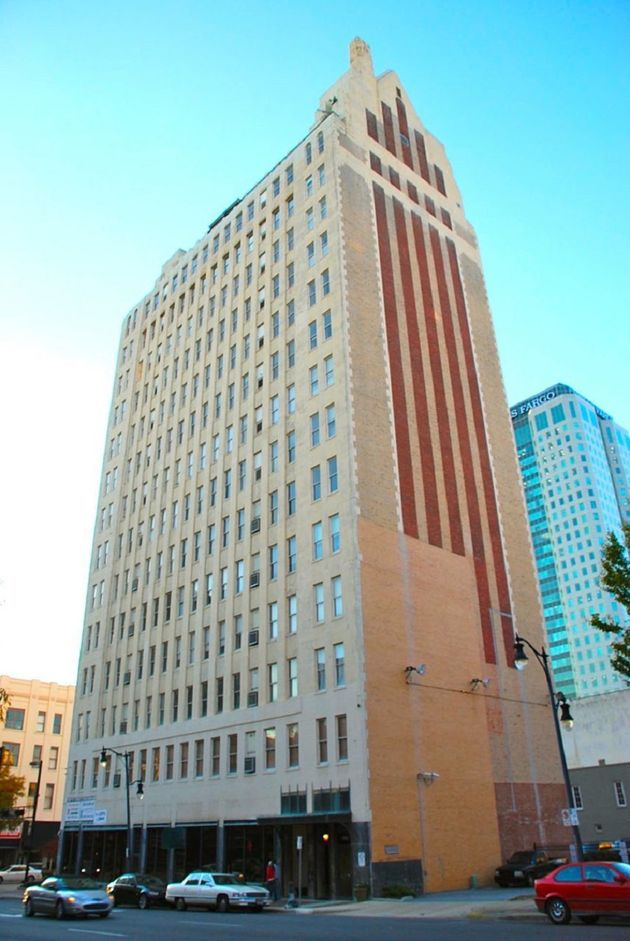

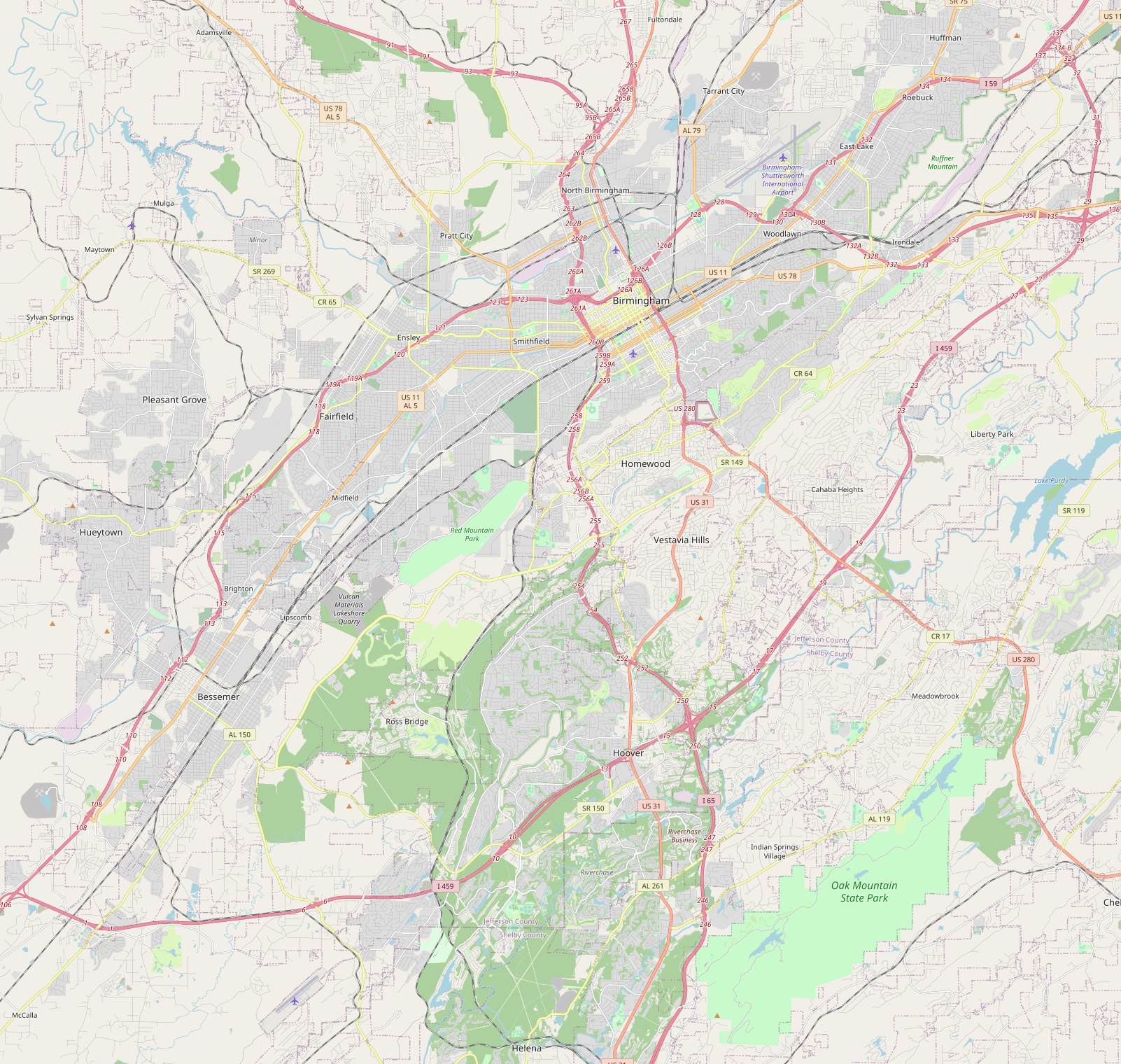
- Location within Birmingham, Alabama Location within Alabama Location within the United States
- Location: 2008 3rd Ave., N, Birmingham, Alabama
- Coordinates: 33°31′0″N 86°48′25″W
- Built: 1927
- Built by: C. M. Allen
- Architect: Warren, Knight & Davis
- Architectural style: Art Deco
- NRHP reference No.: 79000389
- Added to NRHP: September 17, 1979

Watts Building in Birmingham, Alabama, is an Art Deco building built in 1927. It was listed on the National Register of Historic Places (NRHP) in 1979.
