= Northport Historic District =

Historic place in Alabama, U.S.

- U.S. National Register of Historic Places
- U.S. Historic district
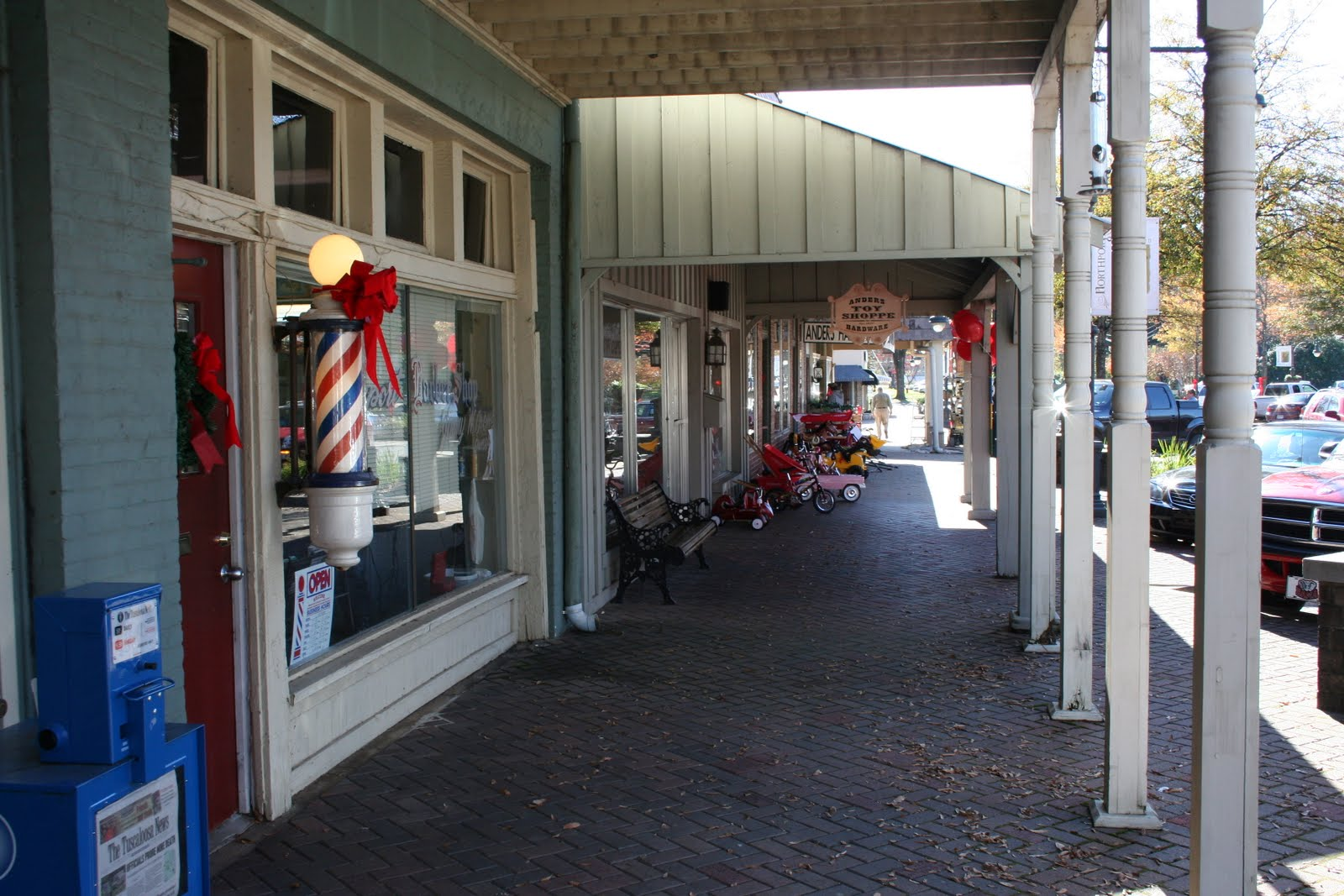

- Location within Alabama Location within the United States
- Location: 25th, 26th, 28th and 30th Aves., Main, 5th, and 6th Sts., Northport, Alabama
- Coordinates: 33°13′9″N 87°34′49″W
- Area: 78 acres (32 ha)
- Built: 1840
- Architectural style: Mixed (more Than 2 Styles From Different Periods)
- NRHP reference No.: 80000736
- Added to NRHP: May 1, 1980

The Northport Historic District comprises the central business district of Northport, Alabama. The district comprises 20 blocks and 134 structures, dating mainly to the late 19th and early 20th centuries, particularly 1920–1925, when the town was rebuilt after a period of decline caused by an 1850 fire and the American Civil War. The earliest structures date to 1840. Most commercial buildings are brick one and two story buildings with flat roofs. Seven wood frame warehouses remain.

The Northport Historic District was placed on the National Register of Historic Places on May 1, 1980.
