= Foster House =

Foster House may refer to:

- Foster House (Union Springs, Alabama)
- Foster House (420 South Spruce Street, Hope, Arkansas)
- Foster House (303 North Hervey Street, Hope, Arkansas)

== See also ==
- Foster Home/Sylvan Plantation, Tuscaloosa, Alabama, listed on the National Register of Historic Places (NRHP) in Tuscaloosa County
- C.E. Foster House, Mena, Arkansas
- Foster-Buell Estate, Cherry Hills Village, Colorado, listed on the NRHP in Arapahoe County
- Ernest LeNeve Foster House, Denver, Colorado, listed on the NRHP in Denver County
- Blacky Foster House, Shoup, Idaho, listed on the NRHP in Idaho County
- Foster Hall (Indianapolis, Indiana), listed on the NRHP in Marion County
- Foster/Bell House, Ottumwa, Iowa, listed on the NRHP in Wapello County
- Herman B. Foster House, Gardner, Kansas, listed on the NRHP in Johnson County
- J.E. Foster House, Jennings, Louisiana, listed on the NRHP in Jefferson Davis Parish
- Foster Family Home, Newry, Maine
- William Foster House, Andover, Massachusetts, listed on the NRHP in Essex County
- Phineas Foster House, Boxford, Massachusetts, listed on the NRHP in Essex County
- Gen. Gideon Foster House, Peabody, Massachusetts, listed on the NRHP in Essex County
- Samuel Foster House, Reading, Massachusetts, listed on the NRHP in Middlesex County
- Alexander Foster House, Somerville, Massachusetts, listed on the NRHP in Middlesex County
- Walter K. Foster House, Stoneham, Massachusetts, listed on the NRHP in Middlesex County
- Stephen Foster House (Topsfield, Massachusetts), listed on the NRHP in Essex County
- Foster-Fair House, Louisville, Mississippi, listed on the NRHP in Winston County
- Reuben Foster House and Perley Cleaves House, Concord, New Hampshire
- Judge Nathaniel Foster House, Lower Township, New Jersey, listed on the NRHP in Cape May County
- Foster–Armstrong House, Montague Township, New Jersey, listed on the NRHP in Sussex County
- Foster Hall (Las Cruces, New Mexico), listed on the NRHP in Doña Ana County
- Dr. Charles A. Foster House, Glens Falls, New York, listed on the NRHP in Warren County
- Foster-Gram House, Put-In-Bay, Ohio, listed on the NRHP in Ottawa County
- Moss-Foster House, Sandusky, Ohio, listed on the NRHP in Erie County
- Claud Foster House, Willowick, Ohio, listed on the NRHP in Lake County
- Philip Foster Farm, Eagle Creek, Oregon, listed on the NRHP in Clackamas County
- Foster-Payne House, Pawtucket, Rhode Island, listed on the NRHP in Providence County
- Foster Ranch House, Chance, South Dakota, listed on the NRHP in Perkins County
- Susie Foster Log House, Smithville, Tennessee, listed on the NRHP in DeKalb County
- Eldred W. Foster House, Fort Worth, Texas, listed on the NRHP in Tarrant County
- Foster House (Navasota, Texas), listed on the NRHP in Grimes County
- Anderson-Foster House, Holly Grove, Virginia
