= National Register of Historic Places listings in Tuscaloosa County, Alabama =

Location of Tuscaloosa County in Alabama

This is a list of the National Register of Historic Places listings in Tuscaloosa County, Alabama.

This is intended to be a complete list of the properties and districts on the National Register of Historic Places in Tuscaloosa County, Alabama, United States. Latitude and longitude coordinates are provided for many National Register properties and districts; these locations may be seen together in an online map.

There are 40 properties and districts listed on the National Register in the county; this includes one National Historic Landmark.

This National Park Service list is complete through NPS recent listings posted February 13, 2026.

== Current listings ==
| | Name on the Register | Image | Date listed | Location | City or town | Description |
|---|---|---|---|---|---|---|
| 1 | The Alabama Book Store | | July 23, 2020 (#100005356) | 1015 University Blvd. 33°12′38″N 87°33′08″W | Tuscaloosa | |
| 2 | Alabama Insane Hospital | Alabama Insane Hospital | April 18, 1977 (#77000216) | University Boulevard; 33°12′58″N 87°32′18″W | Tuscaloosa | |
| 3 | Audubon Place Historic District | Audubon Place Historic District | July 11, 1985 (#85001517) | 1515-1707 (odd) University Boulevard and 8-37 Audubon Pl. 33°12′38″N 87°33′32″W | Tuscaloosa | |
| 4 | Bama Theatre-City Hall Building | Bama Theatre-City Hall Building | August 30, 1984 (#84000746) | 600 Greensboro Ave. 33°12′31″N 87°34′06″W | Tuscaloosa | |
| 5 | Battle-Friedman House | Battle-Friedman House | January 14, 1972 (#72000184) | 1010 Greensboro Ave. 33°12′16″N 87°34′00″W | Tuscaloosa | |
| 6 | Byler Road | Byler Road | November 19, 1974 (#74000438) | 11 mi (18 km) north of Northport, off U.S. Route 43; 33°23′20″N 87°35′48″W | Northport | |
| 7 | Caplewood Drive Historic District | | May 30, 1985 (#85001159) | Roughly bounded by Caplewood Dr., and University Boulevard; 33°12′47″N 87°33′22″W | Tuscaloosa | |
| 8 | Carson Place | Carson Place | March 7, 1985 (#85000448) | 610 36th Ave. 33°12′19″N 87°35′00″W | Tuscaloosa | |
| 9 | City National Bank | City National Bank | March 7, 1985 (#85000449) | 2301 University Boulevard; 33°12′36″N 87°34′02″W | Tuscaloosa | |
| 10 | Collier-Overby House | Collier-Overby House | July 14, 1971 (#71000107) | Southeastern corner of the junction of 9th St. and 21st Ave. 33°12′25″N 87°33′44″W | Tuscaloosa | |
| 11 | Downtown Tuscaloosa Historic District | Downtown Tuscaloosa Historic District | May 15, 1986 (#86001084) | Roughly bounded by 4th St., 22nd Ave., 7th St., and Greensboro Ave. 33°12′35″N 87°34′02″W | Tuscaloosa | |
| 12 | Druid City Historic District | Druid City Historic District | February 24, 1975 (#75000327) | Roughly bounded by Dearing Drive, 3rd St., 16th Ave., 15th St., and 21st Ave. 33°12′29″N 87°33′38″W | Tuscaloosa | |
| 13 | East Northport Historic District | | March 26, 2004 (#04000234) | Roughly bounded by 20th St., 8th Ave., Rice Mine Rd., and Bridge Ave. 33°13′30″N 87°34′20″W | Northport | |
| 14 | First African Baptist Church | First African Baptist Church | September 28, 1988 (#88001580) | 2621 9th St. 33°12′17″N 87°34′14″W | Tuscaloosa | |
| 15 | Fitch House | | July 22, 1987 (#87001027) | 3404 6th St. 33°12′21″N 87°34′50″W | Tuscaloosa | |
| 16 | Foster Auditorium, The University of Alabama | Foster Auditorium, The University of Alabama | April 5, 2005 (#05000457) | 6th Avenue, on the University of Alabama campus 33°12′28″N 87°32′38″W | Tuscaloosa | |
| 17 | Foster Home/Sylvan Plantation | | March 7, 1985 (#85000451) | Off U.S. Route 11; 33°04′49″N 87°42′09″W | Tuscaloosa | |
| 18 | Gorgas-Manly Historic District | Gorgas-Manly Historic District | July 14, 1971 (#71000108) | On the University of Alabama campus 33°12′44″N 87°32′45″W | Tuscaloosa | |
| 19 | Guild-Verner House | Guild-Verner House | December 4, 1973 (#73000374) | 1904 University Ave. 33°12′42″N 87°33′44″W | Tuscaloosa | |
| 20 | Jemison School-Drish House | Jemison School-Drish House | March 17, 2015 (#14000357) | 2300 17th St. 33°11′51″N 87°33′43″W | Tuscaloosa | |
| 21 | Robert Jemison Servants' House | Robert Jemison Servants' House | November 29, 1990 (#90001808) | 2303 13th St. 33°12′08″N 87°33′51″W | Tuscaloosa | |
| 22 | Jemison-Vandegraaff House | Jemison-Vandegraaff House | April 19, 1972 (#72000185) | 1305 Greensboro Ave. 33°12′07″N 87°33′53″W | Tuscaloosa | |
| 23 | Samuel Johnson House | Samuel Johnson House | October 4, 2002 (#02001069) | Shelley Hughes Rd. 33°16′38″N 87°44′30″W | Buhl | |
| 24 | Kennedy-Foster House | Kennedy-Foster House | August 2, 2018 (#100002717) | 1842 25th Ave. 33°11′45″N 87°33′48″W | Tuscaloosa | |
| 25 | Murphy-Collins House | Murphy-Collins House | January 28, 1993 (#92001824) | 2601 Paul Bryant Dr. 33°12′14″N 87°34′09″W | Tuscaloosa | Building currently houses the Murphy African-American Museum. |
| 26 | Northport Historic District | Northport Historic District | May 1, 1980 (#80000736) | 25th, 26th, 28th, and 30th Aves. and Main, 5th, and 6th Sts. 33°13′08″N 87°34′49″W | Northport | |
| 27 | Old Observatory | Old Observatory | January 14, 1972 (#72000187) | North of University Boulevard on the University of Alabama campus 33°12′40″N 87°33′00″W | Tuscaloosa | |
| 28 | Old Tuscaloosa County Jail | Old Tuscaloosa County Jail | November 28, 1979 (#79000404) | 2803 6th St. 33°12′25″N 87°34′25″W | Tuscaloosa | |
| 29 | Pinehurst Historic District | Pinehurst Historic District | June 5, 1986 (#86001229) | 215 and 305 17th Ave., 1-28 Pinehurst Dr., and 6-9 N. Pinehurst Dr. 33°12′48″N 87°33′29″W | Tuscaloosa | |
| 30 | President's Mansion | President's Mansion | January 14, 1972 (#72000186) | On the University of Alabama campus 33°12′32″N 87°32′47″W | Tuscaloosa | |
| 31 | Margaret Quayle Lustron House | Margaret Quayle Lustron House | February 24, 2000 (#00000126) | 27 Parkview Dr. 33°11′59″N 87°32′54″W | Tuscaloosa | |
| 32 | Queen City Pool and Pool House | Queen City Pool and Pool House | September 10, 1992 (#92001088) | Junction of Queen City Ave. and Riverside Dr. 33°12′54″N 87°33′47″W | Tuscaloosa | |
| 33 | Searcy House | Searcy House | April 21, 1975 (#75000328) | 2606 8th St. 33°12′23″N 87°34′13″W | Tuscaloosa | Dr. James T. Searcy House |
| 34 | Searcy House | | September 14, 1984 (#84000748) | 815 Greensboro Ave. 33°12′23″N 87°33′59″W | Tuscaloosa | George A. Searcy House. Building demolished in 2014. |
| 35 | James Shirley House | James Shirley House | March 24, 1972 (#72000183) | 512 Main Ave. 33°13′10″N 87°34′44″W | Northport | |
| 36 | Stillman College | Stillman College | March 16, 2021 (#100004680) | 3601 Stillman Blvd. 33°11′53″N 87°35′07″W | Tuscaloosa | |
| 37 | Tannehill Furnace | Tannehill Furnace | July 24, 1972 (#72000182) | 3 mi (4.8 km) east of U.S. Route 11; 33°14′52″N 87°04′04″W | McCalla | |
| 38 | Tuscaloosa Veterans Administration Hospital Historic District | Tuscaloosa Veterans Administration Hospital Historic District | March 7, 2012 (#12000142) | 3701 Loop Rd., E. 33°11′29″N 87°29′10″W | Tuscaloosa | part of the United States Second Generation Veterans Hospitals Multiple Property Submission |
| 39 | Wheeler House | Wheeler House | April 28, 1980 (#80000737) | 2703 7th St. 33°12′23″N 87°34′18″W | Tuscaloosa | |
| 40 | Wilson-Clements House | Wilson-Clements House | April 11, 1985 (#85000737) | 1802 20th Ave. 33°13′42″N 87°34′41″W | Northport | |

== Former listings ==
| | Name on the Register | Image | Date listed | Date removed | Location | City or town | Description |
|---|---|---|---|---|---|---|---|
| 1 | John Hassell House | | March 7, 1985 (#85000447) | July 22, 2002 | Rt. 1 Watermelon Road | Northport vicinity | |

== See also ==
- List of National Historic Landmarks in Alabama
- National Register of Historic Places listings in Alabama
