= Whitman House =

Whitman House may refer to:

- Edward Fenns Whitman House, Boaz, Alabama, listed on the National Register of Historic Places (NRHP) in Marshall County
- Whitman-Cobb House, New Market, Alabama, NRHP-listed in Madison County
- Merle Whitman Tourist Cabin, Ozark, Arkansas, NRHP-listed in Franklin County
- Stanley-Whitman House, Farmington, Connecticut, NRHP-listed in Hartford County
- Whitman House (West Hartford, Connecticut), NRHP-listed in Hartford County
- Whitman-Anderson House, Ringgold, Georgia, NRHP-listed in Catoosa County
- Josiah B. Whitman House, Barnstable, Massachusetts, NRHP-listed in Barnstable County
- John S. Whitman House, Midland, Michigan, NRHP-listed in Midland County
- George Whitman House, Camden, New Jersey, NRHP-listed in Camden County
- Walt Whitman House, Camden, New Jersey, NRHP-listed in Camden County
- Joseph Whitman House, West Hills, New York, NRHP-listed in Suffolk County
- Walt Whitman House, West Hills, New York, NRHP-listed in Suffolk County
- Whitman-Place House, West Hills, New York, NRHP-listed in Suffolk County
- Winsor-Swan-Whitman Farm, Providence, Rhode Island, NRHP-listed
- Whitman-Belden House, Rochester, Wisconsin, NRHP-listed in Racine County
