= David O. Whilldin =

American architect

David Oliver Whilldin (April 8, 1881 – January 18, 1970) was an American architect in Alabama. Several of the buildings he designed are listed on the National Register of Historic Places, including his office building the Whilldin Building. His designs include Legion Field and schools in the Birmingham City Schools district.

Whilldin was born in Philadelphia. He studied at Drexel Institute and the University of Pennsylvania.

He retired in 1962.

A pen and ink drawing he did of Independence Hall in Philadelphia is in the Birmingham Museum of Art's collection.

== Works ==
- Old Ensley High School building (1908)
- National Bank of Attalla (1913) in Etowah County, Alabama on the corner of North Third Street and 5th Avenue
- Gadsden Country Club (1919)
- Hueytown High School (1921)
- Whilldin Building (1924), Birmingham, Alabama, NRHP-listed
- West End Masonic Temple (1926), Birmingham, Alabama, NRHP-listed
- Legion Field (1927)
- Thomas Jefferson Hotel (1929)
- West End High School (Birmingham, Alabama) (1930) with Warren, Knight and Davis
- Pizitz Department Store (1930) at 311 Broad Street in Gadsden
- Bama Theatre (1937), Tuscaloosa, Alabama, NRHP-listed
- Reich Hotel in Gadsden, Alabama
- Pitman Theatre in Gadsden, Alabama
- Several elementary schools in Gadsden and a junior high school
- Tuscaloosa City Hall
- Dr. Pepper Syrup Plant, Birmingham, Alabama, NRHP-listed
- Ideal Department Store Building, Birmingham, Alabama, NRHP-listed
- Pratt School, Birmingham, Alabama, NRHP-listed
- American National Bank in Gadsden
- One or more works in Birmingham–Southern College, Birmingham, Alabama, NRHP-listed
- One or more works in Anderson Place Historic District, Birmingham, NRHP-listed
- One or more works in Woodlawn Highlands Historic District, Birmingham, Alabama, NRHP-listed
