= Audubon Place =

Audubon Place may refer to:

- Audubon Place, in Audubon Place Historic District, Tuscaloosa, Alabama
- Audubon Place (New Orleans, Louisiana)
