= Alexander Foster =

Alexander Foster may refer to:

- Alexander Foster (rugby union) (1890–1972), Irish rugby union player
- Alexander Foster House

== See also ==
- Alex Foster (disambiguation)
