= Alex Foster =

Alex Foster may refer to:

- Alex Foster (musician) (born 1953), American jazz saxophone player
- Alex Foster (ice hockey) (born 1984), American ice hockey forward
- Alex Foster (rugby league) (born 1993), English professional rugby league footballer
- Alex Foster (athlete) (born 1970), Costa Rican Olympic hurdler
- Alex Henry Foster, Canadian singer-songwriter and musician
- Alex Foster; see List of EastEnders characters (2012)#Others

== See also ==
- Alexander Foster (disambiguation)
- Alex Forster (born 1993), Australian rules footballer
