= Battle–Friedman House =

Historic house in Alabama, United States

- U.S. National Register of Historic Places
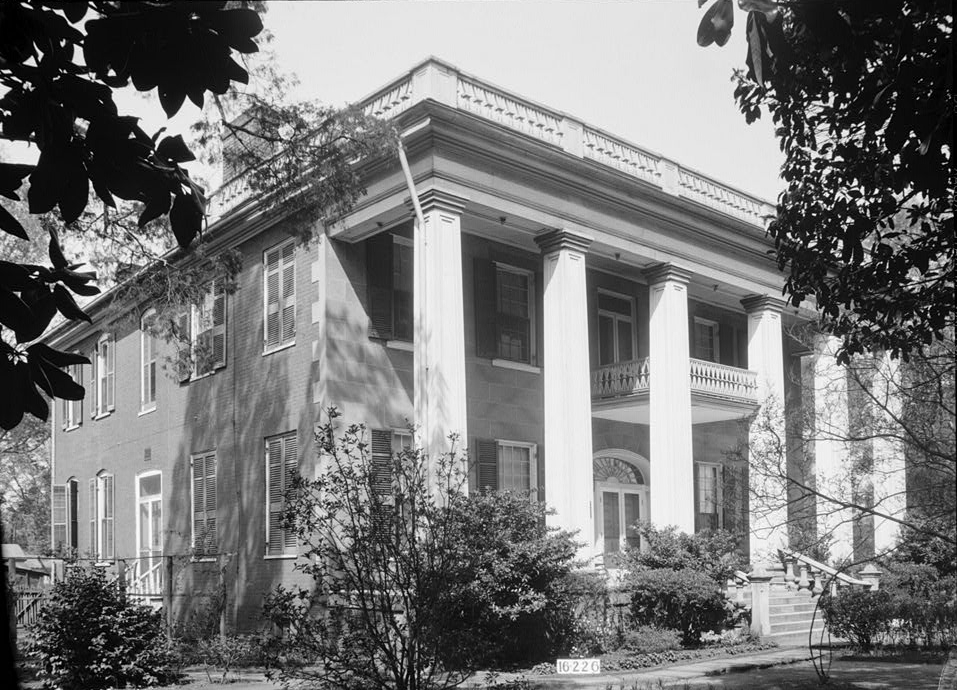
- Battle–Friedman House in 1934

- Location within Alabama Location within the United States
- Location: 1010 Greensboro Ave., Tuscaloosa, Alabama
- Coordinates: 33°12′16″N 87°34′0″W
- Built: 1835
- Architectural style: Federal, Grecian Revival, Neo-Classical interior sections
- NRHP reference No.: 72000184
- Added to NRHP: January 14, 1972

The Battle–Friedman House (also known as Battle House or Friedman Home) is an antebellum town home located in Tuscaloosa, Alabama. The house was built in 1835 by Alfred Battle and his wife, Millicent Battle with the house's ground including the only remaining documented antebellum garden in the state. The house itself is noted for its vernacular use of monumental boxed columns. The Battle family lived in the house until 1875, when the home was purchased by Bernard Friedman. The Friedman family continued to reside in the house until Victor Hugo Friedman died in 1965, leaving the house to the city of Tuscaloosa. The Tuscaloosa County Preservation Society currently maintains the house as a historic house museum. It was added to the National Register of Historic Places in 1972.

== See also ==
- National Register of Historic Places listings in Tuscaloosa County, Alabama
