= Bama Theatre =

Historic movie theater in Tuscaloosa, Alabama

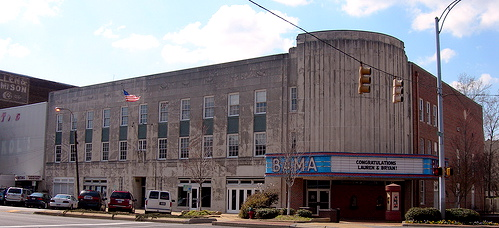
- The theatre in 2010
- Interactive map of Bama Theatre
- Address: 600 Greensboro Ave; Tuscaloosa, Alabama; United States
- Coordinates: 33°12′31″N 87°34′5″W
- Capacity: 986

Construction
- Built: 1937
- Architect: David O. Whilldin of Birmingham

Website
- tuscarts.org
- Bama Theatre-City Hall Building
- U.S. National Register of Historic Places
- Alabama Register of Landmarks and Heritage
- Architectural style: Streamline Moderne
- Part of: Downtown Tuscaloosa Historic District
- NRHP reference No.: 84000746

Significant dates
- Added to NRHP: August 30, 1984
- Designated ARLH: June 30, 1983

The Bama Theatre is a historic theatre in Tuscaloosa, Alabama that currently serves as the city's performing arts center. Its modern redevelopment is the result of cooperation between the Arts Council of Tuscaloosa and the Tuscaloosa County Parks and Recreation Authority. The three-story brick and limestone building is located at the corner of Gary Fitts Street (formerly Sixth Street) and Greensboro Avenue in downtown Tuscaloosa. It was added to the National Register of Historic Places (NRHP) on August 30, 1984. It is also a contributing building in the Downtown Tuscaloosa Historic District, NRHP-listed in 1985.

== History ==
=== A previous Bama Theatre ===
Before the current Bama Theatre was built, there was a theater of that name in Tuscaloosa. This earlier Bama Theatre was built in 1924 on Broad Street (today's University Boulevard)—one block from the later Bama Theatre. The early Bama featured silent films and vaudeville shows and operated during the transition from silent to sound films. It was renamed the Druid Theater when the newer Bama opened. Its new name derived from Tuscaloosa's nickname as the "Druid City".

=== Early history ===
The Bama Theatre was originally constructed from 1937–38 through Franklin D. Roosevelt's New Deal as a Public Works Administration project. The building was built as a combination theater and city hall for Tuscaloosa. It was designed by Birmingham architect David O. Whilldin, who also designed other historically significant buildings in the Tuscaloosa downtown area and worked from the Whilldin Building. The building opened as a theater on April 12, 1938. The theater was one of the last movie palaces built in the South. The building features a Streamline Moderne exterior style, popular during the period, and a lavish "atmospheric" interior style that is decorated with a combination of Moderne and Renaissance elements. Twinkling stars and clouds on the ceiling create an open air feel in the performance hall. The city hall was moved out the building following the city's acquisition and renovation of the former United States Post Office (built 1909) in 1968.

=== Renovations ===
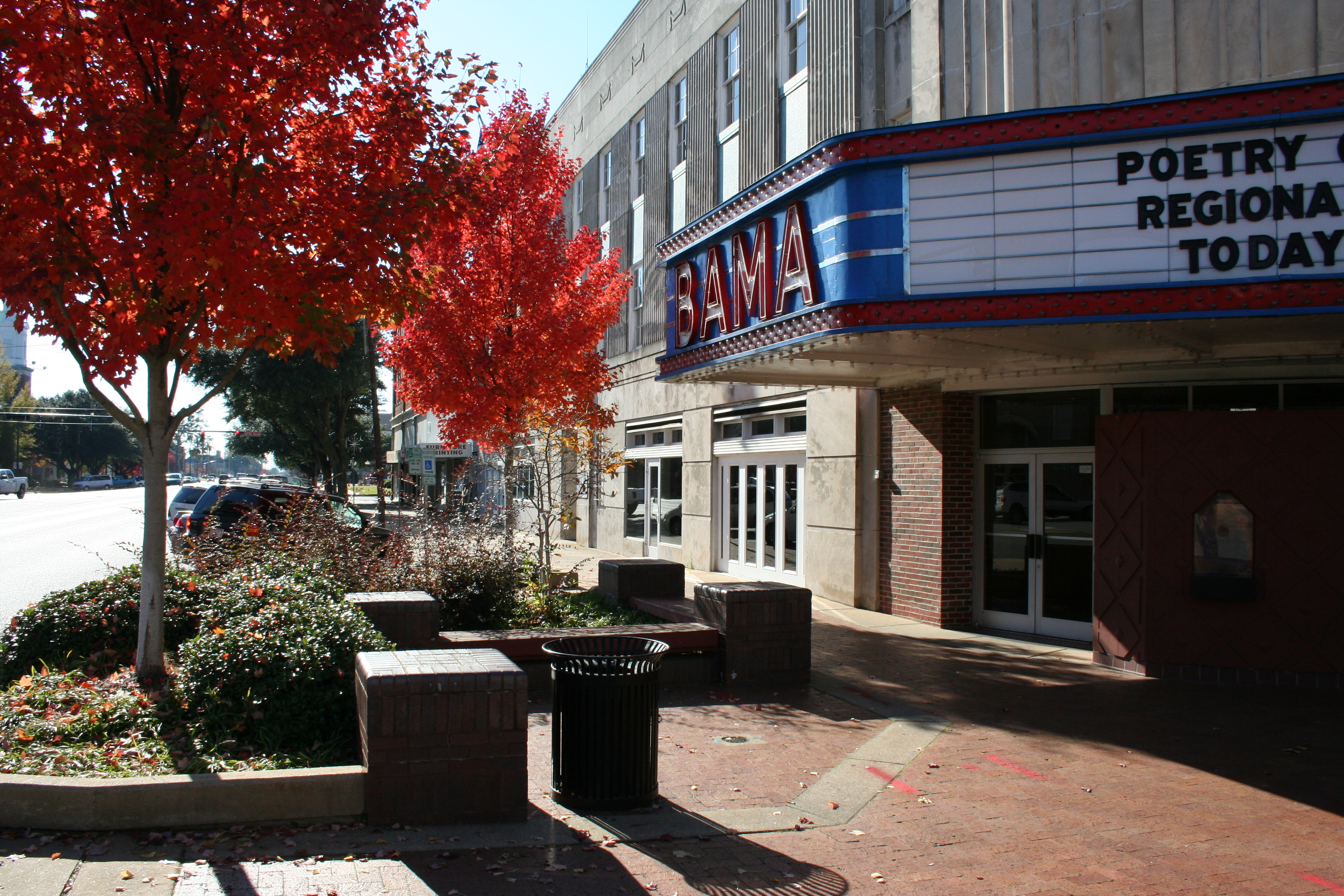
Entrance of the Bama Theatre in 2009

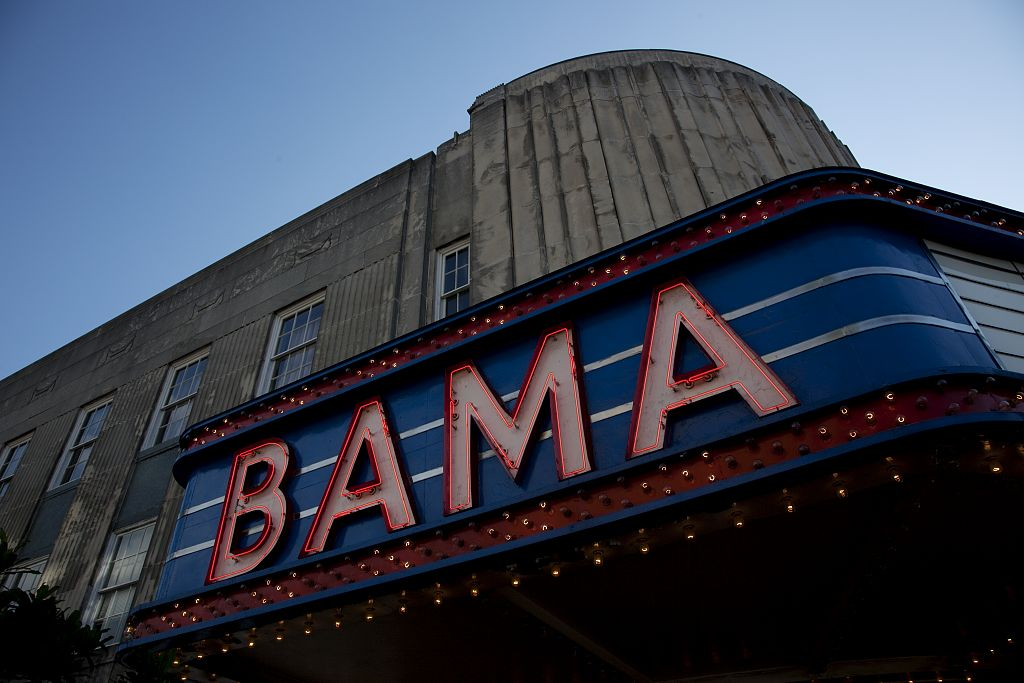
Detail of the marquee in 2010

The theatre was converted to a performing arts center in 1976 and has been completely renovated for live theatrical/concert use. With the arrival of theater manager David Allgood in 2003, the Bama became a sought-after venue for touring artists; but that has waned after he retired circa 2019. The movie fare at The Bama was also revamped, creating the Bama Art House Film Series, featuring independent, foreign, and documentary movies. Past screenings have included Boyhood, Moonrise Kingdom, Turn Me On, Dammit, Room, and the world premier of John Sayles's Honeydripper, which was filmed in Alabama. Sayles attended the one-night screening, which drew an audience of nearly 900 people. In the 2020s, the Bama hosts a mixture of entertainment—concerts, movies, dance performances, and live theater.

The central panel of the theatre marquee was replaced with an LED screen in March 2017. A major renovation in 2022 replaced all the seats and carpeting and upgraded the facility.

== Performance groups ==
The Bama Theatre is home to several performance groups from Tuscaloosa and the surrounding area. The Tuscaloosa Children's Theatre and Tuscaloosa Community Dancers perform at the theater 2-3 times a year each. The theatre is also home to several dance school end-of-year recitals including The Dance Centre and The Academy of Ballet and Jazz. The Tuscaloosa Academy Players, Tuscaloosa County High School Drama Dept and Brookwood Drama Department have also staged productions here.
