= Anderson Place Historic District =

Historic district in Alabama, United States

- U.S. National Register of Historic Places
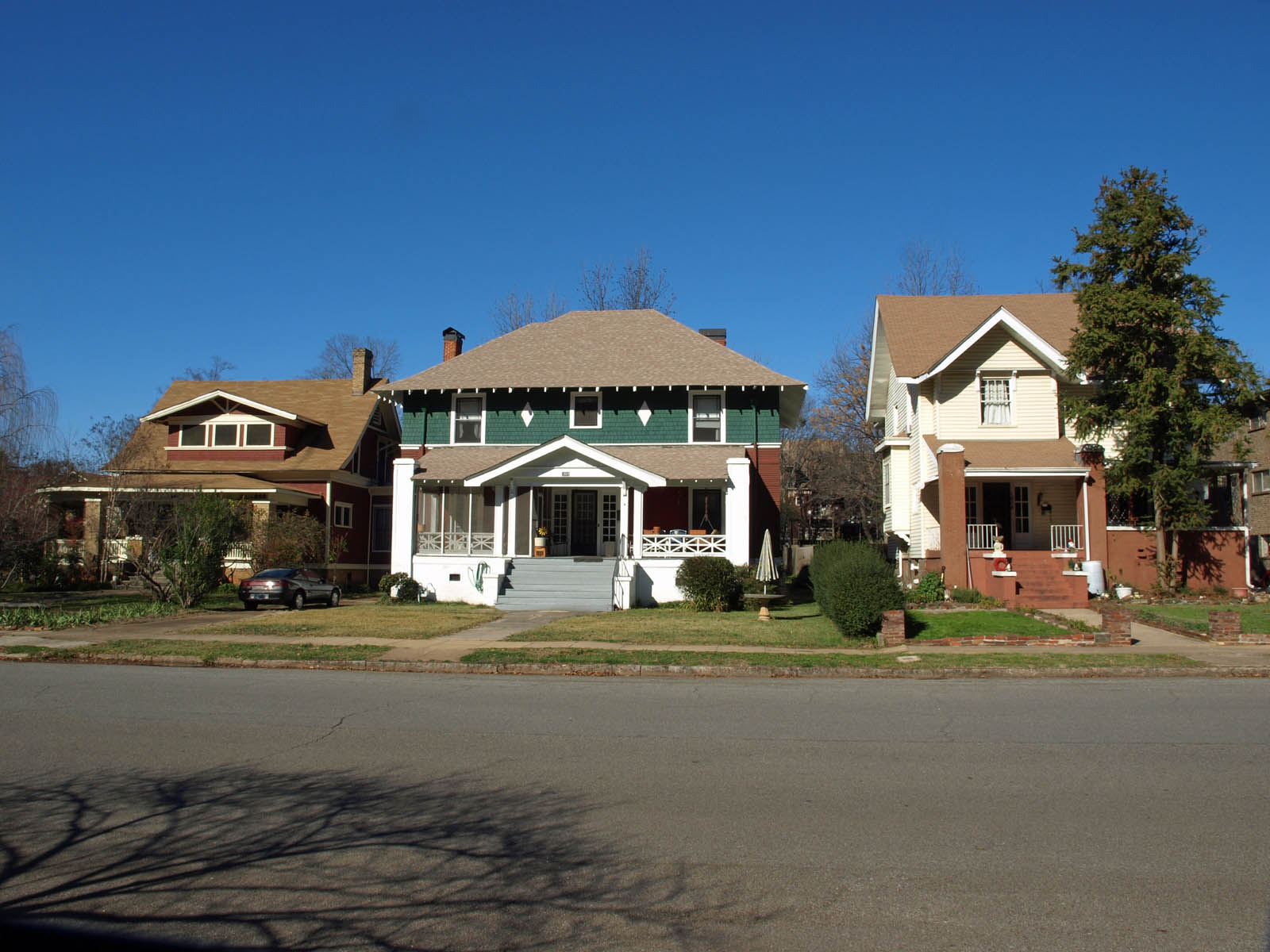

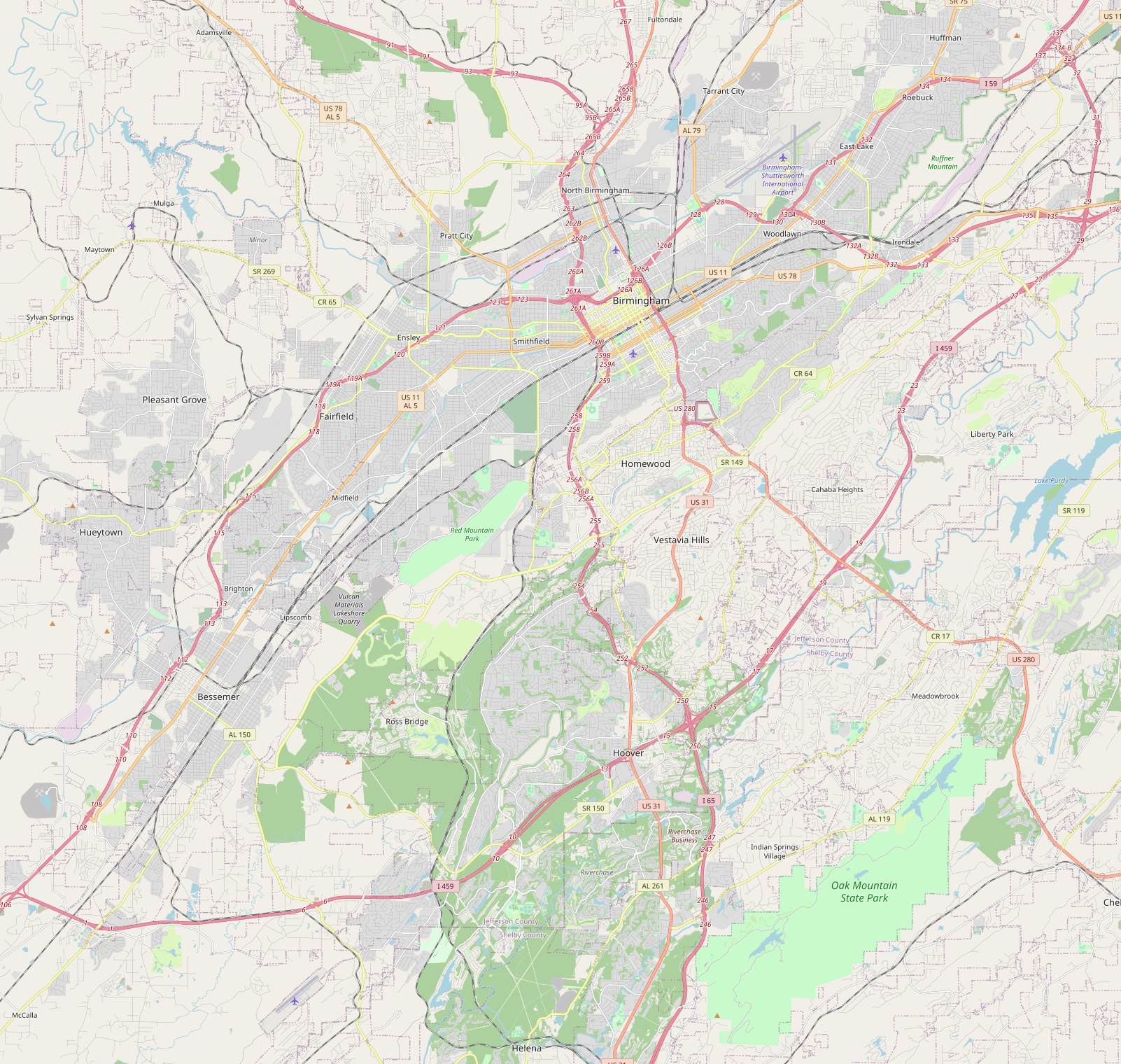
- Location within Birmingham, Alabama Location within Alabama Location within the United States
- Location: Roughly bounded by 14th Ave., S., 18th St., S., 16th Ave., S., and 15th St., S.; also roughly 16th Ave., S. from 15th St. to a line south from 18th St., Birmingham, Alabama
- Coordinates: 33°29′37″N 86°48′00″W
- Area: 23 acres (9.3 ha) (original); 14 acres (5.7 ha) (increase)
- Architect: D.O. Whilldin, S. Scott, D.O.; Et al.
- Architectural style: Bungalow/Craftsman, Tudor Revival, Queen Anne (original); Colonial Revival (increase)
- NRHP reference No.: 86001981 (original); 91000592 (increase)

Significant dates
- Added to NRHP: August 28, 1986
- Boundary increase: May 15, 1991

The Anderson Place Historic District, in Birmingham, Alabama, United States, is a residential historic district which was listed on the National Register of Historic Places in 1986, and the listing was expanded in 1991. The houses date from 1907 to 1912 and include Tudor Revival, Queen Anne, and Bungalow/Craftsman architecture.

The district originally included 89 contributing buildings on 23 acres (9.3 ha).

The original area is roughly bounded by Fourteenth Avenue South, Eighteenth Street South, Sixteenth Avenue South, and Fifteenth Street South. It includes work by architect D. O. Whilldin and others.

The increase added 35 contributing buildings on 14 acres (5.7 ha) and included additional Tudor Revival and Bungalow/craftsman architecture, as well as Colonial Revival architecture. The increase area is roughly bounded by Sixteenth Avenue South from Fifteenth Street to a line south from Eighteenth Street.
