= William Leslie Welton =

American architect (1874–1934)

William Leslie Welton (1874 – 1934) was an American architect. Some of his works are listed in the U.S. National Register of Historic Places.

== Works ==
Notable works include:

- City National Bank, 2301 University Blvd., Tuscaloosa, AL (Welton, William Leslie) 1922 NRHP-listed
- Empire Building, 1928 1st Ave., N., Birmingham, AL (Welton, William Leslie) NRHP-listed
- First Christian Church Education Building, 2100 7th Ave. N., Birmingham, AL (Welton, William Leslie) NRHP-listed
- First National-John A. Hand Building, 17 N. 20th St., Birmingham, AL (Welton, William Leslie) NRHP-listed
- Orlando Apartments, 2301 Fifteenth Ave. S., Birmingham, AL (Welton, William Leslie) NRHP-listed
- Quinlan Castle, 2030 9th Ave., S., Birmingham, AL (Welton, William Leslie) NRHP-listed
- Walker County Hospital, 1100 7th Ave., Jasper, AL (Welton, William Leslie) NRHP-listed
- Edward Fenns Whitman House, 200 Thomas Ave., Boaz, AL (Welton, William Leslie) NRHP-listed
- One house in the Pinehurst Historic District, in Tuscaloosa, Alabama, NRHP-listed
- One or more works in the Chestnut Hill Historic District, roughly bounded by Highland Ave. and Thirty-first St., Birmingham, AL (Welton, William Leslie, NRHP-listed
