= Washington Street Historic District (Peabody, Massachusetts) =

Historic district in Massachusetts, United States

- U.S. National Register of Historic Places
- U.S. Historic district
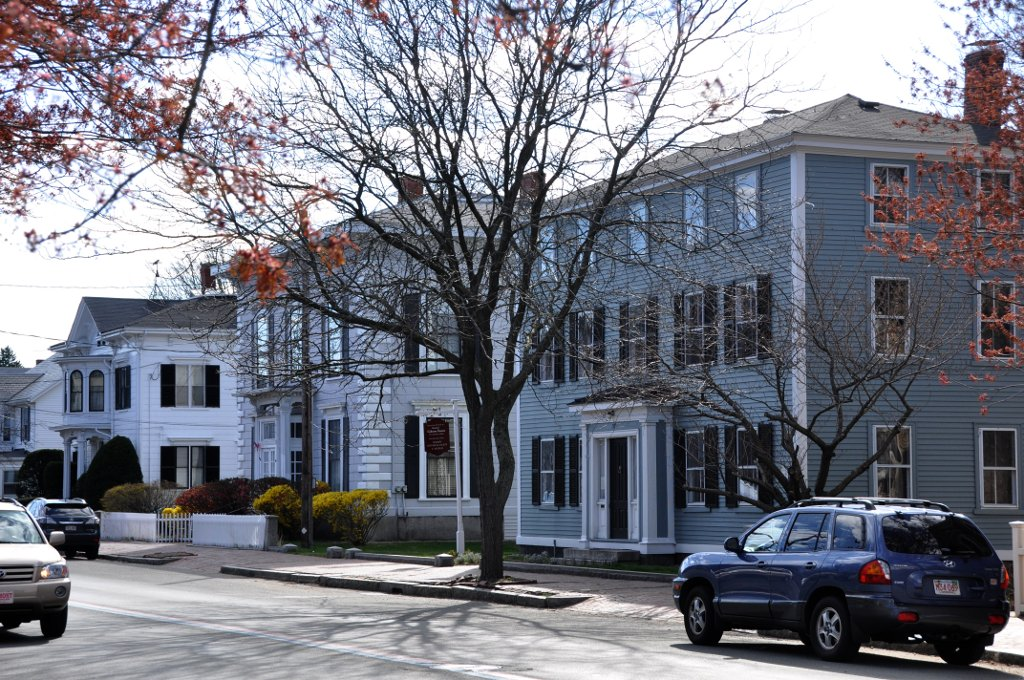
- View along Washington Street

- Location within Massachusetts Location within the United States
- Location: Washington, Holten, and Sewall Sts., Peabody, Massachusetts
- Coordinates: 42°31′23″N 70°55′28″W
- Area: 12.8 acres (5.2 ha)
- Built: 1797
- Architect: Multiple
- Architectural style: Greek Revival, Italianate, Federal
- NRHP reference No.: 85002380
- Added to NRHP: September 12, 1985

The Washington Street Historic District encompasses a fashionable 19th-century residential area near downtown Peabody, Massachusetts. It extends along Washington, Holten, and Sewall Streets, and is where business and civic leaders of the community built their homes. The district was added to the National Register of Historic Places in 1985.

== Description and history ==
The city of Peabody was originally part of Salem, and was, after a series of political divisions, incorporated separately as South Danvers in 1855. It was renamed Peabody, after philanthropist George Peabody, in 1868, and was reincorporated as a city in 1911. What is now Washington Street was laid out in 1750 as part of a new post road between Salem and Boston, running east–west along what is now Main Street, but turning south before reaching Peabody Square. The corner was the site of an 18th-century tavern, and houses and small businesses began to line the street. The oldest surviving house on Washington Street is the 1810 Gen. Gideon Foster House, now a local museum. Another early 19th-century house is that of Abel Proctor (c. 1830), a Federal period house built for a tannery owner. The district is also home to the 1836 United Methodist Church; one of the district's few non-residential buildings, it was moved here from Peabody Square in 1843.

The historic district is bounded on the north by Main Street, and extends south along Washington Street to Aborn Street. It also includes a cluster of similar period buildings on Sewall Street and Holten Street, the latter running parallel to and east of Washington Street. The district is characterized by uniform setbacks on each street (larger on Washington and smaller on the other two streets), with mainly wood-frame houses two or three stories in height. They are in a diversity of styles, having been built at various stages in Peabody's 19th-century economic history. The largest number of houses have elements of Greek Revival or Italianate styling.

== See also ==
- National Register of Historic Places listings in Essex County, Massachusetts
