= Caplewood Drive Historic District =

- U.S. National Register of Historic Places
- Alabama Register of Landmarks and Heritage
- Location within Alabama
- Location: Caplewood Drive, Tuscaloosa, Alabama
- Coordinates: 33°12′47″N 87°33′22″W
- Area: 11 acres (4.5 ha)
- Built: 1922
- Built by: J.D. Caples
- Architect: George P. Turner
- Architectural style: Bungalow/craftsman, Mission/spanish Revival, English Cottage
- NRHP reference No.: 85001159

Significant dates
- Added to NRHP: May 30, 1985
- Designated ARLH: April 11, 1984

Caplewood Drive Historic District, in Tuscaloosa, Alabama, is a residential historic district which was listed on the National Register of Historic Places in 1985. It included 37 contributing buildings out of a total of about 45 buildings, on 11 acres (4.5 ha).

The district runs along the long narrow lane of Caplewood Drive, originally known as Caplewood Terrace, south to its intersection with University Boulevard in Tuscaloosa. It is between downtown Tuscaloosa and the University of Alabama campus. Specifically it includes 1418 University Blvd. and 21–27; 301–329; 400–430; 1309, 1315, 1409, 1411, 1415, 1416 Caplewood Drive.

It is a set of modest bungalows and cottages built primarily during the 1920s and 1930s by local builders, using common building materials and designs which happen to achieve a kind of unity.

The street was developed by J. D. Caples, Sr. (1860–1934) in 1922 along a creek and a natural ravine. Low areas were filled by dirt excavated in the construction of the NRHP-listed City National Bank, and sewers and water pipes were installed by manual labor. Caples paved the street and planted trees. Caples himself built five or six of the homes; his son-in-law B.D. Sumner built three; only one is known to be designed by an architect, being the one at #33 designed by Birmingham architect George P. Turner.

It includes one or more Craftsman bungalows, as well as mission/Spanish revival and English Cottage styles.

== See also ==
- Audubon Place Historic District, a contemporary development
