= West End Masonic Temple =

- U.S. National Register of Historic Places
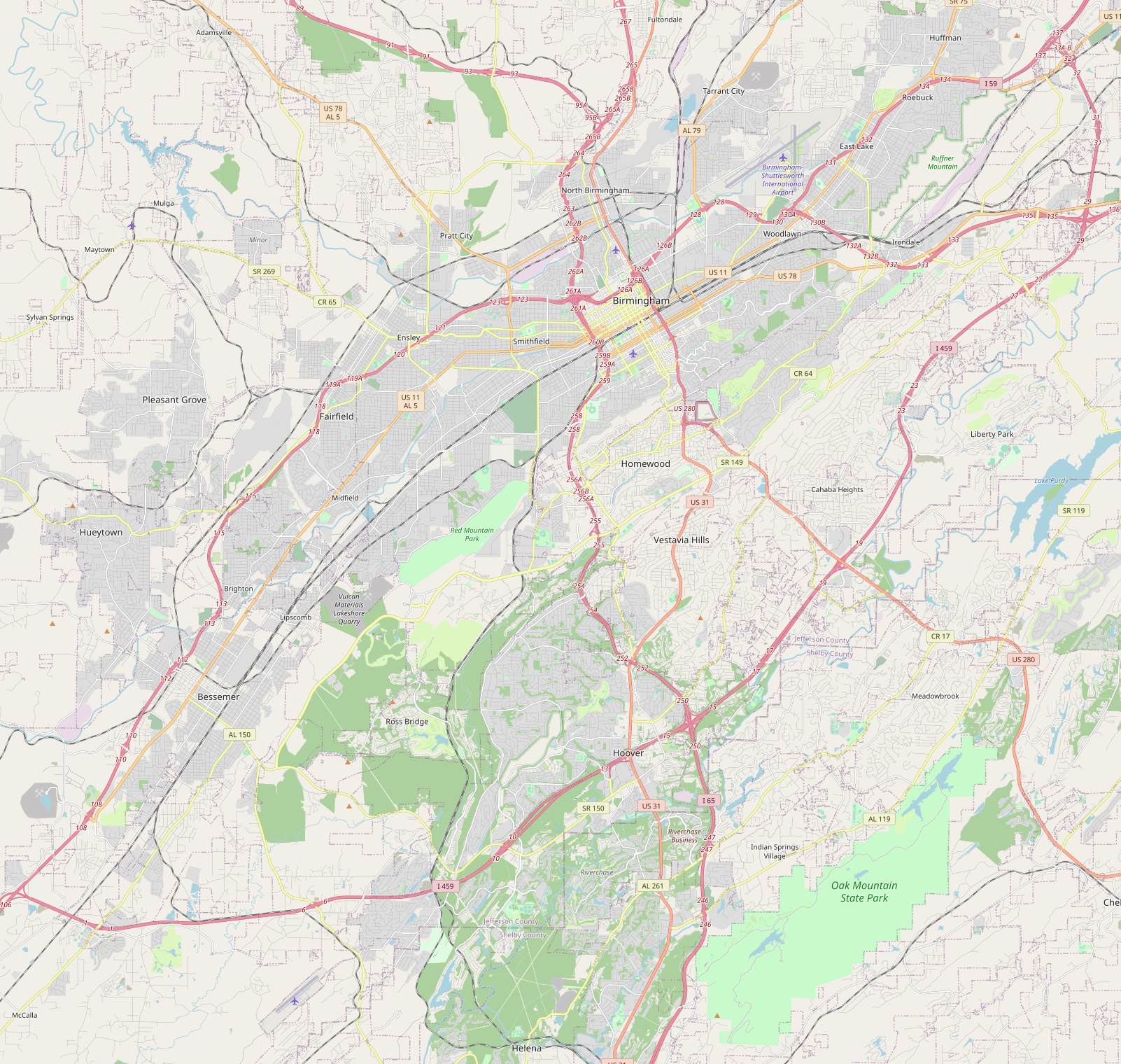
- Location within Birmingham, Alabama Location within Alabama Location within the United States
- Location: 1346 Tuscaloosa Ave., Birmingham, Alabama
- Coordinates: 33°29′34″N 86°51′18″W
- Area: less than one acre
- Built: 1926
- Architect: David Oliver Whilldin
- Architectural style: Neoclassical
- NRHP reference No.: 87001417
- Added to NRHP: August 27, 1987

The West End Masonic Temple is a Masonic building in Birmingham, Alabama. It was constructed in 1926. The temple served the masonic community until 1985, when it was sold and converted to office space. The building was destroyed in a fire on New Years Day, 1996.

The building was listed on the National Register of Historic Places in 1987, and in 2009, despite being gone for many years, was still listed.
