= Stephen Foster House (Topsfield, Massachusetts) =

Historic house in Massachusetts, United States

- U.S. National Register of Historic Places
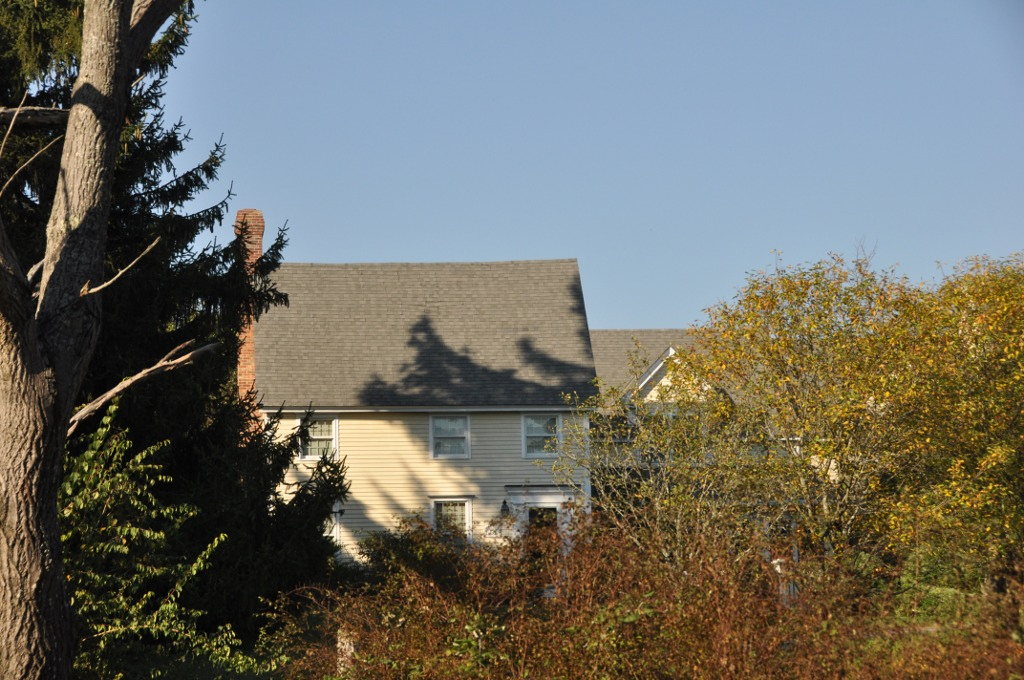

- Location within Massachusetts Location within the United States
- Location: 109 North Street, Topsfield, Massachusetts
- Coordinates: 42°39′35″N 70°56′2″W
- Built: c. 1690 (MACRIS)
- Architectural style: Colonial
- MPS: First Period Buildings of Eastern Massachusetts TR
- NRHP reference No.: 90000262
- Added to NRHP: March 9, 1990

The Stephen Foster House is a historic house in a rural area of Topsfield, Massachusetts. It is a rare instance of a First Period house (built c. 1690) in which its original footprint is still readily discernible, and has not been obscured by subsequent modifications. The only immediately overt exterior indication of the house's great age is the steep pitch of its roof. It is a 2 1/2-story wooden house framed with massive oak timbers. It is a "single cell" house, only three asymmetrically placed window bays wide and one room deep, with a chimney on the left side. Its exterior was complete restyled in a 19th-century vernacular style.

The house was listed on the National Register of Historic Places in 1990.

== See also ==
- List of the oldest buildings in Massachusetts
- National Register of Historic Places listings in Essex County, Massachusetts
