= Downtown Tuscaloosa Historic District =

- U.S. National Register of Historic Places
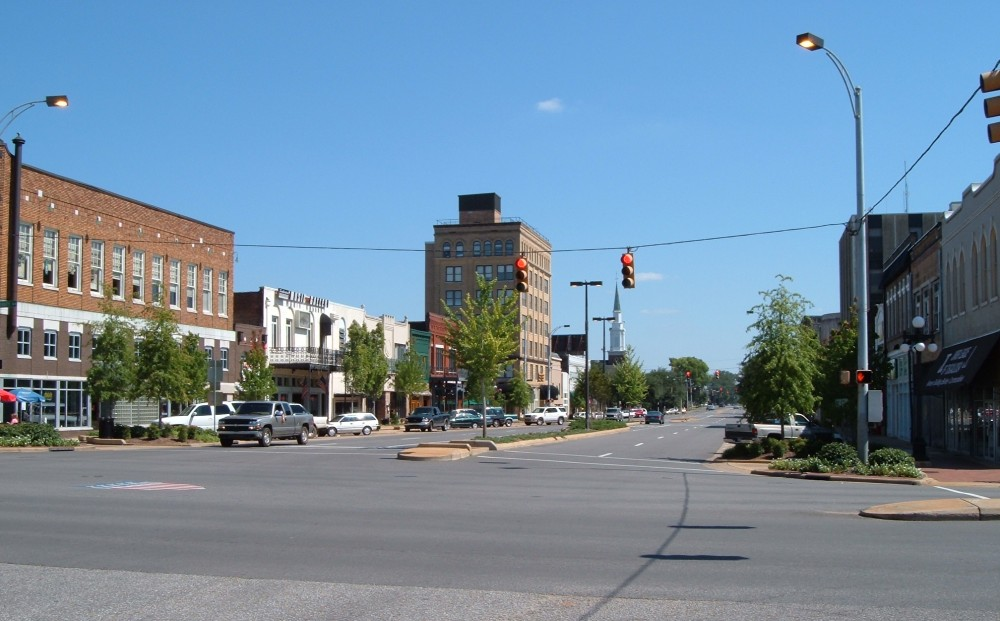
- Greensboro Avenue in the district

- Location within Alabama
- Location: Roughly bounded by Fourth St., Twenty-second Ave., Seventh St., and Greensboro Ave., Tuscaloosa, Alabama
- Coordinates: 33°12′35″N 87°34′02″W
- Area: 27 acres (11 ha)
- Architectural style: Late Victorian, Late 19th And 20th Century Revivals, Modern Movement, Classical Revival
- NRHP reference No.: 86001084 (original); 88003242 (increase)

Significant dates
- Added to NRHP: May 15, 1986
- Boundary increase: January 26, 1989

The Downtown Tuscaloosa Historic District is a historic district which was first listed on the National Register of Historic Places in 1986. The listing included 50 contributing buildings on 27 acres (11 ha), including the historic city hall of Tuscaloosa. It included a total of 91 buildings, with non-contributing buildings and ones deemed marginally contributing. The listing was expanded in 1989 with the addition of 4 acres (1.6 ha) including eight more contributing buildings.

The original district was roughly bounded by Fourth St., Twenty-second Ave., Seventh St., and Greensboro Ave. It includes the separately-NRHP-listed Bama Theatre-City Hall Building and City National Bank (1922).
