= Edward Fenns Whitman House =

Historic house in Alabama, United States

- U.S. National Register of Historic Places
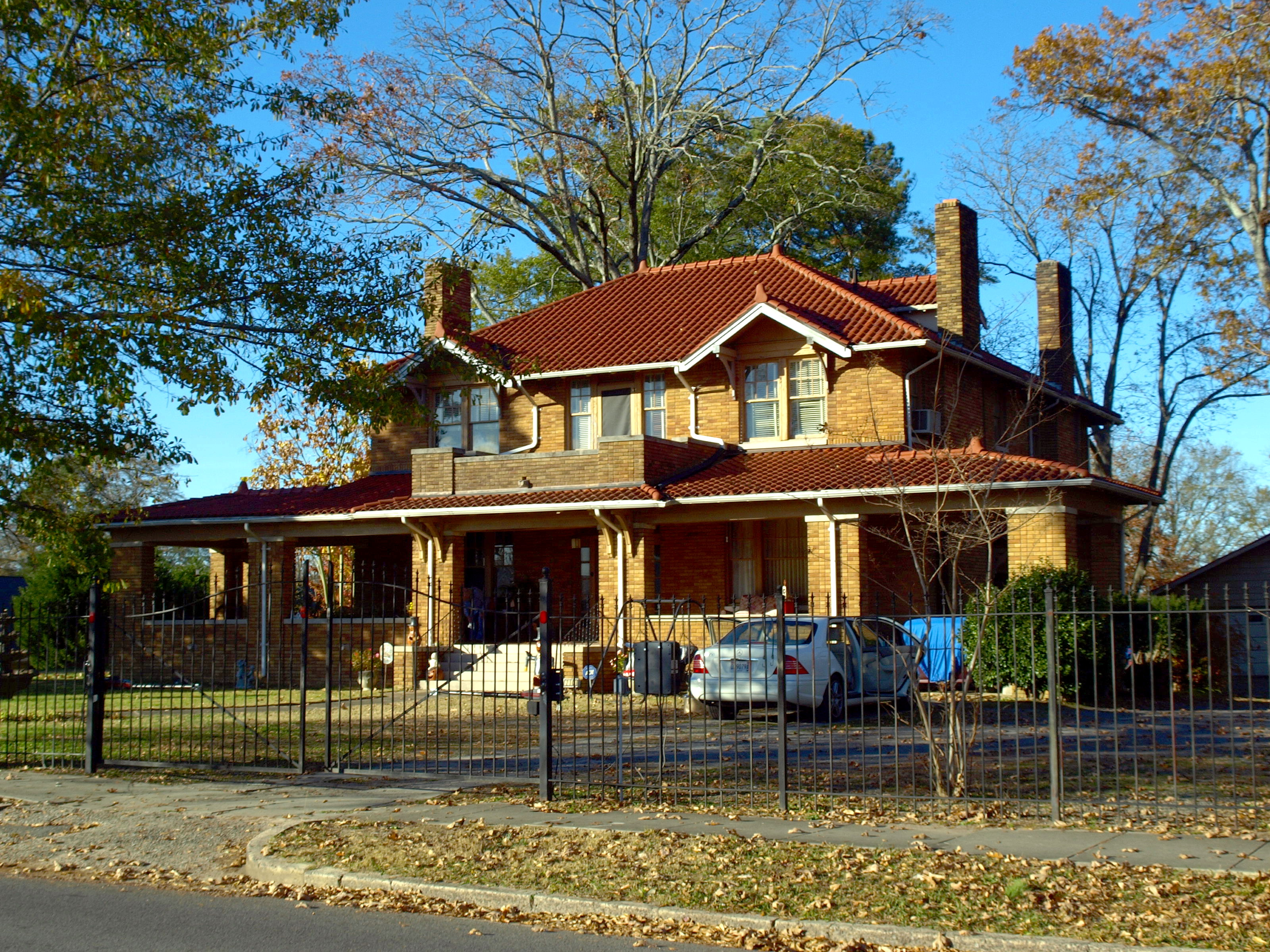
- The house in November 2017

- Location within Alabama Location within the United States
- Location: 200 Thomas Ave., Boaz, Alabama
- Coordinates: 34°12′4″N 86°9′48″W
- Area: 0.5 acres (0.20 ha)
- Built: 1924; 102 years ago
- Architect: William Leslie Welton
- Architectural style: Bungalow/Craftsman
- NRHP reference No.: 97001163
- Added to NRHP: September 26, 1997

The Edward Fenns Whitman House is a historic residence in Boaz, Alabama. The house was built in 1924 by E. F. Whitman, a businessman who has served as Boaz's first mayor in 1896. Whitman was heavily involved in manufacturing development in the new town, and owned interests in a cottonseed oil mill, a fertilizer plant, an ice plant, a cotton mill which produced twine, and petitioned for a new highway (later replaced by U.S. 431) to be routed through Boaz. In 1924, he replaced his original frame house with a brick Craftsman-style home designed by prominent Birmingham architect William Leslie Welton. Built at the height of the Craftsman movement, its tiled roof and porch with heavy brick piers, exposed rafter ends, and rectilinear fireplace mantles are all representative of the style. Whitman sold the house in 1939; it was purchased by Dr. Marston Hunt in 1942 who was one of the founders of the Boaz-Albertville Hospital in 1956. The house was sold in 1992 and converted into a bed and breakfast hotel. The house was listed on the National Register of Historic Places in 1997.
