= Foster Home/Sylvan Plantation =

- U.S. National Register of Historic Places
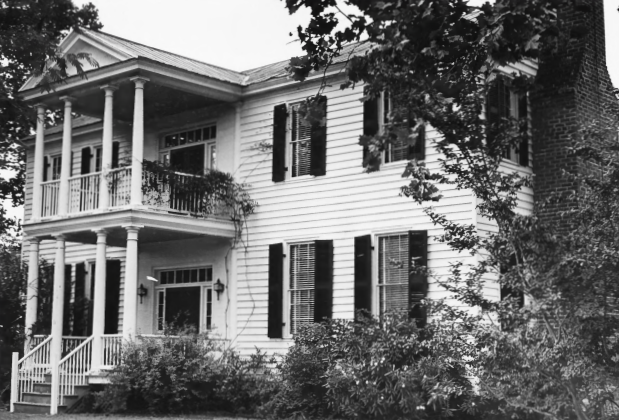
- Front exterior view of the Foster Home in 1984

- Location within Alabama
- Location: Off US 11, near Tuscaloosa, Alabama
- Coordinates: 33°04′49″N 87°42′09″W
- Area: 4.1 acres (1.7 ha)
- Built: c.1825
- Architectural style: I-House
- NRHP reference No.: 85000451
- Added to NRHP: March 7, 1985

The Foster Home, also known as Cedar Hill or Sylvan Plantation, in Tuscaloosa, Alabama, was listed on the National Register of Historic Places in 1985.

Built as the main residence and headquarters of a large slave-labor cotton farm, the main house is an east-facing two-story weatherboarded house, constructed of heart pine upon a brick pier foundation. Erected around 1825, it is an I-house with a one-story, two-room ell at the south rear.

It is located off US 11 south of Tuscaloosa.

The listing also includes a family cemetery as a contributing site, about 50 yards (46 m) west of the house. Enclosed by a cast-iron fence, it contains graves of Robert Savidge Foster, his wife Ann Tompkins Foster, and those of several children and other family members. It has the grave of Wade Foster, a co-founder in 1856 of the Sigma Alpha Epsilon fraternity at the University of Alabama.

== See also ==
- Pinehurst Historic District, Tuscaloosa, which has two "Foster House"s
