= Winsor–Swan–Whitman Farm =

Historic house in Rhode Island, United States

- U.S. National Register of Historic Places
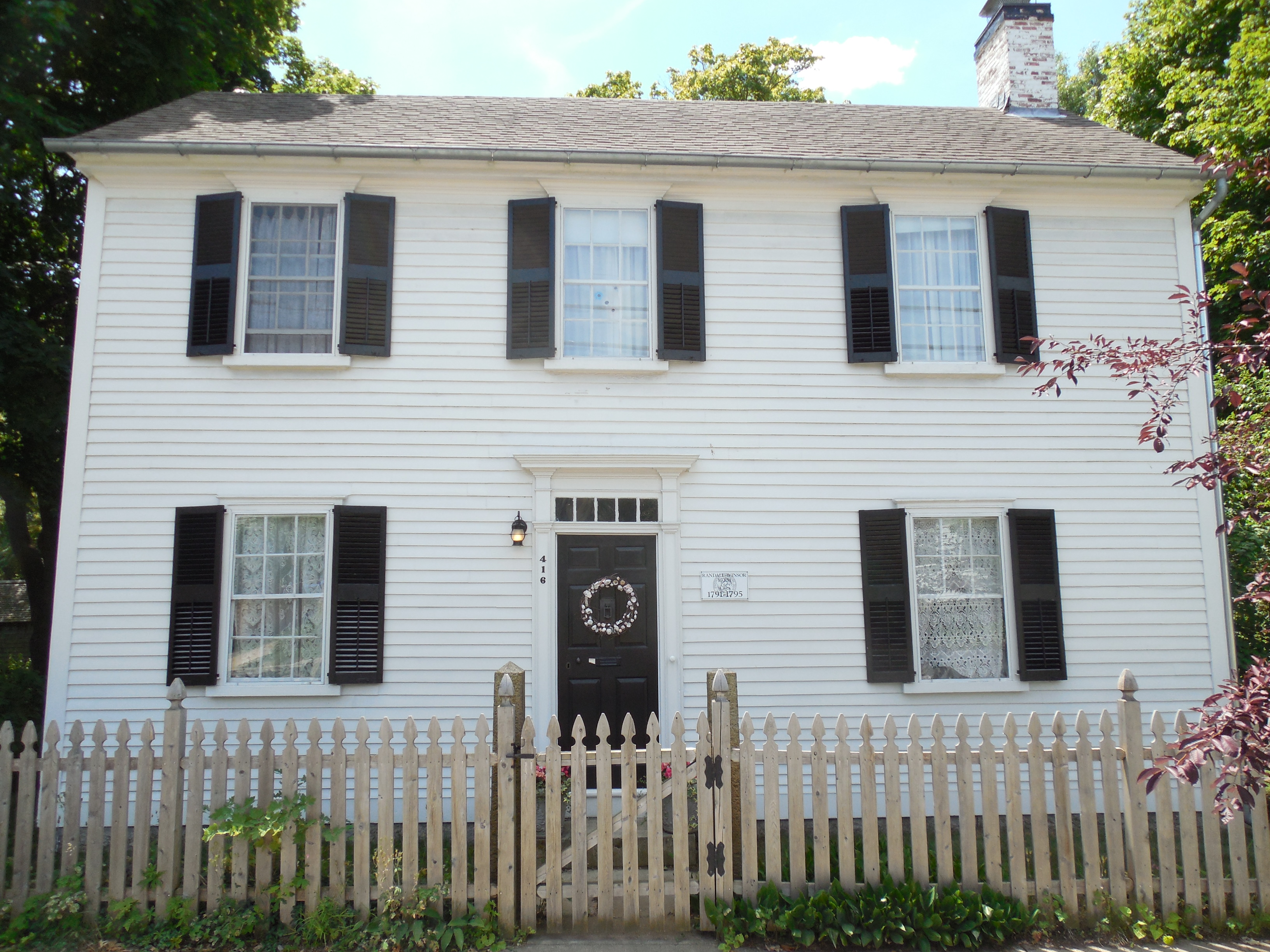
- 416 Eaton Street

- Location within Rhode Island Location within the United States
- Location: Providence, Rhode Island
- Coordinates: 41.8432°N 71.4424°W
- Built: 1742
- NRHP reference No.: 74000006
- Added to NRHP: May 1, 1974

The Winsor–Swan–Whitman Farm is an historic house at 416 Eaton Street in Providence, Rhode Island. The farmhouse was built in 1742 and added to the National Register of Historic Places in 1974.

== Location ==
When it was constructed in 1742, the property was located on the northwest limit of the Providence city line, in a region commonly referred to as Elmhurst. At the time, the area was sparsely populated and "primarily agricultural and had little in common with commercial Providence." As a result, in 1765, the northwestern Mt. Pleasant and Elmhurst areas of the city became part of North Providence. It is now located just west of the Providence College campus.

== Architectural styles and context ==
The original portion of the house, constructed in 1742, is built in the Cape Cod style, which was prominent at the time. Cape Cod style homes were made popular by English colonists who came to America in the 17th century. The style resembled half-timbered houses of England, but the colonists adapted the style to account for inclement New England weather. The building is typical of traditional colonial era Cape Cod Houses in that it is one and a half stories tall, features a steeped roof with side gables, a large central chimney, and a symmetrical facade with a door in the center.

The house's 1815 addition reflects the Georgian Colonial architectural style. It is square and symmetrical in shape, and features a medium pitched roof with a minimal overhang, and a decorative crown over the central door. This section of the house is often mistakenly cited to be of the Federal Style. However, Georgian homes are more square and angular, and Federal style buildings are more likely to have curved, decorative flourishes. Typically, American Federal houses have low-pitched or flat roofs, and feature a semicircular fanlight window, or roof over front door. These features are not present on the addition.

Originally developed in England, the Georgian Style was very popular in New England, and the Eastern Seaboard of the United States, between 1700 and 1785. As architectural historian Leland Roth explains, colonists' "increasing wealth resulted in more frequent travel to England, and an increased awareness among wealthy colonials of what their English counterparts were doing." As a result, wealthy builders hired skilled craftsmen to come over from England, and numerous architectural treatises and pattern books became popular during the time. All these factors increased the popularity of the Georgian style.

The property includes, in addition to the main house, a carriage house, corn crib, well house, schoolhouse and workshop.

== See also ==
- National Register of Historic Places listings in Providence, Rhode Island
