= Gen. Gideon Foster House =

Historic house in Massachusetts, United States

- U.S. National Register of Historic Places
- U.S. Historic district – Contributing property
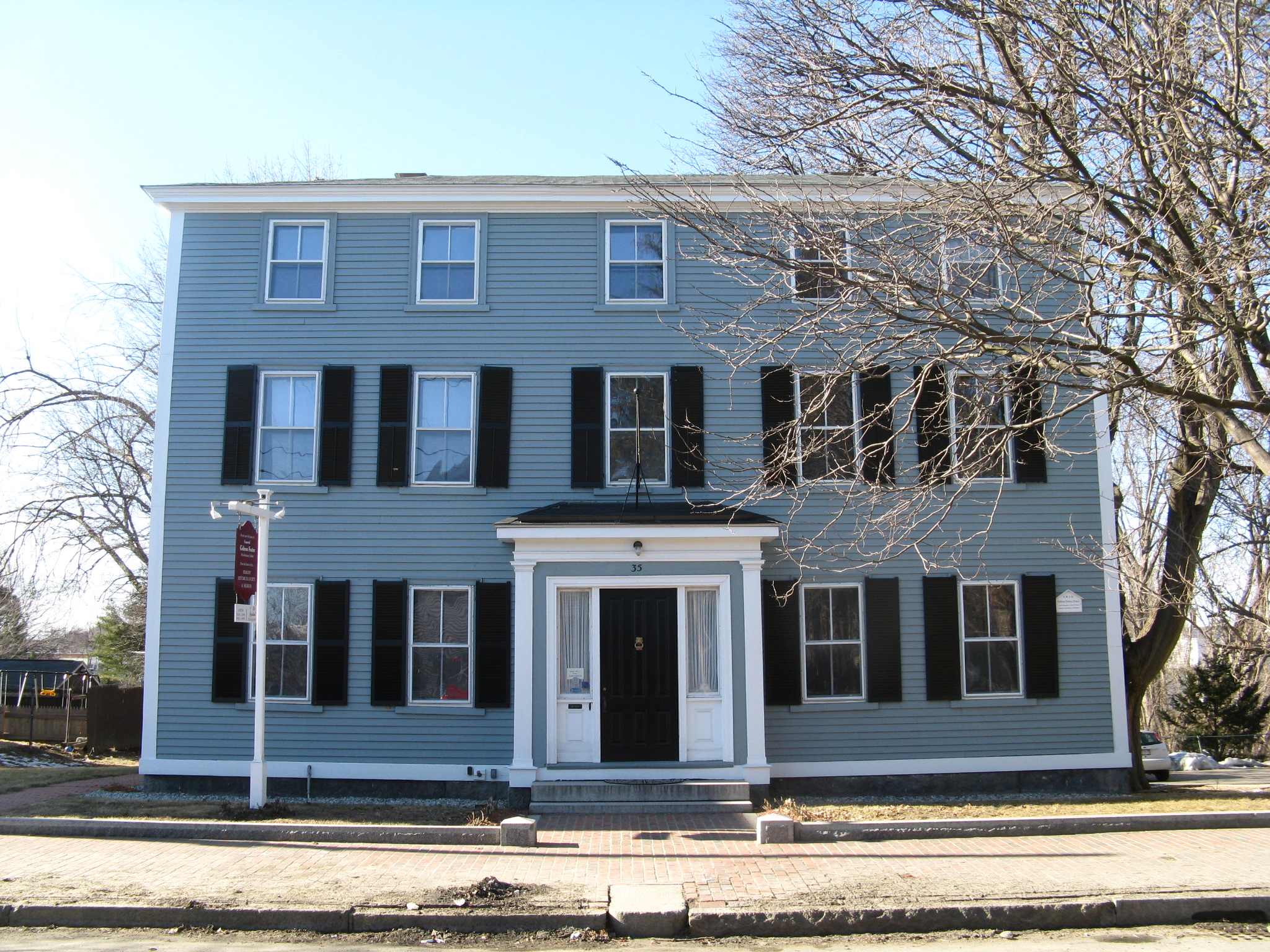
- General Gideon Foster House

- Location within Massachusetts Location within the United States
- Location: 35 Washington Street, Peabody, Massachusetts
- Coordinates: 42°31′22″N 70°55′30″W
- Built: 1810
- Architectural style: Federal
- Part of: Washington Street Historic District (ID85002380)
- NRHP reference No.: 76000287

Significant dates
- Added to NRHP: June 23, 1976
- Designated CP: September 12, 1985

The Gen. Gideon Foster House is a historic house in Peabody, Massachusetts. The two story Federal style wood-frame house was built in the early 1800s at a location on Main Street. The house was bought in 1815 by Gideon Foster, a local veteran of the American Revolutionary War and the War of 1812. The house was later owned by Eben Sutton, a local textile manufacturer, who sold the house so that it could be moved to make way for a larger house on the same lot.

The house was listed on the National Register of Historic Places in 1976, and included in the Washington Street Historic District in 1985. It is the current home of the Peabody Historical Society, which acquired the property in 1916.

== See also ==
- National Register of Historic Places listings in Essex County, Massachusetts
