= Josiah B. Whitman House =

Historic house in Massachusetts, United States

- U.S. National Register of Historic Places
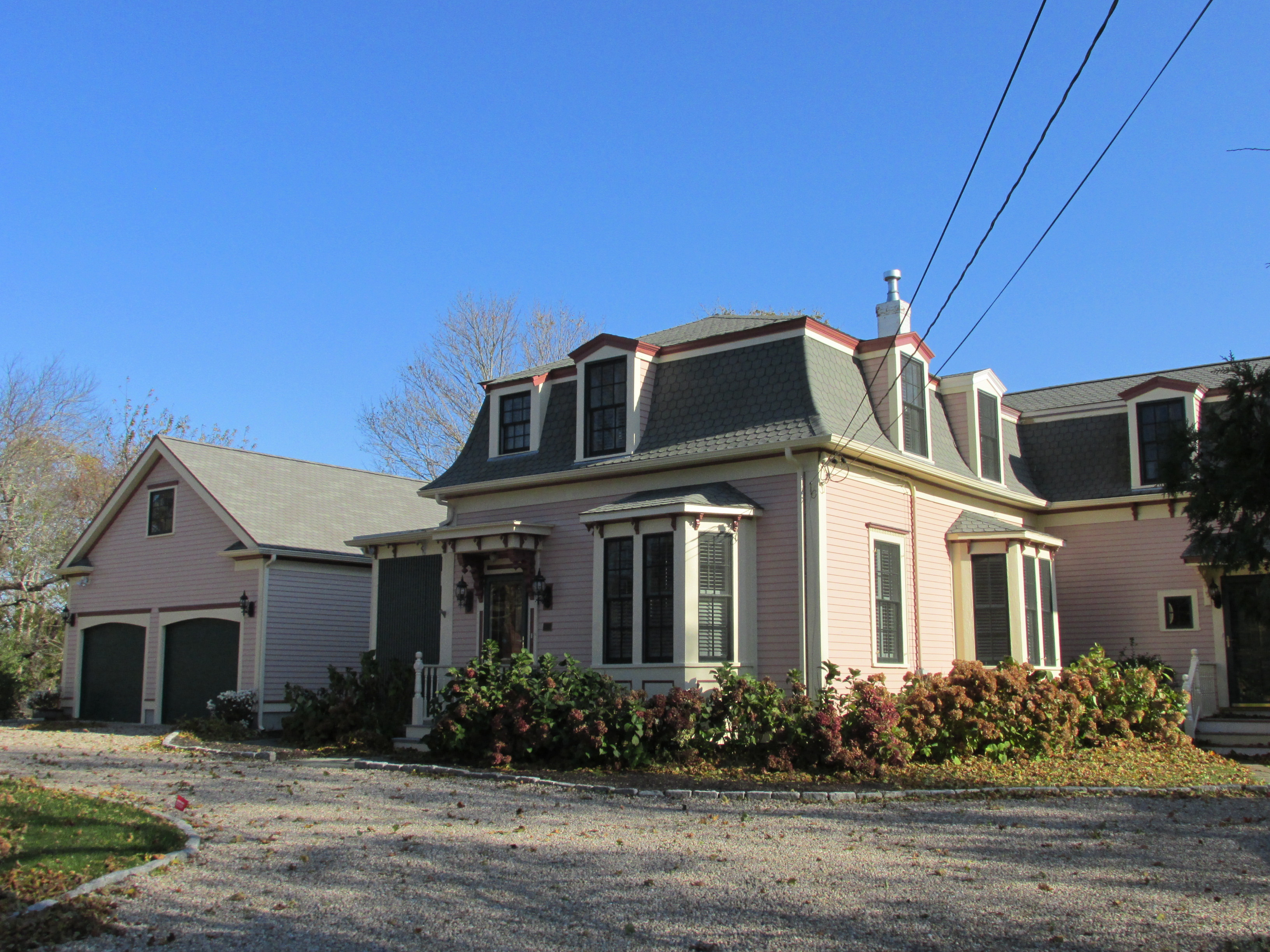
- Josiah Whitman House

- Location within Cape Cod Location within Massachusetts Location within the United States
- Location: 210 Maple Street, Barnstable, Massachusetts
- Coordinates: 41°42′31″N 70°23′21″W
- Built: 1860
- Architectural style: Second Empire
- MPS: Barnstable MRA
- NRHP reference No.: 87000236
- Added to NRHP: March 13, 1987

The Josiah B. Whitman House is a historic house located in Barnstable, Massachusetts.

== Description and history ==
The two story wood-frame house was built c. 1860 by Josiah Whitman. It is a well-preserved local example of vernacular Second Empire styling. It has the characteristic mansard roof, with eaves decorated by heavy brackets. The entry is offset to the left side, with a portico that is also heavily bracketed. A wing, also mansard-roofed, extends to the southwest at the rear of the main block. Bay windows project from the front and side, topped with roofs whose cornices are also bracketed.

The house was listed on the National Register of Historic Places in 1987.

== See also ==
- National Register of Historic Places listings in Barnstable County, Massachusetts
