= Whilldin Building =

- U.S. National Register of Historic Places
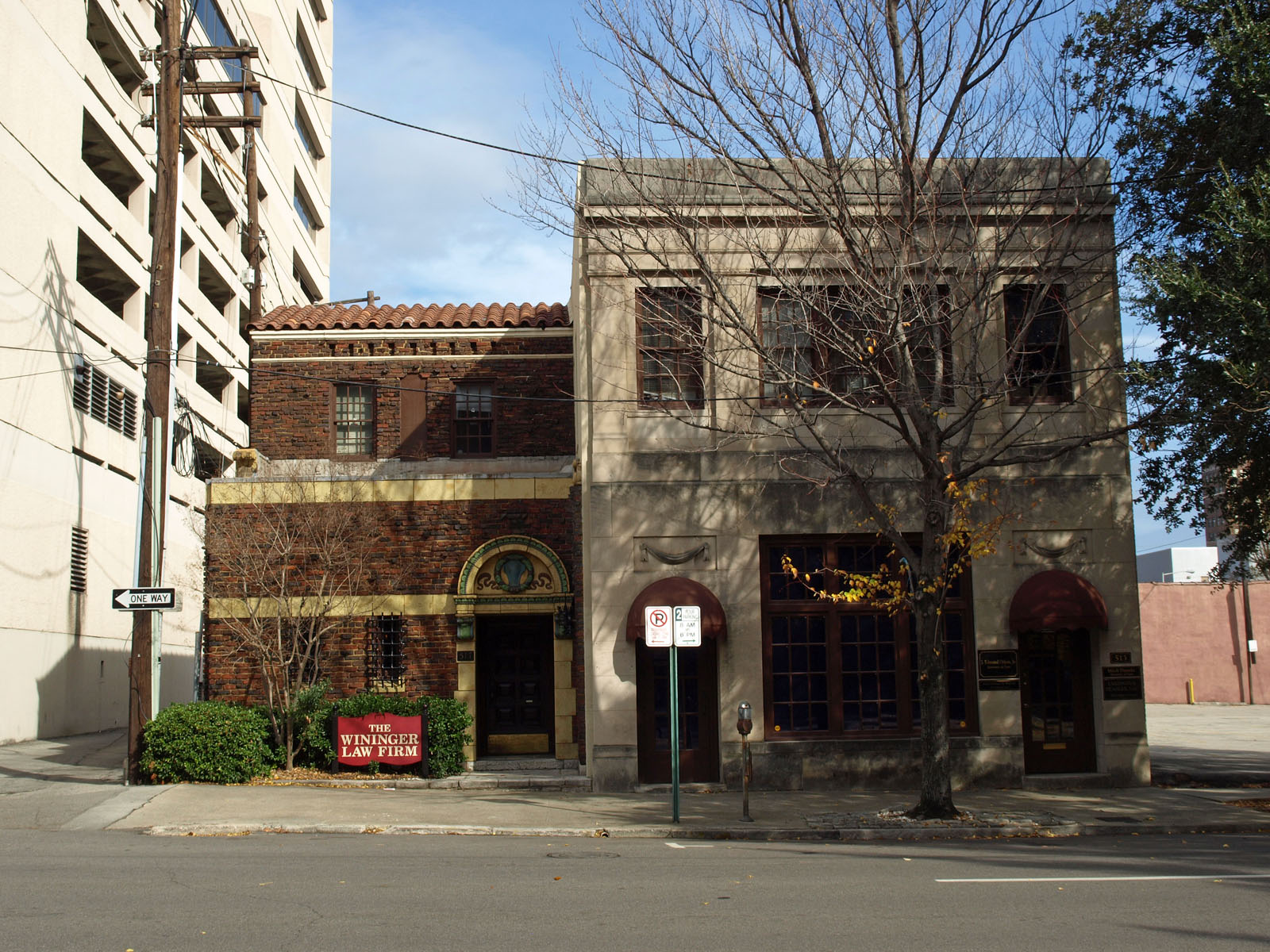
- The Whilldin Building in November 2011

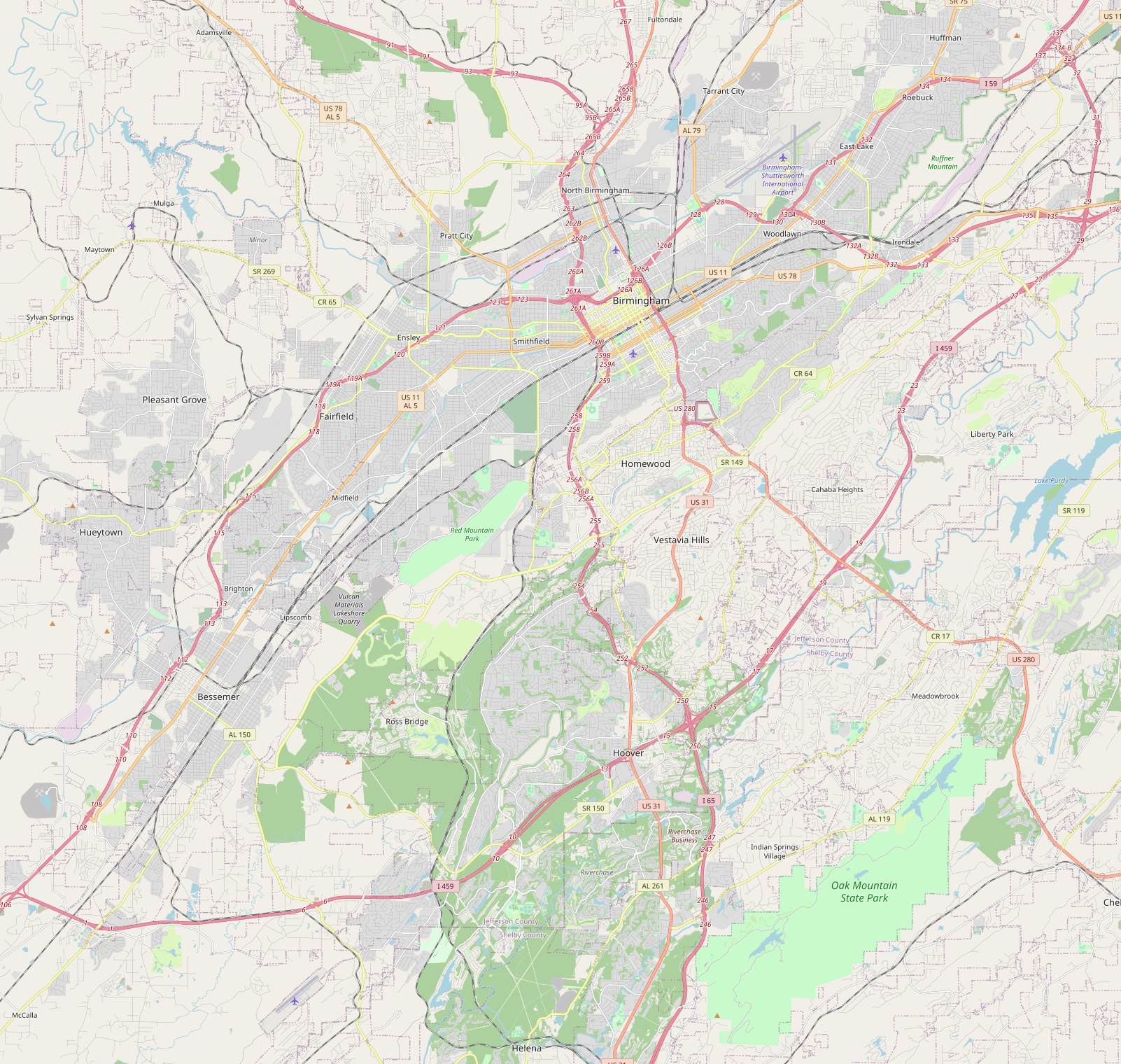
- Location within Birmingham, Alabama Location within Alabama Location within the United States
- Location: 513–517 21st St., N, Birmingham, Alabama
- Coordinates: 33°31′9″N 86°48′25″W
- Area: 0.1 acres (0.040 ha)
- Built: 1923
- Architect: D. O. Whilldin
- NRHP reference No.: 82002044
- Added to NRHP: March 25, 1982

The Whilldin Building is the former office of Alabama architect David Oliver Whilldin. Located on 21st Street North, now Richard Arrington Junior Boulevard North, in Birmingham, Alabama, United States, the building was designed and built by Whilldin during 1923 and 1924 and added to the National Register of Historic Places in 1982. The site is now the office of the Wininger Law Firm.

Whilldin designed the structure to appear as two separate buildings. The larger, white half of the building is covered with a smooth limestone and features four Tuscan pilasters that carry an entablature and the cornice.

The smaller, left half of the building, held Whilldin's personal office. It is set slightly back from the street and faced in dark brick with terra cotta and stone detailing. The most remarkable aspect of the left facade is the entrance. Full-sized drawings detail the ring of acanthus leaves, the beribboned wreath panel, and the consoles that support the arched hood over the entry vestibule. A band of yellow terra cotta continues across the facade from the lintel of the door to the space above the windows. Within this band appears the inscription "D.O. WHILLDIN, ARCHITECT".

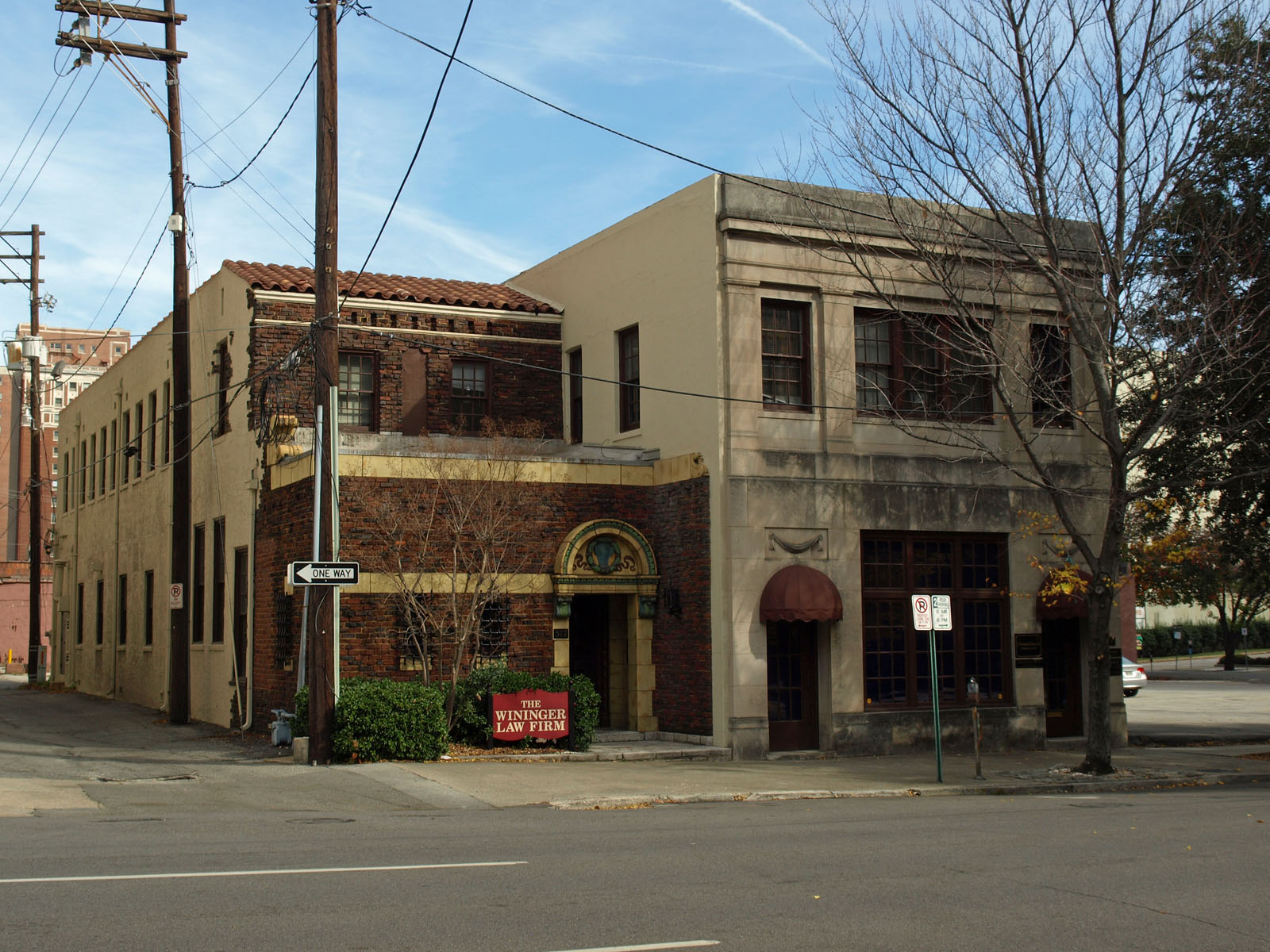
Whilldin Building Facade

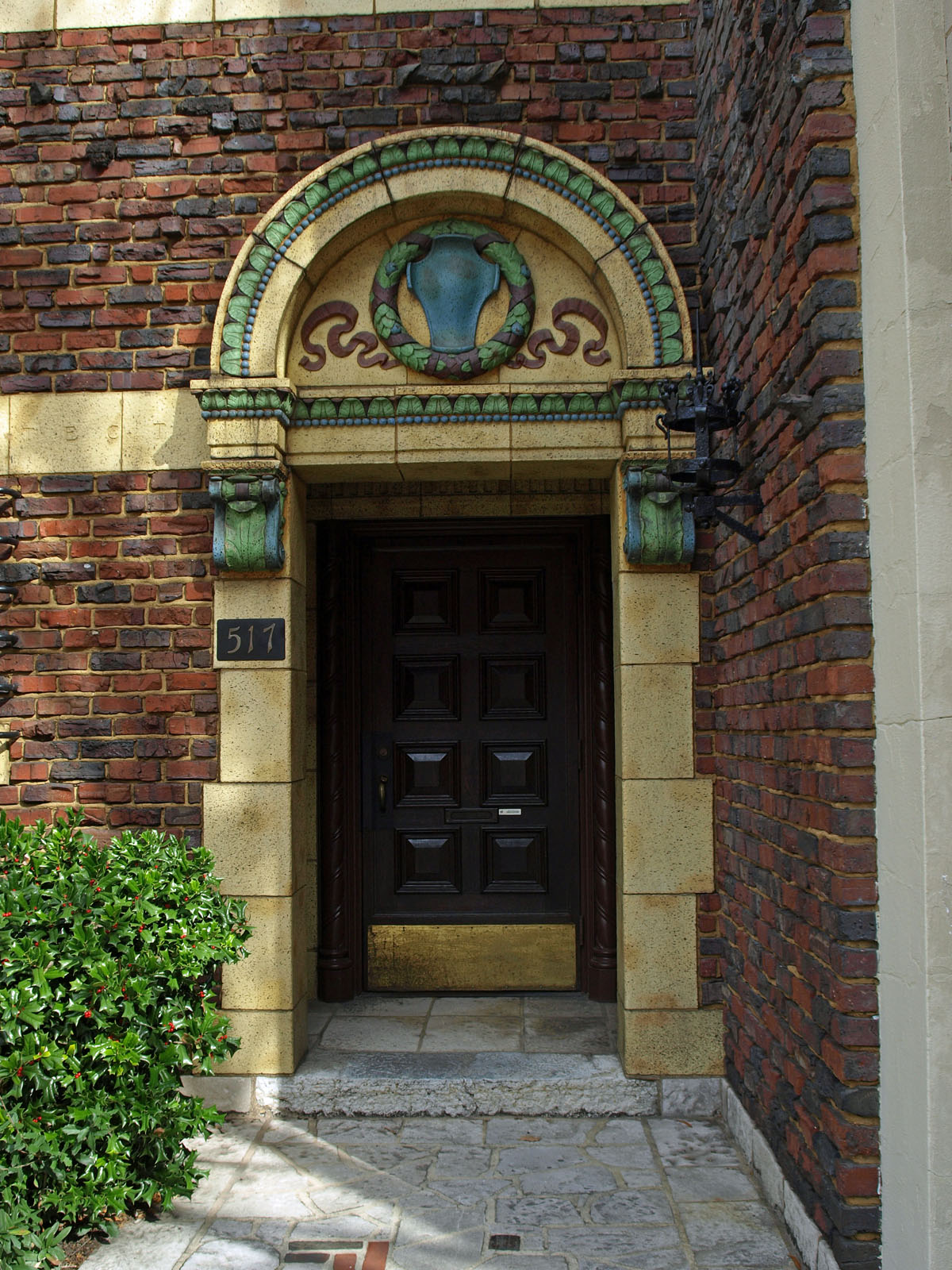
Whilldin Building Entry

In 2012, David Wininger, the current owner of the building, commissioned a New York Yankees themed mural on the side of the structure. Depicted are: Babe Ruth, Lou Gehrig, Joe DiMaggio, Mickey Mantle, Derek Jeter, and Yogi Berra.

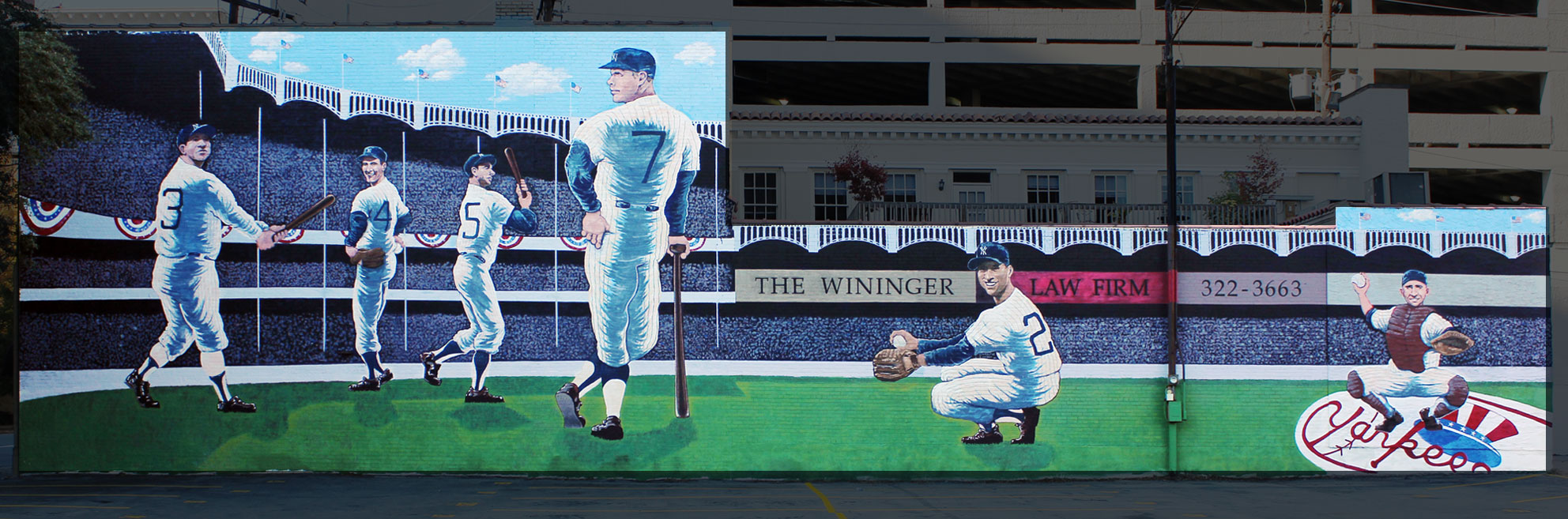
New York Yankees Mural
