= Woodlawn Highlands Historic District =

- U.S. National Register of Historic Places
- U.S. Historic district
- Location within Alabama
- Location: Bounded by 5th Ave. S, Crestwood Blvd., and 56th and 61st Sts. S., Birmingham, Alabama
- Coordinates: 33°32′13″N 86°45′02″W
- Area: 407 acres (165 ha)
- Architectural style: Late Victorian, Late 19th And 20th Century Revivals
- NRHP reference No.: 06000438
- Added to NRHP: May 31, 2006

The Woodlawn Highlands Historic District (also known as the Crestwood North Historic District) is a historic district in Birmingham, Alabama. Birmingham was established in 1871, and grew quickly as a center of mining and manufacturing. Woodlawn was settled soon after the 1814 Treaty of Fort Jackson opened the area to white settlement, and saw growth in the late 19th century as a suburb of Birmingham. The extension of the streetcar line from Birmingham in 1887 prompted developers to expand south of Woodlawn, between the Alabama Great Southern Railroad line and Red Mountain, an area that became known as Woodlawn Highlands.

The houses in the district reflect popular styles at the time of construction; the earliest homes were Victorian and Queen Anne cottages built through the early 20th century. In 1910 Woodlawn, along with other neighboring cities, was annexed into the city of Birmingham. As more industry began to locate in Woodlawn, development in the Highlands shifted to include smaller and simpler homes for laborers in shotgun and hall-and-parlor layouts, alongside Craftsman and American foursquare homes for the professional classes. Throughout the 1920s, bungalows and Tudor Revival homes became the predominant style. Non-commercial buildings also were constructed during the 1920s, including the Woodlawn Infirmary (which was converted into apartments by the end of World War II), a small commercial area along Grand Avenue, and an elementary school. Following the war, a new addition consisting of ranches and minimal traditional houses was built.

The district was listed on the National Register of Historic Places in 2006.
