= Susie Foster Log House =

- U.S. National Register of Historic Places
- Location within Tennessee
- Location: 810 College St., Smithville, Tennessee
- Coordinates: 35°57′01″N 85°48′57″W
- Area: 2.5 acres (1.0 ha)
- Built by: Foster, Susie; et.al.
- Architectural style: Colonial Revival
- NRHP reference No.: 07000665
- Added to NRHP: July 3, 2007

The Susie Foster Log House, at 810 College St. in Smithville, Tennessee, is a log house which was listed on the National Register of Historic Places (NRHP) in 2007. The NRHP listing included two contributing buildings.

It was deemed notable as "an unusual and intact local example of a twentieth century log house that was constructed solely of materials that were salvaged from other buildings. Built between 1946-50 the majority of the materials were taken from log buildings that were to be inundated by the Center Hill Dam project. Materials were also taken from the Absalom Reams House formerly located on Short Mountain, and from the Webb Hotel, a fifteen room, antebellum hotel in Smithville that was torn down in 1948. The Susie Foster Log House retains its original materials and has a high level of integrity. With its exposed logs on the exterior and interior, original mantel, windows, and doors, it exemplifies the twentieth century Colonial Revival movement."

It was built by Susie Foster (1892-1984), who obtained the property on which the house stands around 1915.
