= Samuel Foster House =

Historic house in Massachusetts, United States

- Formerly listed on the U.S. National Register of Historic Places
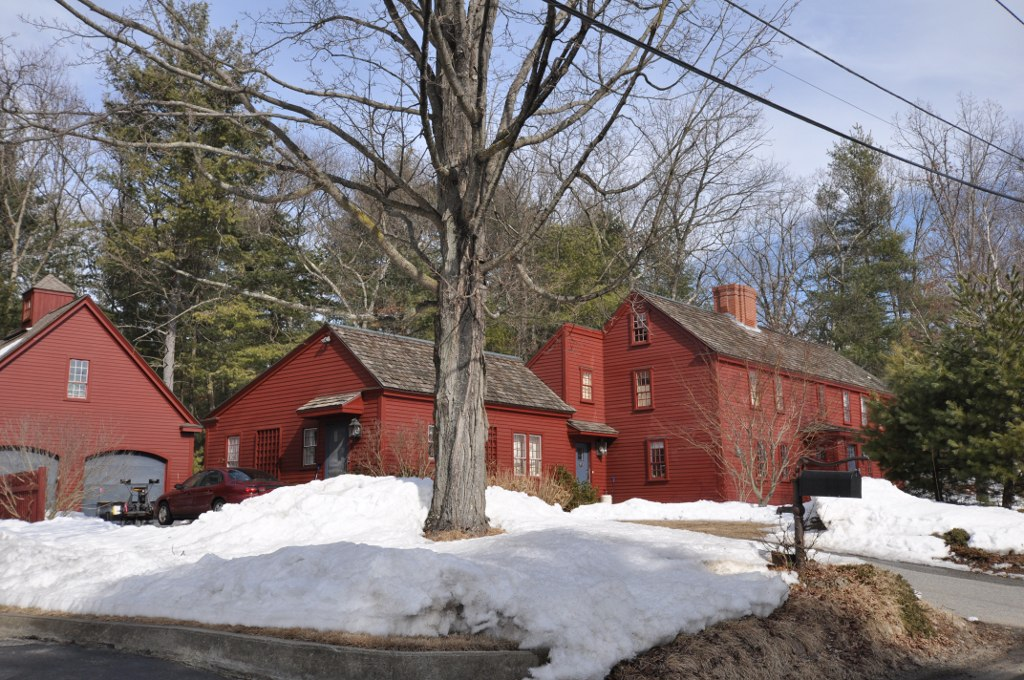

- Location within Massachusetts Location within the United States
- Location: 409 Grove Street, Reading, Massachusetts
- Coordinates: 42°32′31″N 71°7′37″W
- Built: 1710
- Architectural style: Colonial
- MPS: First Period Buildings of Eastern Massachusetts TR
- NRHP reference No.: 90000178

Significant dates
- Added to NRHP: March 9, 1990
- Removed from NRHP: November 6, 2024

The Samuel Foster House (also known as the Foster-Emerson House) is a historic house in Reading, Massachusetts.

Samuel Foster, an early miller and farmer built the house in 1709 and his family resided in the building until Ebenezer Emerson purchased the house from the Fosters in 1769. Emerson served in the American Revolutionary War. The Meadow Brook Golf Club acquired the house and barn in 1912, and groundskeepers lived in the house from 1923 to the 1980s. The house was added to the National Register of Historic Places in 1990. In 1998 the house was moved from the golf course at 288 Grove Street to 409 Grove Street when it was no longer needed by the club, and there was a citywide effort to preserve the building from demolition. It was removed from the NRHP in November 2024.

== See also ==
- National Register of Historic Places listings in Reading, Massachusetts
- National Register of Historic Places listings in Middlesex County, Massachusetts
