= Phineas Foster House =

Historic house in Massachusetts, United States

- U.S. National Register of Historic Places
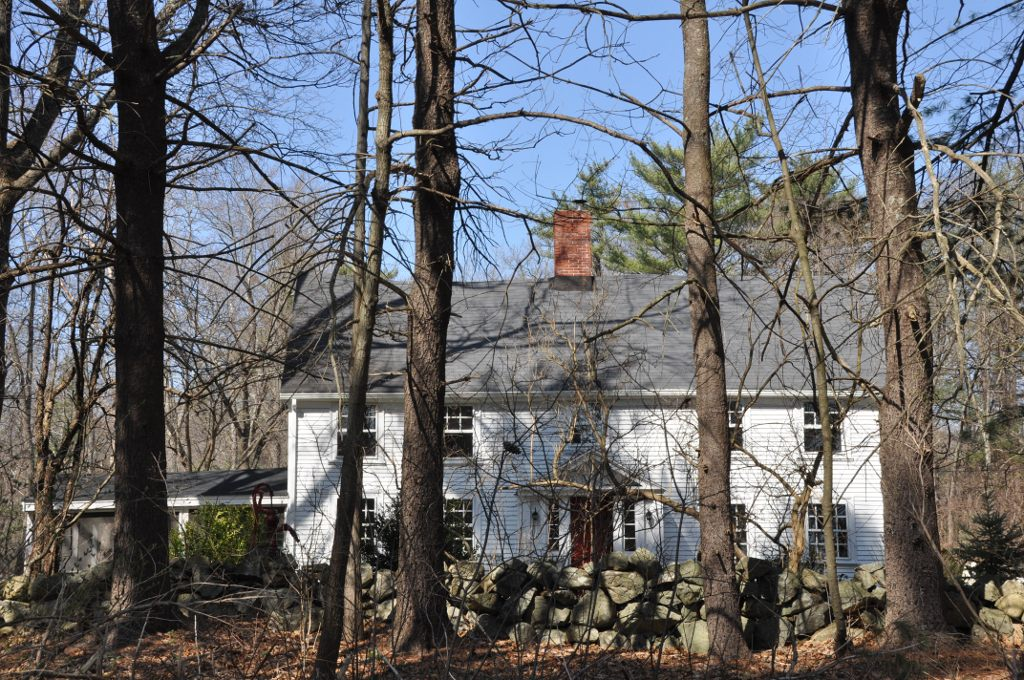

- Location within Massachusetts Location within the United States
- Location: 11 Old Topsfield Road, Boxford, Massachusetts
- Coordinates: 42°38′56″N 70°58′50″W
- Built: 1725
- Architectural style: Colonial
- MPS: First Period Buildings of Eastern Massachusetts TR
- NRHP reference No.: 90000193
- Added to NRHP: March 9, 1990

The Phineas Foster House is a historic First Period house in Boxford, Massachusetts. Like many First Period houses it was built in stages. The first portion, built c. 1725, was a single cell to the right of what is now the central chimney. It was extended with a matching section on the left side of the chimney later in the First Period, and acquired a two-story kitchen ell late in the 18th century, giving the house an L shape. The front porch entry is a Federal period addition, and the central chimney has been rebuilt. The house is named for the owner of the property in 1799.

The house was listed on the National Register of Historic Places in 1990, where it is listed at 15 Old Topsfield Road.

== See also ==
- National Register of Historic Places listings in Essex County, Massachusetts
- List of the oldest buildings in Massachusetts
