= Guild-Verner House =

Historic house in Alabama, United States

- U.S. National Register of Historic Places
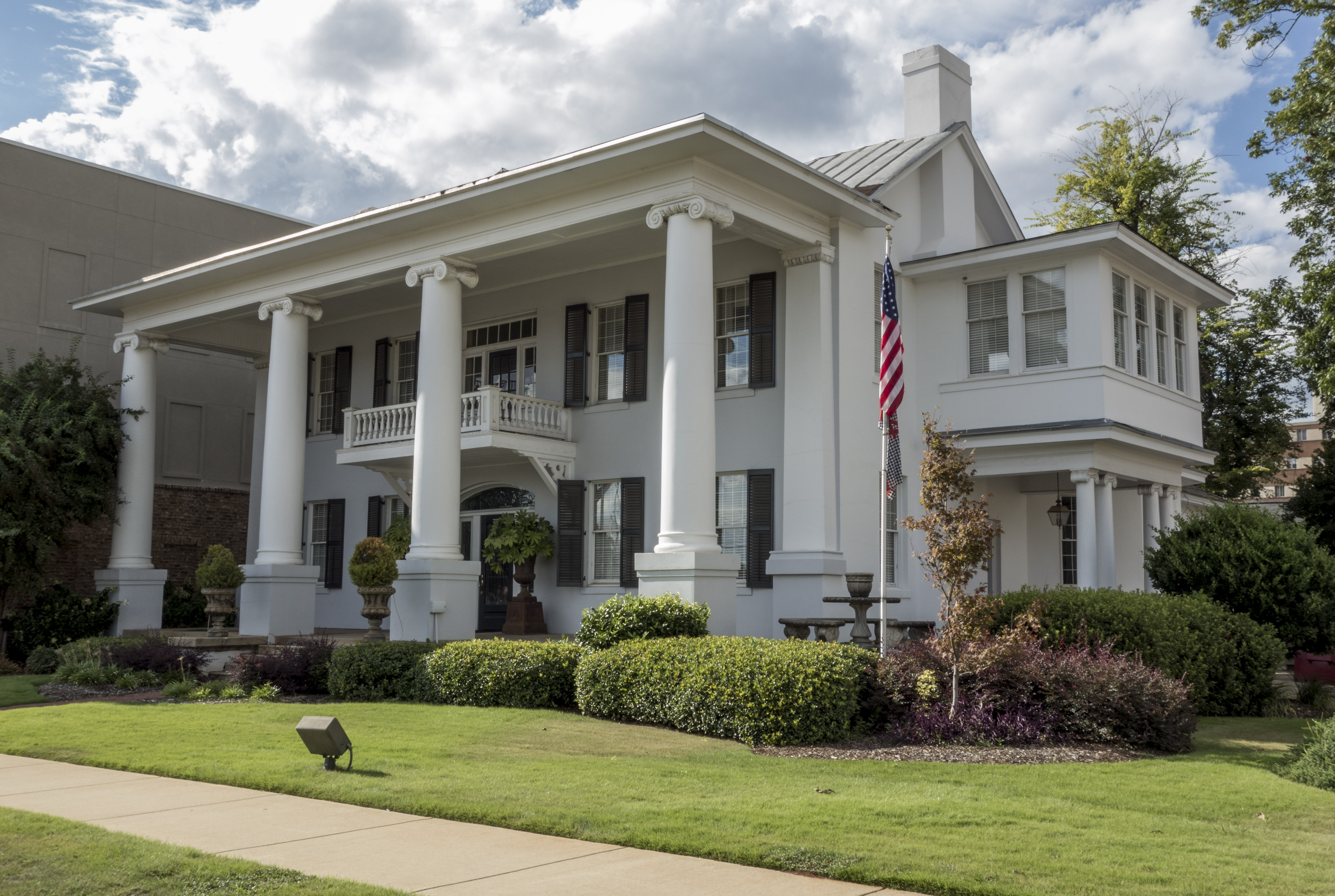
- The Guild-Verner House in 2014

- Location within Alabama Location within the United States
- Interactive map showing the location for Guild-Verner House
- Location: 1904 University Avenue, Tuscaloosa, Alabama
- Coordinates: 33°12′42″N 87°33′43″W
- Area: less than one acre
- Built: 1822
- Architectural style: Georgian
- NRHP reference No.: 73000374
- Added to NRHP: December 4, 1973

The Guild-Verner House is a historic mansion in Tuscaloosa, Alabama, U.S.

== History ==
The house was built for Dr. James Guild, a surgeon, in 1822. In 1881, Guild sold it to Henry Snow, who sold it to Dr. Charles Snow. It was inherited by his daughter Julia Penn and her husband, W. G. B. Pearson, who served as a member of the Alabama House of Representatives. In 1911, it was purchased by C. B. Verner, who also served as a member of the Alabama House of Representatives. It was subsequently used as an office and a restaurant, until it became unoccupied.

== Architectural significance ==
The house has been listed on the National Register of Historic Places since December 4, 1973.
