= Audubon Place Historic District =

- U.S. National Register of Historic Places
- Alabama Register of Landmarks and Heritage
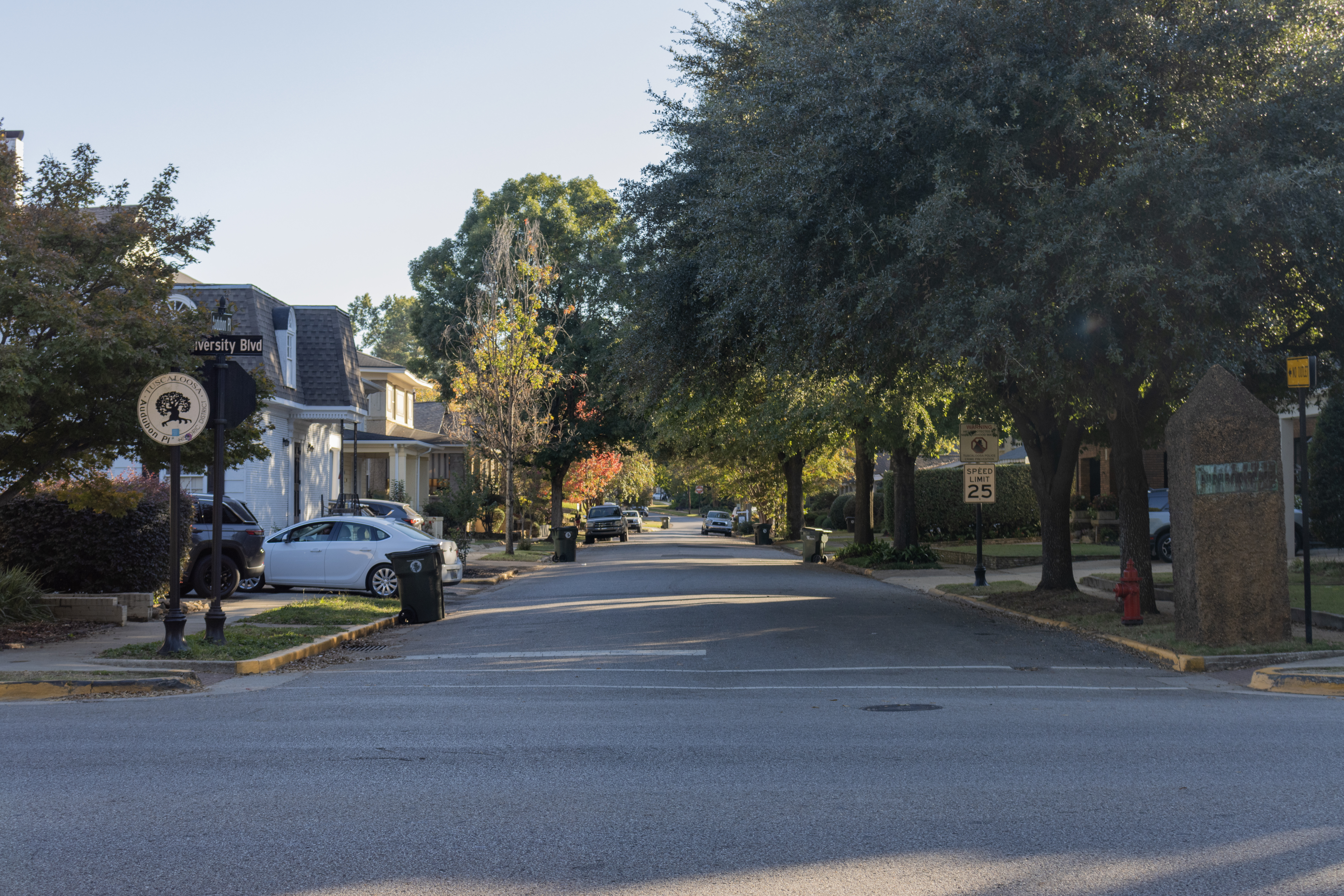
- The entrance to Audubon Place on University Boulevard.

- Location within Alabama
- Location: 1515-1707 (odd) University Blvd. & #8-37 Audubon Pl., Tuscaloosa, Alabama
- Coordinates: 33°12′38″N 87°33′32″W
- Area: 5.4 acres (2.2 ha)
- Architectural style: Bungalow, English Cottage, Colonial Revival
- NRHP reference No.: 85001517

Significant dates
- Added to NRHP: July 11, 1985
- Designated ARLH: November 24, 1982

The Audubon Place Historic District, in Tuscaloosa, Alabama, is a 5.4 acres (2.2 ha) historic district which was listed on the National Register of Historic Places in 1985.

It includes all 37 homes on Audubon Place, a curved cul-de-sac street entered off University Blvd. in Tuscaloosa, as well as five properties going further down University Blvd. Specifically it includes numbers 1515 to 1707 on the odd-numbered side of University Blvd., and numbers 8 to 37 on Audubon Place. Just 32 of the buildings are deemed contributing, however. The entrance to the cul-de-sac is marked by "two massive concrete aggregate piers" and the street gradually climbs upward from there. The street forks, with the right fork going to a circular end, and the left exiting out onto a one-way street.

The neighborhood was designed by landscape architect Samuel Parsons Jr. (1844-1923). It was a development by developer Mims P. Jemison (c.1860-c.1915), "a prominent Tuscaloosa businessman who envisioned the subdivision as a haven for young middle class families, many of whom later achieved higher economic, professional and social status." The street was lined with oak trees planted by Mary Torrey Jemison.

== See also ==
- Caplewood Drive Historic District, a contemporary development, also NRHP-listed in Tuscaloosa
