= City National Bank (Tuscaloosa, Alabama) =

- U.S. National Register of Historic Places
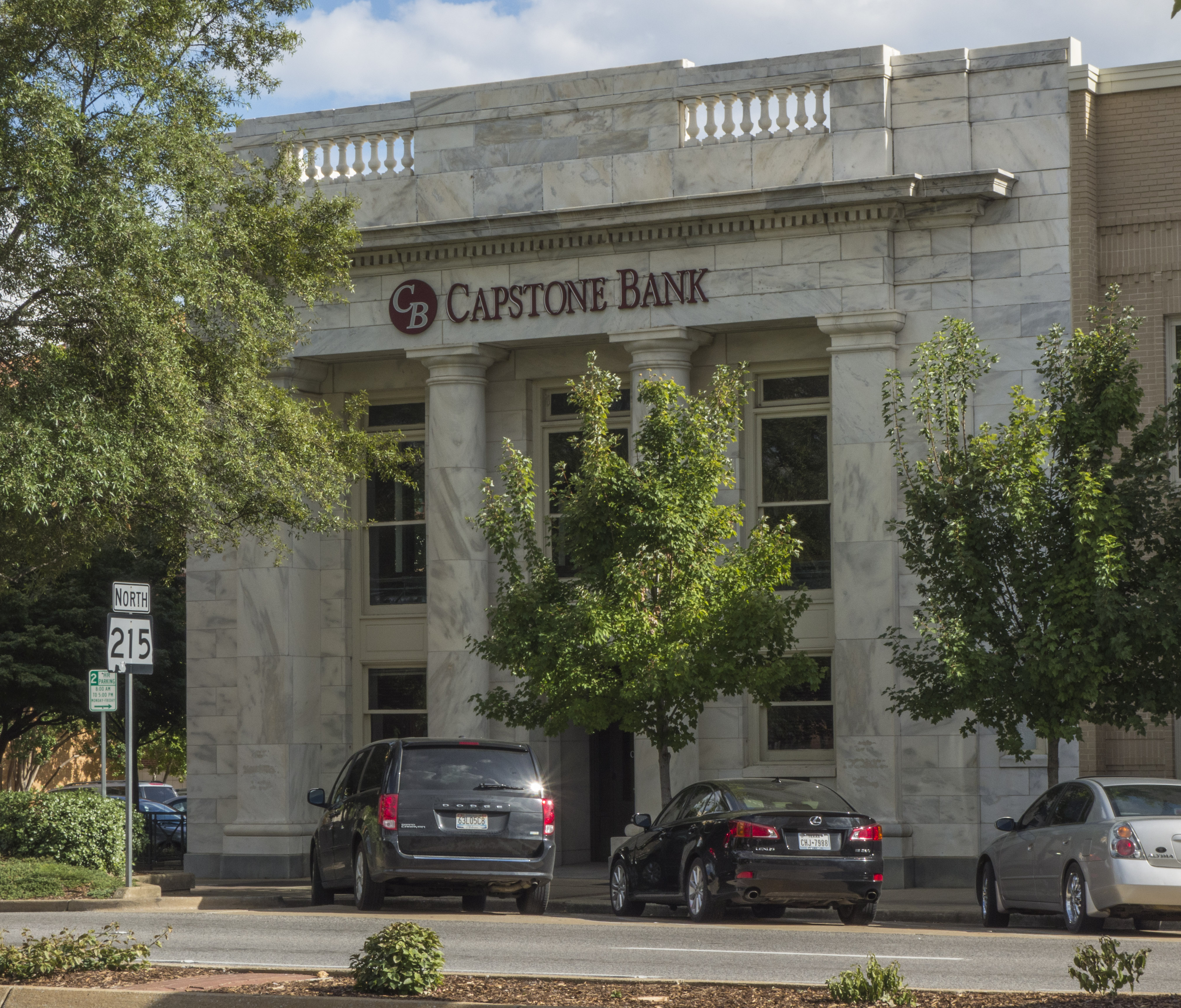
- The former City National Bank from across University Boulevard

- Location within Alabama Location within the United States
- Location: 2301 University Blvd., Tuscaloosa, Alabama
- Coordinates: 33°12′36″N 87°34′1″W
- Area: less than one acre
- Built: 1922
- Architect: William Leslie Welton
- Architectural style: Classical Revival
- Part of: Downtown Tuscaloosa Historic District
- NRHP reference No.: 85000449
- Added to NRHP: March 7, 1985

The City National Bank is an historic building in Tuscaloosa, Alabama. It was designed in the Classical Revival Style by William Leslie Welton and was built in 1922. It was listed on the National Register of Historic Places in 1985.

It is also a contributing building in the Downtown Tuscaloosa Historic District, NRHP-listed in 1985.
