= Pinehurst Historic District (Tuscaloosa, Alabama) =

Historic district in Alabama, United States

- U.S. National Register of Historic Places
- Alabama Register of Landmarks and Heritage
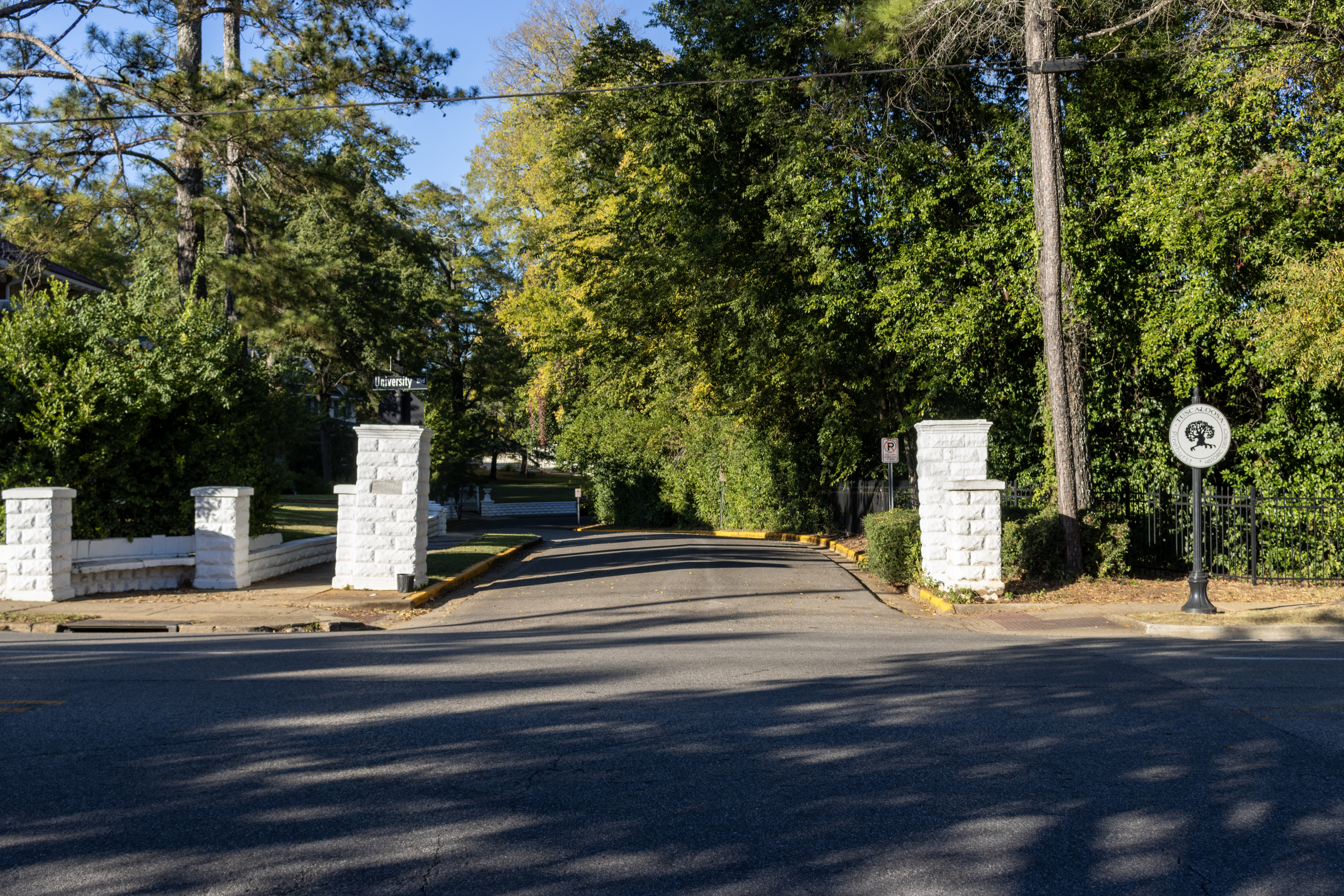
- The entrance to Pinehurst Historic District on University Boulevard.

- Location within Alabama
- Location: 215 and 305 17th Ave., 1--28 Pinehurst Dr., and 6--9 N. Pinehurst Dr., Tuscaloosa, Alabama
- Coordinates: 33°12′48″N 87°33′29″W
- Area: 12.5 acres (5.1 ha)
- Built: 1908
- Architect: C.W. Ayers, et al.
- Architectural style: Colonial Revival, Prairie School, Tudor Revival
- NRHP reference No.: 86001229

Significant dates
- Added to NRHP: June 5, 1986
- Designated ARLH: April 11, 1984

The Pinehurst Historic District in Tuscaloosa, Alabama is a residential historic district which was listed on the National Register of Historic Places in 1986. The listing included 17 contributing buildings and nine non-contributing ones.

It was developed as Tuscaloosa's first garden landscaped residential area, during 1908 to 1935. It was Tuscaloosa's first affluent housing development and includes homes designed by local architects C.W. Ayers and Harry Harring, and one by Birmingham architect William Welton. Features of the garden landscaped residential suburb movement exemplified here include: "a landscape design that relates to the topography, natural plantings, curvilinear streets (represented here by a cul-de-sac), lack of fences, and barriers to through traffic.

Part of the neighborhood borders McEachin Bottom, also known as The Ravine, a steep ravine that stretched from the Black Warrior River to University Boulevard. The ravine was partially filled in 1912, but remained a notable feature of the neighborhood.

It includes 215 and 305 Seventeenth Ave., 1–28 Pinehurst Dr., and 6–9 N. Pinehurst Dr. in Tuscaloosa.

The contributing buildings are:

- Fitts House (1915), 1 Pinehurst Dr.; two-story brick Prairie School home of lumberman and banker William F. Fitts
- Foster House (1919), 2 Pinehurst Dr.; two-story Tudor Revival
- Alston House (1916), 3 Pinehurst Dr.; two-story stone home of Alston family, local bankers
- Foster House (1927), 5 Pinehurst Dr.; two-story stucco, gable roofed house with cross gable projecting end bay
- Blair House (1910), 7 Pinehurst Dr.; two-story stone and stucco, gable roof, with one-story pedimented portico, home of Frank Blair, an "original Pinehurst financier".
- Kay House (1909), 9 Pinehurst Dr.; two-story brick home of Edgar Kay, Dean of School of Engineering, University of Alabama
- 15 Pinehurst Dr. (1910); two-story stone house with Prairie School elements and 1967 addition, home of Thoe Klitske, head of the University's art department
- 16 Pinehurst Dr. (1915); two story stucco house
- 17 Pinehurst Dr. (1922); designed by architect William L. Welton, two-story English bond brick house, with one-story portico over a recessed fanlighted entry.
- Bingham House (1919), 18 Pinehurst Dr.; Tudor Revival
- 19 Pinehurst Dr. (1918); designed by C. M. Ayres, Jr., two-story brick and frame house with English Cottage style influence.
- Goldstein House (1933), 24 Pinehurst Dr.; Spanish Revival house designed by architect C. M. Ayres, Jr.
- 26 Pinehurst Dr. (1922); two-story frame and stucco house with cross gable dormers over end bays.
- 25 Pinehurst Dr. (c.1925); English Cottage, one-story brick house with cross gable projecting end bay, arched hood over entry.
- 305 17th Ave. (1926); two-story brick house with one-story cross gable porch across front facade of center block
- 27 Pinehurst (1932); Tudor Revival brick and stucco house
- 28 Pinehurst (1908); Shingle Style two-story wood shingle duplex, home of owner of Pizitz Department stores.
