= Alexander Foster House =

Historic house in Massachusetts, United States

- U.S. National Register of Historic Places
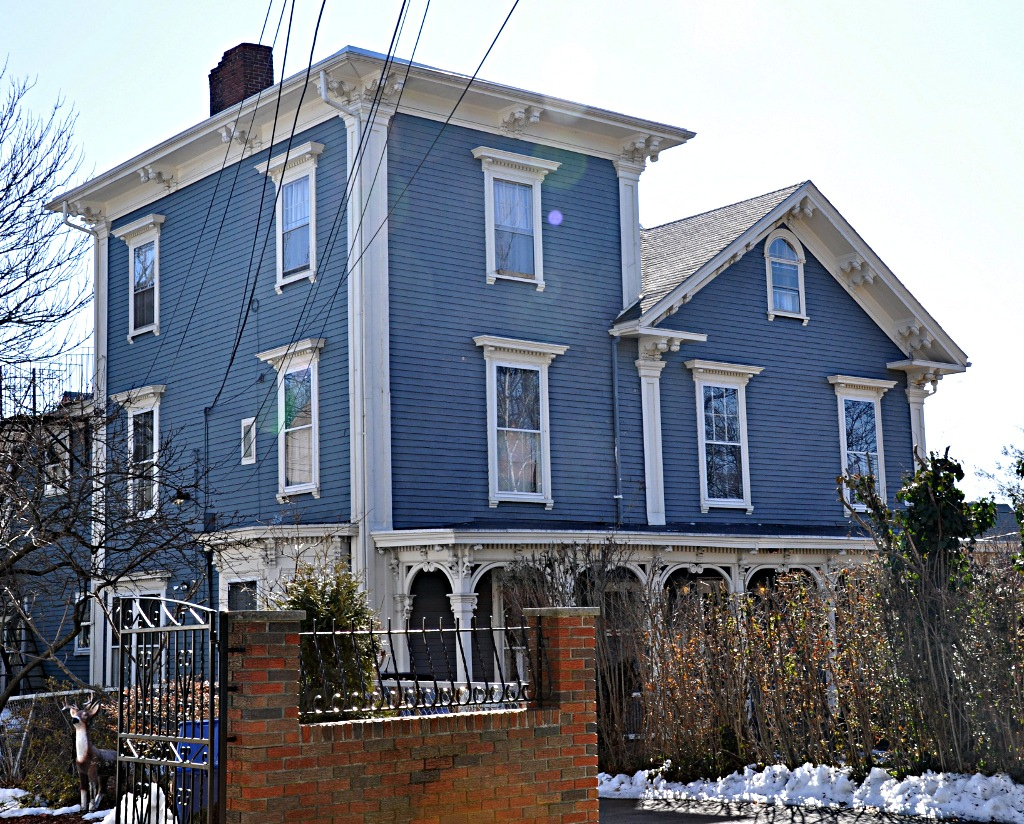

- Location within Massachusetts Location within the United States
- Location: 45 Laurel St., Somerville, Massachusetts
- Coordinates: 42°23′4″N 71°6′15″W
- Area: less than one acre
- Built: c. 1860
- Architectural style: Italian Villa
- MPS: Somerville MPS
- NRHP reference No.: 89001270
- Added to NRHP: September 18, 1989

The Alexander Foster House is a historic house in Somerville, Massachusetts. Built c. 1860, it is one of the city's earliest examples of Italianate architecture, and one of its best-preserved. It was listed on the National Register of Historic Places in 1989.

== Description and history ==
The Alexander Foster House is located in Somerville's central Spring Hill neighborhood, at the northeast corner of Laurel and Greene Streets. It is a three-story wood-frame structure, with a gabled roof section and a broad tower with a shallow-pitch hip roof to its left. The eaves of both roofs are extended, and supported by paired carved brackets. Building corners have paneled pilasters, and a single-story polygonal bay projects on the north side. The west-facing front facade is sheltered by a single-story porch, supported by round columns with bracketed tops, the brackets forming arched openings by meeting between the columns. Most windows are rectangular sash, framed by windows bracketed lintels and sills; the principal exception is a round-arch window located near the gable peak.

Laurel Street was platted in 1843, but development in the area did not begin until somewhat later. This house, built about 1860, was one of the first to be built there, and was soon followed by others. It was built for Alexander Foster, a local lumber dealer. Its layout is based on the Italian villa concept popularized by architect Andrew Jackson Downing in published pattern books. Many of the other period houses in the vicinity have been significantly altered or torn down; this one retains most of its original features.

== See also ==
- National Register of Historic Places listings in Somerville, Massachusetts
