= National Register of Historic Places listings in Montgomery County, Alabama =

Location of Montgomery County in Alabama

This is a list of the National Register of Historic Places listings in Montgomery County, Alabama.

This is intended to be a complete list of the properties and districts on the National Register of Historic Places in Montgomery County, Alabama, United States. Latitude and longitude coordinates are provided for many National Register properties and districts; these locations may be seen together in an online map.

There are 70 properties and districts listed on the National Register in the county, including four National Historic Landmarks. One historic district once listed on the Register has been removed.

This National Park Service list is complete through NPS recent listings posted October 16, 2026.

== Current listings ==
	Name on the Register	Image	Date listed	Location	City or town	Description
1	Alabama State Capitol	Alabama State Capitol	October 15, 1966 (#66000152)	Goat Hill, eastern end of Dexter Ave. 32°22′41″N 86°18′02″W	Montgomery	
2	Alabama State University Historic District	Alabama State University Historic District	October 8, 1998 (#98001228)	915 S. Jackson St. 32°21′51″N 86°17′51″W	Montgomery	
3	Bell Building	Bell Building	December 15, 1981 (#81000132)	207 Montgomery St. 32°22′36″N 86°18′39″W	Montgomery	
4	Brame House		September 17, 1980 (#80000728)	402-404 S. Hull St. 32°22′24″N 86°18′14″W	Montgomery	Building no longer at this location
5	Bricklayers Hall	Bricklayers Hall	July 23, 2020 (#100005355)	530 South Union St. 32°22′17″N 86°17′59″W	Montgomery	
6	Patrick Henry Brittan House	Patrick Henry Brittan House	December 13, 1979 (#79000393)	507 Columbus St. 32°22′57″N 86°18′08″W	Montgomery	
7	Building 800-Austin Hall	Building 800-Austin Hall	March 2, 1988 (#87002178)	2nd St. at Maxwell Air Force Base; 32°22′42″N 86°21′03″W	Montgomery	
8	Building 836-Community College of the Air Force Building	Building 836-Community College of the Air Force Building	March 2, 1988 (#87002182)	Maxwell Boulevard at Maxwell Air Force Base; 32°22′49″N 86°21′07″W	Montgomery	
9	Cassimus House	Cassimus House	August 13, 1976 (#76000349)	110 N. Jackson St. 32°22′43″N 86°17′47″W	Montgomery	
10	Centennial Hill Historic District	Centennial Hill Historic District	June 25, 2024 (#100010461)	Roughly bound by Highland and Adams Avenue to the north, Hall Street to the east, I-85 to the south, and South Bainbridge Street to the west 32°22′20″N 86°17′47″W	Montgomery	
11	City of St. Jude Historic District	City of St. Jude Historic District	June 18, 1990 (#90000916)	2048 W. Fairview Ave. 32°21′10″N 86°19′37″W	Montgomery	
12	Cleveland Court Apartments 620–638	Cleveland Court Apartments 620–638	October 29, 2001 (#01001167)	620-638 Cleveland Ct. 32°21′49″N 86°19′04″W	Montgomery	
13	Cloverdale Historic District	Cloverdale Historic District	September 12, 1985 (#85002161)	Roughly bounded by Norman Bridge and Cloverdale Rd., Fairview and Felder Aves. and Boultier St. 32°21′18″N 86°17′42″W	Montgomery	
14	Cottage Hill Historic District	Cottage Hill Historic District	November 7, 1976 (#76000350)	Roughly bounded by Goldthwaite, Bell, Holt, and Clayton Sts. 32°22′29″N 86°19′05″W	Montgomery	
15	Court Square Historic District	Court Square Historic District	March 1, 1982 (#82002062)	21-35 Court St., 1-2 Dexter Ave., 18-24 N. Court St., and Court Sq.; also roughly Dexter Ave. and Perry, Court, and Monroe Sts. 32°22′38″N 86°18′32″W	Montgomery	Second set of boundaries represents a boundary increase, the Court Square-Dexter Avenue Historic District Boundary Increase, listed on August 30, 1984
16	Court Square Urban Renewal Area Historic District	Court Square Urban Renewal Area Historic District	December 31, 2024 (#100011227)	Generally bounded by Madison Avenue, N. Lawrence Street, Church Street, and Lee Street; 32°22′39″N 86°18′30″W	Montgomery	
17	Jefferson Davis Hotel	Jefferson Davis Hotel	March 13, 1979 (#75000324)	Catoma and Montgomery Sts. 32°22′33″N 86°18′45″W	Montgomery	
18	Dexter Avenue Baptist Church	Dexter Avenue Baptist Church	July 1, 1974 (#74000431)	454 Dexter Ave. 32°22′38″N 86°18′10″W	Montgomery	
19	Dowe Historic District	Dowe Historic District	December 29, 1988 (#88003076)	320 and 334 Washington Ave. and 114-116 S. Hull St. 32°22′34″N 86°18′14″W	Montgomery	
20	Edgewood	Edgewood	April 24, 1973 (#73000367)	3175 Thomas Ave. 32°20′48″N 86°17′12″W	Montgomery	
21	First Baptist Church	First Baptist Church	June 25, 2024 (#100010460)	347 N. Ripley Street; 32°22′55″N 86°17′55″W	Montgomery	
22	First White House of the Confederacy	First White House of the Confederacy	June 25, 1974 (#74000432)	644 Washington Ave. 32°22′34″N 86°18′00″W	Montgomery	
23	Garden District	Garden District	September 13, 1984 (#84000698)	Roughly bounded by Norman Bridge Rd., Court St., and Jeff Davis and Fairview Aves. 32°21′29″N 86°18′19″W	Montgomery	
24	Gay House	Gay House	March 15, 1975 (#75000325)	230 Noble Ave. 32°21′46″N 86°18′17″W	Montgomery	Destroyed by fire in 2007.
25	Gerald-Dowdell House	Gerald-Dowdell House	April 28, 1980 (#80000729)	405 S. Hull St. 32°22′25″N 86°18′12″W	Montgomery	
26	Governor's Mansion	Governor's Mansion	July 3, 1972 (#72000172)	1142 S. Perry St. 32°21′43″N 86°18′27″W	Montgomery	
27	Grace Episcopal Church	Grace Episcopal Church	February 19, 1982 (#82002067)	906 Pike Rd. 32°21′18″N 86°05′51″W	Mount Meigs	
28	Grove Court Apartments	Grove Court Apartments	December 11, 2013 (#13000894)	559 S. Court St. 32°22′14″N 86°18′30″W	Montgomery	
29	Harrington Archaeological Site		January 25, 1979 (#79000394)	Address Restricted	Montgomery	
30	Huntingdon College Campus Historic District	Huntingdon College Campus Historic District	February 24, 2000 (#00000138)	1500 E. Fairview Ave. 32°20′59″N 86°17′06″W	Montgomery	
31	Jefferson Franklin Jackson House	Jefferson Franklin Jackson House	May 17, 1984 (#84000711)	409 S. Union St. 32°22′25″N 86°17′56″W	Montgomery	
32	Gov. Thomas G. Jones House	Gov. Thomas G. Jones House	December 8, 1978 (#78000506)	323 Adams Ave. 32°22′32″N 86°18′14″W	Montgomery	
33	Lower Commerce Street Historic District	Lower Commerce Street Historic District	March 29, 1979 (#79000395)	Roughly bounded by railroad tracks, Commerce, N. Court, and Bibb Sts.; also roughly bounded by railroad tracks, N. Court, Commerce, Coosa, and Tallapoosa Sts; also roughly bounded by the former Central of Georgia railroad tracks, N. Lawrence St., Madison Ave., and Commerce St. 32°22′49″N 86°18′38″W	Montgomery	Second and third sets of boundaries represent boundary increases of February 25, 1982 and January 15, 1987
34	Maxwell Air Force Base Senior Officers' Quarters Historic District	Maxwell Air Force Base Senior Officers' Quarters Historic District	March 2, 1988 (#87002177)	West Dr., N. Juniper and S. Juniper Sts., Inner Circle, Center Dr., Sequoia, and East Dr. at Maxwell Air Force Base; 32°22′51″N 86°20′24″W	Montgomery	
35	McBryde-Screws-Tyson House	McBryde-Screws-Tyson House	November 28, 1980 (#80000730)	433 Mildred St. 32°22′14″N 86°18′54″W	Montgomery	
36	Montgomery Greyhound Bus Station	Montgomery Greyhound Bus Station	May 16, 2011 (#11000298)	210 S. Court St. 32°22′29″N 86°18′33″W	Montgomery	Site of a clash between Freedom Riders and protesters in 1961. Today serves as a museum for the Civil Rights Movement.
37	Montgomery Union Station and Trainshed	Montgomery Union Station and Trainshed	July 24, 1973 (#73000368)	Water St. 32°22′50″N 86°18′51″W	Montgomery	
38	Montgomery Veterans Administration Hospital Historic District	Montgomery Veterans Administration Hospital Historic District	March 19, 2012 (#12000141)	215 Perry Hill Rd. 32°22′39″N 86°14′46″W	Montgomery	part of the United States Second Generation Veterans Hospitals Multiple Property Submission
39	Moore Building	Moore Building	July 17, 2024 (#100010582)	217 S. Court St. 32°22′29″N 86°18′32″W	Montgomery	
40	Mt. Zion AME Zion Church	Mt. Zion AME Zion Church	October 4, 2002 (#02001066)	467 Holt St. 32°22′06″N 86°19′14″W	Montgomery	
41	Muklassa		August 28, 1973 (#73000369)	Address Restricted	Montgomery	
42	The Murphy House	The Murphy House	March 24, 1972 (#72000173)	22 Bibb St. 32°22′48″N 86°18′35″W	Montgomery	
43	Old Ship African Methodist Episcopal Zion Church	Old Ship African Methodist Episcopal Zion Church	January 24, 1991 (#90002177)	483 Holcombe St. 32°22′17″N 86°18′42″W	Montgomery	
44	Opp Cottage	Opp Cottage	May 4, 1976 (#76000351)	33 W. Jefferson Davis Ave. 32°21′58″N 86°18′36″W	Montgomery	
45	Ordeman-Shaw Historic District	Ordeman-Shaw Historic District	May 13, 1971 (#71000105)	Bounded by McDonough, Decatur, Madison, and Randolph Sts. 32°22′54″N 86°18′14″W	Montgomery	
46	Pastorium, Dexter Avenue Baptist Church	Pastorium, Dexter Avenue Baptist Church	March 10, 1982 (#82002064)	309 S. Jackson St. 32°22′23″N 86°17′46″W	Montgomery	
47	Peacock Tract Historic District	Peacock Tract Historic District	December 1, 2025 (#100011302)	The district is generally bounded by Day Street to the north, Rosa L. Parks Avenue to the east, Early Street and I-65 to the southeast, Mill Street to the southwest, and Oak Street to the west 32°21′47″N 86°19′16″W	Montgomery	
48	Pepperman House	Pepperman House	March 1, 1982 (#82002065)	17 Mildred St. 32°22′15″N 86°18′35″W	Montgomery	
49	Perry Street Historic District	Perry Street Historic District	December 16, 1971 (#71000106)	Roughly bounded by McDonough St. on the east, Sayre St. on the west, Washington St. on the north, and Donaldson St. on the south 32°22′26″N 86°18′27″W	Montgomery	
50	Powder Magazine	Powder Magazine	April 13, 1973 (#73000370)	End of Eugene St. 32°22′53″N 86°19′41″W	Montgomery	American Civil War-era building for gunpowder storage. Located in Powder Magazine Park, the building is currently under restoration.
51	St. John's Episcopal Church	St. John's Episcopal Church	February 24, 1975 (#75000326)	113 Madison Ave. 32°22′49″N 86°18′26″W	Montgomery	
52	Sayre Street School	Sayre Street School	February 19, 1982 (#82002066)	506 Sayre St. 32°22′15″N 86°18′39″W	Montgomery	
53	Scott Street Firehouse	Scott Street Firehouse	February 12, 1981 (#81000133)	418 Scott St. 32°22′25″N 86°18′11″W	Montgomery	
54	Semple House	Semple House	September 27, 1972 (#72000174)	S. Court & High Sts. 32°22′19″N 86°18′31″W	Montgomery	
55	Shepherd Building	Shepherd Building	May 22, 1986 (#86001106)	312 Montgomery St. 32°22′34″N 86°18′43″W	Montgomery	Demolished in 2010.
56	Jere Shine Site		December 8, 1978 (#78000507)	Address Restricted	Montgomery	
57	Smith-Joseph-Stratton House	Smith-Joseph-Stratton House	April 11, 1985 (#85000736)	302 Alabama St. 32°22′26″N 86°18′17″W	Montgomery	
58	South Perry Street Historic District	South Perry Street Historic District	August 30, 1984 (#84000713)	Roughly Perry St. between Washington St. and Dexter Ave. 32°22′36″N 86°18′27″W	Montgomery	
59	Stay House	Stay House	September 10, 1979 (#79000396)	631 S. Hull St; 32°22′10″N 86°18′11″W	Montgomery	
60	Steiner-Lobman and Teague Hardware Buildings	Steiner-Lobman and Teague Hardware Buildings	January 31, 1979 (#79000397)	184 and 172 Commerce St. 32°22′49″N 86°18′41″W	Montgomery	
61	Stone Plantation	Stone Plantation	December 31, 2001 (#01001411)	5001 Old Selma Rd. 32°21′02″N 86°25′31″W	Montgomery	
62	Tankersley Rosenwald School	Tankersley Rosenwald School	January 22, 2009 (#08001332)	10 miles (16 km) south of Montgomery on U.S. Route 31 to Pettus Rd. to School Spur on the western side 32°08′32″N 86°21′25″W	Hope Hull	
63	Dr. C.A. Thigpen House	Dr. C.A. Thigpen House	December 13, 1977 (#77000215)	1412 S. Perry St. 32°21′33″N 86°18′26″W	Montgomery	
64	Tulane Building	Tulane Building	March 21, 1979 (#79000398)	800 High St. 32°22′19″N 86°17′52″W	Montgomery	
65	Tyson-Maner House	Tyson-Maner House	May 10, 1979 (#79000399)	469 S. McDonough St. 32°22′20″N 86°18′16″W	Montgomery	
66	United States Post Office and Courthouse-Montgomery	United States Post Office and Courthouse-Montgomery	June 3, 1998 (#98000611)	Church St. between Moulton and Lee Sts. 32°22′30″N 86°18′34″W	Montgomery	Many important civil rights cases heard and decided in this 1933 building
67	Wharton-Chappell House	Wharton-Chappell House	July 19, 2016 (#16000445)	1020 Maxwell Blvd. 32°22′40″N 86°19′43″W	Montgomery	
68	Winter Building	Winter Building	January 14, 1972 (#72000175)	2 Dexter Ave. 32°22′38″N 86°18′32″W	Montgomery	
69	Winter Place	Winter Place	May 31, 2006 (#06000439)	454 S. Goldthwaite St. 32°22′17″N 86°18′57″W	Montgomery	
70	William Lowndes Yancey Law Office	William Lowndes Yancey Law Office	November 7, 1973 (#73000371)	Washington and Perry Sts. 32°22′35″N 86°18′26″W	Montgomery	

== Former listings ==
	Name on the Register	Image	Date listed	Date removed	Location	City or town	Description
1	North Lawrence-Monroe Street Historic District		August 30, 1984 (#84000712)	October 6, 2011	132-148, 216, and 220 Monroe St. and 14, 22, 28-40, and 56 N. Lawrence St. 32°22′41″N 86°18′21″W	Montgomery	

== See also ==
- List of National Historic Landmarks in Alabama
- National Register of Historic Places listings in Alabama
