= Tyson House =

Tyson House may refer to:

in the United States

(sorted by state)

- McBryde-Screws-Tyson House, Montgomery, Alabama, listed on the National Register of Historic Places (NRHP) in Montgomery County
- Tyson-Maner House, Montgomery, Alabama, listed on the NRHP in Montgomery County
- Tyson House (Reno, Nevada), listed on the NRHP in Washoe County
- Gen. Lawrence D. Tyson House, Knoxville, Tennessee, listed on the NRHP in Knox County
