= Perry Street Historic District =

Perry Street Historic District may refer to:

- Perry Street Historic District (Montgomery, Alabama), listed on the NRHP in Alabama
- South Perry Street Historic District, Montgomery, AL, listed on the NRHP in Alabama
- Perry Street Historic District (Helena-West Helena, Arkansas), listed on the NRHP in Arkansas
