= Winter Building =

- U.S. National Register of Historic Places
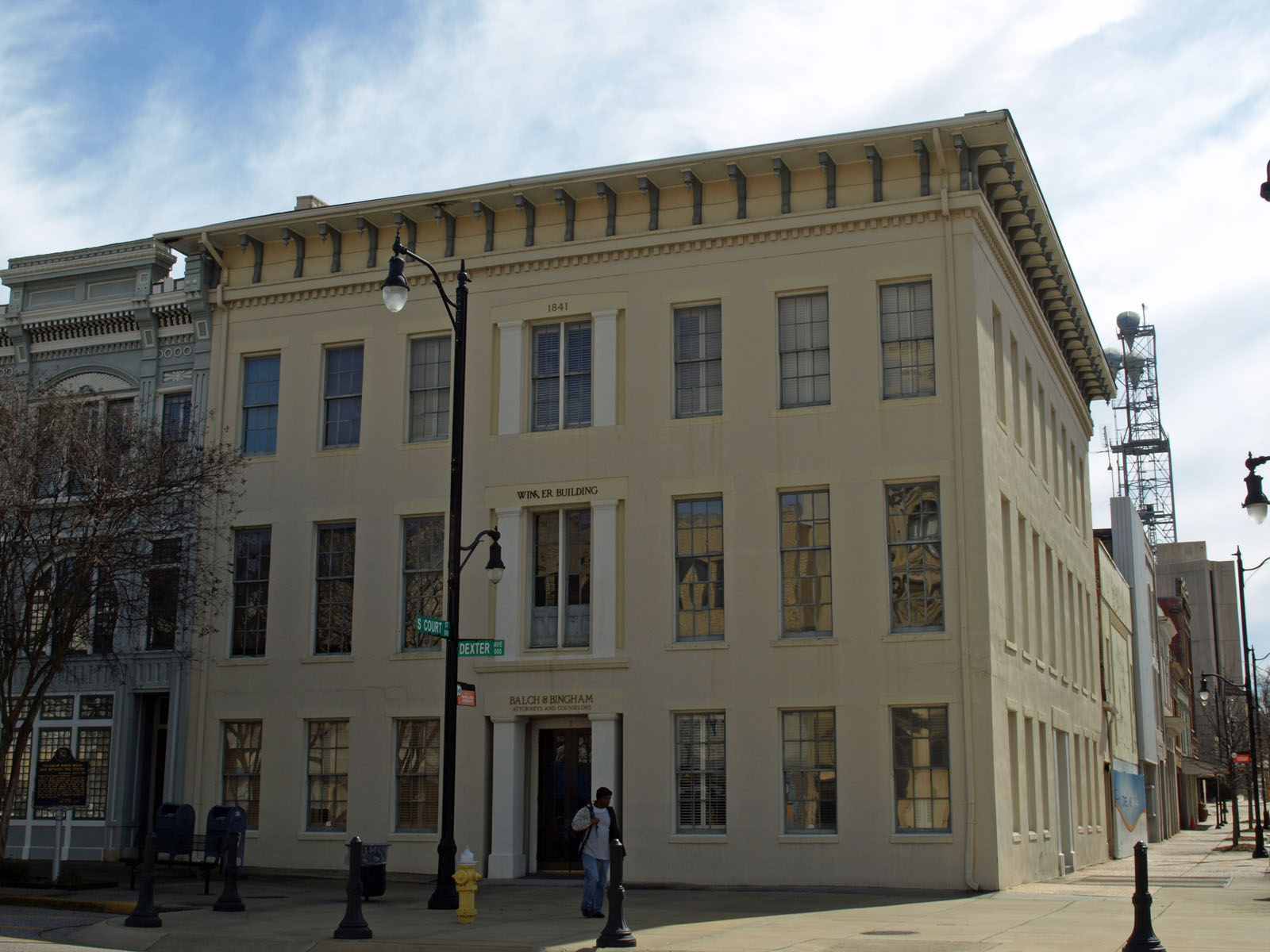
- The Winter Building in 2012

- Location within Alabama Location within the United States
- Location: 2 Dexter Avenue, Montgomery, Alabama
- Coordinates: 32°22′37″N 86°18′31″W
- Area: less than one acre
- Built: 1843
- Architectural style: Italianate
- NRHP reference No.: 72000175
- Added to NRHP: January 14, 1972

The Winter Building is a historic building in Montgomery, Alabama, U.S. The three-story structure was built as a bank branch with a telegraph office upstairs.

== History ==
The building was erected from 1841 to 1843 for John Gindrat, a cotton broker and banker. It was inherited by his daughter, Mary Elizabeth Gindrat, and her husband, Joseph S. Winter, in 1854.

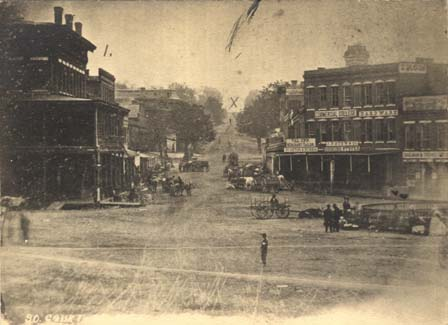
Photograph of Court Street in 1874 with Winter Building on left

During the American Civil War of 1861–1865, the second floor was home to the Southern Telegraph Company. It was there that LeRoy Pope Walker, the Confederate States Secretary of War, sent a telegram to General P. G. T. Beauregard to advise him to fire on Fort Sumter, and thus start the Battle of Fort Sumter.

It remained in the same family as late as the 1970s, when it was used for offices and a clothing store.

== Architectural significance ==
The building was designed in the Italianate architectural style. It has been listed on the National Register of Historic Places since January 14, 1972.
