= Ordeman-Shaw Historic District =

Historic district in Montgomery, Alabama

- U.S. National Register of Historic Places
- U.S. Historic district
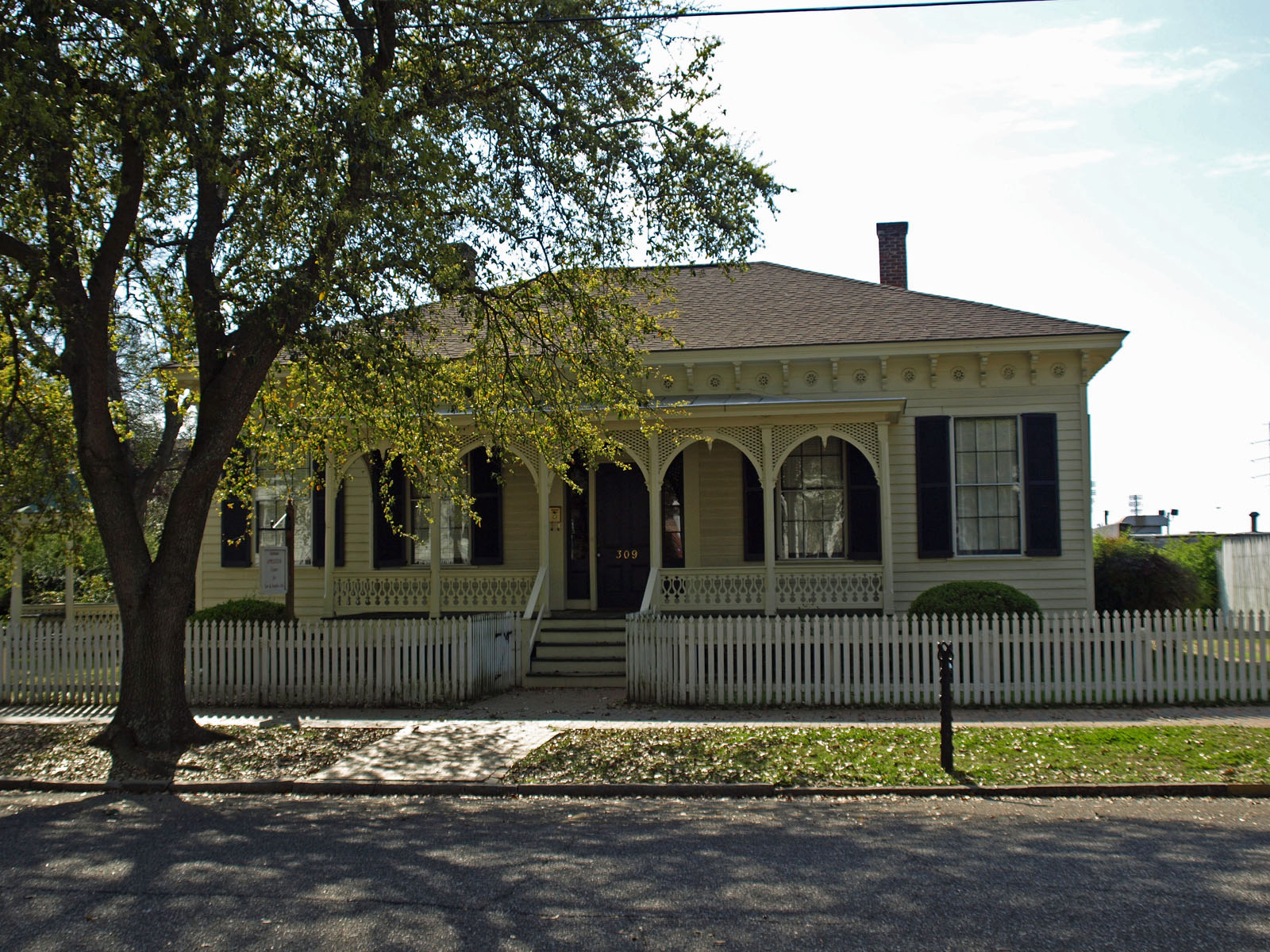
- The DeWolfe-Cooper Cottage in March 2009
- Interactive map of Ordeman-Shaw Historic District
- Location: Bounded by McDonough, Decatur, Madison, and Randolph Sts., Montgomery, Alabama
- Coordinates: 32°22′54″N 86°18′14″W
- Built: 1846
- NRHP reference No.: 71000105
- Added to NRHP: May 13, 1971

The Ordeman–Shaw Historic District is a historic district in Montgomery, Alabama. It is centered on the Ordeman–Shaw House, which construction started on as early as 1846 and was completed in 1850 by Charles Ordeman, a German immigrant architect. Ordeman was appointed city surveyor, and built a number of buildings in Montgomery, including the county courthouse. He used his profits to install gas lighting throughout the city, but overextended himself on the venture and left town by 1854.

The house is a two-story townhouse with a partially raised basement in Italianate style. Ordeman built a number of outbuildings, including a laundry-outhouse-storage building and a two-story slave quarters. The DeWolfe-Cooper Cottage (which was moved to its present site from near the Patrick Henry Brittan House three blocks away) was built in the early 1850s by Thomas DeWolfe, then-owner of the Montgomery Advertiser.

Much of the district was restored in the early 1970s, and is a part of Old Alabama Town, a museum showcasing city life in the 1850s. Many of the structures at Old Alabama Town were moved from other locations. The district was listed on the National Register of Historic Places in 1971.
