= First Baptist Church (South Perry Street, Montgomery, Alabama) =

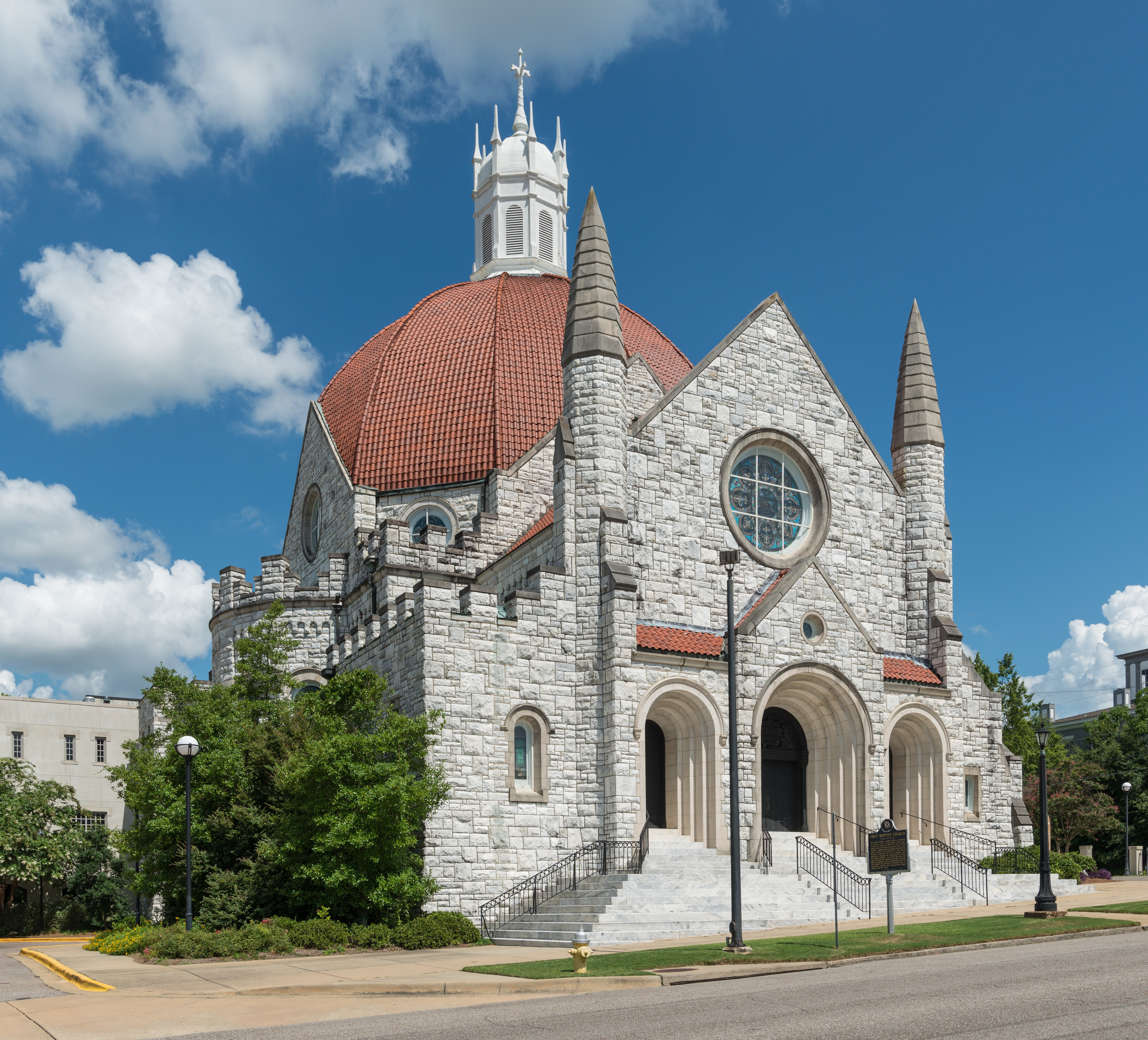
- First Baptist Church
- Location: South Perry Street, Montgomery, Alabama
- Country: United States
- Denomination: Southern Baptist Convention

Administration
- Division: Alabama Baptist Convention

The First Baptist Church is a Southern Baptist megachurch in Montgomery, Alabama. The First Baptist Church building is located downtown on South Perry Street. Founded in 1829, it had a mixed congregation (consisting of enslaved and free blacks as well as whites) until 1867 when most African-American members (themselves often the slaves of the white congregants) branched off to found their own church, initially called "First Baptist Church, colored" a few blocks away on Ripley Street.

== History ==
The church was founded in 1829 by Lee Compere, who had been sent out to do missionary work among the Creek Indians in Tallassee, east of Montgomery. Its first building was begun in 1932. it was a frame building about 60 feet by 40 feet with a recessed portico. The second building was constructed in 1854 to plans supplied by Thomas U. Walter in 1851. It was completed in 1854 and was 91 by 44 feet and served the congregation until 1908. The current building was constructed between 1905 and 1923 and is based on the Florence Cathedral.

In April 1965, by now an all-white church, in light of the ongoing struggle for civil rights, the pastor, J.R. White, and the church's deacons proposed an 'open door policy' to the First Baptist Church congregation. Although originally rejected, the proposal was subsequently accepted, and has been described as one of the first 'cracks in the segregated church.'. Dale Huff became pastor in 1980. In 1991, Jay Wolf become pastor of First Baptist for 29 years until he retired in 2020.

On September 30, 2021, an arsonist attempted to set fire to the main sanctuary, the historic Stakely sanctuary, as well as some other office spaces within the church. The reception office was destroyed and there were several burn spots on the carpet of both sanctuaries. Fire also damaged a few pews in the main sanctuary and smoke and soot were throughout the church.
