= Gerald–Dowdell House =

Historic house in Alabama, United States

- U.S. National Register of Historic Places
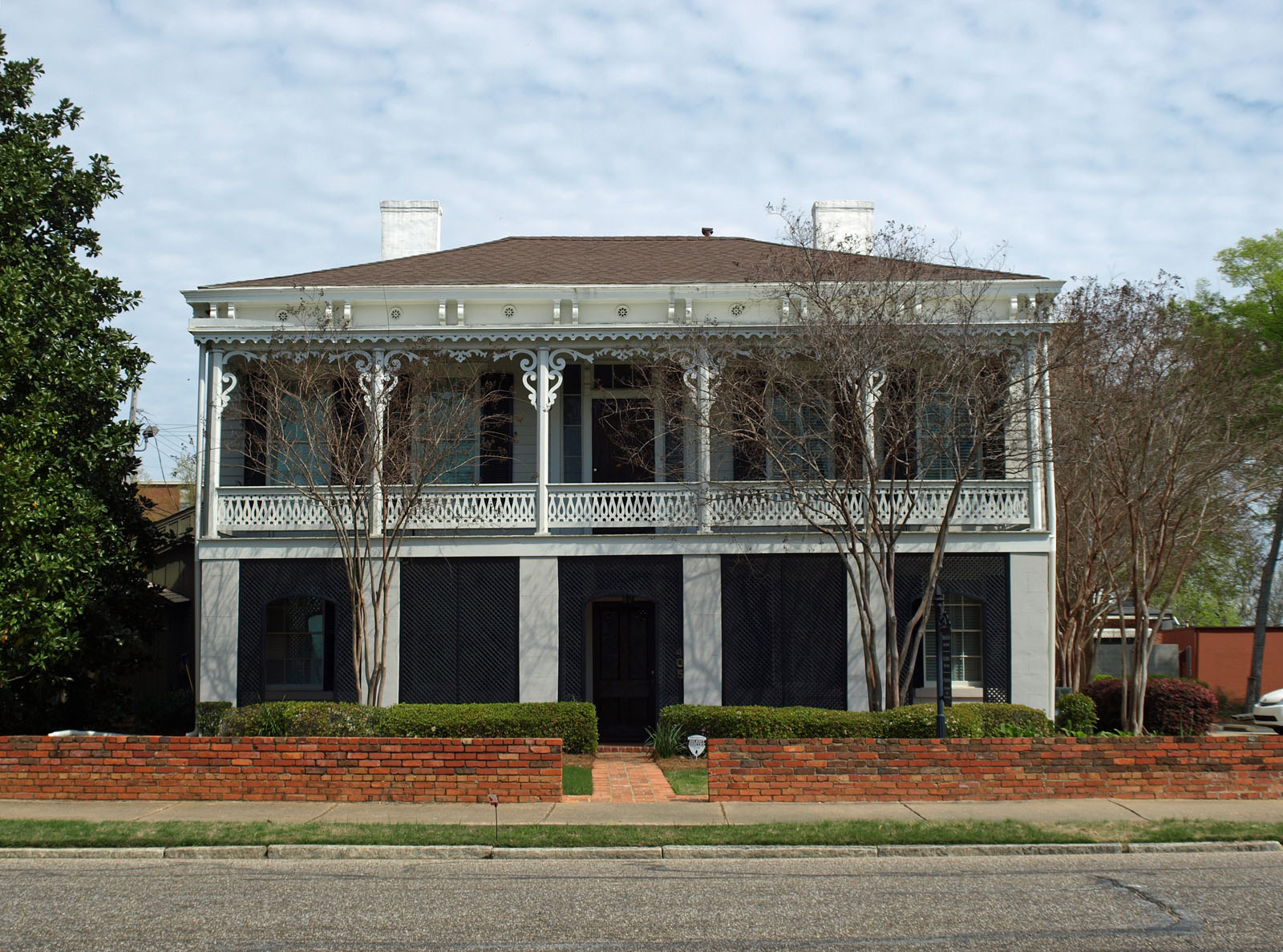
- The Gerald–Dowdell House in 2009

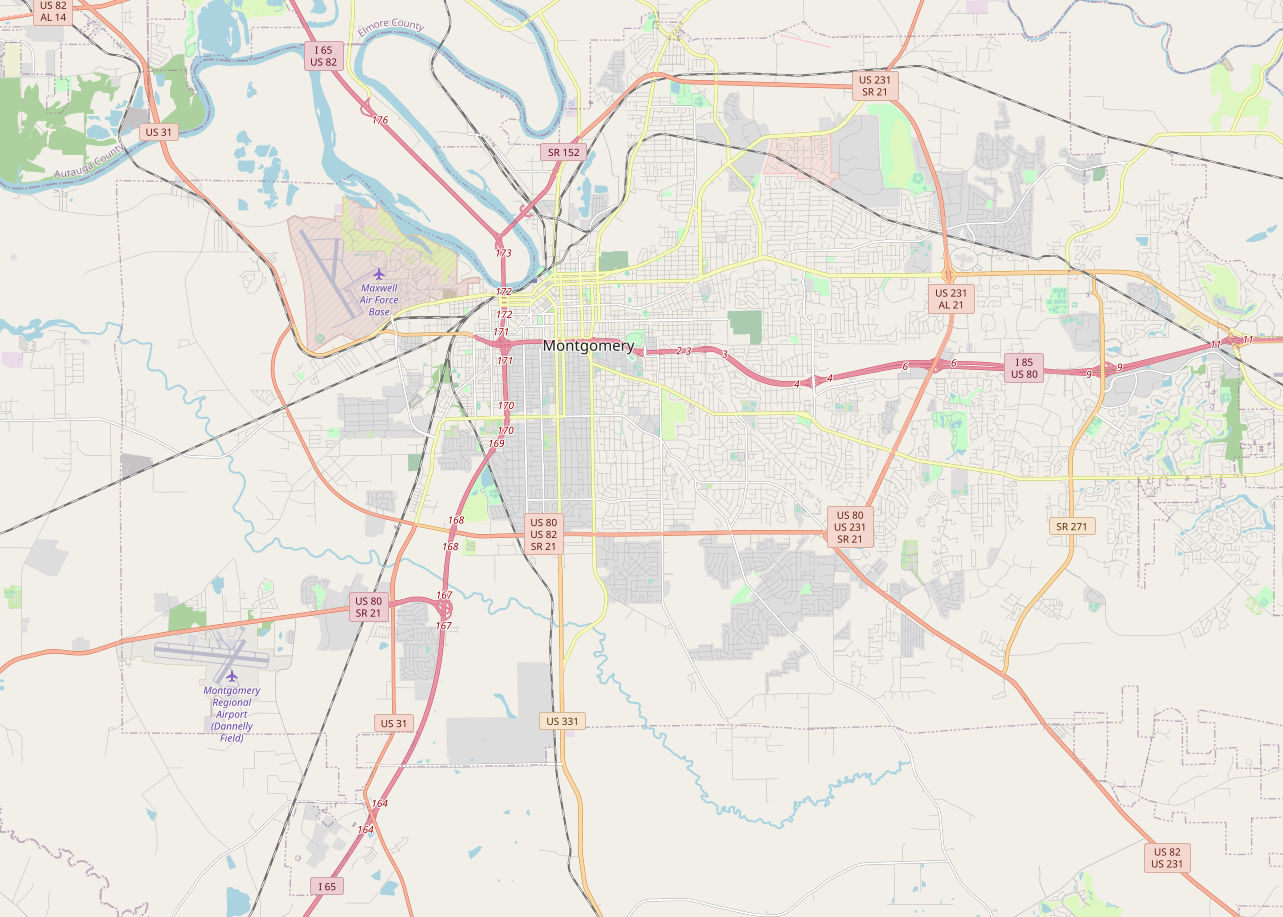
- Location within Montgomery, Alabama Location within Alabama Location within the United States
- Location: 405 S. Hull St., Montgomery, Alabama
- Coordinates: 32°22′25″N 86°18′12″W
- Area: less than one acre
- Built: 1854
- Architectural style: Italianate
- NRHP reference No.: 80000729
- Added to NRHP: April 28, 1980

The Gerald–Dowdell House, in Montgomery, Alabama, was built c.1854. It was listed on the National Register of Historic Places in 1980.

It was built by Perley and Camilla (Sanford) Buckley Gerald. Perley Gerald, a native of New York, moved to Alabama in 1829, first settling in Mobile before moving to the Montgomery area to trade with the Creek Indians. During the Gold Rush of 1849, Gerald went west and made a fortune trading with the miners. He later married Camilla Sanford Buckley, whose brother was General John Williams Sanford of Georgia and whose nephew was Colonel J.W.A. Sanford, Jr., who designed the State flag.

According to local tradition, Herman Arnold, conductor of the orchestra at the Montgomery Theater, was renting the front corner room of the house in 1861, at the outbreak of the Civil War. Arnold arranged “Dixie” as a march and led the Montgomery Brass Band in the inaugural parade. Another local inhabitant was Robert T. Simpson, a Justice of the Alabama Supreme Court who lived in the building from 1940 to 1949. The building is within walking distance of several key sites in the civil rights movement, including Dexter Avenue Baptist Church, where Dr. Martin Luther King once served as pastor.

The Gerald–Dowdell House is one of the few large raised cottages remaining in Montgomery, and has undergone substantial rehabilitation as part of its conversion for use as a law office for the firm of Wilkerson & Bryan, P.C. In 2000, construction was completed on a new building connected to the historic structure through what was once an enclosed back porch. The addition was designed to convey the image of a carriage house, in keeping with the historic nature of the site.

== See also ==
- National Register of Historic Places listings in Montgomery County, Alabama
