= North Lawrence–Monroe Street Historic District =

- Formerly listed on the U.S. National Register of Historic Places
- Former U.S. Historic district
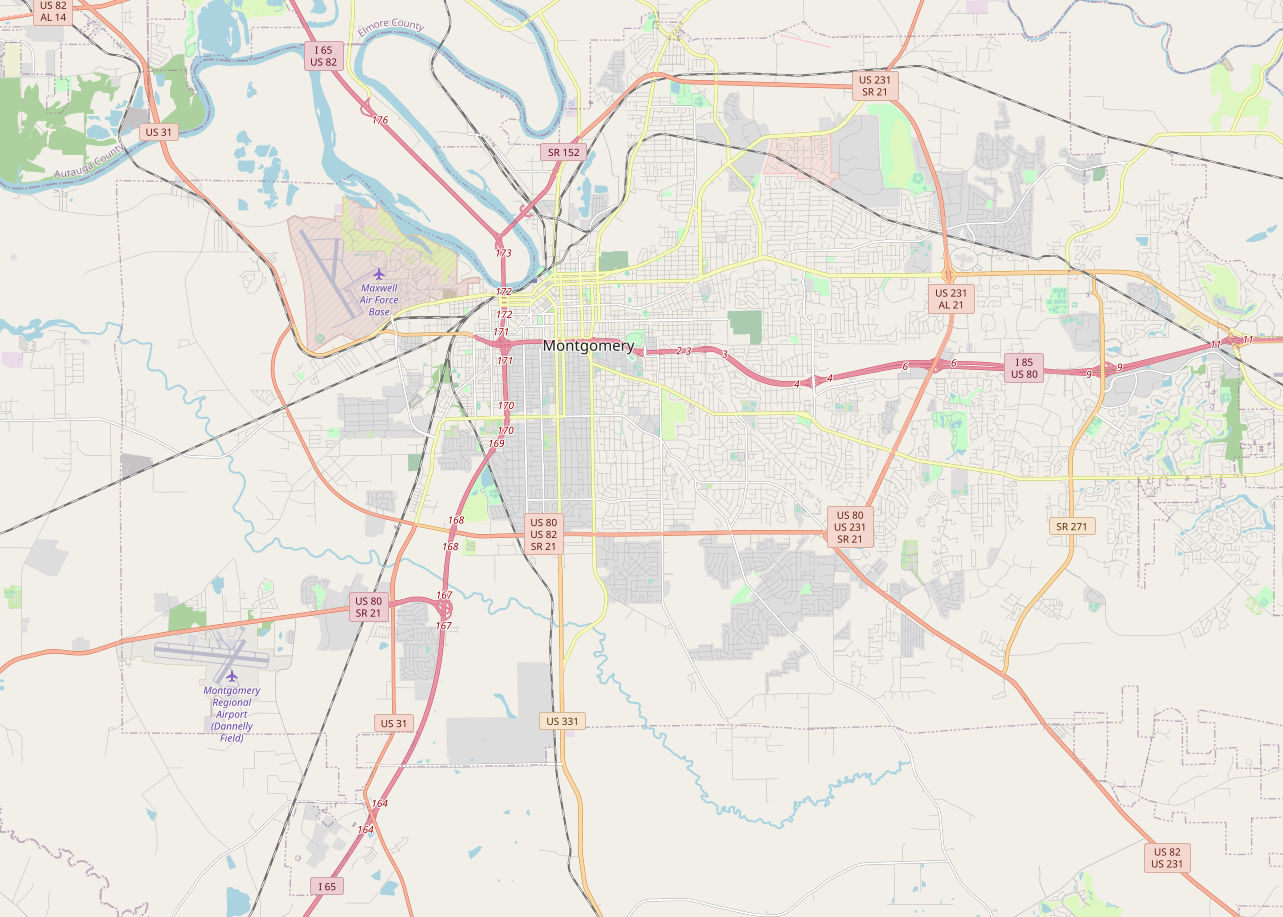
- Location within Montgomery, Alabama Location within Alabama Location within the United States
- Location: 132-148, 216, 220 Monroe St. and 14, 22, 28-40, 56 N. Lawrence St., Montgomery, Alabama
- Coordinates: 32°22′41″N 86°18′21″W
- Area: 2.8 acres (1.1 ha)
- NRHP reference No.: 84000712

Significant dates
- Added to NRHP: August 30, 1984
- Removed from NRHP: October 6, 2011

The North Lawrence–Monroe Street Historic District was a 2.8-acre (1.1 ha) historic district in Montgomery, Alabama. It comprised 132–148, 216, and 220 Monroe Street and 14, 22, 28–40, and 56 North Lawrence Street, containing a total of six contributing buildings. These buildings were significant in that they housed African American businesses during the era of segregation, making this a commercial center for African Americans in Montgomery. The businesses played a supporting role during the Montgomery bus boycott in 1955–1956 by providing dispatch and pick-up services. The district was placed on the National Register of Historic Places on August 30, 1984. The entire block was subsequently demolished in the mid-1990s to allow construction of a parking deck for the RSA Tower.

== See also ==
- National Register of Historic Places listings in Montgomery County, Alabama
