= Tulane Building =

- U.S. National Register of Historic Places
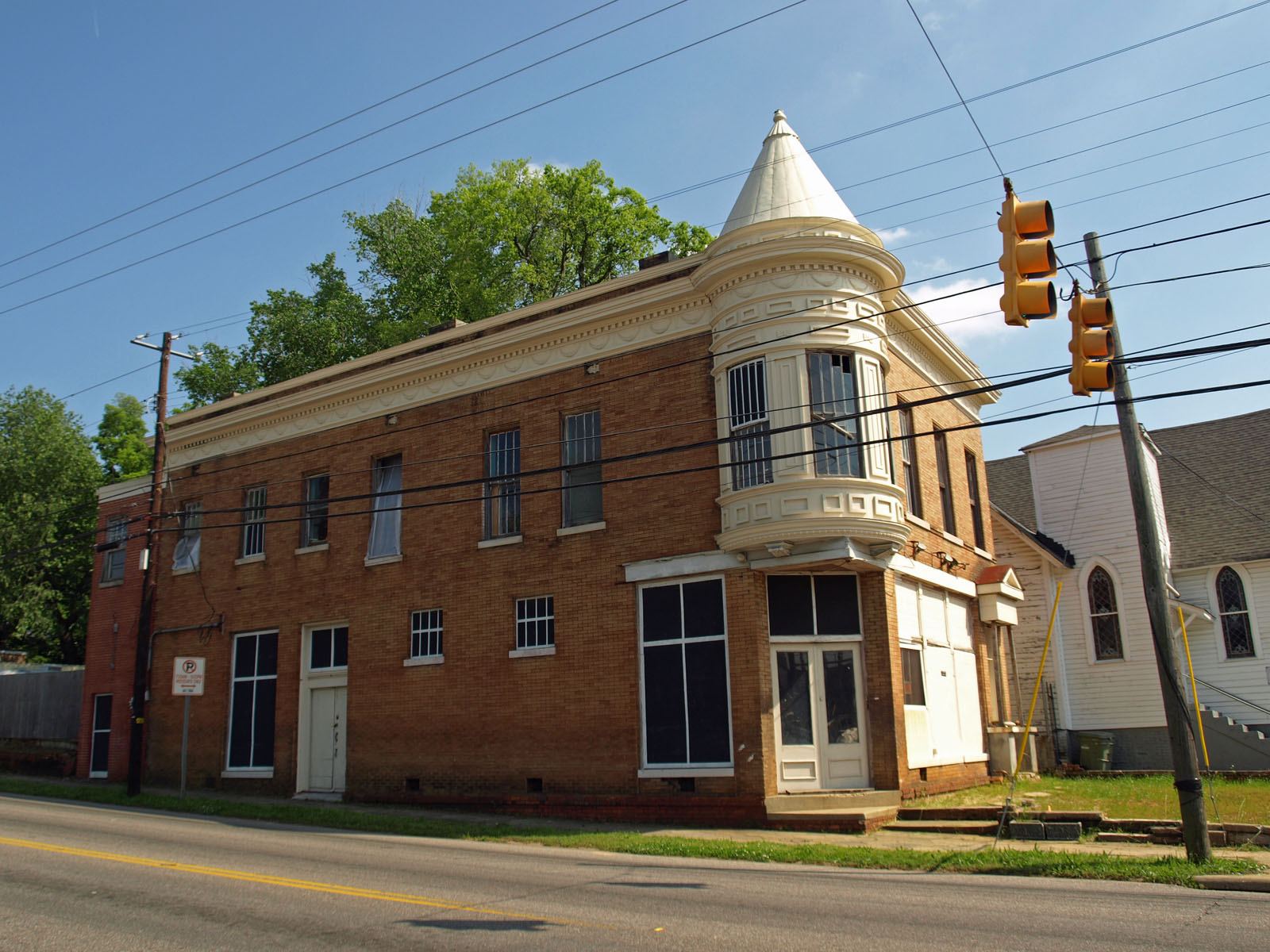
- The Tulane Building in 2009

- Location within Alabama Location within the United States
- Location: 800 High Street, Montgomery, Alabama
- Coordinates: 32°22′18″N 86°17′51″W
- Area: 0.2 acres (0.081 ha)
- Built: 1908
- Architectural style: Victorian Commercial
- NRHP reference No.: 79000398
- Added to NRHP: March 21, 1979

The Tulane Building is a historic building in Montgomery, Alabama, U.S. It was built from 1904 to 1908 by Victor Tulane, a black businessman who was a trustee of the Tuskegee Institute. Booker T. Washington visited the Tulane in the building in 1908. It has been listed on the National Register of Historic Places since March 21, 1979.
