= Muklassa =

Archaeological site in Alabama, United States

- U.S. National Register of Historic Places
- Location within Alabama Location within the United States
- Nearest city: Montgomery, Alabama
- Area: 52 acres (21 ha)
- NRHP reference No.: 73000369
- Added to NRHP: August 28, 1973

Muklassa, also known as Amooklasah Town, is the site of a former Upper Creek village in modern Montgomery County, Alabama. The site covers 52 acres (21 ha) and was added to the National Register of Historic Places on August 28, 1973.

== See also ==
- National Register of Historic Places listings in Montgomery County, Alabama
