= The Murphy House =

Historic house in Alabama, United States

- U.S. National Register of Historic Places
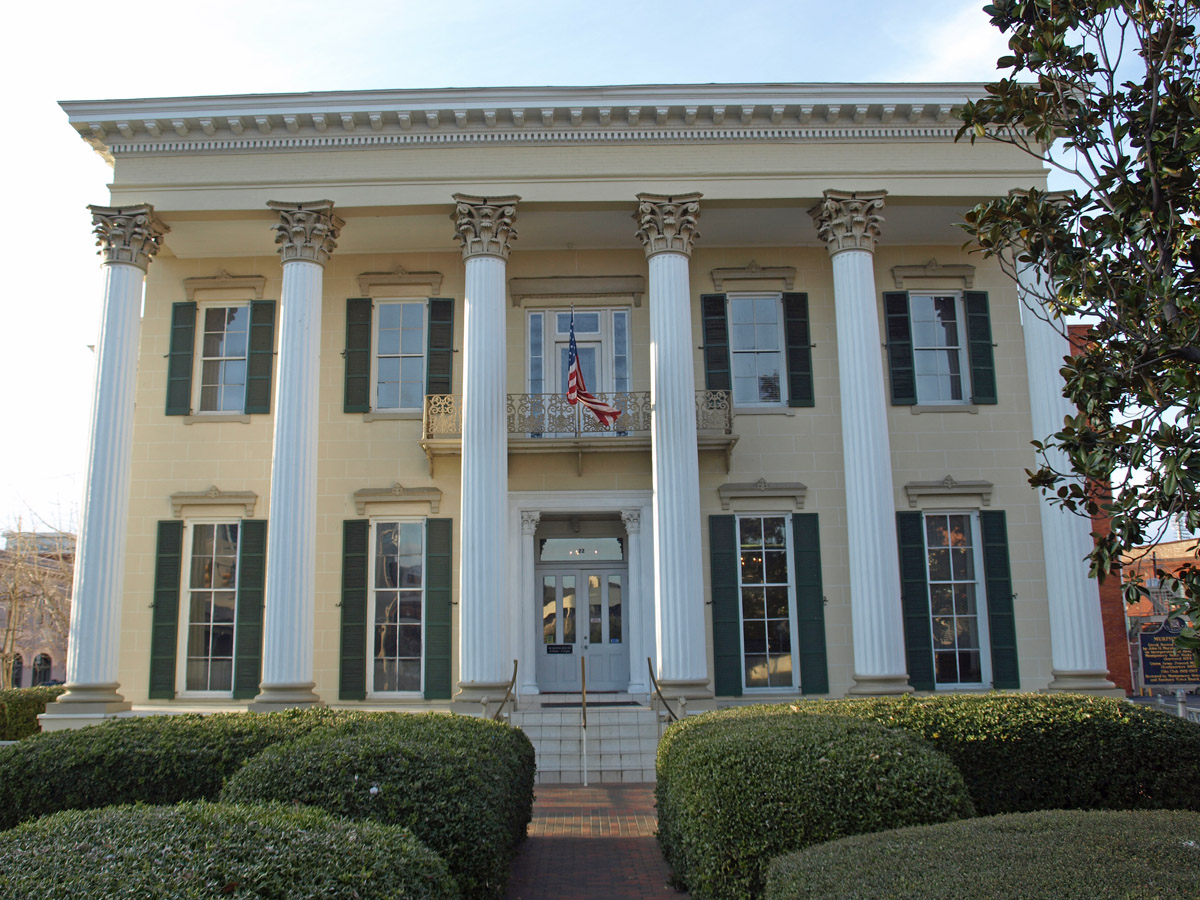
- The house in 2009

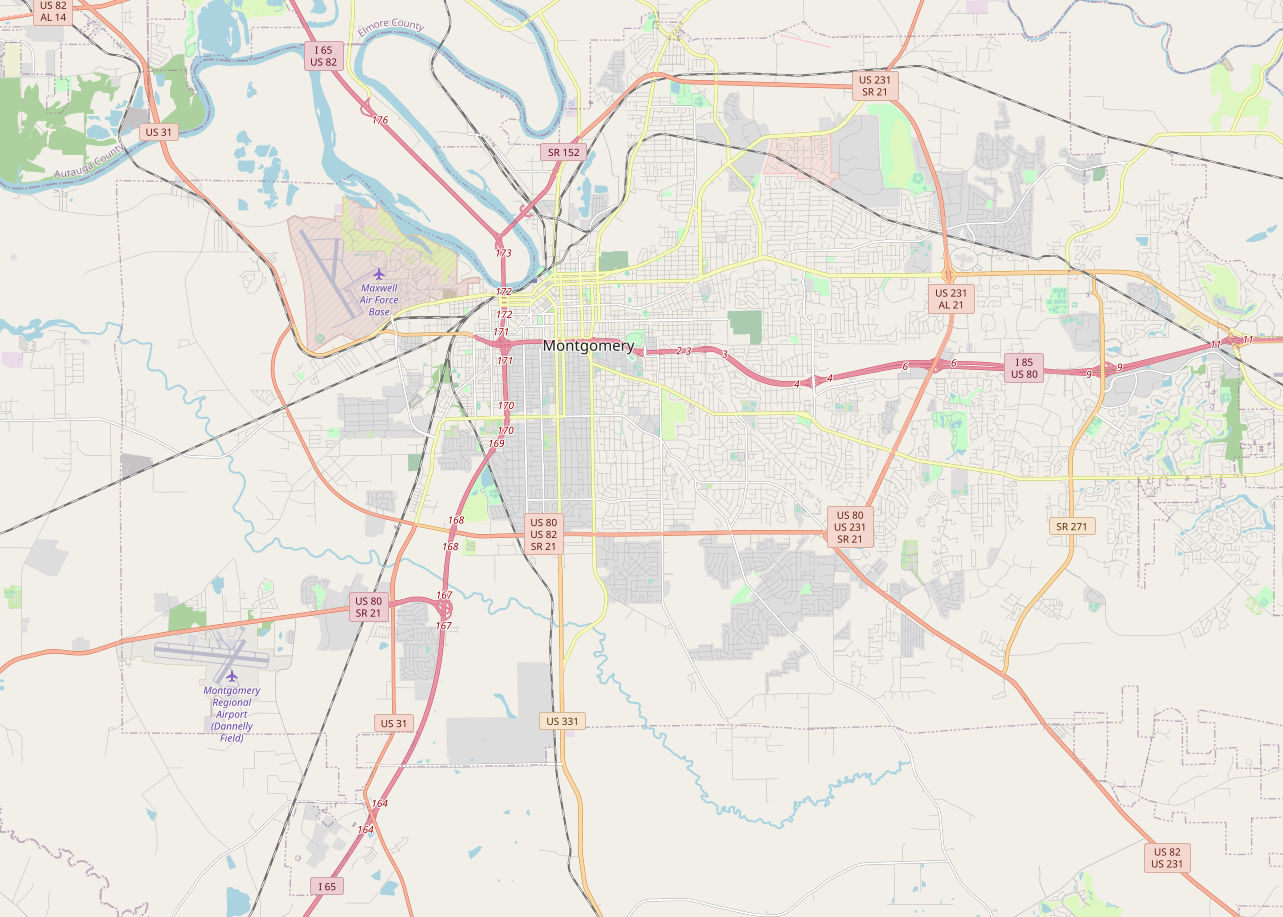
- Location within Montgomery, Alabama Location within Alabama Location within the United States
- Location: 22 Bibb St., Montgomery, Alabama
- Coordinates: 32°22′48″N 86°18′35″W
- Area: less than one acre
- Built: 1851
- Architect: John H. Murphy
- Architectural style: Greek Revival
- NRHP reference No.: 72000173
- Added to NRHP: March 24, 1972

The Murphy House is a historic Greek Revival style house in Montgomery, Alabama. The two-story masonry building was built for John H. Murphy, a Virginia cotton and slavery merchant who owned a large warehouse at 122 Commerce Street, Montgomery, where slave traders in the 1850s confined slaves until they could be sold at auctions. The house was added to the National Register of Historic Places on March 24, 1972.

== History ==
John H. Murphy moved his family to Montgomery and had completed this house by 1851. In 1854 the Montgomery Water Works Company was chartered, with Murphy serving as director. Murphy died in 1859, but his family stayed in the residence throughout the Civil War. Documented visitors during this period include Jefferson Davis and William Lowndes Yancey. The house became the headquarters of the Union Provost Marshal during the military occupation of Montgomery in 1865.

By 1894 the house was the home for the newly formed Beauvoir Club. In 1902 the Elks social club bought the house to use as their lodge; the Beauvoir Club in turn took over the Elks' club house, the Knox House, on the corner of Perry Street and Scott Street. The Elks maintained the house until 1967 when they went bankrupt and the house was foreclosed on; it was sold at public auction. In 1970 the Montgomery Water Works and Sanitary Sewer Board purchased and restored the house to serve as their offices. It has remained in the board's possession to the present day.

== See also ==
- National Register of Historic Places listings in Montgomery County, Alabama
