= Perry Street Historic District (Montgomery, Alabama) =

Historic district in Montgomery, Alabama

- U.S. National Register of Historic Places
- U.S. Historic district
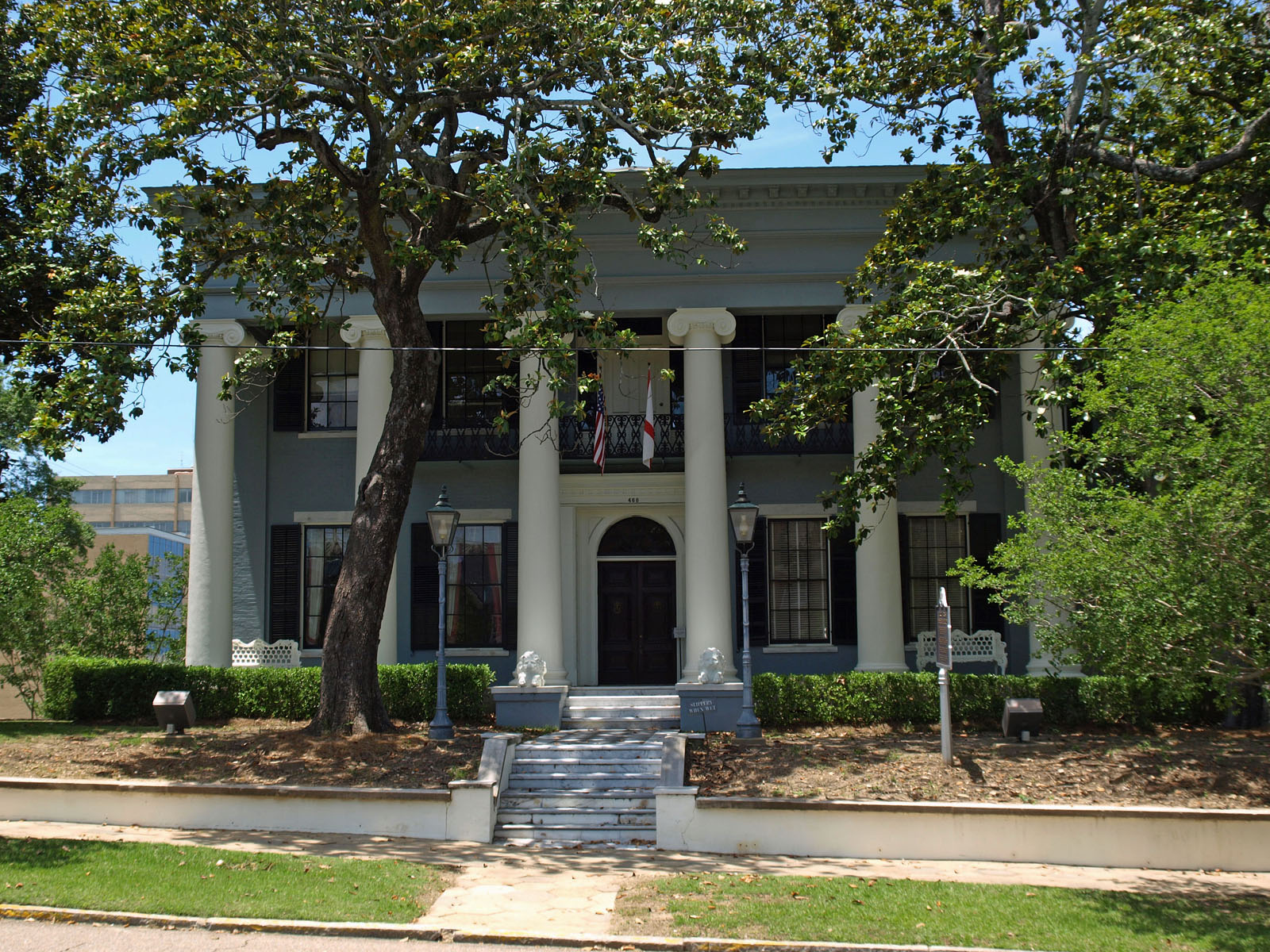
- The Teague House in May 2009
- Interactive map of Perry Street Historic District
- Location: Roughly bounded by McDonough St. on the east, Sayre St. on the west, Washington St. on the north, and Donaldson St. on the south, Montgomery, Alabama
- Coordinates: 32°22′26″N 86°18′27″W
- NRHP reference No.: 71000106
- Added to NRHP: December 16, 1971

The Perry Street Historic District is a historic district in Montgomery, Alabama. Covering approximately 170 acres (69 ha) in the southern portion of downtown, the district originally developed as a residential area. Included are several well-preserved antebellum structures, including the Greek Revival Teague House and Lomax House, the Federal/Greek Revival Cody House, the Dutch Colonial Hannon-Washburne House, the Italianate Greil Mansion, and the Spanish Mission style St. Peter's Catholic Church. Also notable are the Beaux-Arts Carnegie library, several Victorian houses (such as the Pepperman House), the International Style Grove Court Apartments, and the Gothic Revival First Baptist Church.

The district was listed on the National Register of Historic Places in 1971.
