= Harrington Archaeological Site =

Archaeological site in Alabama, United States

- U.S. National Register of Historic Places
- Nearest city: Montgomery, Alabama
- Area: 5 acres (2.0 ha)
- NRHP reference No.: 79000394
- Added to NRHP: January 25, 1979

The Harrington Archaeological Site, also known as the Alabama Archaeological Survey 1 Mt 231, is the site of a Native American settlement along Catoma Creek in modern Montgomery County, Alabama. The site contains numerous artifacts from the Calloway Phase of the Woodland period, including potsherds, bone tools, and plant and animal remains.

Material from two middens on the site were radiocarbon dated to around 175 CE and around 550 CE. The site covers 5 acres (2.0 ha) and was added to the National Register of Historic Places on January 25, 1979.
