= Powder Magazine (Montgomery, Alabama) =

Historic building in Montgomery, Alabama

- U.S. National Register of Historic Places
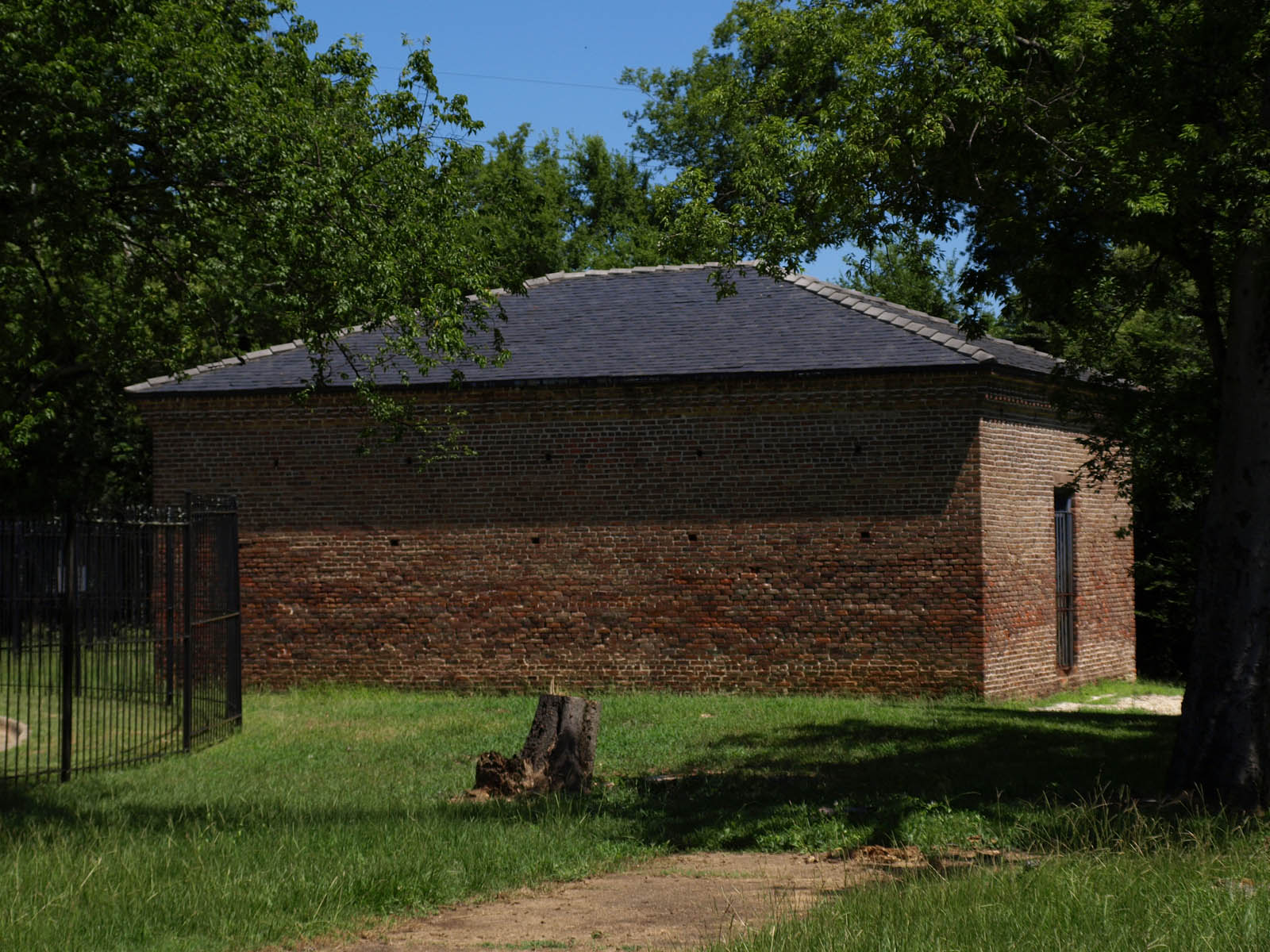
- The magazine in June 2009
- Interactive map of Powder Magazine
- Location: Eugene St., Montgomery, Alabama
- Coordinates: 32°22′53″N 86°19′41″W
- Built: 1861
- NRHP reference No.: 73000370
- Added to NRHP: April 13, 1973

The Powder Magazine is a historic building in Montgomery, Alabama. The gunpowder magazine was built in 1861 west of the city on a bluff overlooking the Alabama River. Gunpowder for the Confederate Army was stored there during the Civil War, and afterward it was used for general storage. A public park was proposed for the site as early as the 1970s, but the area lay empty until the opening of an artificial whitewater park in 2023.

The magazine is a one-story brick building with a pyramidal roof. The walls are 24 inches (61 cm) thick, and the entry door has an iron sill and iron bars. It was listed on the National Register of Historic Places in 1973.
