= Grove Court Apartments =

- U.S. National Register of Historic Places
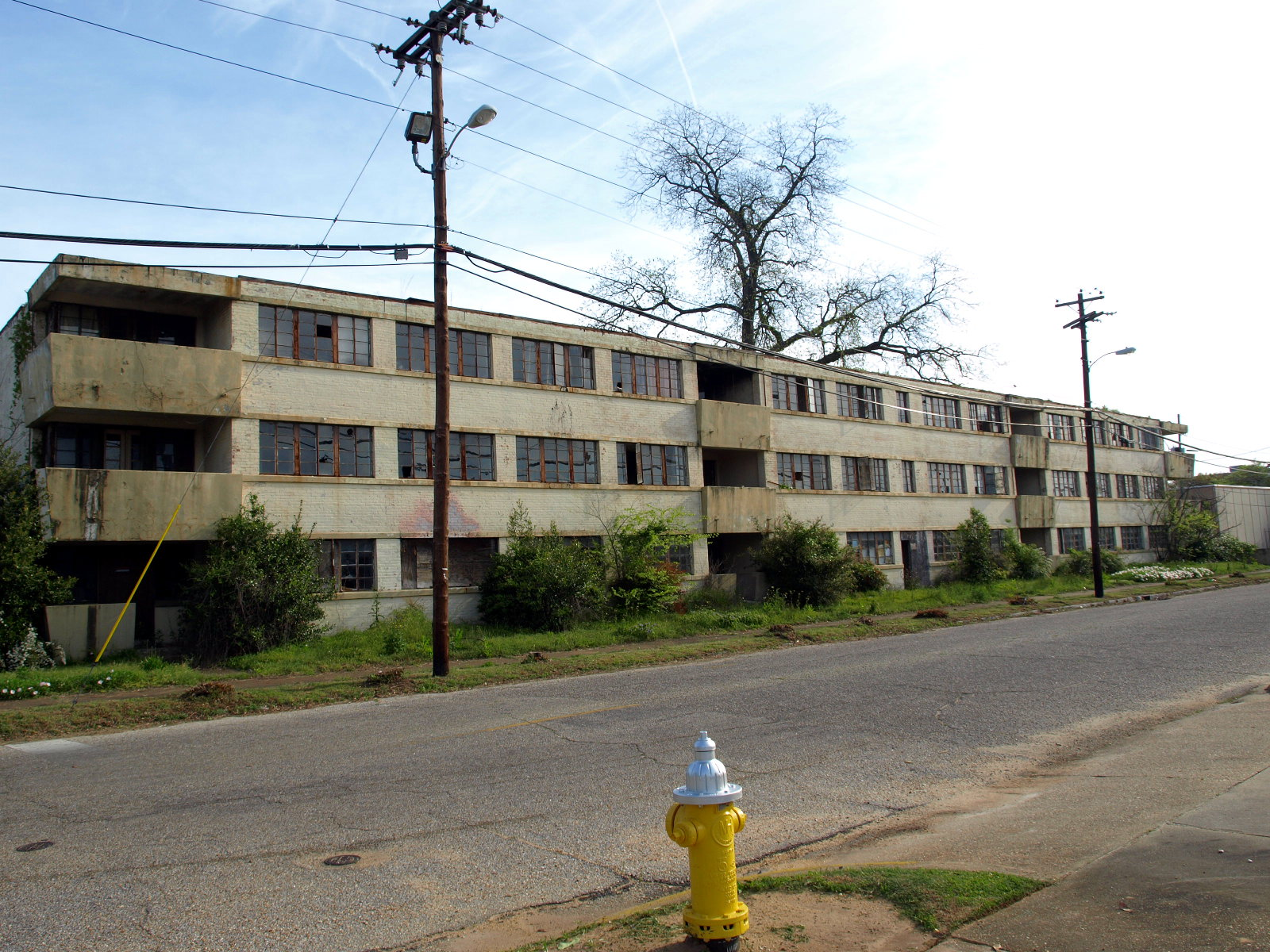
- The complex in 2014

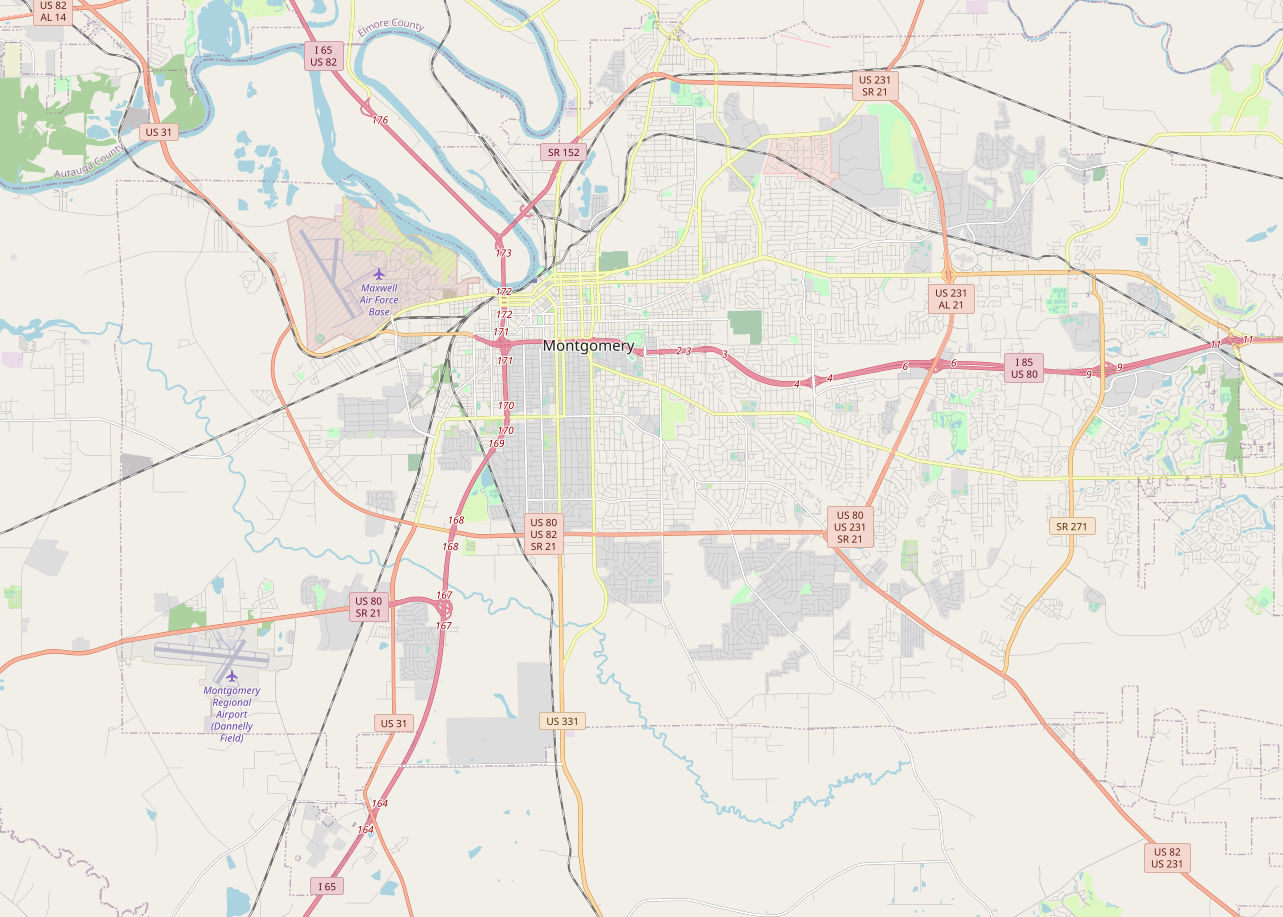
- Location within Montgomery, Alabama Location within Alabama Location within the United States
- Location: 559 S. Court St., Montgomery, Alabama
- Coordinates: 32°22′14″N 86°18′30″W
- Built: 1947
- Architectural style: International Style
- NRHP reference No.: 13000894
- Added to NRHP: December 11, 2013

The Grove Court Apartments in Montgomery, Alabama is an apartment complex built in 1947. Though it won an award for its design, it was abandoned in the 1990s and has been derelict since. Since 2013, it is listed as a historical site in the National Register of Historic Places listings in Montgomery County, Alabama.

== Location ==
The Grove Court Apartments are located at 559 South Court Street, previously owned by Newton Joseph Bell II. Bell was born in North Carolina in 1848. In 1851 his family moved to Alabama, where he grew up and farmed on the family plantation. He married Maria Ella Whitely and moved to Lowndes County. Bell then rented a farm in Lowndes County and opened a retail business. He later purchased one hundred and sixty acres of land. In 1881 he moved his family to the home he built on South Court Street, which would become the location of the Grove Court Apartments. Bell remained there until his death in 1910.

== Background and planning ==
After World War II and the Great Depression there was not enough housing to accommodate over ten million servicemen returning from the war. The government secured loans to reduce the housing crisis. The Federal Housing Agency guaranteed ninety percent of the loan if builders would agree to the Federal Housing Agency specifications.

After four houses were demolished on South Court Street, Carl W. Bear and Bear Brothers construction began building the Grove Court Apartments. In 1948 Carl W. Bear and Virginia O. Bear purchased Grove Court Apartments for $10.00 and other valuable goods. The builders agreed to work with the Federal Housing Agency to build Grove Court Apartments. The land was measured 211 by 287 feet. The apartment complex consisted of fifty-four one-bed room units and twenty-seven two-bedroom units, including parking on the street.

The Grove Court Apartments were designed by the Pearson, Tittle, and Narrow architectural firm in 1947 and built in the same year by the Bear Brothers construction company. The architectural style of Grove Court Apartments earned Clyde Pearson outstanding recognition in the field of design. Clyde Pearson was advanced to the highest class of membership in the American Institute of Architects. The Pearson, Tittle and Narrow architectural firm was nationally recognized in the Progressive Architecture magazine and the American Institute of Architecture magazine in 1947.

== Description and layout ==
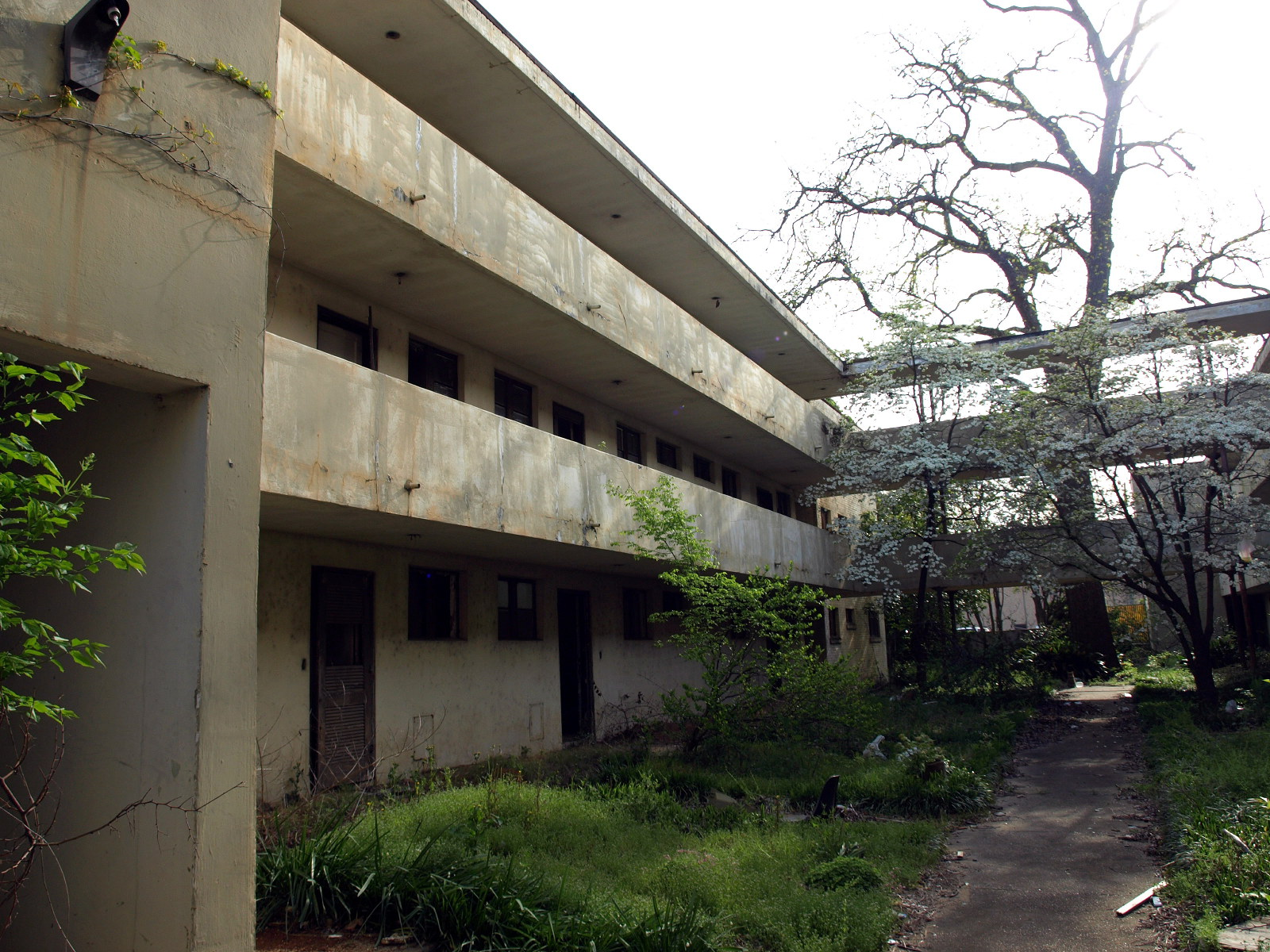
Grove Court Apartments

The units were accessible through the outside staircases. There were no inside staircases or shared hallways. The apartments were designed with an upstairs laundry room that employed an attendant. The building was designed with a flat top roof and an outside covered play area for children. The bedrooms were ten-by-twelve foot. The living rooms were twelve-by-seventeen-foot, and the dining rooms were eight-by-thirteen foot. The apartments were built with hollow tiles. The staircases and floors were made of concrete. The window frames were made of steel. The apartments were equipped with six-by-eight storage units in the basement.

The inside was painted white and the outside brick was painted gray and trimmed in green. The doors were burgundy and the windows were trimmed cream. After the war Grove Court Apartments became Montgomery's biggest construction project. Grove Court Apartments was considered a luxury apartment complex by post war standards. It was the residence of prominent citizens. Lawyers, doctors, and businessmen made Grove Court Apartments their home.

== 1970s-present: abandonment, current condition ==
Since the 1970s and the 1980s Grove Court Apartments has deteriorated. Five property owners that live near the apartment complex signed a letter stating that trash was in the abandoned building and people were living in the building. In 2013 Grove Court Apartments was placed on the National Register of Historic places. The Grove Court Apartments are currently on the market to be sold. The Abraham Brothers has owned the property since 1950.
