= Tyson–Maner House =

Historic house in Alabama, United States

- Tyson-Maner House
- U.S. National Register of Historic Places
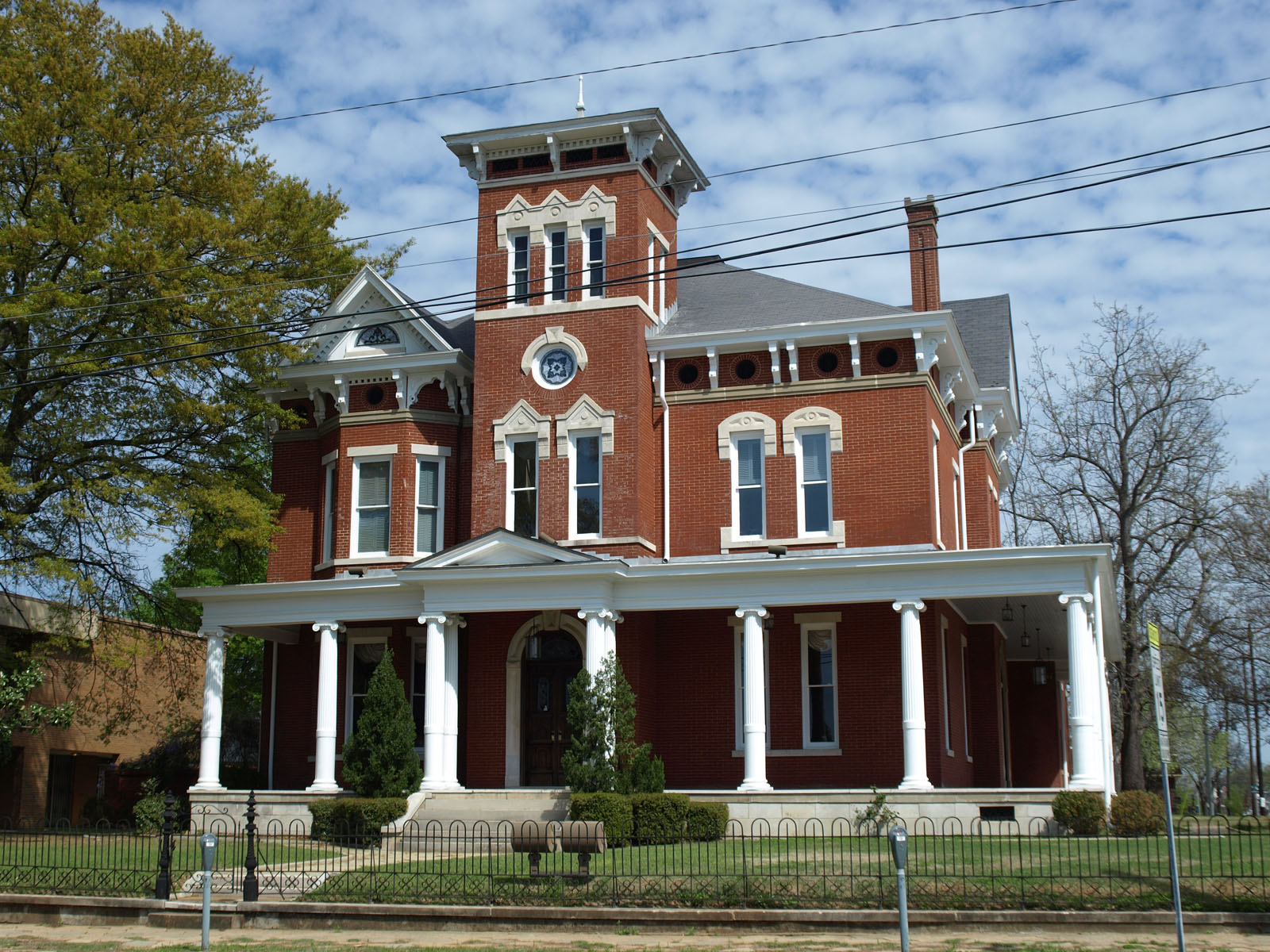
- The Tyson-Maner House in 2009

- Location within Alabama Location within the United States
- Location: 469 South McDonough Street, Montgomery, Alabama
- Coordinates: 32°21′47″N 86°18′16″W
- Area: 0.6 acres (0.24 ha)
- Built: 1890
- Architectural style: Late Victorian, Italian Villa
- NRHP reference No.: 79000399
- Added to NRHP: May 10, 1979

The Tyson–Maner House is a historic mansion in Montgomery, Alabama, U.S. It was built in 1890 for Archibald Pitt Tyson, a former farmer turned real estate developer. It remained in the family until 1930, as it was inherited by his wife Ellen Nicholson Arrington in 1918 and later by their children. By the 1970s, it belonged to Carl Herbert Lancaster, an architect. It has been listed on the National Register of Historic Places since May 10, 1979.
