= Simler Hall =

- Building 836--Holm Center
- U.S. National Register of Historic Places
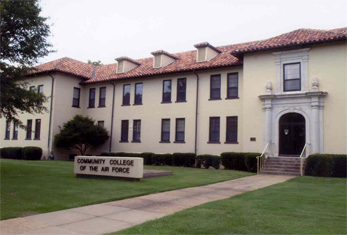

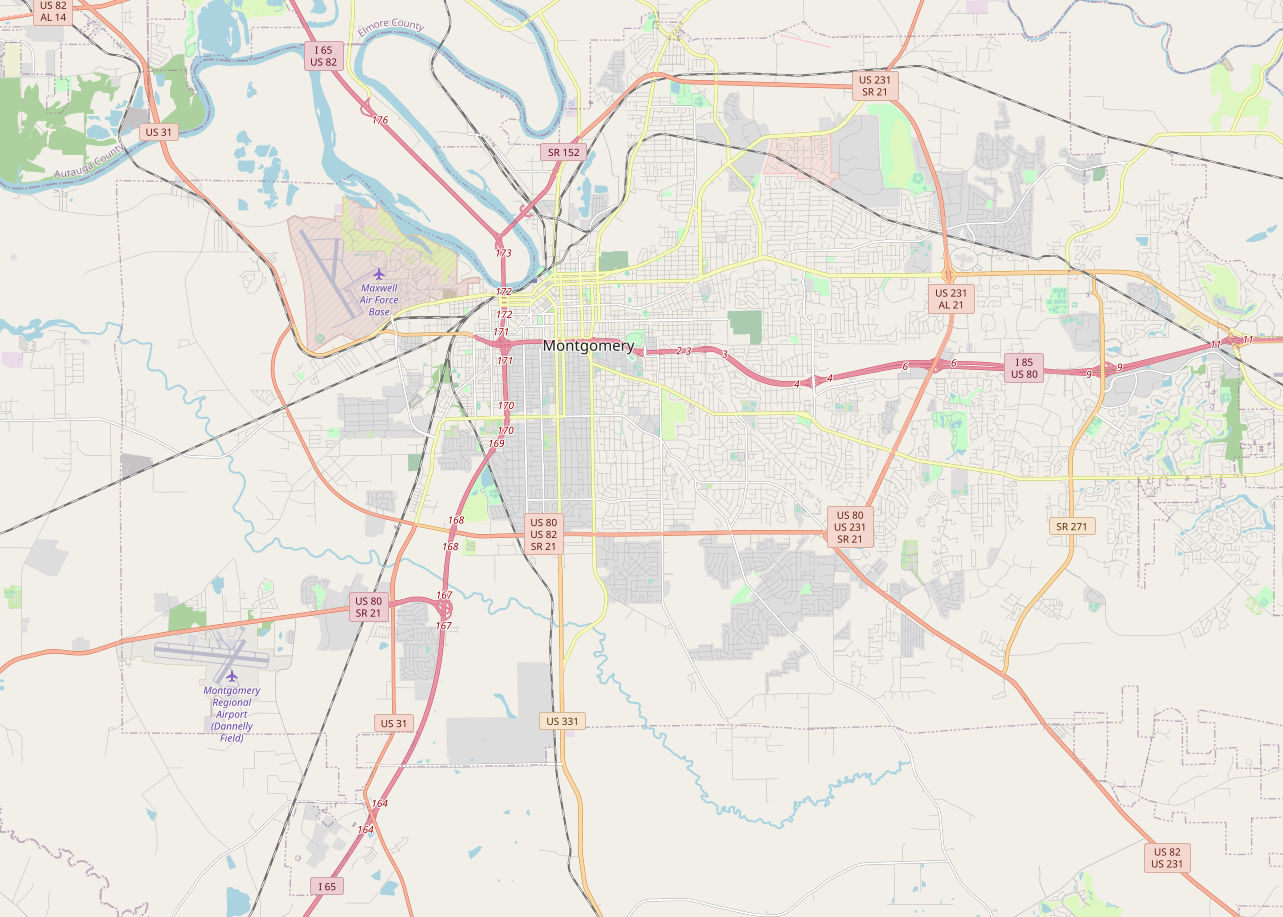
- Location within Montgomery, Alabama Location within Alabama Location within the United States
- Nearest city: Montgomery, Alabama
- Coordinates: 32°22′49″N 86°21′7″W
- Area: 1.4 acres (0.57 ha)
- Built: 1927
- Architect: US Army; Office of Constructing Quartermaster
- Architectural style: French Provincial
- NRHP reference No.: 87002182
- Added to NRHP: March 2, 1988

Simler Hall (also known as Building 836) is the oldest building on Maxwell Air Force Base in Montgomery, Alabama. Built in 1927, it now serves as the headquarters for the Holm Center. It is named for General George B. Simler, former commander of the Air Training Command. It was listed on the National Register of Historic Places in 1988.
