= Maxwell Air Force Base Senior Officers' Quarters Historic District =

Historic district in Alabama, United States

- U.S. National Register of Historic Places
- U.S. Historic district
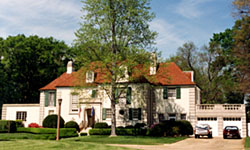

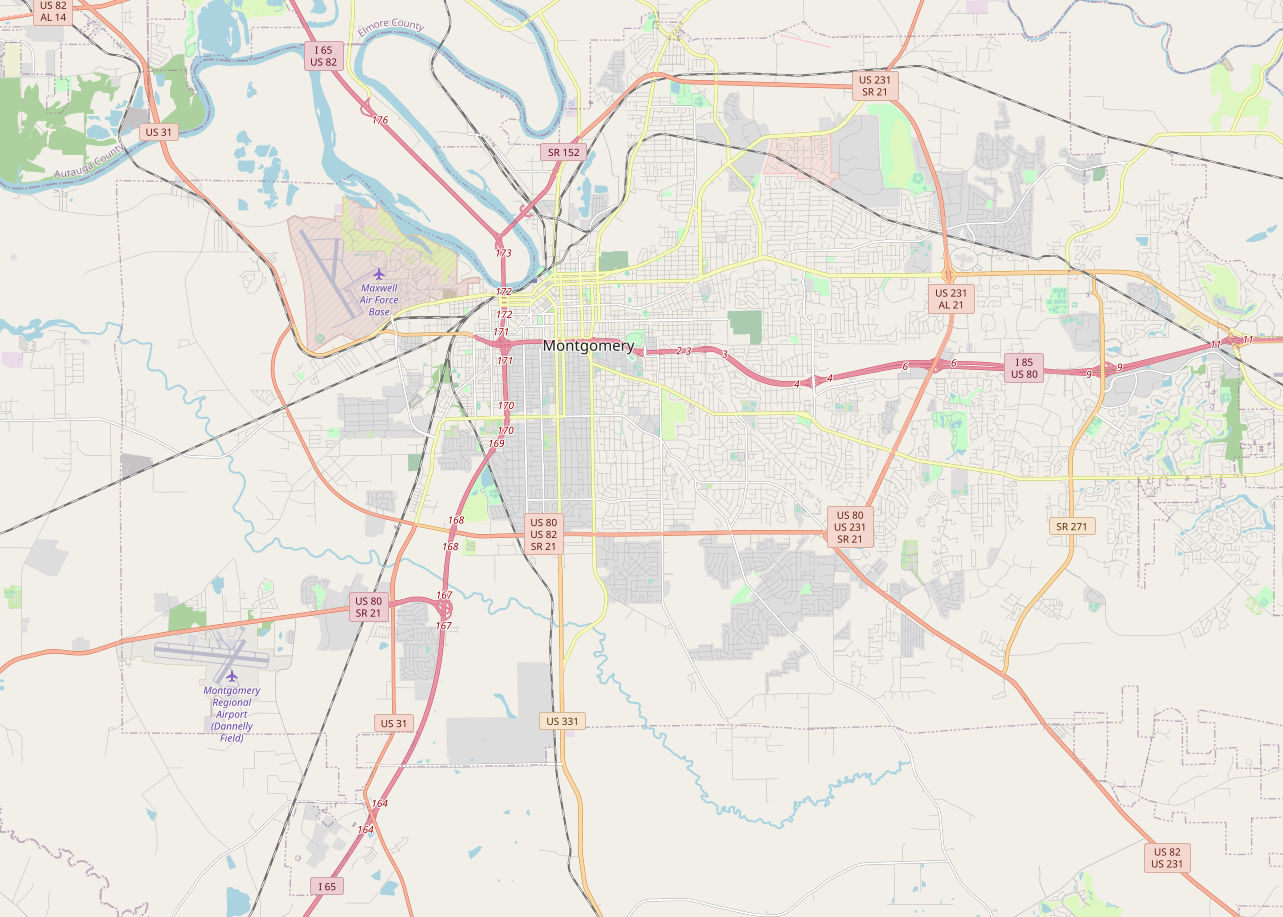
- Location within Montgomery, Alabama Location within Alabama Location within the United States
- Nearest city: Montgomery, Alabama
- Coordinates: 32°22′51″N 86°20′24″W
- Area: 81 acres (33 ha)
- Built: 1932
- Architect: US Army; Office of Constructing Quartermaster
- Architectural style: French Provincial
- NRHP reference No.: 87002177
- Added to NRHP: March 2, 1988

The Maxwell Air Force Base Senior Officer's Quarters Historic District is an 81-acre (33 ha) historic district on Maxwell Air Force Base in Montgomery, Alabama. It includes 150 contributing buildings, most of them houses for Air Force senior officers. They are built in the French Provincial architectural style and date to the 1930s. The district was placed on the National Register of Historic Places on March 2, 1988.
