= Cassimus House =

Historic house in Alabama, United States

- U.S. National Register of Historic Places
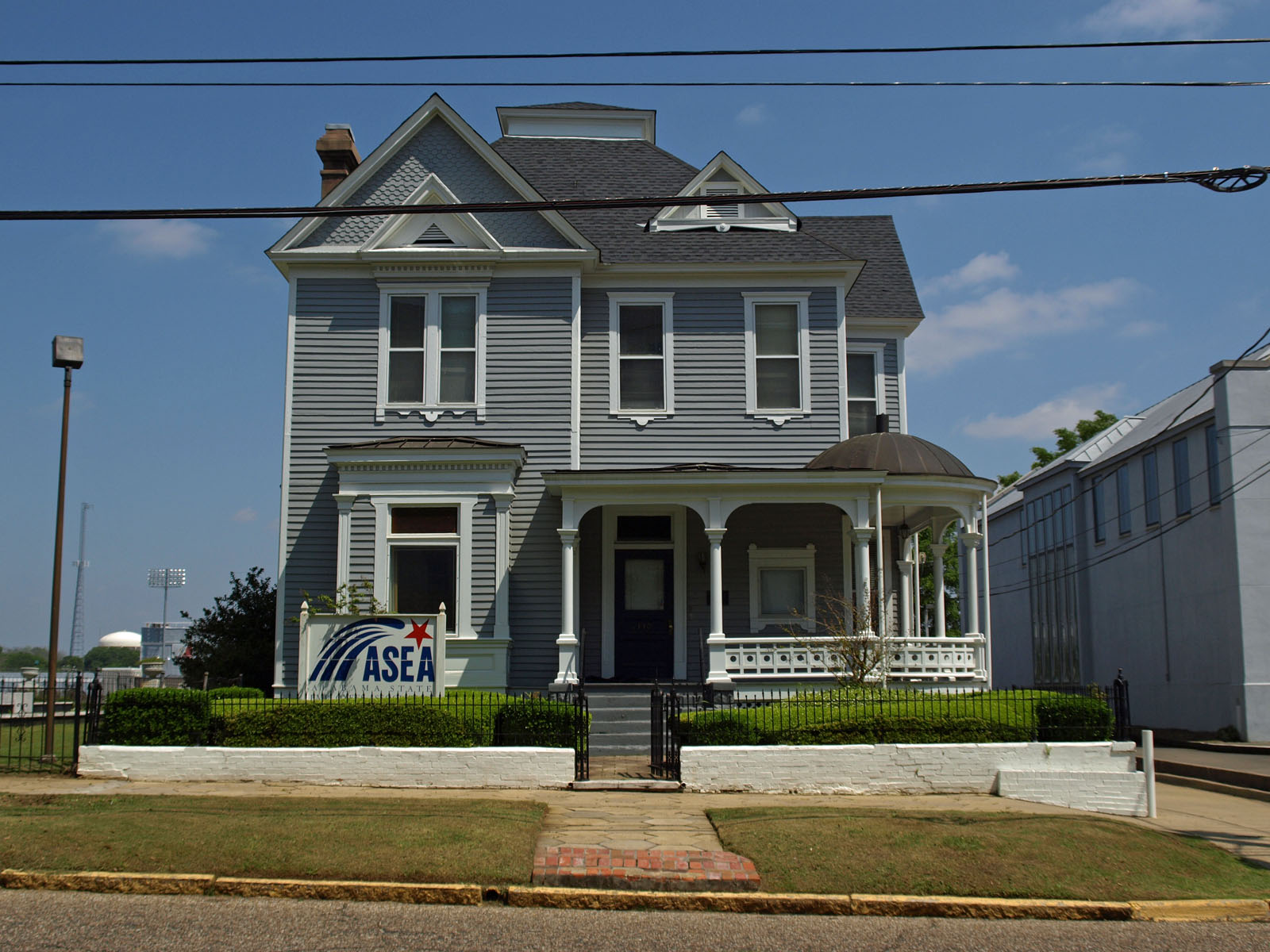
- The Cassimus House in 2009

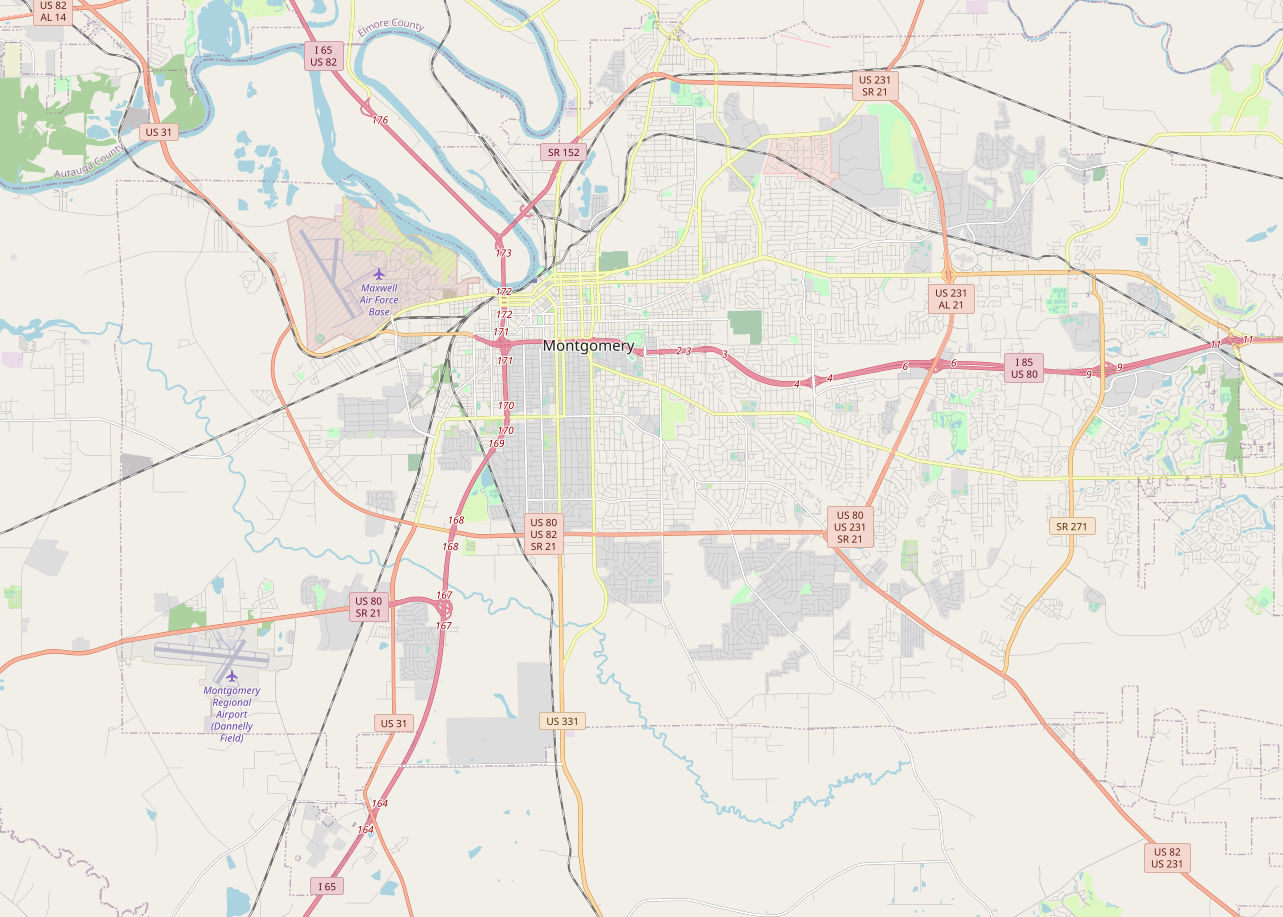
- Location within Montgomery, Alabama Location within Alabama Location within the United States
- Location: 110 N. Jackson St., Montgomery, Alabama
- Coordinates: 32°22′43″N 86°17′47″W
- Area: less than one acre
- Built: 1893
- Architectural style: Queen Anne
- NRHP reference No.: 76000349
- Added to NRHP: August 13, 1976

The Cassimus House (Greek: Οικία Κάσσιμους), is a historic Queen Anne style house at 110 North Jackson Street in Montgomery, Alabama. The two-story frame house was completed in 1893. It is the last residential structure remaining in its city block. It was added to the National Register of Historic Places on August 13, 1976.

== History ==
Cassimus House is one of the earliest landmarks associated with the Greek community of Alabama. Speridon Cassimus (Σπυρίδων Κασσίμης) from Othonoi, Greece built his home at 110 Jackson Street in 1893.

Speridon Cassimus came to the United States on December 28, 1888. Funds for his trip were provided by money saved by his father and brother, both named Alexander M. Cassimus. Alexander and his oldest son had arrived in Mobile, Alabama on October 23, 1873, where they had opened a fruit store. They moved to Memphis, Tennessee, where they lived until 1878 when they moved to Montgomery.

The older Cassimus, who resided with his son, Speridon, after the completion of the house in 1893, was the first Greek immigrant to settle in Montgomery where he was known as the "father of the Greek community" and was one of the first Greek immigrants in the state. Cassimus House is possibly the oldest remaining landmark associated with the early history of the Greeks in Alabama.
