= Smith-Joseph-Stratton House =

Historic house in Montgomery, Alabama

- U.S. National Register of Historic Places
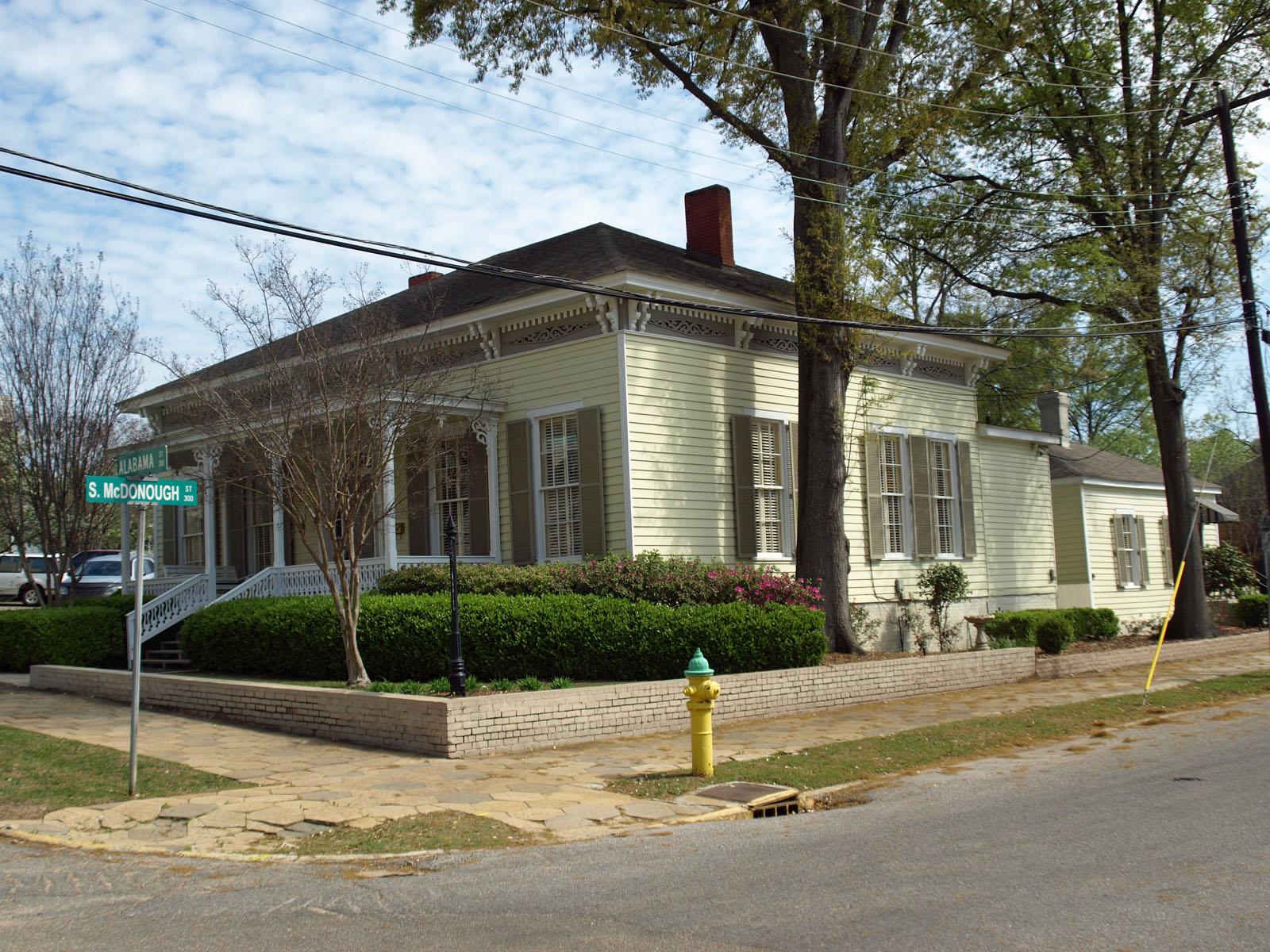
- The house in March 2009
- Interactive map of Smith-Joseph-Stratton House
- Location: 302 Alabama St., Montgomery, Alabama
- Built: 1855
- NRHP reference No.: 85000736
- Added to NRHP: April 11, 1985

The Smith-Joseph-Stratton House is a historic residence in Montgomery, Alabama. Built in 1855, the house was owned by E. B. Joseph from 1880 through 1885. Joseph was a businessman who was president of Montgomery's electric street car system, and served as mayor from 1900 to 1903. The house is a one-story Italianate cottage with a hipped roof. A porch covers the central three bays of the five-bay façade, and features elaborate brackets and railing. The bracketed cornice features dentil moulding and scrollwork on the fascia. A one-story servants' quarters is behind the house; originally oriented to the back yard, it was given an entrance on McDonough Street in the 1940s.

The house was listed on the National Register of Historic Places in 1985.
