= Patrick Henry Brittan House =

Historic house in Alabama, United States

- U.S. National Register of Historic Places
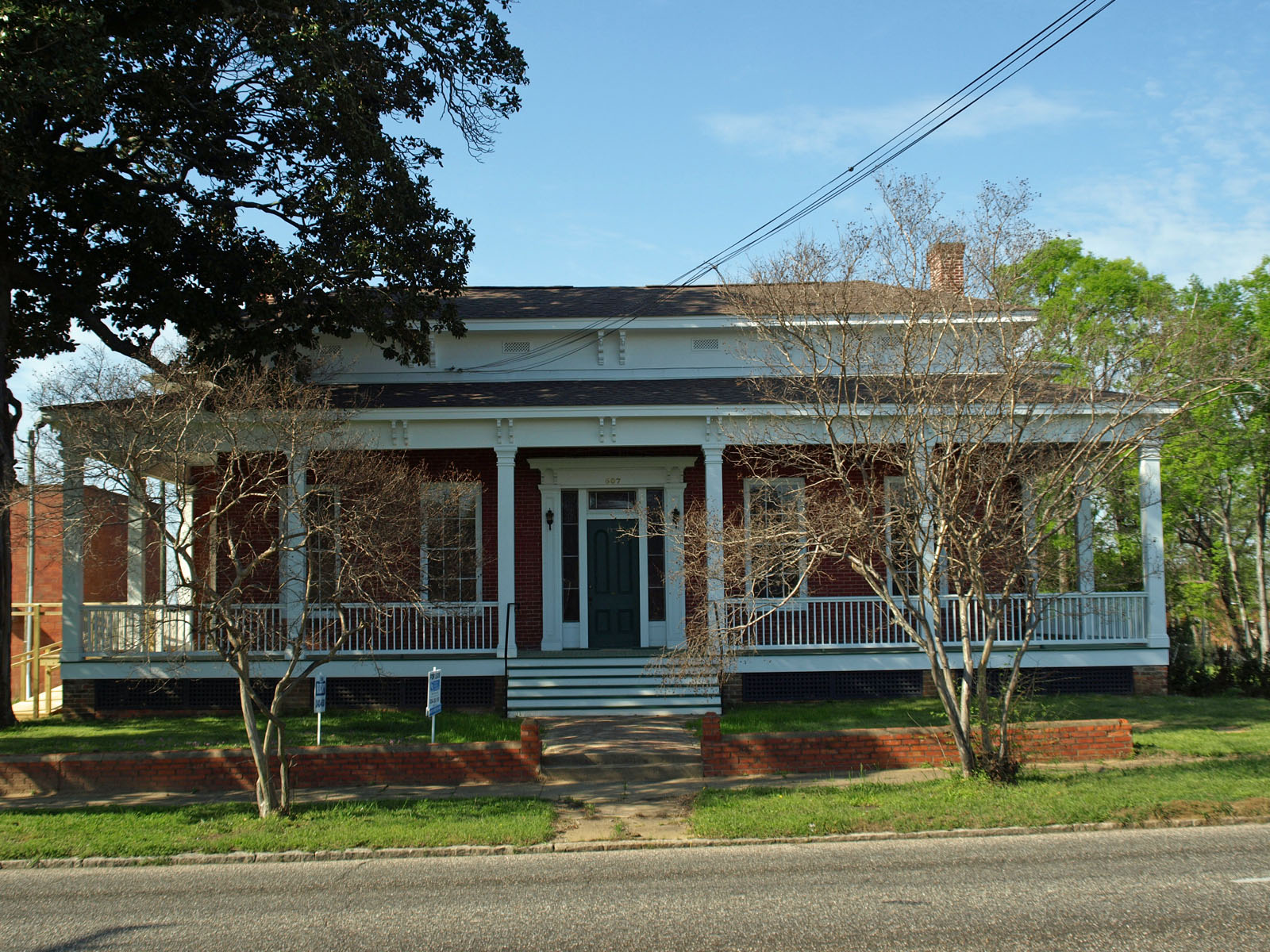
- The house in 2009

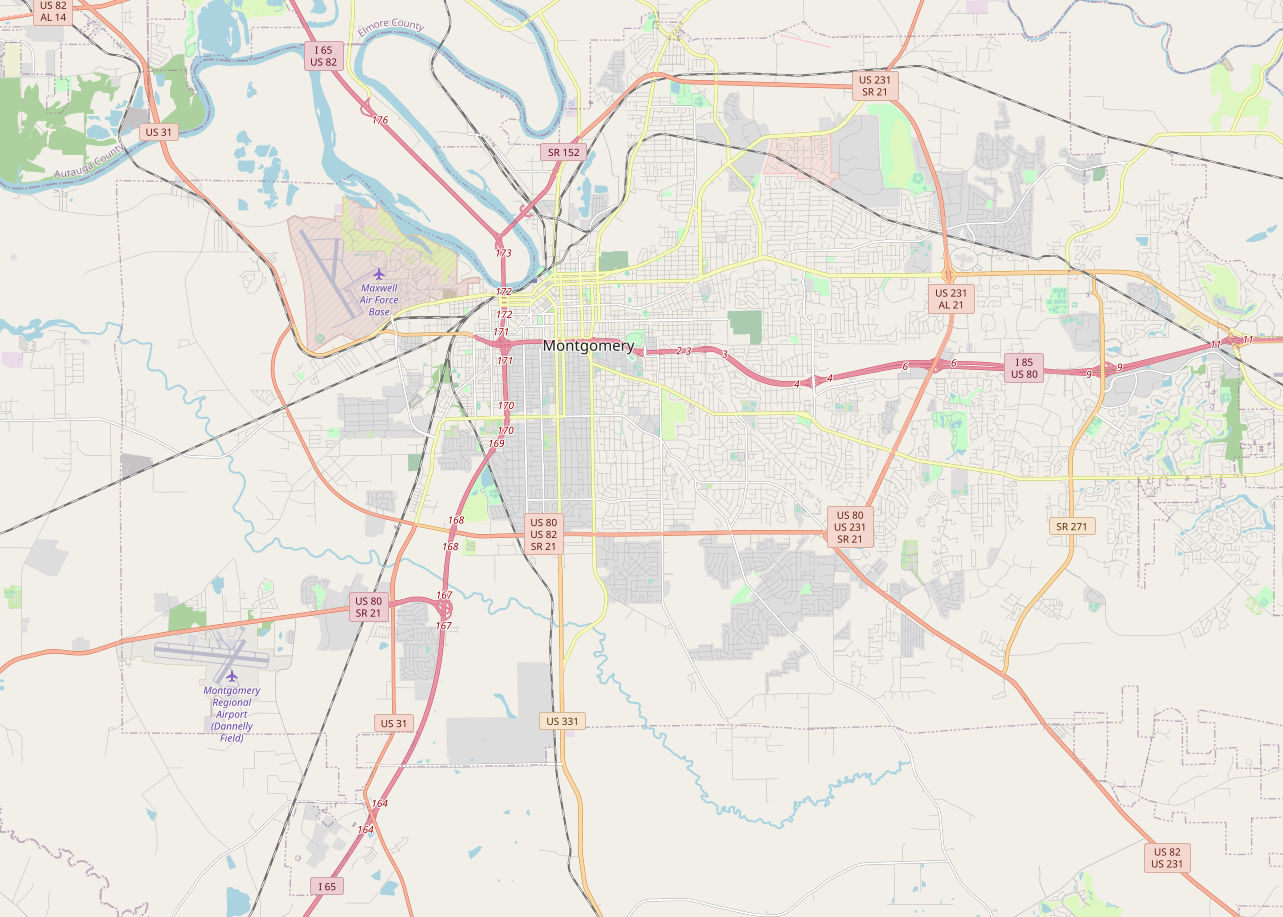
- Location within Montgomery, Alabama Location within Alabama Location within the United States
- Location: 507 Columbus St., Montgomery, Alabama
- Coordinates: 32°22′57″N 86°18′8″W
- Area: 0.4 acres (0.16 ha)
- Built: 1858
- Architectural style: Italianate
- NRHP reference No.: 79000393
- Added to NRHP: December 13, 1979

The Patrick Henry Brittan House, also known as the Brittan-Dennis House, is a historic Italianate style house in Montgomery, Alabama. The one-story brick house was completed in 1858 by Patrick Henry Brittan, 10th Secretary of State of Alabama. It was added to the National Register of Historic Places on December 13, 1979. The building is located at 507 Columbus Street.

== History ==
The house went through various owners after the Brittan family, and was eventually acquired by Old Alabama Town in 1994. Old Alabama Town is a partnership of the Landmarks Foundation of Montgomery and City of Montgomery. It was founded in 1967. Many of its more than fifty authentically restored 19th and early 20th century structures from around the state are clustered together into a village-like grouping that operates as a living history museum. They have restored the Patrick Henry Brittan House, and, unlike many of Old Alabama Town's rescued properties, it remains on its original site.

== See also ==
- National Register of Historic Places listings in Montgomery County, Alabama
