= Wharton-Chappell House =

Historic house in Montgomery, Alabama

- U.S. National Register of Historic Places
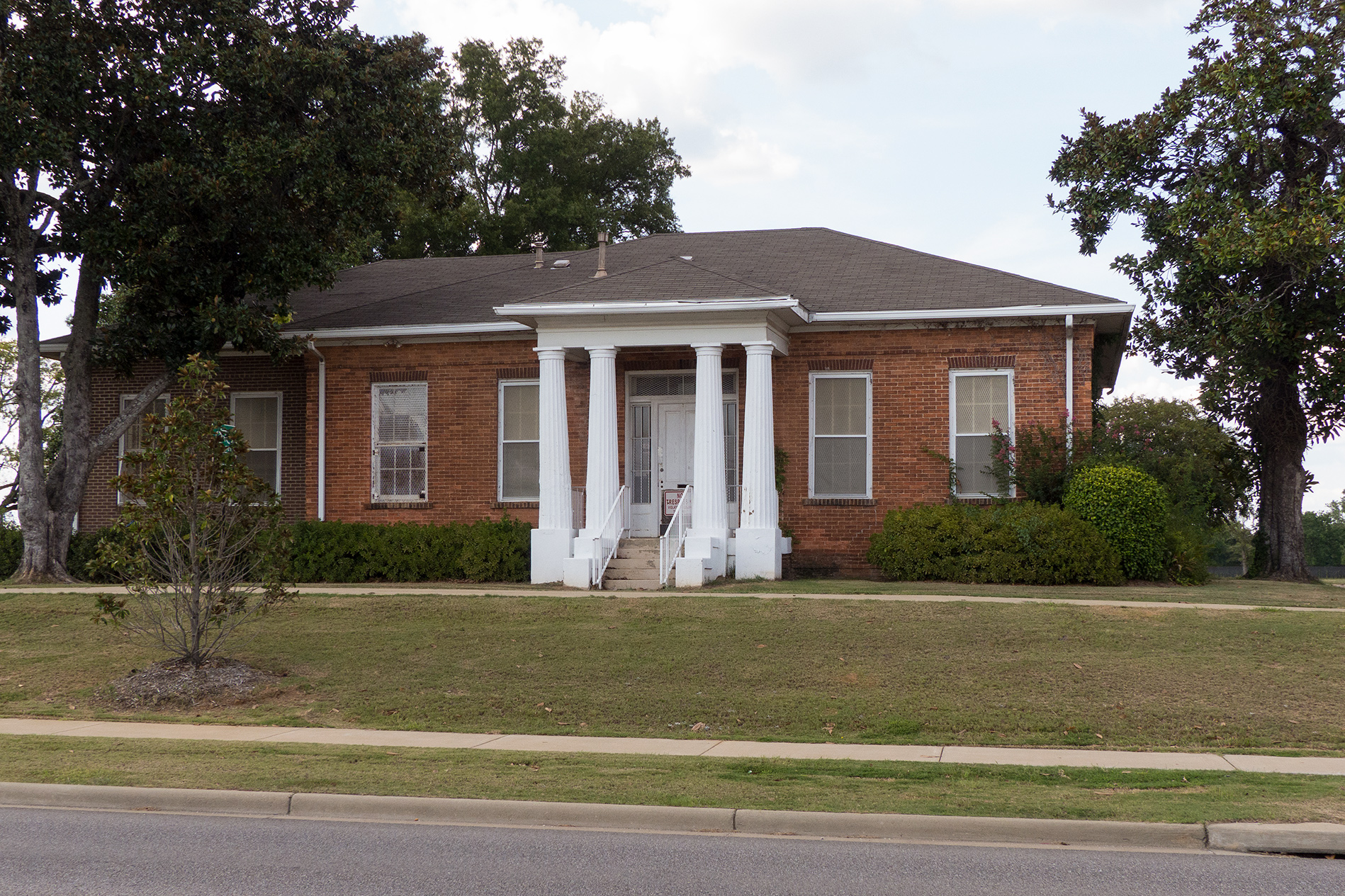
- The house in September 2016
- Interactive map of Wharton-Chappell House
- Location: 1020 Maxwell Blvd., Montgomery, Alabama
- Coordinates: 32°22′40″N 86°19′43″W
- Built: 1854
- NRHP reference No.: 16000445
- Added to NRHP: July 19, 2016

The Wharton–Chappell House is a historic residence in Montgomery, Alabama. The house was built in 1854 by William G. Wharton, who owned a brick works on an adjacent property. He sold the property in 1859 to Thomas Dorsey, whose widow married James Chappell in 1865. Chappell amassed over 450 acres (180 ha) of farmland on Montgomery's west side, including land surrounding the house. The house remained in the Chappell family until 1928. It was sold to the federal government in 1935, where the Public Works Administration built a housing project named Riverside Heights. The house was converted into offices for the complex, which opened in 1937 and was transferred to the city housing authority in 1939. The complex closed in 2006 and demolished in 2009, with only the house remaining. An artificial whitewater rafting park was opened on the site in 2023.

The house is a single-story brick building in Greek Revival style. The original façade is five bays wide; the 1958 ell addition adds two bays recessed on the west (left) side. The entry is covered by a hipped roof portico supported by paired Doric columns. The entry door is flanked by a transom and sidelights. The interior has a central hall with four rooms to the right, accessed through a vestibule. The 1958 ell lies to the left, and features a long hallway flanked by offices. A rear service building was added in 1935, and is accessed via a covered rear porch.

The house was listed on the National Register of Historic Places in 2016.
