= Stay House =

Historic house in Montgomery, Alabama

- U.S. National Register of Historic Places
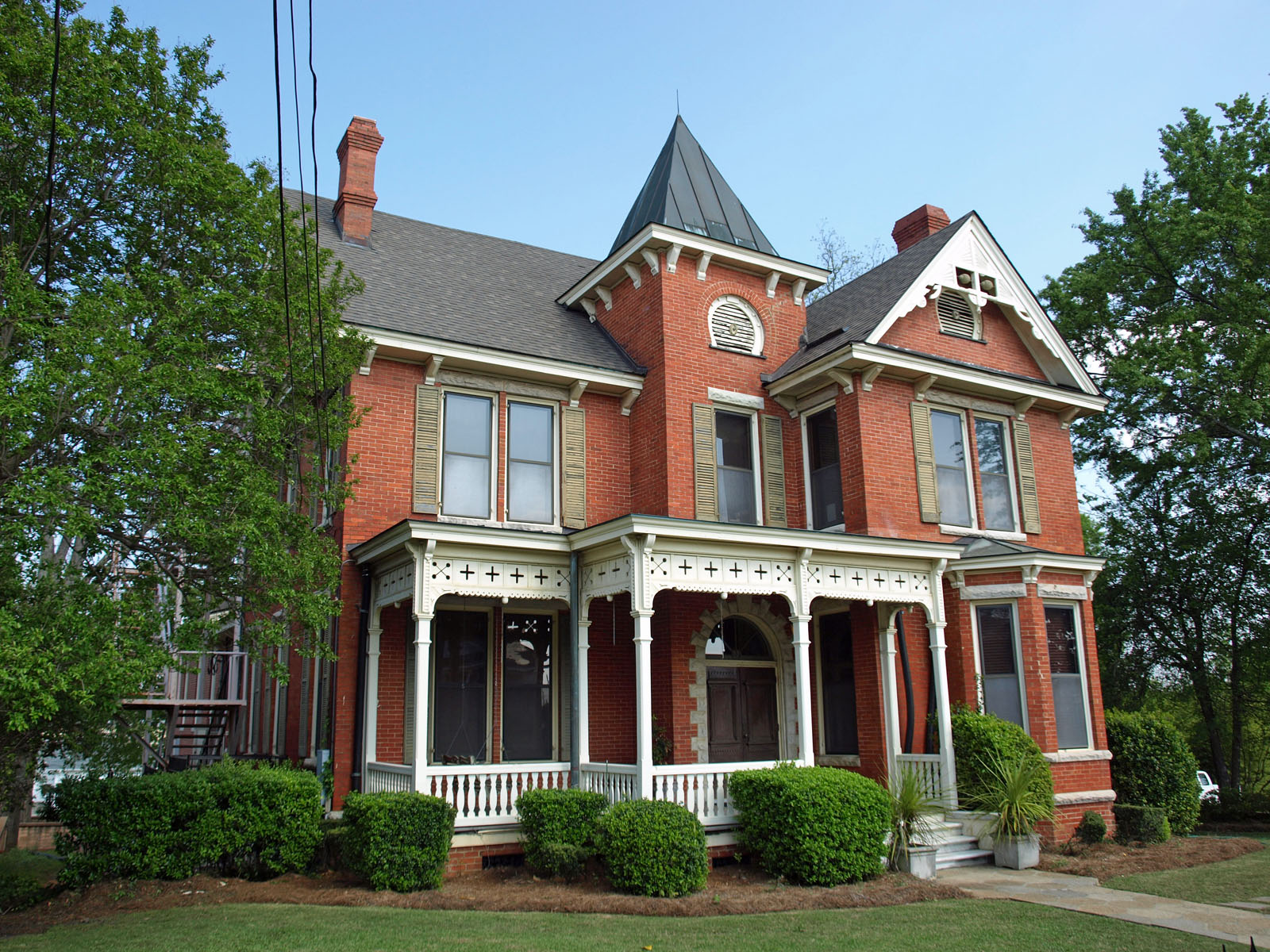
- The house in April 2009
- Interactive map of Stay House
- Location: 631 S. Hull St., Montgomery, Alabama
- Coordinates: 32°22′10″N 86°18′11″W
- Built: 1893
- NRHP reference No.: 79000396
- Added to NRHP: September 10, 1979

The Stay House is a historic residence in Montgomery, Alabama. The house was built in 1893 for physician and politician John Hazard Henry. Henry studied medicine in New York and Philadelphia before returning to Montgomery to practice. After his father's death in 1857 he moved to Selma and became active in politics, and was mayor at the end of the Civil War. Henry became active in the Republican Party, but abandoned his political career in the early 1880s, returning to Montgomery and resuming his medical practice.

The house is a two-story, brick veneer Victorian structure, with some Eastlakian trim. The three-bay façade has a gabled bay to the right of a central, square tower, both of which feature horseshoe shaped ventilators. A flat-roofed porch covers the left two bays. The arched front doorway has alternating stone voussoirs and a four-segment fanlight. The main block has a center-hall plan, with a one-story rear kitchen wing and enclosed rear porch.

The house was listed on the National Register of Historic Places in 1979.
