= McBryde–Screws–Tyson House =

Historic house in Alabama, United States

- U.S. National Register of Historic Places
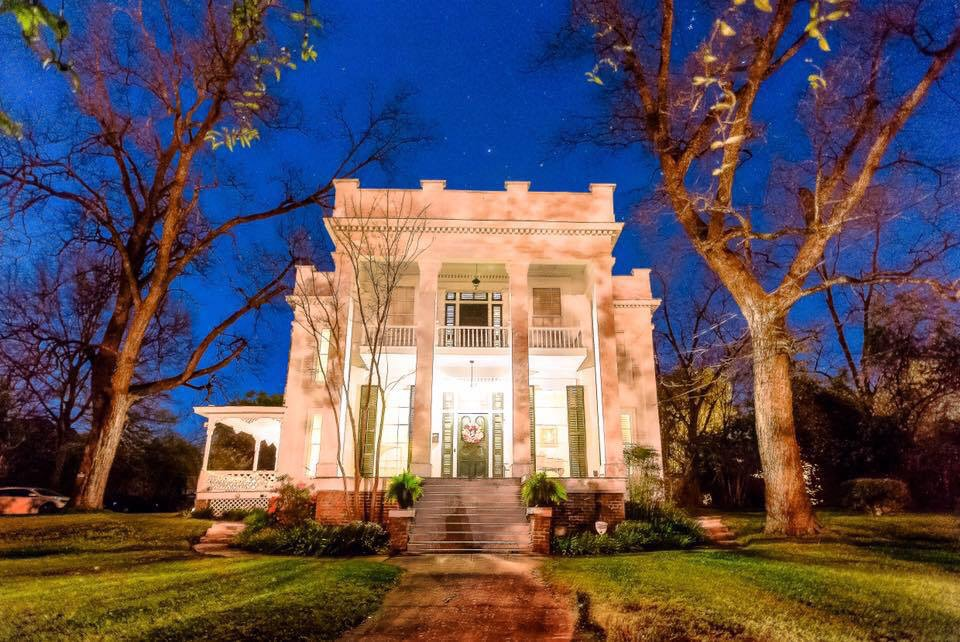

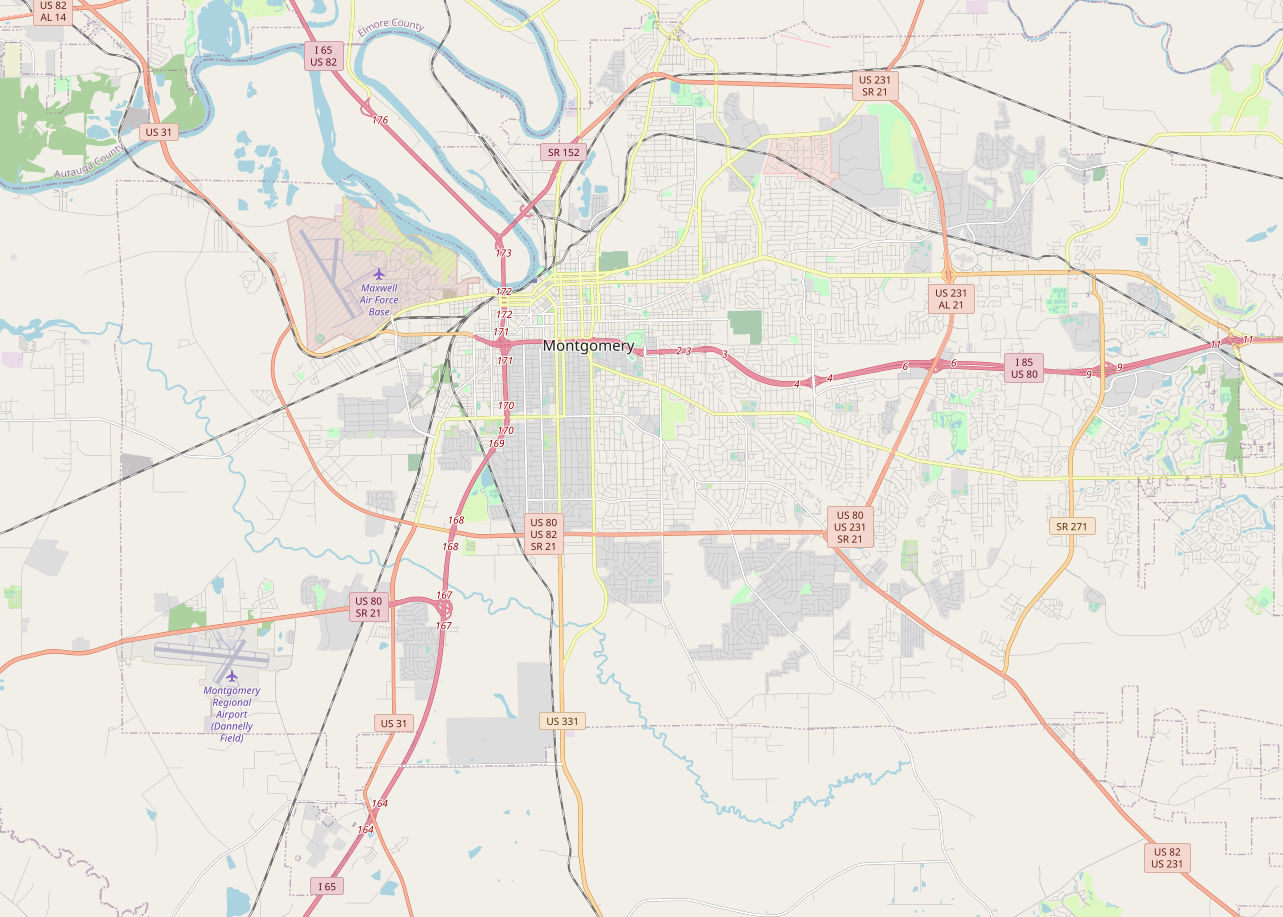
- Location within Montgomery, Alabama Location within Alabama Location within the United States
- Location: 333 Mildred St., Montgomery, Alabama
- Coordinates: 32°22′14″N 86°18′54″W
- Area: 2 acres (0.81 ha)
- Built: 1832, renovated 1855 and 1890
- Architectural style: Greek Revival
- NRHP reference No.: 80000730
- Added to NRHP: November 28, 1980

The McBryde–Screws–Tyson House, also known as the Tyson House, is a historic Greek Revival style house in Montgomery, Alabama. The two-story frame building was completed in 1832 and the Greek Revival facade added in 1855. It was added to the National Register of Historic Places on November 28, 1980.

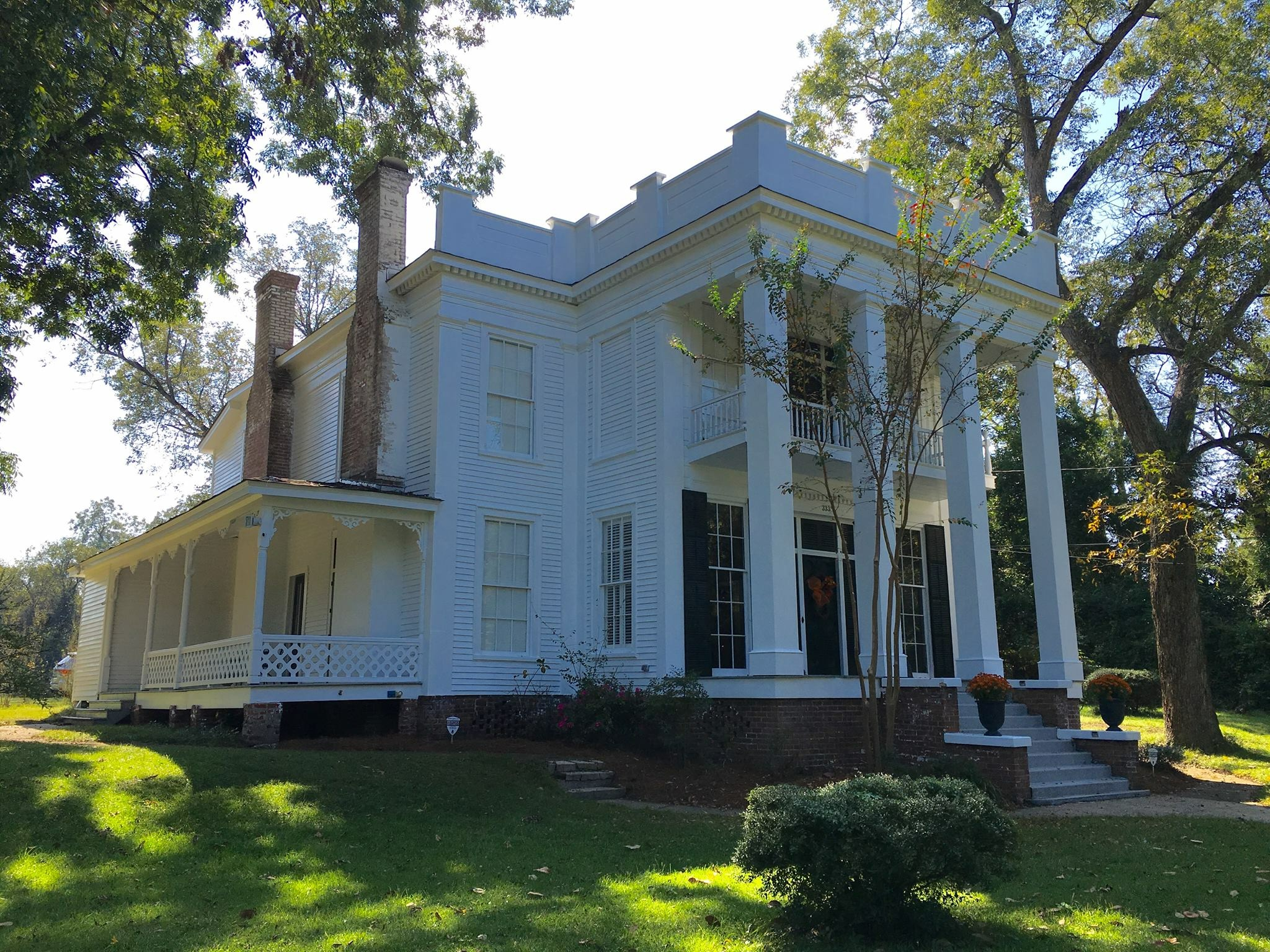
McBryde Tyson House

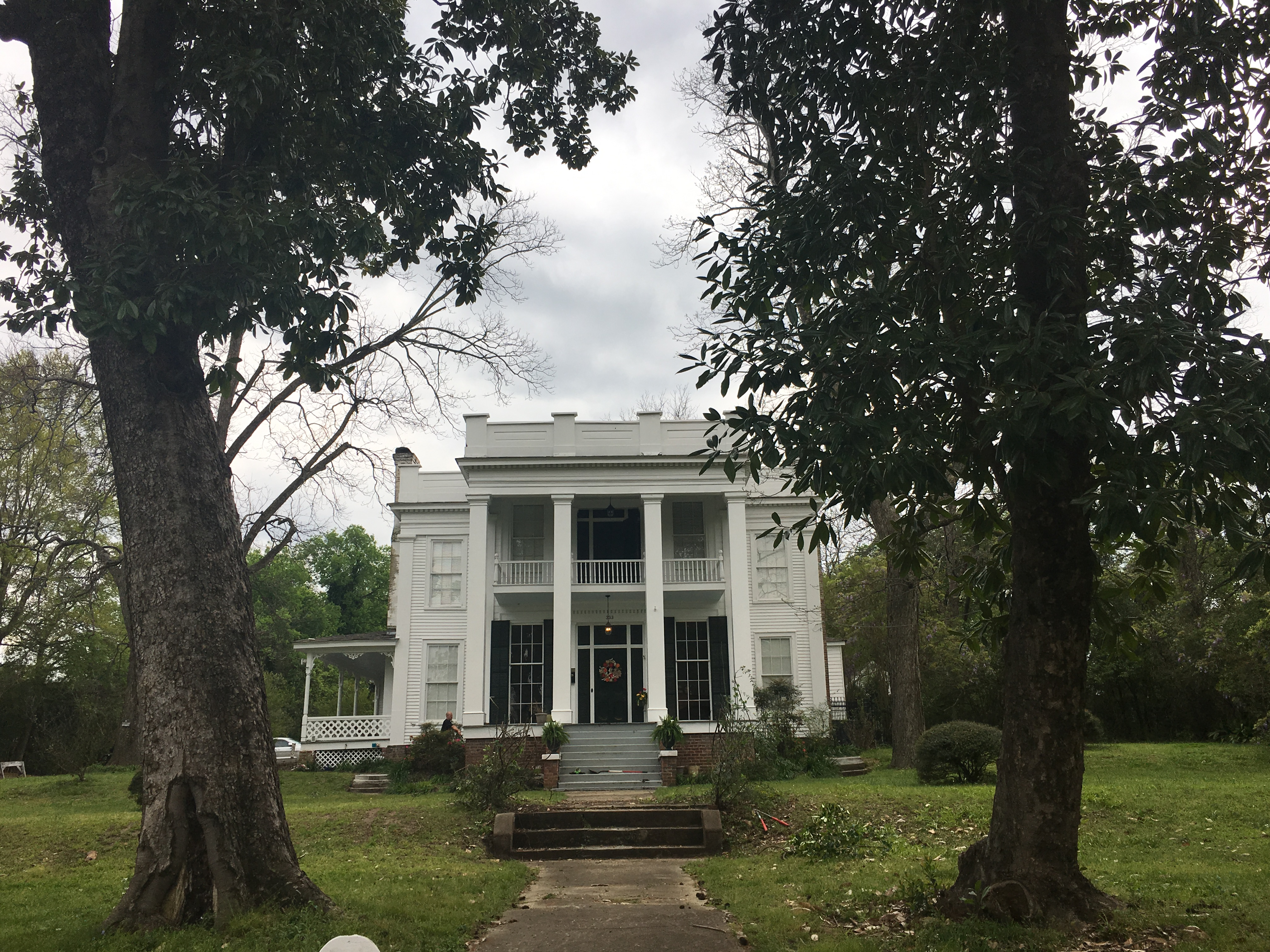

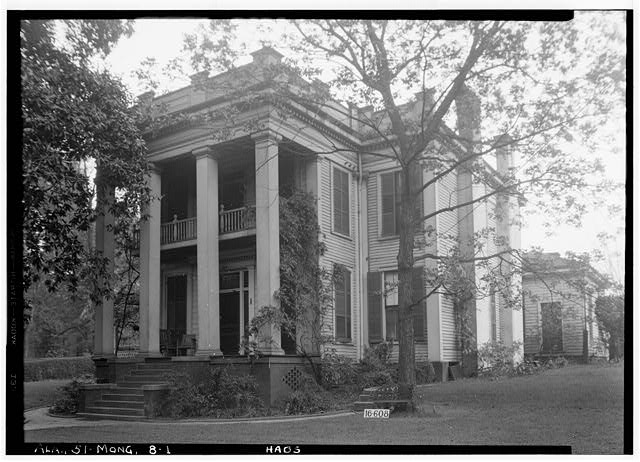
McBryde Tyson House

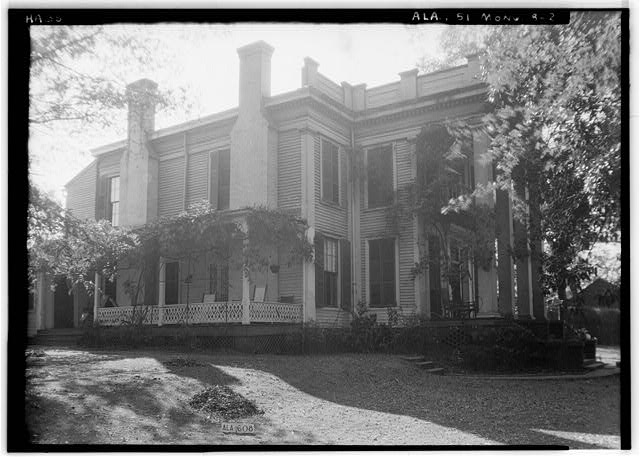
McBryde Tyson House

More photos from the Historic American Buildings Survey available:
