= South Perry Street Historic District =

Historic district in Montgomery, Alabama

- U.S. National Register of Historic Places
- U.S. Historic district
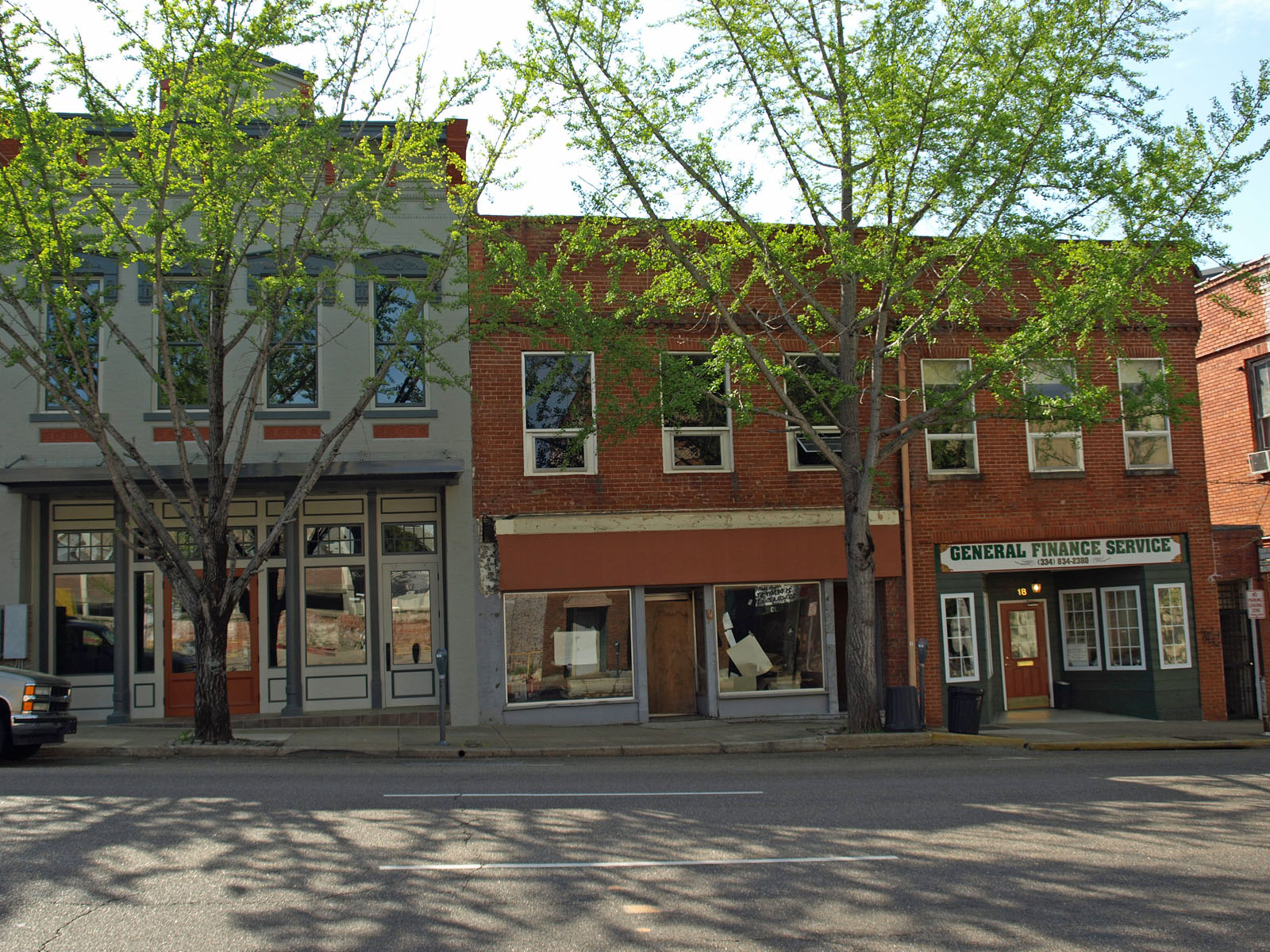
- Buildings on South Perry Street in March 2009
- Interactive map of South Perry Street Historic District
- Location: Roughly Perry St. between Washington St. and Dexter Ave., Montgomery, Alabama
- NRHP reference No.: 84000713
- Added to NRHP: August 30, 1984

The South Perry Street Historic District is a historic district in Montgomery, Alabama. The district covers a single block on Perry Street. The buildings on the block range from 1836 to 1925, and exhibit a range of styles, including Federal, late Victorian, Queen Anne, Neoclassical, and Art Deco, that follow the evolution of Montgomery's commercial areas. The block has hosted a number of prominent doctor's and law offices, including the William Lowndes Yancey Law Office.

The district was listed on the National Register of Historic Places in 1984.
