= Properties on the Alabama Register of Landmarks and Heritage by county (Madison–Perry) =

This is a list of properties on the Alabama Register of Landmarks and Heritage, sorted alphabetically by county. This list contains all entries for Madison County through Perry County, the other listings may be found here. The Alabama Register of Landmarks and Heritage is an official listing of buildings, sites, structures, objects, and districts deemed worthy of preservation in the U.S. state of Alabama.

These properties, which may be of national, state, and local significance, are designated by the Alabama Historical Commission, under the authority of the Alabama Legislature. General criteria for inclusion in the Alabama Register includes that the property is at least 40 years old; is associated with events of state or local significance; is associated with the lives of persons of state or local significance; is representative of a type, style, or period of architecture; or is associated with Alabama's history or prehistory. It must also possess integrity of location and construction and convey a feeling for the time and place of construction.

The Alabama Register occasionally includes properties that do not meet the general criteria for inclusion, such as moved or reconstructed structures. These properties are included when they have been sensitively relocated to a site similar to the original, closely match the construction of the original significant building, or are of exceptional importance to the state.

There are approximately 1,711 properties and districts listed on the Alabama Register. Of these, approximately 243 are also listed on the National Register of Historic Places (NRHP) and 6 are designated as National Historic Landmarks (NHL).

Madison – Marengo – Marion – Marshall – Mobile – Monroe – Montgomery – Morgan – Perry – See also – References

This list is complete through the most recent Alabama Historical Commission listings, posted January 8, 2025.

== Madison County ==
	Site name	Date listed	City or Town	Built or Established	NRHP/NHL
1	Alabama A&M University Historic District	August 3, 1990	Normal	1911	NRHP
2	Allison-Hewlett House and Cemetery	August 25, 1994	Huntsville	c. 1823	
3	Camp Monte Sano Archaeological Site	May 21, 2001	Huntsville	1888–98	
4	Dr. James L. Carpenter Home	April 19, 2006	New Hope	1936	
5	Cherokee Indian School House Land	July 11, 2006	Owens Cross Roads	c. 1800	
6	Constitution Hall Park	October 31, 1975	Huntsville	1819	
7	Ditto's Landing	September 30, 1999	Huntsville	c. 1807	
8	East Hall (Oakwood Sanitarium)	August 13, 1987	Huntsville	1909	
9	Fairview	October 20, 1977	Huntsville	c. 1868	
10	First Baptist Church	May 19, 2023	Huntsville	c. 1962-1966	
11	Ford-Countess House	October 31, 2013	Huntsville	c. 1820s	NRHP
12	Gurley Cumberland Presbyterian Church	November 4, 1987	Gurley	1912	
13	Gurley Historic District	November 17, 1995	Gurley	c. 1874-1972	NRHP
14	Harris Home for Children	April 30, 2020	Huntsville	1961	
15	House/Hinds Cemetery	March 22, 1991	Huntsville vicinity	1809–11	
16	Jordan–Moore–Kelly House	February 12, 2015	Huntsville	c. 1828	
17	Jude-Crutcher House	May 19, 1999	Huntsville	1812	NRHP
18	Kranz-Dreger House	March 24, 2022	Huntsville	1917	NRHP
19	Laura's View Train Station Archaeological Site	May 21, 2001	Huntsville	1889	
20	Lee Mansion (Moved to current site in 1975)	March 24, 2005	Madison	c. 1818, 1840	
21	Leech-Hauer House	July 28, 1978	Huntsville	c. 1830	NRHP
22	Lewis-Powell House	November 15, 2012	Madison	c. 1873	
23	Madison County Poorhouse Cemetery	November 2, 1990	New Market	c. 1870-1935	
24	Madison County Rosenwald School	October 25, 2018	Meridianville	c. 1923	
25	McCrary House	January 31, 1979	Huntsville vicinity	Prior to 1830, 1870	NRHP
26	Memphis and Charleston Railroad Freight Depot	June 25, 2002	Huntsville	c. 1856	NRHP
27	Monte Sano Elementary School	January 19, 1999	Huntsville	1958–59	
28	Monte Sano State Park	June 19, 1996	Huntsville	1930s	
29	Moore-Jordan-Busbin Mansion (Flint River Place)	October 1, 1981	Huntsville	Late 1840s	NRHP
30	New Hope High School (Demolished)	June 14, 1977	New Hope	1920, 1936	
31	New Market Historic District	July 22, 1991	New Market	1850–1940	NRHP
32	Otey House	January 31, 1979	Meridianville	c. 1850	NRHP
33	Owens Cross Roads Church of Christ (Demolished)	February 4, 2000	Owens Cross Roads	1933	
34	Phelps-Jones House	January 31, 1979	Huntsville	Early 1820s	NRHP
35	Pioneer Log Cabin	September 20, 2006	Owens Cross Roads vicinity	Early 19th century	
36	Poplar Ridge School	August 3, 1990	New Hope	1858	
37	William LaFayette Quick House	May 23, 1988	New Market	Early 20th century	
38	Robert P. Cain Mercantile	June 20, 2013	Madison	c. 1859	
39	Schrimsher Farm/Sunrise Terrace Subdivision	May 19, 1998	Huntsville	1950	
40	Simmons House	May 26, 1975	Huntsville	c. 1850	
41	St. John AME Church	June 27, 2019	Huntsville	1970	
42	Steamboat Gothic House	October 27, 1975	Huntsville	1890	
43	Steger-Nance House (Dr. Howard Place)	September 24, 1981	Huntsville	c. 1854	NRHP
44	Temple B'nai Sholom	July 29, 1977	Huntsville	1898	NRHP
45	The Cross on Round Top Mountain	December 10, 2020	Huntsville	1963	
46	Union Chapel, Campus of University of Alabama in Huntsville (UAH)	September 7, 1975	Huntsville	c. 1835	
47	Viduta Historic District	March 8, 1994	Huntsville	1830–1930	
48	Warden's Residence, Wheeler National Wildlife Refuge	February 2, 2001	Triana	1941	NRHP
49	William Hooper Councill High School	February 2, 2001	Huntsville	1927–53	

== Marengo County ==
	Site name	Date listed	City or Town	Built or Established	NRHP/NHL
1	Altwood	February 19, 1988	Faunsdale	c. 1836	NRHP
2	Ashe Cottage (Ely House)	August 22, 1975	Demopolis	1832	NRHP
3	Askew House (Beechwood) (moved in 1983)	July 29, 1992	Linden vicinity	c. 1847-48	
4	Bethel Baptist Church	April 11, 1984	McKinley	c. 1840	
5	Bolton-Agee House	October 4, 1978	Demopolis	Mid-1840s	
6	Dayton "Town Hall" (Boddie Law Office)	September 9, 1977	Dayton	c. 1858	
7	First United Methodist Church	October 4, 1978	Demopolis	1895–97	
8	Frank Lankster House	December 9, 2021	Linden	c. 1954	
9	Marengo County High School	March 24, 1995	Thomaston	1909	
10	Morning Star Baptist Church	May 13, 1988	Demopolis	c. 1914-1920	
11	Putnam School	August 5, 2010	Putnam	1926	
12	Robertson Banking Company	October 12, 1976	Demopolis	Early 20th century	
13	Rosenbush Furniture Company	June 20, 1978	Demopolis	c. 1895	
14	Bert & Mary Rosenbush House	August 5, 2010	Demopolis	1952–1954	
15	St. Leo's Catholic Church	January 31, 1979	Demopolis	1905	
16	St. Luke Missionary Baptist Church	December 1, 2016	Gallion	c. 1913	
17	Spight-Davis House	October 4, 1978	Demopolis	1854	
18	Victorian House (Dr. Cock's Office)	June 19, 1997	Demopolis	c. 1890	
19	Victorian House (Parr House) (demolished)	June 19, 1997	Demopolis	c. 1890	
20	Victorian House (Shelby's Boarding House)	June 19, 1997	Demopolis	c. 1890	
21	Welch-George House	September 20, 1978	Demopolis	c. 1882	

== Marion County ==
	Site name	Date listed	City or Town	Built or Established	NRHP/NHL
1	Ada Hannah School	November 9, 2017		c. 1965	
2	Dickinson's Store	July 18, 1989	Brilliant	1907	
3	Ernest Baxter Fite House and Law Office	December 4, 1992	Hamilton	c. 1927-28	NRHP
4	Friendship North Baptist Church	August 18, 2022	Detroit	c. 1920; 1950	
5	Hamilton House	July 15, 1976	Hamilton	1875	
6	Henson Service Station	February 21, 2019	Guin	1942	
7	R. W. Harris & Son General Merchandise Store and Warehouse	April 18, 2007	Winfield	1911	
8	Hillcrest	September 6, 1984	Winfield	c. 1921–22	
9	Johnson Rural Medical Museum	October 19, 1979	Hamilton	c. 1902	
10	Pastime Theatre	February 12, 2015	Winfield	c. 1937	
11	Judge Terrell House	August 5, 2010	Pikeville	c. 1820s	
12	Winfield Bank	October 1, 1997	Winfield	1961	
13	Winfield High School Gymnasium	July 15, 2021	Winfield	c. 1941	
14	Winfield WPA/NYA Building	May 6, 2020	Winfield	1940	

== Marshall County ==
	Site name	Date listed	City or Town	Built or Established	NRHP/NHL
1	Albertville High School	March 24, 1995	Albertville	c. 1912	
2	Albertville National Bank	November 16, 2024	Albertville	c. 1904	
3	Boaz Elementary School	June 26, 2003	Boaz	1924	
4	Christ Episcopal Church	October 19, 1979	Albertville	1882	
5	Claysville School	June 24, 2004	Guntersville	1928	
6	East Main Street Historic District	May 19, 1998	Albertville	c. 1880-1974	
7	Episcopal Church of the Epiphany (Moved to Boaz)	June 19, 1996	Guntersville	1917	
8	First Baptist Church and Cemetery	February 6, 1998	Boaz	1922–23	
9	First National Bank	January 22, 2009	Guntersville	c. 1926	
10	First Presbyterian Church	October 19, 1979	Guntersville	1911	
11	Colonel Montgomery Gilbreath House	June 26, 2003	Guntersville	c. 1843	
12	Guntersville Depot	March 7, 2002	Guntersville	1892	
13	Harbor Master Building at City Boat Docks (demolished)	May 19, 1998	Guntersville	Mid-1950s	
14	A.R. Hooper House (Lake Guntersville Bed & Breakfast)	January 22, 2009	Guntersville	c. 1910	
15	Hotel Thompson (Burned 1989, formerly listed on NRHP)	August 22, 1985	Arab	1890, 1936	
16	Methodist Episcopal Church	June 30, 1995	Boaz	1917	
17	Howard Powell Estate	August 25, 2011	Guntersville	c. 1890	
18	Snead Junior College	April 6, 1998	Boaz	1920–42	NRHP
19	Snellgrove Homestead	June 30, 1995	Boaz	1900	NRHP
20	Spanish House (Carter House)	September 15, 1975	Guntersville	1928	

== Mobile County ==
	Site name	Date listed	City or Town	Built or Established	NRHP/NHL
1	Ace Theater	April 30, 2020	Mobile	c. 1940	
2	Alexander House	July 6, 1978	Mobile	1853	
3	Bankhead Tunnel	January 25, 1977	Mobile	1938	
4	Battleship Alabama Memorial Park	October 28, 1977	Mobile	1965	2 NHL's
5	Bellingrath Gardens and Home	September 14, 1977	Theodore vicinity	1927, 1935	NRHP
6	Blackwell House	July 15, 2001	Semmes	c. 1951	
7	Chunchula School	June 27, 2007	Chunchula	c. 1909	
8	Citronelle Depot	February 20, 1986	Citronelle	1902, 1917	
9	Coden Post Office	May 22, 2008	Coden	c. 1906	
10	Creola Station	December 19, 1991	Creola	1905	
11	Dawes-Theodore School	July 18, 1989	Theodore	1911	
12	Ebenezer Baptist Church of Cottage Hill	September 12, 2019	Mobile	1969	
13	Faith-Brown House	September 9, 1977	Mobile	1878	
14	Fowl River Community House	March 24, 1995	Theodore	c. 1939	
15	Ella Grant School (House of Hope Inc)	March 8, 1994	Prichard	1923	
16	Gulf City Paper Company Site	July 17, 1981	30 miles (48 km) north of Mobile on U.S. 45	1867–78	
17	Howell House	September 16, 2021	Semmes	c. 1897, 1920	
18	Kimball-McMillan-Yarborough House	July 29, 1977	Mobile	c. 1855	
19	Kirk House	May 28, 2009	Axis	1914	
20	Loper-Young House	February 4, 2000	Chickasaw	1919	
21	Manley-Ruther House	February 4, 2000	Chickasaw	1919	
22	Alfred Sidney McDonald House	February 4, 2000	Chickasaw		
23	Mose Hudson Tapia Library	September 3, 2020	Bayou La Batre	1933; 1963	
24	Nan Grey Davis House	December 16, 2010	Theodore	c. 1921	
25	Rabby House	May 22, 2008	Coden	c. 1840	
26	Rosa A. Lott School (Citronelle Consolidated School)	May 19, 2011	Citronelle	c. 1948	
27	Royal Oaks	July 15, 2021	Coden	c. 1896	
28	St. Rose of Lima Historic District	March 1, 2024	Coden	c. 1853-1995	
29	St. Thomas Episcopal Church	September 26, 2007	Citronelle	1895	
30	Satsuma School	May 23, 1988	Satsuma	1936	
31	Semmes First Baptist Church and Cemetery	August 18, 2022	Semmes	1959;1970; 1989; 1998; 2000	
32	Semmes High School/Semmes Middle School	December 9, 2021	Semmes	c. 1949; 1950	
33	Semmes School	August 25, 1994	Semmes	1902	
34	Shiloh Missionary Baptist Church	December 19, 2019	Mobile	1960	
35	Smith-Goolsby House	September 30, 1999	Chickasaw	1919	
36	Springhill Avenue United Methodist Church	August 18, 2022	Mobile	1952; 1964; 1979	
37	Jay W. Stack House	July 22, 1991	Mobile	1926	
38	State Street AME Zion Church	October 20, 1977	Mobile	1854	NRHP
39	Steam Locomotive 1527	August 19, 1976	Mobile	1926	
40	Stone Street Baptist Church	April 11, 1984	Mobile	1909, 1931	NRHP
41	Tanner Williams Old School House	August 24, 2022	Tanner Williams	1915	
42	Whistler Historic District	November 26, 1975	Prichard	Early 20th century	

== Monroe County ==
	Site name	Date listed	City or Town	Built or Established	NRHP/NHL
1	Bethany Baptist Church and Cemetery	May 3, 2001	Burnt Corn	1874	
2	Concord Baptist Church	January 31, 1978	Buena Vista	1904–05	
3	Dennis House	August 19, 1983	Monroeville	1905	
4	First National Bank of Monroeville (Elbrecht Building)	November 13, 1996	Monroeville	c. 1925	
5	Hendrix-Morgan Home	May 19, 2011	Mexia	c. 1904	
6	C. L. Hybart House	May 22, 2008	Monroeville	c. 1926	
7	Indian Springs Baptist Church and Cemetery	June 26, 2003	McWilliams vicinity	1825	
8	Lee Family Home	August 6, 2024	Monroeville	c. 1952	
9	McDuffie Place	May 22, 2008	Franklin vicinity	c. 1860–90	
10	Monroe County Public Library	May 22, 2008	Monroeville	c. 1938	
11	Monroeville Rosenwald School Site and Industrial Jr. High School	December 10, 2020	Monroeville	1927; 1960	
12	MT. Pleasant Methodist Church and Cemetery	March 24, 2022	Uriah	c. 1820; 1895; c. 1940; 2020	
13	New Hope Baptist Church and Cemetery	February 4, 2000	Natchez	c. 1855	NRHP
14	Old Salem Baptist Church	February 21, 2019	Frisco City	1950; 1952; 1978	
15	Old Scotland Presbyterian Church	May 23, 1988	Tunnel Springs vicinity	1837	
16	Perdue Hill Masonic Lodge	November 1, 1976	Perdue Hill	1819	
17	Calvin J. Rhodes House	September 28, 2004	Excel vicinity	c. 1890	
18	Rikard's Mill (Reconstructed 1993–94)	October 7, 1998	Beatrice	1935	
19	Turnbull House	June 14, 2018	Beatrice	c. 1838	
20	Village of Buena Vista	April 14, 1978	Buena Vista	Early 19th century	
21	Watkins House	October 4, 1993	Burnt Corn vicinity	c. 1830	

== Montgomery County ==
	Site name	Date listed	City or Town	Built or Established	NRHP/NHL
1	Abner McGehee Burying Ground	November 13, 1996	Hope Hull	1827–1935	
2	Alabama War Memorial	October 28, 1977	Montgomery	1968	
3	Alabama State University Historic District	August 25, 1994	Montgomery	1916–45	NRHP
4	Aurelia Eliscera Shines Browder House	August 5, 2010	Montgomery	1920	
5	J. M. Barnes House	December 19, 1991	Montgomery	1898	
6	Belser-Marshall House (demolished 2006)	March 12, 1997	Mt. Meigs	c. 1840	
7	Bethel Cemetery	September 30, 1999	Pintlala	1843–1962	
8	Bethlehem Primitive Baptist Church & Cemetery	May 19, 2011	Lapine	c. 1932	
9	Bethelonia Missionary Baptist Church	August 18, 2022	Montgomery	c. 1900-1915	
10	Black Bricklayers Hall	February 21, 2019	Montgomery	1912	
11	Margaret Booth School for Girls (Montgomery Fellowship House for Men)	April 11, 1984	Montgomery	1880s	NRHP
12	Brame-Cody-Neal House	January 29, 1980	Montgomery	1836	NRHP
13	Brantwood Children's Home	November 9, 2017	Montgomery	c. 1928	
14	Aurelia Eliscera Shines Browder House	August 5, 2010	Montgomery	c. 1920	
15	Cecil Rosenwald School	April 1, 2010	Cecil vicinity	c. 1923	
16	Centennial Hill Historic District	April 14, 1992	Montgomery	c. 1872-1950	NRHP
17	Church of The Good Shepherd	January 29, 1980	Montgomery	c. 1900-1901	
18	Clay Street Baptist Church	September 20, 2006	Montgomery	1956	
19	Cleveland Court Apartments 620–638	March 30, 1989	Montgomery	1943	NRHP
20	Cole-Samford House	February 15, 1977	Montgomery	c. 1915	
21	Claudette Colvin House	August 5, 2010	Montgomery	1940	
22	Collier School Historic District	March 21, 2024	Grady	c. 1930, 1957, 1963	
23	Community House (Jackson-Community House)	July 21, 1978	Montgomery	1853	NRHP
24	Cottage Hill Historic District	April 16, 1975	Montgomery	Late 19th– Early 20th century	NRHP
25	Cradle of the Confederacy Railroad Museum (Louisville & Nashville Baggage Car No. 1456 at Montgomery Union Station)	January 29, 1980	Montgomery	1926–74	
26	Davis Theater for the Performing Arts	April 11, 1984	Montgomery	1929	
27	Tony Davis Jr. House	December 4, 1992	Hope Hull	c. 1871	
28	Day Street Baptist Church	June 20, 1978	Montgomery	1882	
29	Department of Public Safety Headquarters and Museum	April 14, 1978	Montgomery	1937	
30	Ebenezer Primitive Baptist Church and Cemetery	January 24, 2008	Ramer	c. 1836	
31	Electric Street Car at Montgomery Union Station (current location unknown)	May 9, 1978	Montgomery	1886	
32	Executive House (Charles S. Conley Law Office)	October 31, 2013	Montgomery	c. 1945	
33	First Baptist Church	May 10, 2000	Montgomery	1910–15	NRHP
34	First White House of the Confederacy	August 14, 2012	Montgomery	1832–35	NRHP
35	Fourth Aviation Squadron Historic District, Maxwell Air Force Base	September 27, 2007	Montgomery	1942	
36	Frazier Hill	June 25, 2002	Montgomery	c. 1830	
37	General Richard Montgomery Riverboat	July 21, 1976	Montgomery	1974–76	
38	Georgia Washington School	November 10, 2017	Mt. Meigs	1950s	
39	Grace Episcopal Church	January 29, 1980	Mt. Meigs	1892–93	NRHP
40	Grady School (South Montgomery County Academy)	November 15, 2012	Grady	c. 1927	
41	Gunter House (demolished)	June 2, 1981	Ramer	c. 1830s	
42	Highland Avenue School	October 22, 1993	Montgomery	1903	
43	Holt Street Baptist Church	May 26, 1986	Montgomery	1913	
44	Kilby Hall at Alabama State University	August 25, 1994	Montgomery	1922	
45	Lincoln Cemetery	September 30, 1999	Montgomery	1907	
46	Little House (demolished)	January 31, 1979	Montgomery	c. 1890	
47	Loveless School	March 8, 2023	Montgomery	c. 1923	
48	Brake and Edna Lucas House	September 27, 2007	Mt. Meigs vicinity	c. 1900	
49	Lucas House	February 20, 1986	Mt. Meigs	1826	
50	Madison Park School	March 29, 2012	Montgomery	c. 1955	
51	Marks House	November 23, 1976	Pike Road	1825–30	
52	McIntyre-Napier House	March 13, 1996	Ramer	1941–56	
53	Metcalf-Crommelin-Wood House (World Heritage Museum)	October 14, 1981	Montgomery	1890s	
54	Marshall J. Moore House	February 25, 1999	Montgomery	1900	
55	Mt. Olive Baptist Church	September 12, 2019	Montgomery	1959	
56	Mount Zion AME Zion Church	June 30, 1995	Montgomery	1899	NRHP
57	Edgar D. Nixon House	May 26, 1986	Montgomery	c. 1946-1948	
58	Noble-Adair-Roper House (Noble Hill)	January 31, 1979	Montgomery	c. 1881	
59	Old Selma Farm	April 1, 2010	Montgomery	1942	
60	Old Ship African Methodist Episcopal Zion Church	March 3, 1976	Montgomery	1834	NRHP
61	M. K. Paul Store (Shaver Store)	August 25, 2011	Pine Level	c. 1860	
62	Pintlala School	April 14, 1992	Pintlala		
63	Providence Presbyterian Church	March 25, 1983	Le Grand	1854, 1895	
64	Ramer Baptist Church (Old Ramer Baptist Church/Ramer Masonic Lodge #243)	November 13, 1996	Ramer	c. 1858	
65	Red's Little School House	October 7, 1998	Grady	1910, 1985	
66	Riverview (Tyson Baber Plantation)	December 19, 1991	Montgomery vicinity	1830s–1880s	
67	Rose Hill	July 18, 1989	Mt. Meigs	1918	
68	Sidney Lanier High School	October 31, 2013	Montgomery	1928–29	
69	Stone-Young Plantation (Magnolia)	September 28, 2000	Montgomery	1852	NRHP
70	Tabernacle Methodist Church	July 6, 1978	Pintlala	c. 1893	
71	Tankersley Rosenwald School	June 26, 2003	Hope Hull	c. 1922	NRHP
72	Tharin Hall	October 7, 1998	Snowdoun	c. 1880	
73	Thorington-Arrington-Campbell House	February 2, 1983	Montgomery	1914	
74	F. J. Tillison House (The Teacher's Home)	December 4, 1992	Ramer	1900	
75	Charlie and Lucille Times House	September 27, 2007	Montgomery	c. 1939	
76	Trinity Lutheran Church and Parsonage	June 27, 2019	Montgomery	c. 1948	
77	Tulane-Simmons House	April 19, 2006	Montgomery	c. 1921	
78	Union Chapel African Methodist Episcopal Zion Church	August 10, 2017	Montgomery	c. 1962	
79	West Boylston Manufacturing Company Textile Mill and Mill Village	September 24, 2002	Montgomery	c. 1927–28	
80	Western Railway of Alabama Car Shops and Engine Terminal Historic District	May 19, 1998	Montgomery	1898–1920s	
81	Bertha P. Williams Library	October 25, 2018	Montgomery	1960	
82	Hank Williams Grave at Oakwood Cemetery Annex	January 25, 1977	Montgomery	1954	
83	Willow Glen	April 11, 1984	Grady	1872	
84	Winter Place	September 29, 2005	Montgomery	c. 1850, c. 1870	NRHP
85	Wright Brothers Flying School Site (Wright Brothers Hangar) at Maxwell Air Force Base (replica built and dismantled in 1976)	November 5, 1976	Montgomery	1910, 1976	

== Morgan County ==
	Site name	Date listed	City or Town	Built or Established	NRHP/NHL
1	Barta Log Cabin (John Y. Ferguson Log Dwelling)	January 24, 2008	Hartselle vicinity	c. 1850-1860	
2	Bethel Road Historic District	December 21, 1977	Hartselle	Early 1900	
3	Carver School	March 29, 2012	Decatur	c. 1928	
4	Confederate Memorial Monument on the Morgan County Courthouse lawn	March 24, 2005	Decatur	1922	
5	Cotaco Opera House (Masonic Lodge)	November 5, 1976	Decatur	1890	NRHP
6	Crabb–Key House	June 14, 2018	Hartselle	c. 1830	NRHP
7	Dancy-Polk House	October 11, 1978	Decatur	1829	NRHP
8	East Main Street	July 21, 1975	Hartselle	Early 20th century	
9	First Missionary Baptist Church	November 2, 1990	Decatur	1919	
10	First Presbyterian Church	December 9, 2021	Decatur	1953; 1978	
11	Forest Home	October 19, 1979	Trinity vicinity	1857–59	NRHP
12	Garner Memorial CME Church	December 16, 2010	Decatur	c. 1945	
13	Hartselle Depot	May 12, 1976	Hartselle	1915	
14	Hartselle Elementary School (F. E. Burleson Elementary School)	May 3, 2001	Hartselle	1916	
15	Hartselle Tabernacle	December 15, 1989	Hartselle	1897	
16	L & N Freight Depot	March 13, 1996	Hartselle	1915	
17	Morrow Cemetery	November 13, 1978	Somerville vicinity	Rev. War era	
18	William Murphey House	April 16, 1985	Trinity vicinity	c. 1830	NRHP
19	Old Cotaco White House	March 8, 1994	Somerville	c. 1818	
20	Old Decatur Courthouse Site	April 23, 1976	Decatur	1926	
21	Old Morgan County High School	January 31, 1979	Hartselle	1909	
22	Price-Wooten Home (Springwood)	October 17, 1980	Priceville	1856	
23	Princess Theater (In the Albany Heritage Neighborhood Historic District)	October 23, 1981	Decatur	1887	NRHP
24	R. W. Puckett House	March 25, 2004	Hartselle	c. 1896	
25	Ratliff–Lyle House	January 22, 2009	Priceville	1847–1870s	
26	Roberts Duplex	May 10, 2000	Hartselle	1935	
27	Robinson Farmhouse	November 15, 2012	Priceville	c. 1924	
28	Saint John Elementary School	March 24, 2022	Somerville	1901	
29	Southern L&N Railroad Merchant Shops (Demolished December 28, 2000)	May 19, 1999	Decatur	Late 19th century	
30	U. S. Post Office (Hartselle Utilities Building)	May 26, 1986	Hartselle	1939	
31	Wayman Chapel AME Church	December 16, 2010	Decatur	c. 1907	
32	Westview Plantation	October 19, 1979	Decatur vicinity	1841	NRHP
33	Rev. John Paul Mose Woodall House	March 25, 2004	Hartselle	c. 1896	
34	Wyatt-Malone Building	December 9, 2021	Decatur	c. 1920; c. 1968	

== Perry County ==
	Site name	Date listed	City or Town	Built or Established	NRHP/NHL
1	Brand-Moore-Holmes House (Holmestead)	September 20, 2006	Marion vicinity	c. 1830	NRHP
2	Carlisle Hall (Kenworthy Hall)	December 15, 1989	Marion vicinity	1858–61	NHL
3	Cocke House	May 1980	Marion	Early 1830s	
4	Fairhope Plantation	December 19, 1991	Uniontown vicinity	1857–61	NRHP
5	Fikes Ferry Bridge	July 15, 1976	Marion vicinity	1904	
6	Fiquet-Perkins-Sturdivant-Moore House	February 6, 1978	Marion	1850s	
7	Gus Mitchell Store Site	August 27, 2020	Marion	c. 1920	
8	Lillie Grove Baptist Church and Cemetery	March 8, 2023	Marion	c. 1934	
9	Lincoln High School Gymnasium and Classroom Addition	September 29, 2005	Marion	1963	
10	Lockett-Martin House (Napoleon Lockett House)	July 7, 1980	Marion	Early 1840s	
11	Ocmulgee Baptist Church	March 10, 1978	Selma vicinity	1834	
12	Phillips Memorial Auditorium	February 19, 1988	Marion	1938–39	NRHP
13	Uniontown Post Office	November 23, 1976	Uniontown	Before 1861	
14	Zion United Methodist Church	October 17, 1980	Marion	c. 1819-1822; 1880	

== See also ==
- National Register of Historic Places listings in Alabama
- Properties on the Alabama Register of Landmarks and Heritage by county (Autauga–Choctaw)
- Properties on the Alabama Register of Landmarks and Heritage by county (Clarke–Dallas)
- Properties on the Alabama Register of Landmarks and Heritage by county (DeKalb–Jackson)
- Properties on the Alabama Register of Landmarks and Heritage by county (Jefferson–Macon)
- Properties on the Alabama Register of Landmarks and Heritage by county (Pickens–Winston)
