= Grace Episcopal Church (Mount Meigs, Alabama) =

Historic church in Alabama, United States

- U.S. National Register of Historic Places
- Alabama Register of Landmarks and Heritage
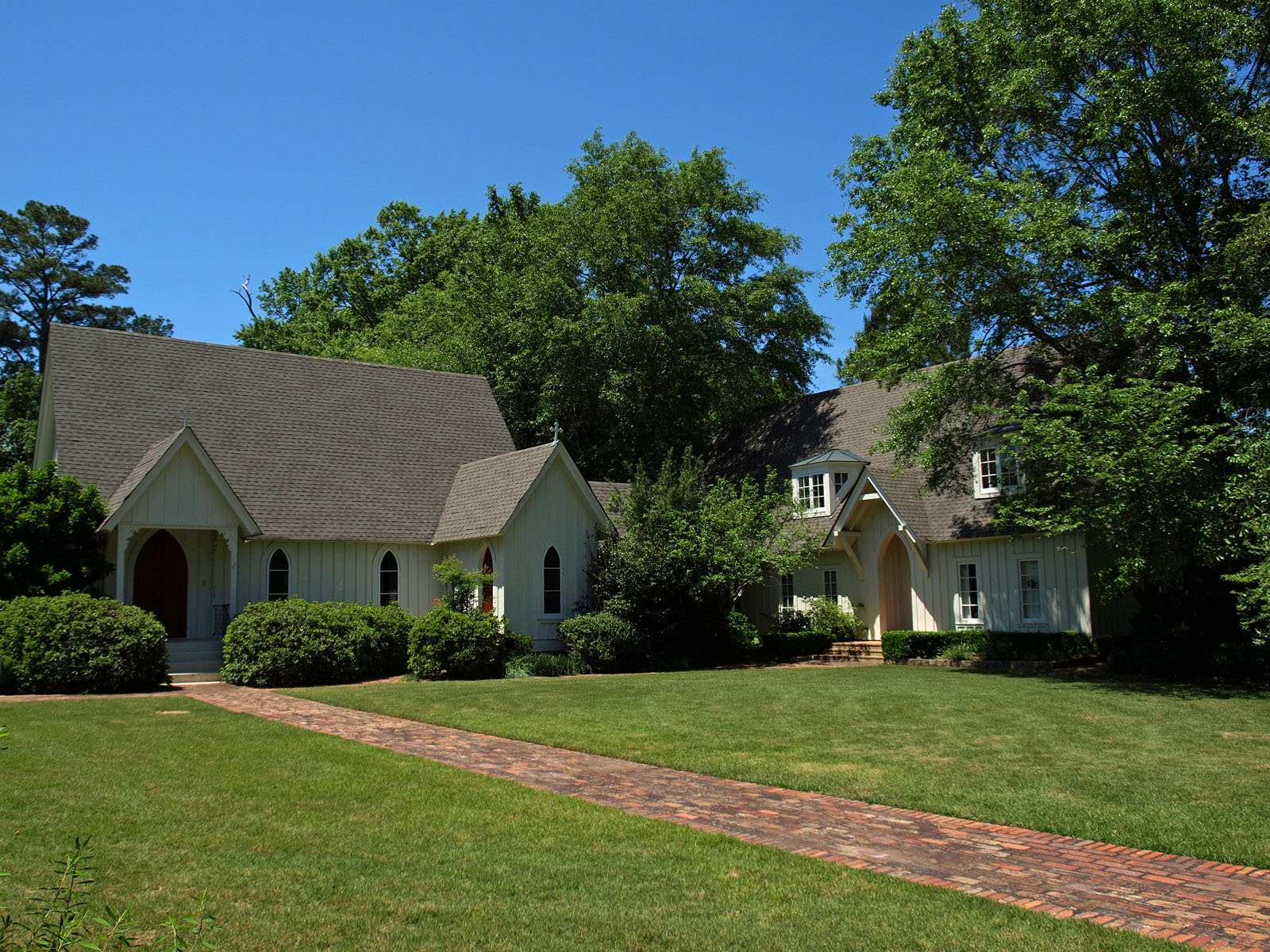
- Grace Episcopal in 2009

- Location within Alabama Location within the United States
- Location: Pike Rd., Mount Meigs, Alabama
- Coordinates: 32°21′18″N 86°5′51″W
- Area: 3.3 acres (1.3 ha)
- Built: 1892
- Architectural style: Gothic, Carpenter Gothic
- NRHP reference No.: 82002067

Significant dates
- Added to NRHP: February 19, 1982
- Designated ARLH: January 29, 1980

Grace Episcopal Church is a historic Episcopal church in Mount Meigs, Alabama. The Carpenter Gothic structure was built in 1892. The building was placed on the Alabama Register of Landmarks and Heritage on January 29, 1980, and the National Register of Historic Places on February 19, 1982.

== See also ==
- National Register of Historic Places listings in Montgomery County, Alabama
- Properties on the Alabama Register of Landmarks and Heritage in Montgomery County, Alabama
