= Winter Place =

Historic house in Alabama, United States

- U.S. National Register of Historic Places
- Alabama Register of Landmarks and Heritage
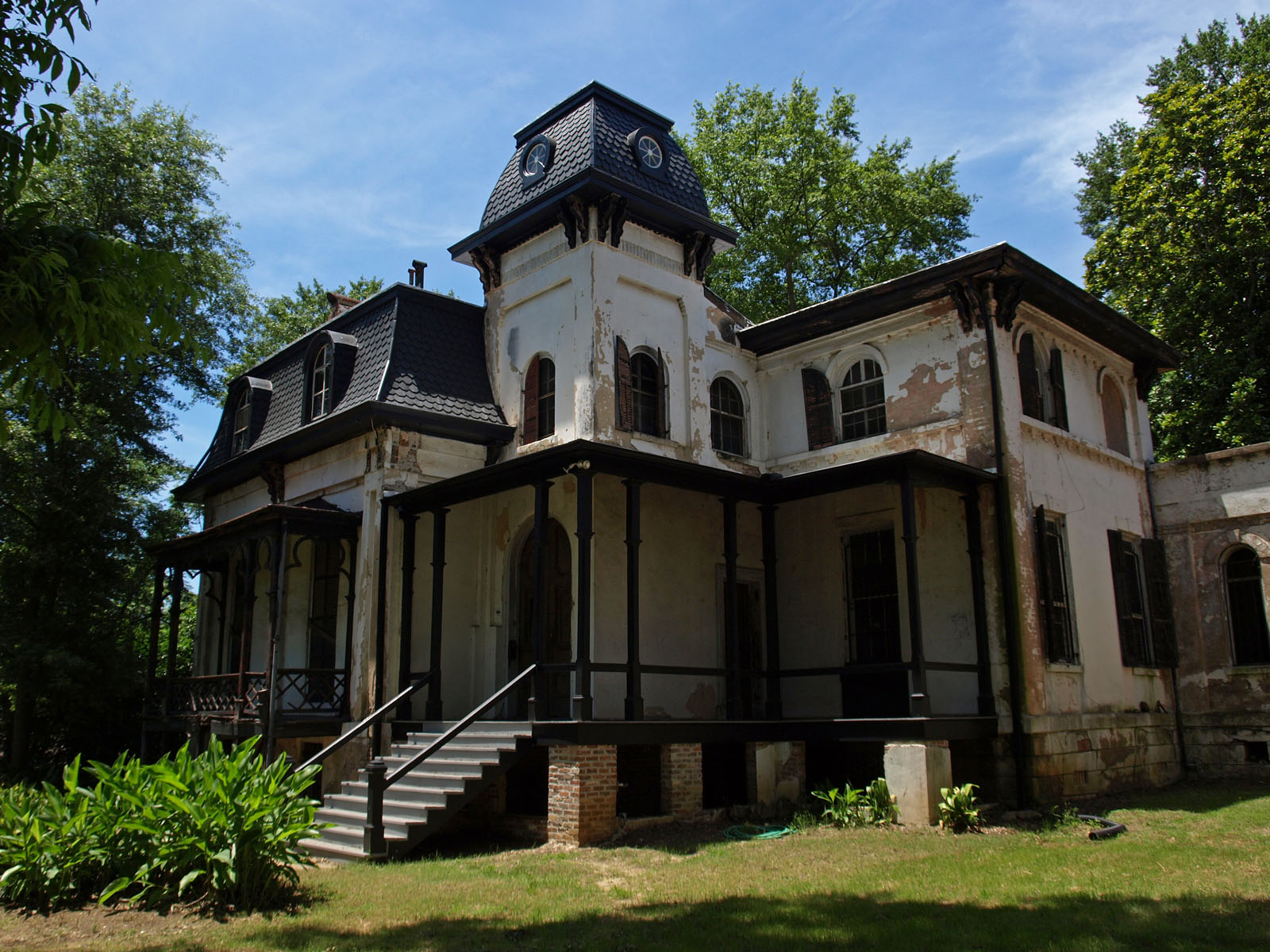
- The South House, undergoing restoration in 2009

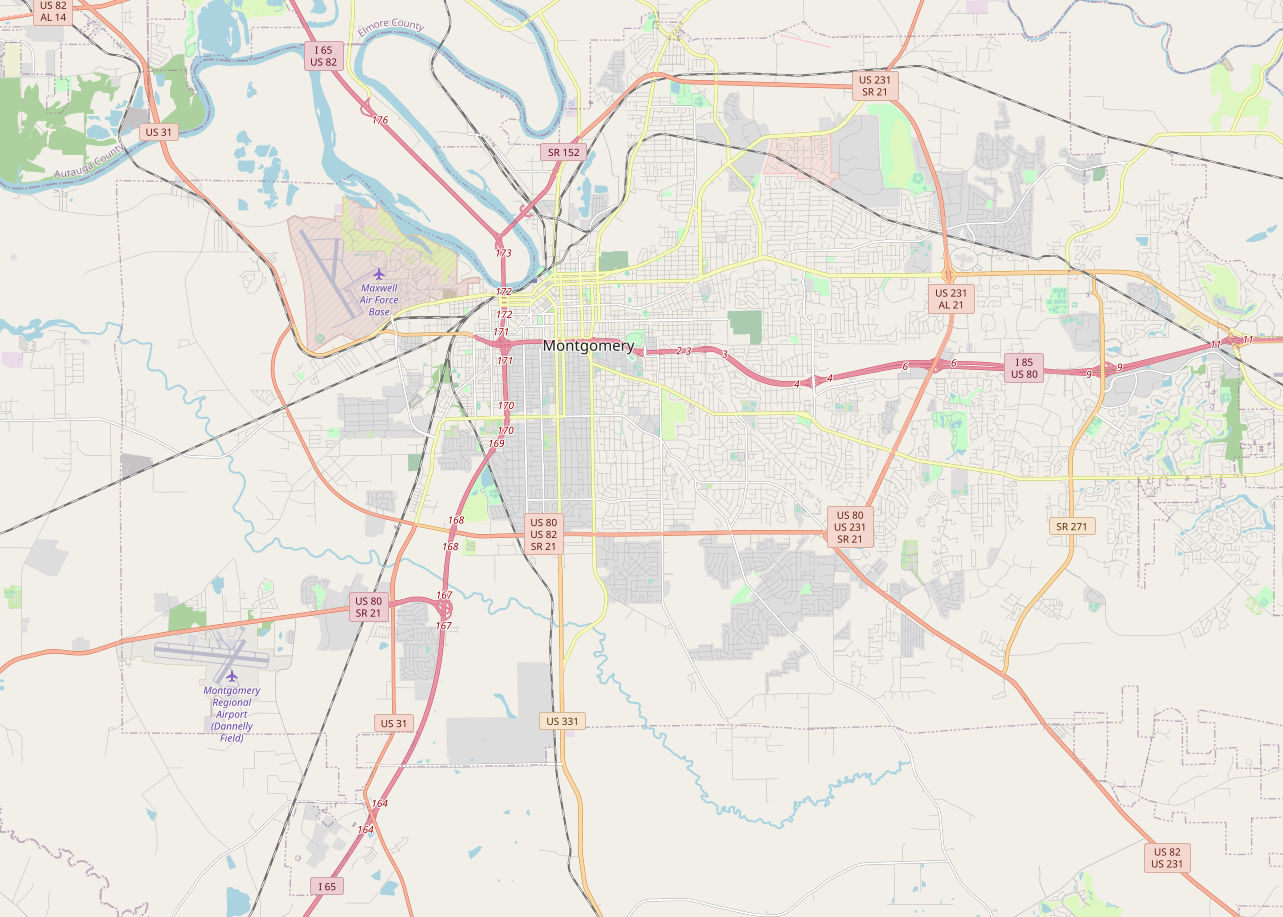
- Location within Montgomery, Alabama Location within Alabama Location within the United States
- Location: 454 South Goldwaite Street, Montgomery, Alabama
- Coordinates: 32°22′17″N 86°18′57″W
- Area: 1.5 acres (0.61 ha)
- Architectural style: Italianate, Second Empire
- NRHP reference No.: 06000439

Significant dates
- Added to NRHP: May 31, 2006
- Designated ARLH: September 29, 2005

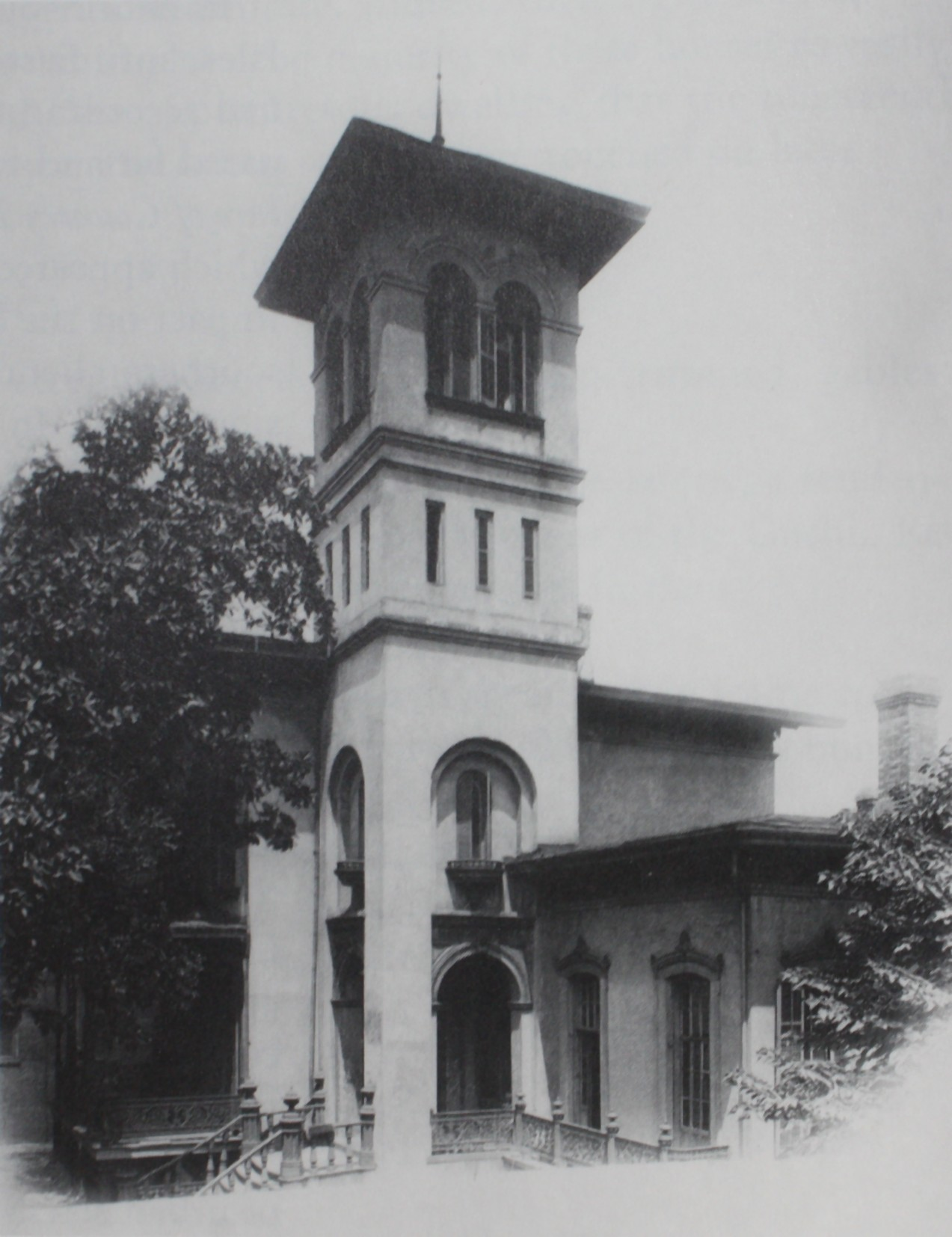
Joseph Winter's first home in Montgomery, designed by Samuel Sloan in 1851

Winter Place is a historic complex of two conjoined houses and three outbuildings in Montgomery, Alabama.

The buildings were constructed from the 1850s through the 1870s. The Italianate style North House was built in the 1850s and was the home of the Joseph S. Winter family. The Second Empire style South House was built in the 1870s and was the home of Winter's daughter, Sally Gindrat Winter Thorington, and her husband, Robert D. Thorington. Joseph S. Winter's first house in Montgomery was designed by Samuel Sloan in 1851 and it is believed by architectural historians that Sloan designed Winter Place as well. Following several decades of neglect, the property was placed on the Alabama Historical Commission's Places in Peril list in 2004. It was purchased in 2006 by Craig Drescher, who attempted to stabilize and restore the structures. The complex was added to the Alabama Register of Landmarks and Heritage on September 29, 2005, and to the National Register of Historic Places on May 31, 2006.

In 2018 the homes were sold to real-estate tycoon and bachelor philanthropist, Benjamin Blanchard who saw the property renovation, not only as an investment in restoring the luster of its historical significance, but as a deep contribution to the narrative of restoration and unity the Five Points neighborhood (home to Winter Place) is now undergoing. After decades of neglect and failed attempts by others to restore the home, Blanchard will successfully fully renovate the South House as his personal residence (pictured above) in the fall of 2020, and progressively renovate the North House in successive years to come.

== See also ==
- National Register of Historic Places listings in Montgomery County, Alabama
- Properties on the Alabama Register of Landmarks and Heritage in Montgomery County, Alabama
