= Jefferson Franklin Jackson House =

Historic house in Alabama, United States

- U.S. National Register of Historic Places
- Alabama Register of Landmarks and Heritage
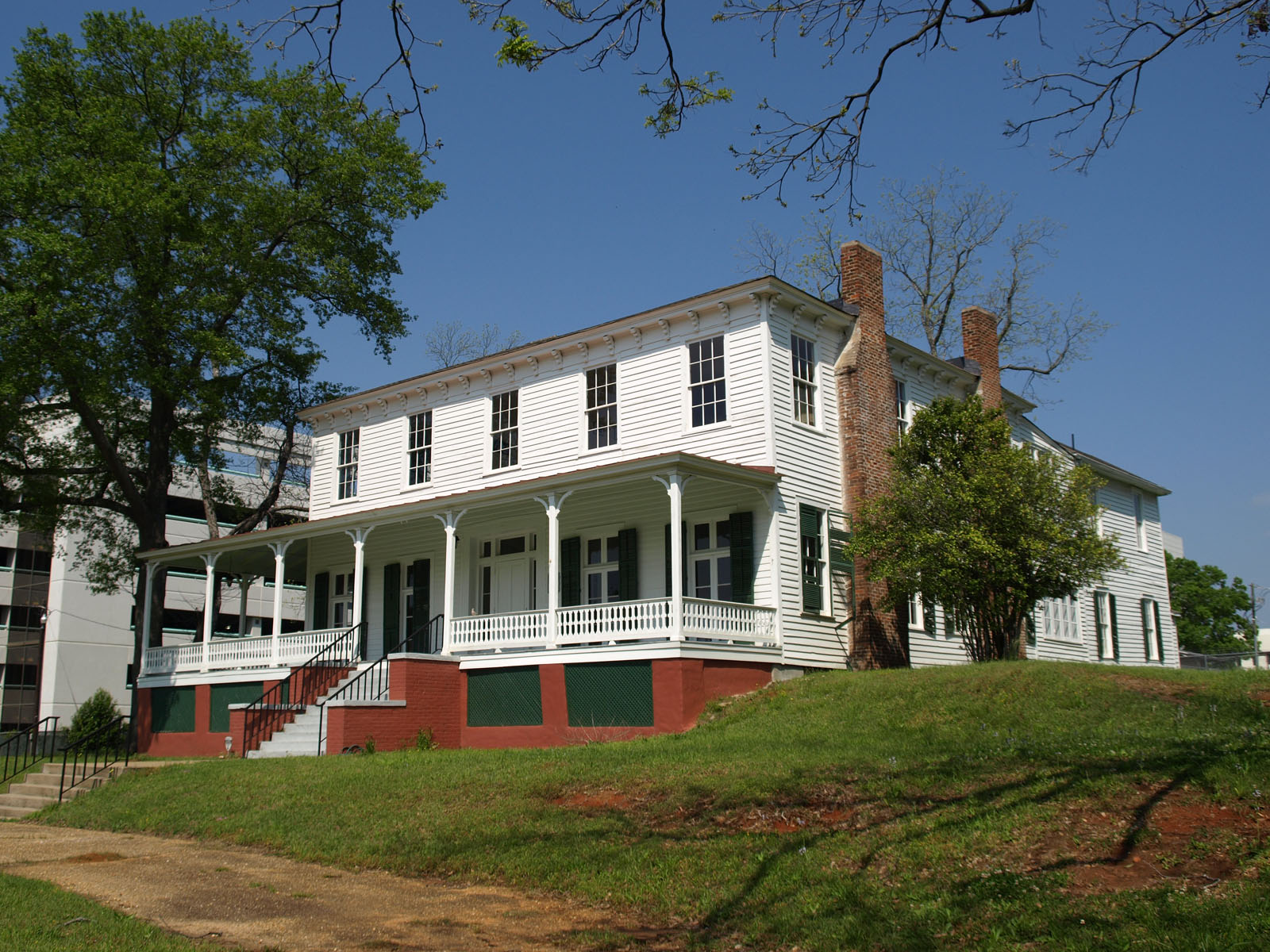
- The house in 2009

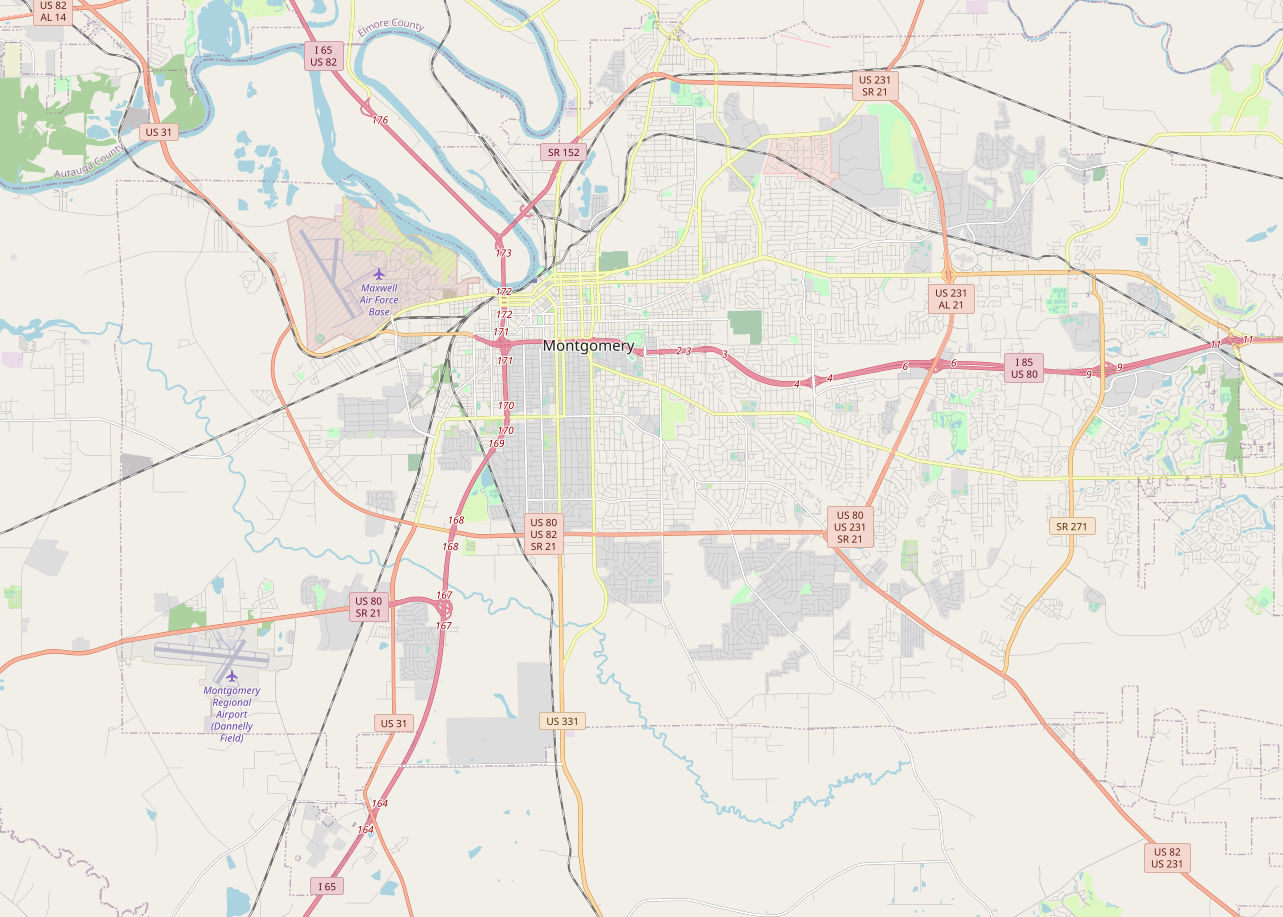
- Location within Montgomery, Alabama Location within Alabama Location within the United States
- Location: 409 S. Union St., Montgomery, Alabama
- Coordinates: 32°22′25″N 86°17′56″W
- Area: 1.4 acres (0.57 ha)
- Built: 1853
- NRHP reference No.: 84000711

Significant dates
- Added to NRHP: May 17, 1984
- Designated ARLH: July 21, 1978

The Jefferson Franklin Jackson House, commonly known as the Jackson-Community House, is a historic Italianate-style house in Montgomery, Alabama. It was added to the Alabama Register of Landmarks and Heritage on July 21, 1978, and to the National Register of Historic Places on May 17, 1984.

== History ==
The two-story frame house was built by Jefferson Franklin Jackson in 1853. Jackson served as a United States Attorney for northern and central Alabama. He died during the Civil War years. His wife subsequently remarried to Thomas H. Watts, Governor of Alabama from 1863 to 1865. Descendants of the family owned the house into the 20th century and it remained a residence until 1943.

The house was purchased in 1943 by the Montgomery City Federation of Colored Women's Clubs, an African American organization comprising twenty-five adult clubs and fifteen youth clubs, for use as a meeting place. The Montgomery City Federation had been formed in 1939 with a goal of promoting positive citizenship. The house became known as the Community House and was used as a Girl Scouts headquarters, a social and civic center, and, in December 1948, the first Montgomery library open to African Americans. Significantly, the house was used to host meetings of the Women's Political Council. They were the first group to officially call for a boycott of the racially segregated Montgomery bus system, leading to the Montgomery bus boycott.

== See also ==
- National Register of Historic Places listings in Montgomery County, Alabama
- Properties on the Alabama Register of Landmarks and Heritage in Montgomery County, Alabama
