= Brame House =

Historic house in Alabama, United States

- U.S. National Register of Historic Places
- Alabama Register of Landmarks and Heritage
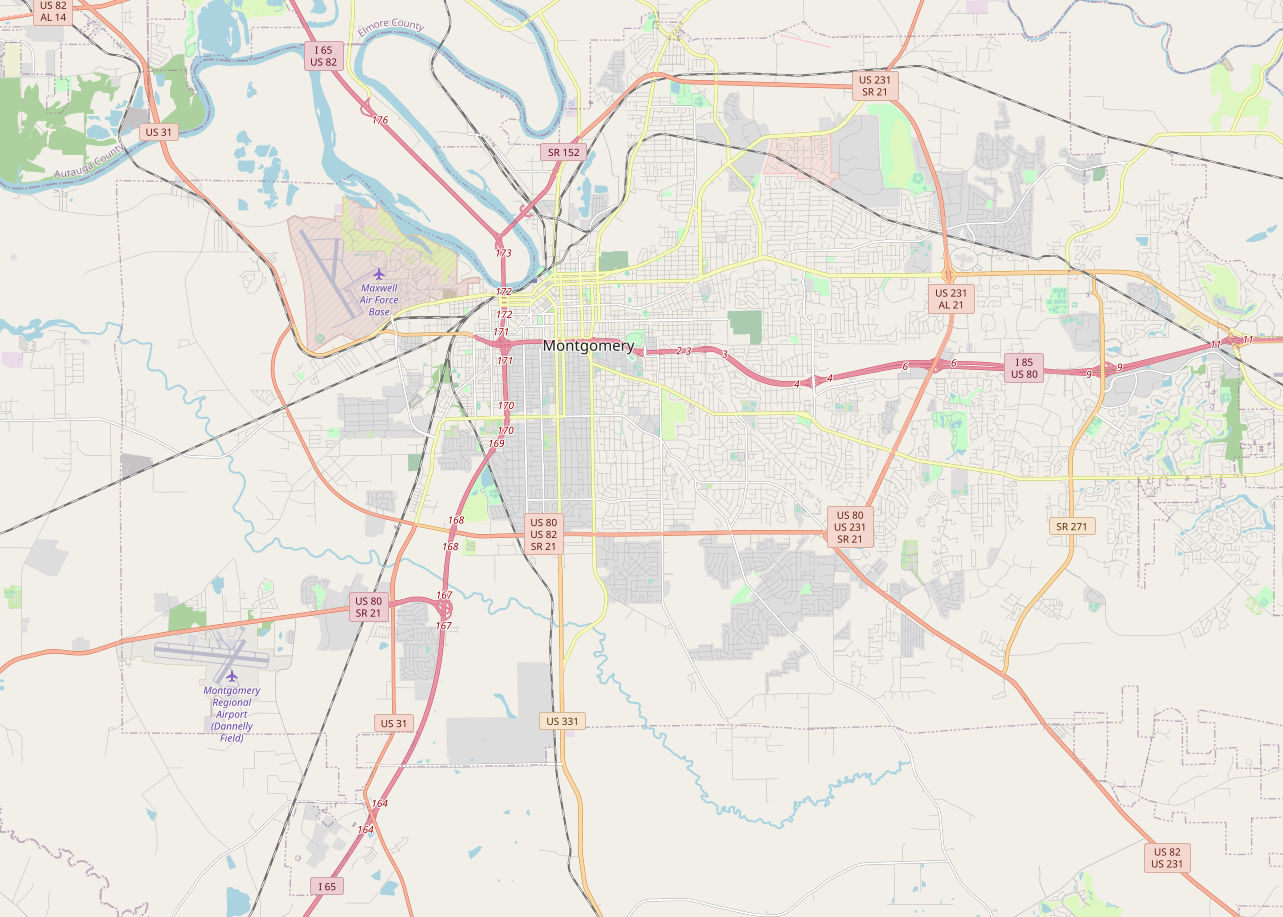
- Location within Montgomery, Alabama Location within Alabama Location within the United States
- Location: 402-404 S. Hull St., Montgomery, Alabama
- Coordinates: 32°22′24″N 86°18′14″W
- Area: less than one acre
- Built: 1897
- Architectural style: Classical Revival
- NRHP reference No.: 80000728

Significant dates
- Added to NRHP: September 17, 1980
- Designated ARLH: January 29, 1980

The Brame House, also known as the Brame-Cody-Neal House, was a historic Classical Revival-style house in Montgomery, Alabama. The two-story frame house was built in 1897 by W.W. Brame. It was added to the Alabama Register of Landmarks and Heritage on January 29, 1980, and to the National Register of Historic Places on September 17, 1980. The house was demolished in 1990, after some attempts were made to save it.

== See also ==
- National Register of Historic Places listings in Montgomery County, Alabama
- Properties on the Alabama Register of Landmarks and Heritage in Montgomery County, Alabama
