= Stone Plantation =

Historic house in Alabama, United States

- U.S. National Register of Historic Places
- Alabama Register of Landmarks and Heritage
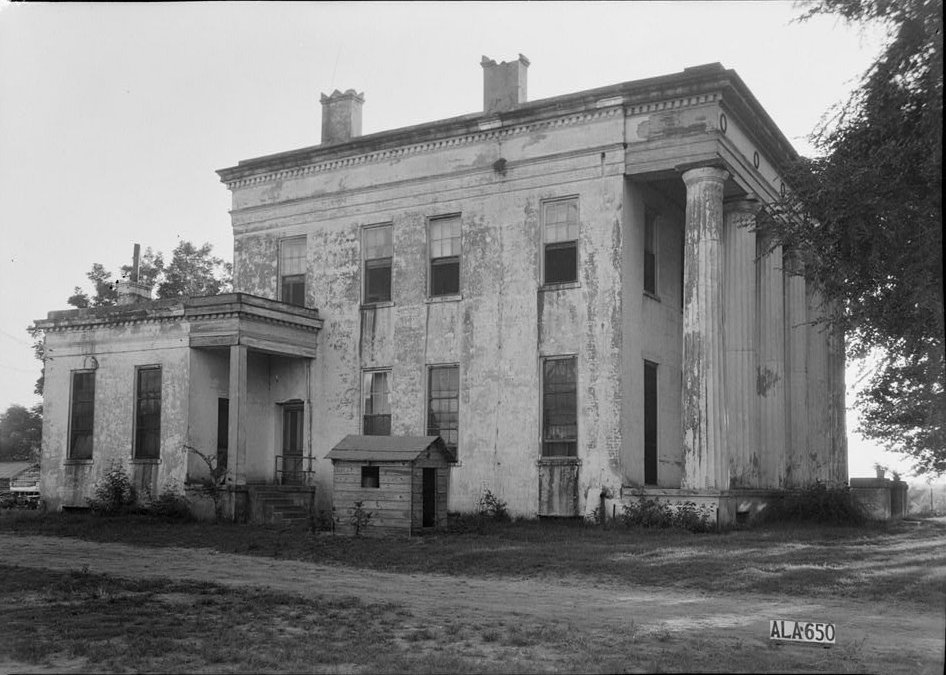
- Side view of the main house in 1937, prior to restoration

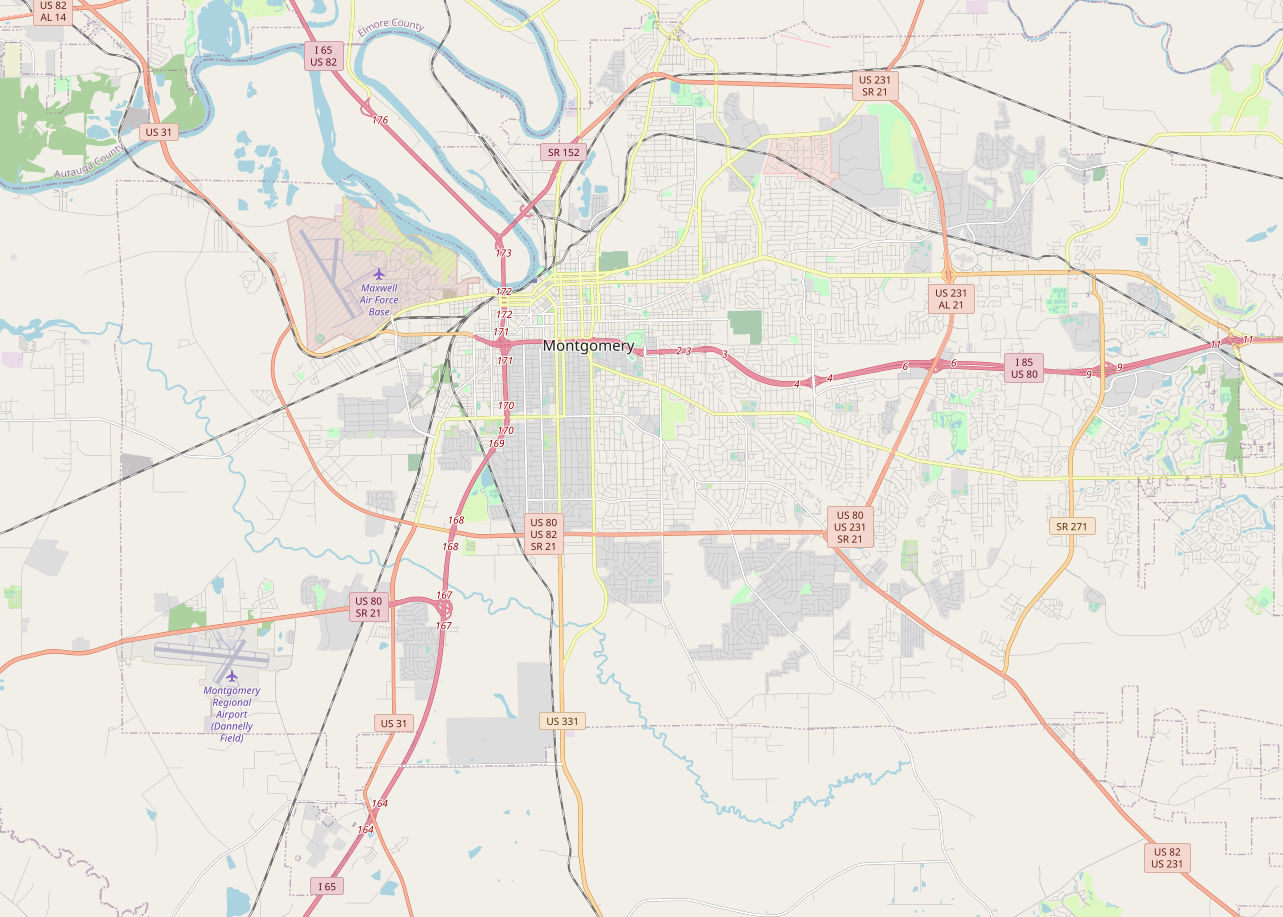
- Location within Montgomery, Alabama Location within Alabama Location within the United States
- Nearest city: Montgomery, Alabama
- Coordinates: 32°21′2″N 86°25′31″W
- Area: 2.8 acres (1.1 ha)
- Built: 1852
- Architect: Barton Warren Stone
- Architectural style: Greek Revival
- NRHP reference No.: 01001411

Significant dates
- Added to NRHP: December 31, 2001
- Designated ARLH: September 28, 2000

The Stone Plantation, also known as the Young Plantation and the Barton Warren Stone House, is a historic Greek Revival-style plantation house and one surviving outbuilding along the Old Selma Road on the outskirts of Montgomery, Alabama. It had been the site of a plantation complex, and prior to the American Civil War it was known for cotton production worked by enslaved people.

It was added to the Alabama Register of Landmarks and Heritage on September 28, 2000; and listed as one of the National Register of Historic Places for architecture on December 31, 2001.

== Early history and the Stone family ==
The Stone Plantation was built by Barton Warren Stone (March 24, 1800–January 14, 1884), the son of Warren Henley Stone of Poynton Manor in Charles County, Maryland and Martha Bedell of Alamance County, North Carolina. His parents established a plantation, "Magnolia Crest", in Lowndes County in the 1830s, and it still survives a few miles west of this plantation. Barton Stone's plantation house, known to his family simply as the "Home Place," was one of three plantation houses that he owned. His other two houses were "Duck Pond" and "Prairie Place."

By 1860, Stone owned 83 enslaved people, and 5,000 acres (2,000 ha) in Montgomery County, with an additional 2,000 acres (810 ha) in Autauga County. The Stone Plantation was known for cotton production, and contained one cotton gin. Barton Warren Stone died in 1884, he was survived two wives and all but one of his sons.

The property was acquired by L.C. Young in 1901, and then by Jesse D. Baggett in 1933.

== Architecture ==
The two-story brick masonry house, fronted by a monumental Doric hexastyle portico, was built circa 1852, for Barton Warren Stone. It was built in a Neoclassical Greek Revival style, with some influence by Italianate style. The grounds of the property included a fruit orchard, and mature camellias and azaleas. It retains the exterior smoke house.

== See also ==
- National Register of Historic Places listings in Montgomery County, Alabama
- Properties on the Alabama Register of Landmarks and Heritage in Montgomery County, Alabama
