= Cottage Hill Historic District =

Historic district in Alabama, United States

- U.S. National Register of Historic Places
- U.S. Historic district
- Alabama Register of Landmarks and Heritage
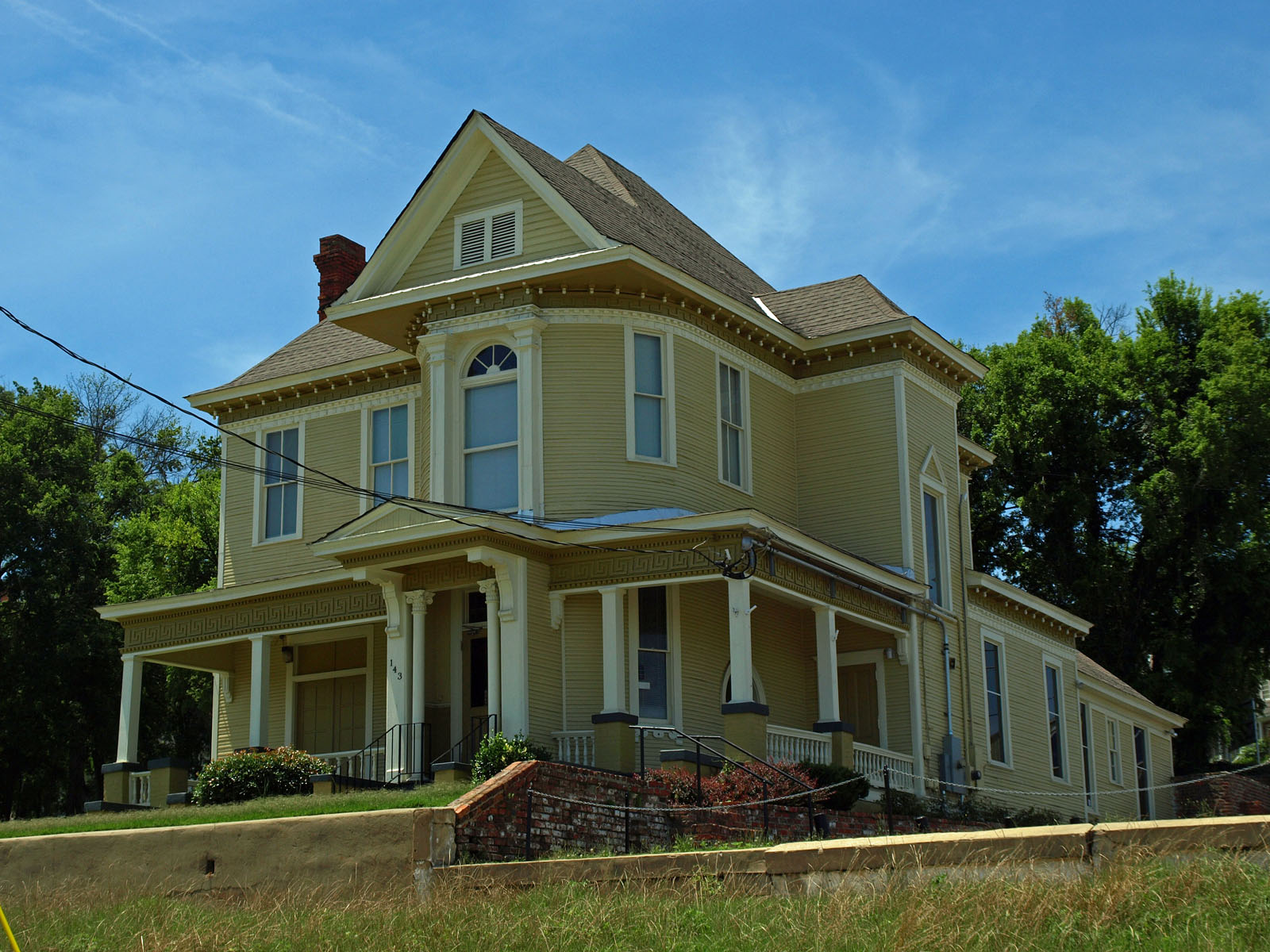
- House at 143 Wilkinson Street

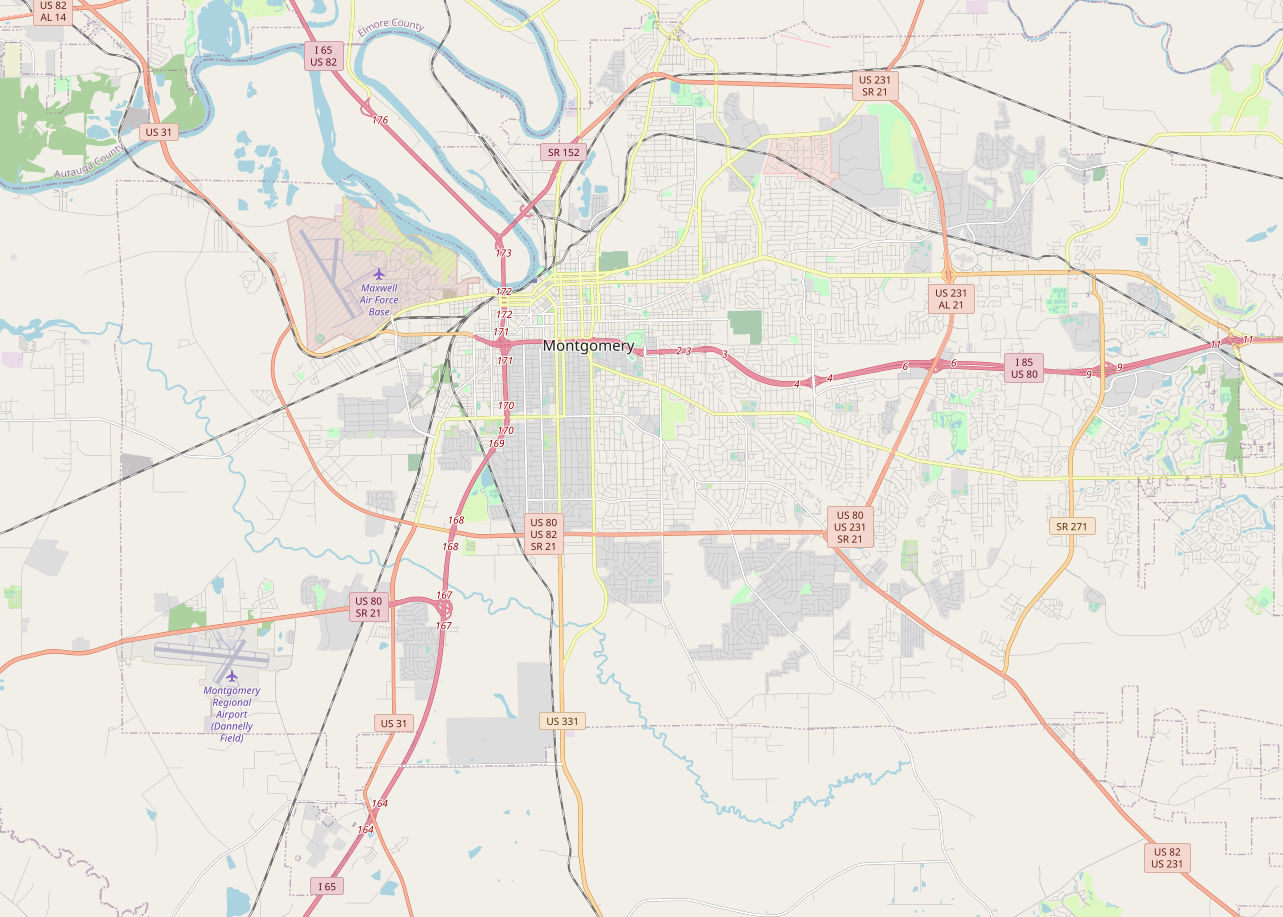
- Location within Montgomery, Alabama Location within Alabama Location within the United States
- Location: Roughly bounded by Goldthwaite, Maxwell, Holt, and Clayton Sts., Montgomery, Alabama
- Coordinates: 32°22′29″N 86°19′5″W
- Area: 42 acres (17 ha)
- Architect: Hugger, Robert; Unknown
- Architectural style: Late Victorian, Stick/Eastlake
- NRHP reference No.: 76000350

Significant dates
- Added to NRHP: November 7, 1976
- Designated ARLH: April 16, 1975

The Cottage Hill Historic District is a 42-acre (17 ha) historic district in Montgomery, Alabama. It is roughly bounded by Goldthwaite, Maxwell, Holt, and Clayton streets and contains 116 contributing buildings, the majority of them in the Queen Anne style. The district was placed on the Alabama Register of Landmarks and Heritage on April 16, 1975, and the National Register of Historic Places on November 7, 1976.

Architecture within the district
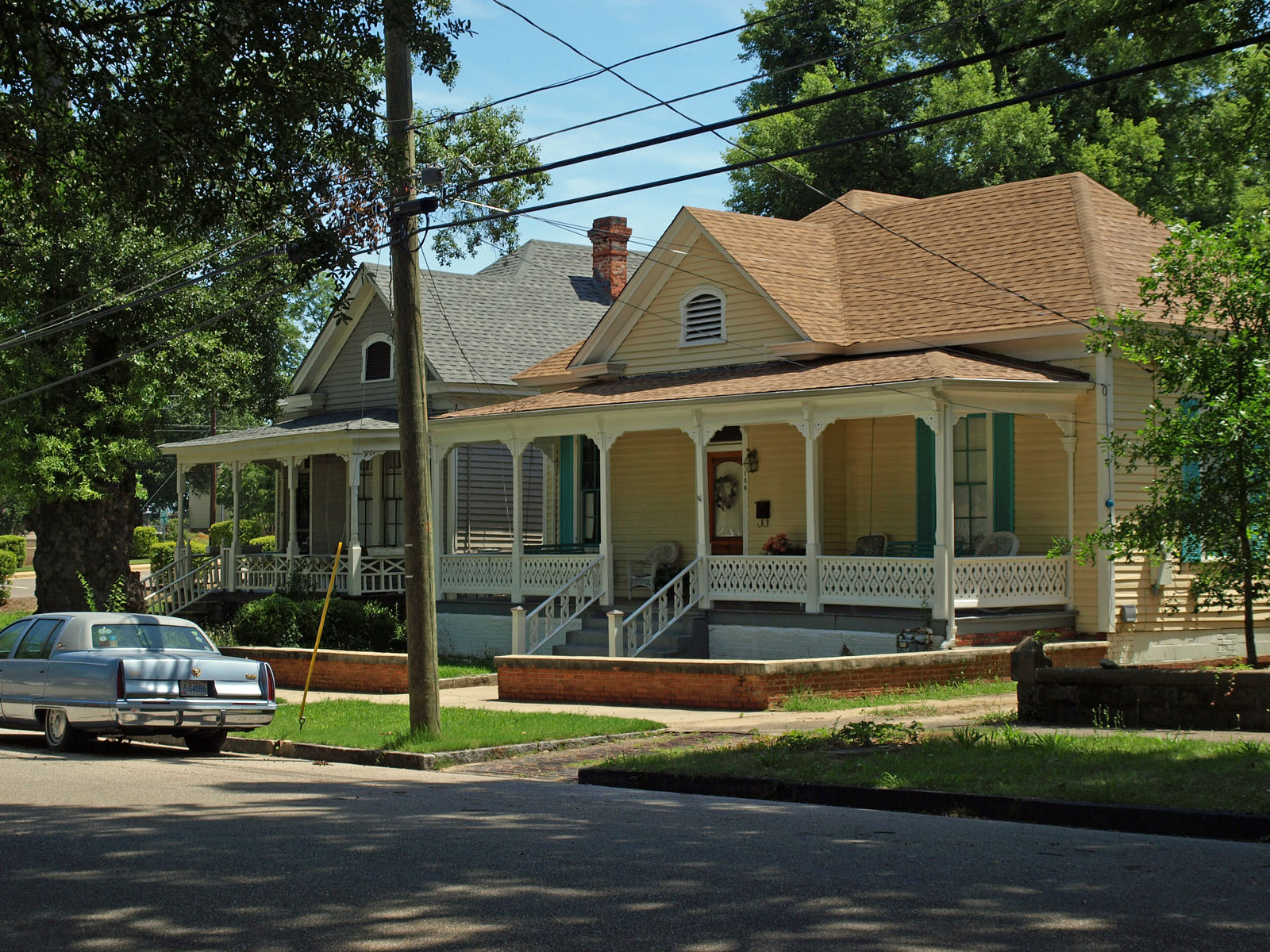
108 Whitman Street

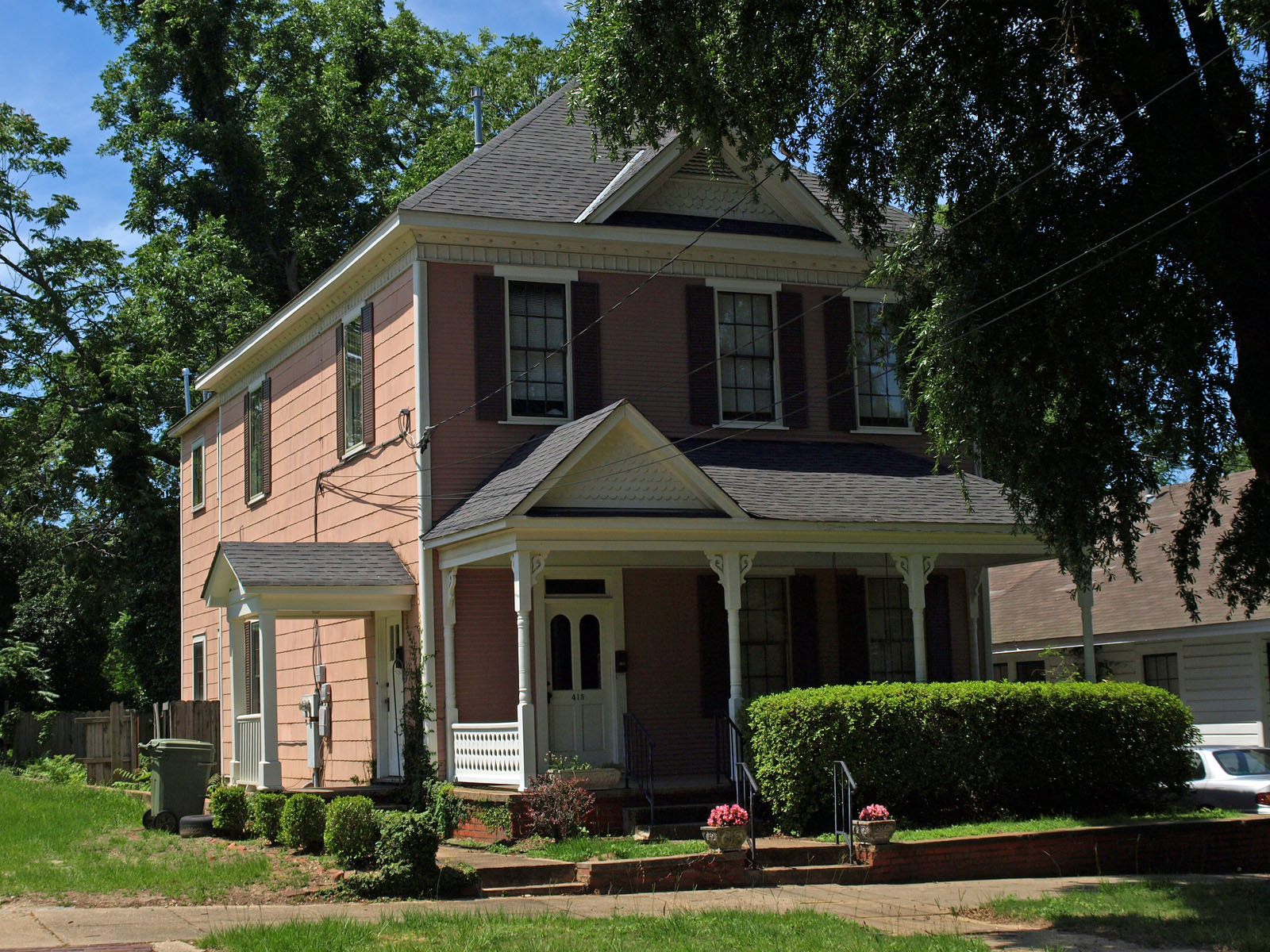
415 Martha Street

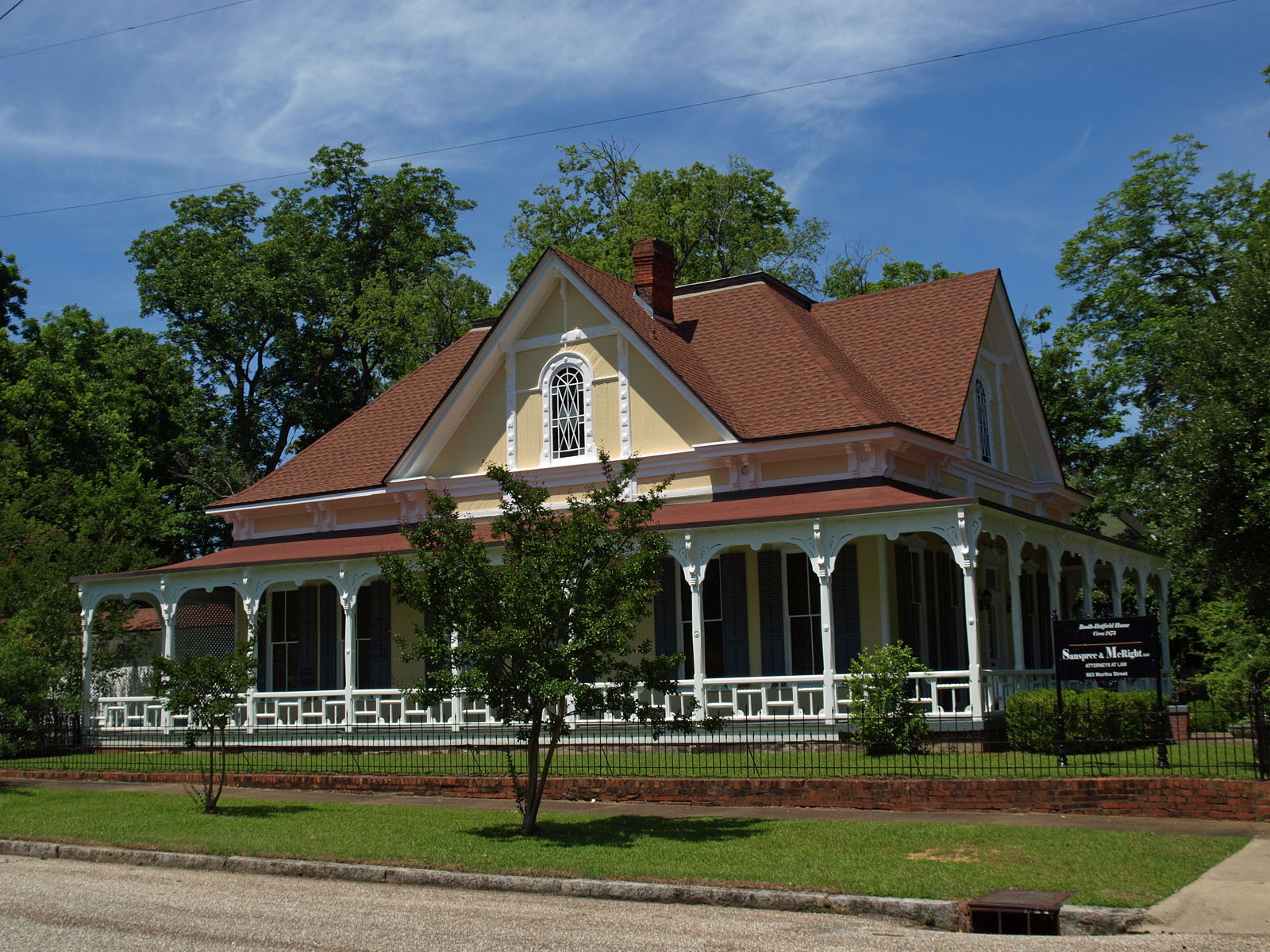
603 Martha Street

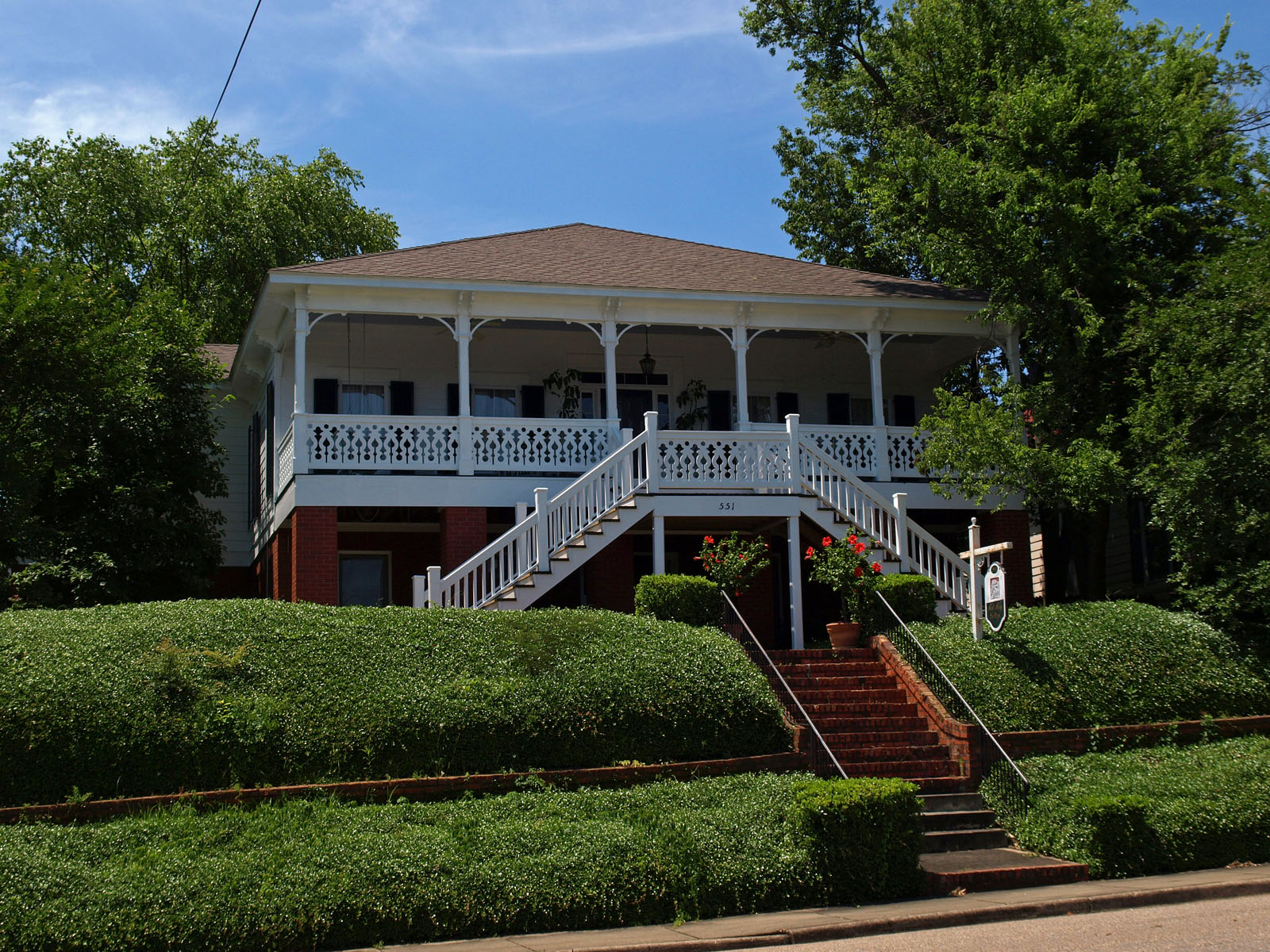
551 Clay Street

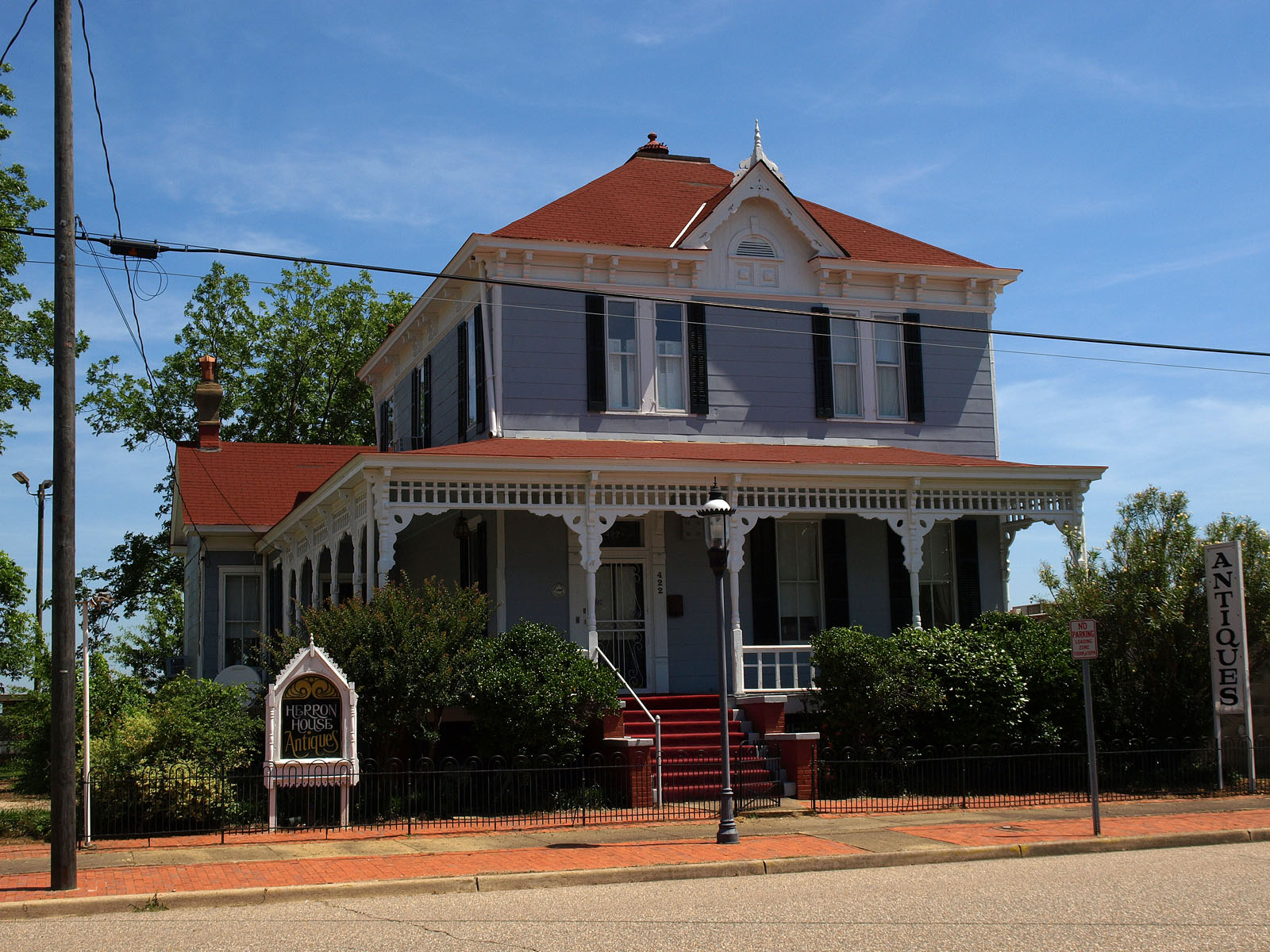
422 Herron Street

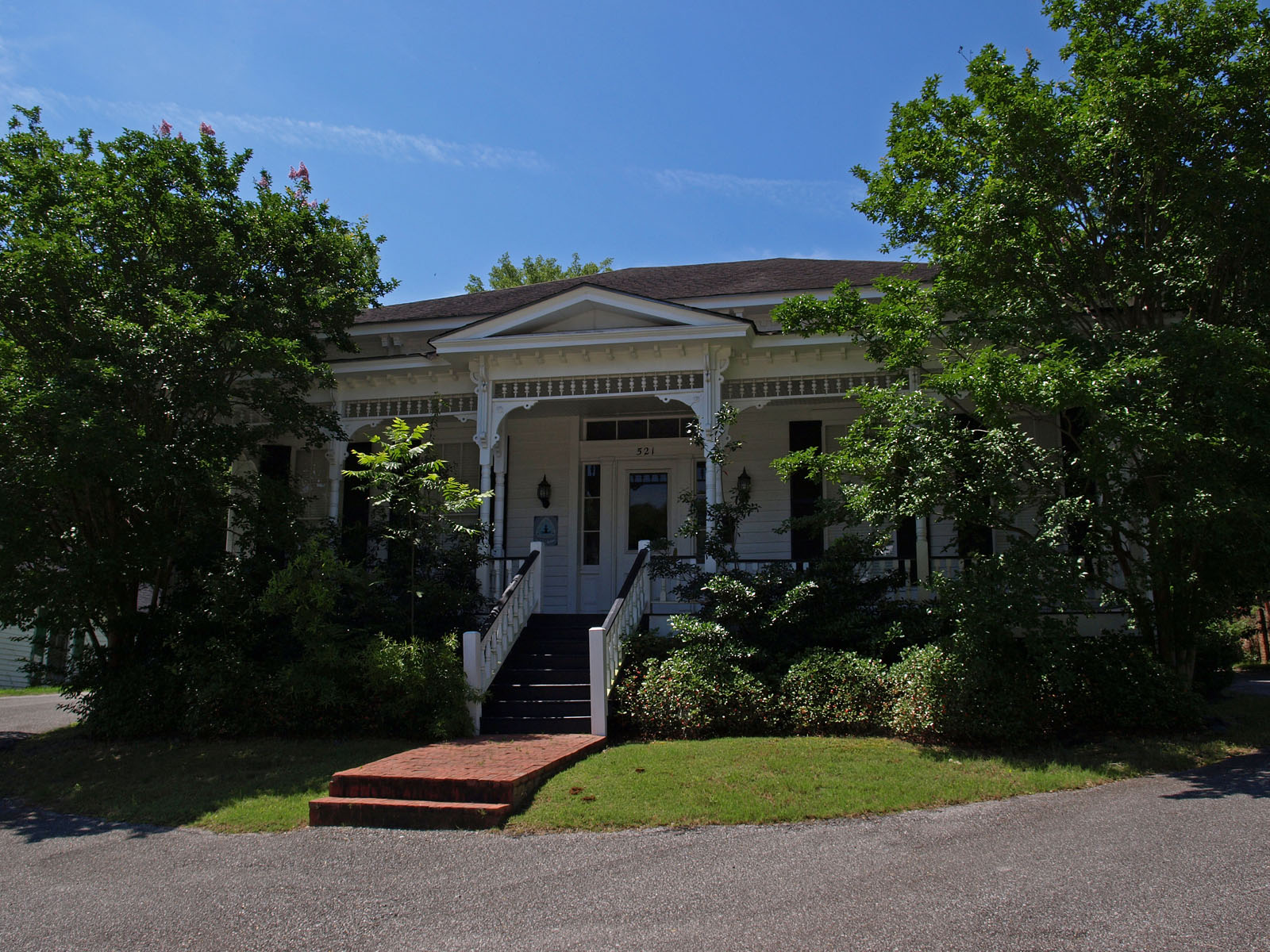
521 Herron Street

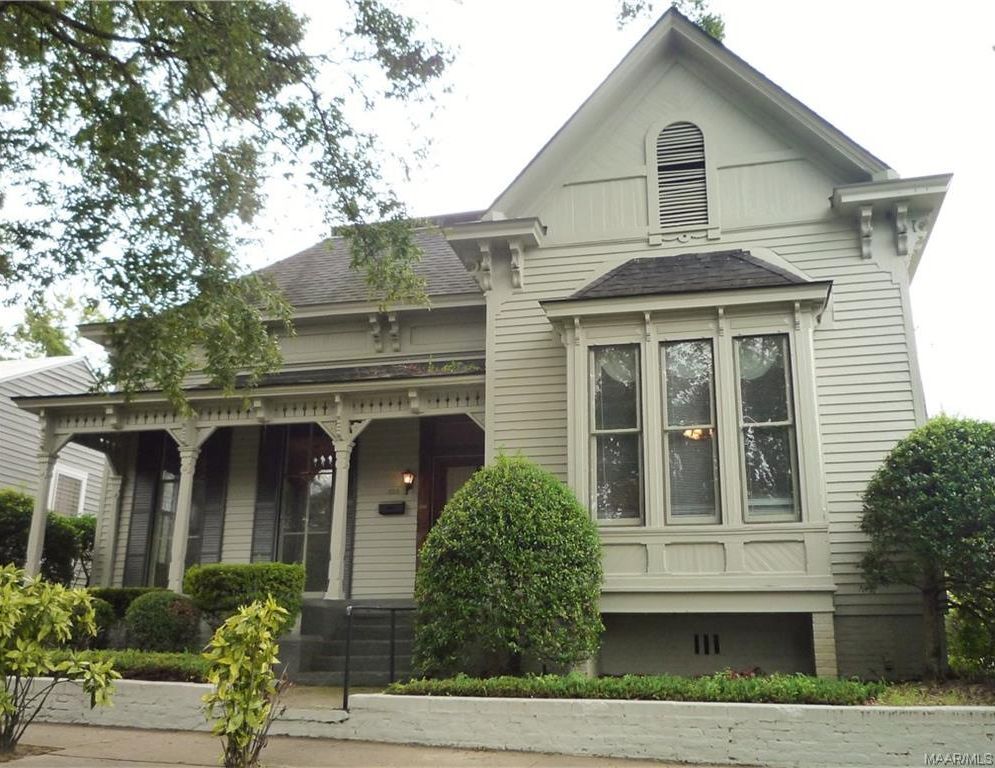
639 Martha Street

== See also ==
- National Register of Historic Places listings in Montgomery County, Alabama
- Properties on the Alabama Register of Landmarks and Heritage in Montgomery County, Alabama
