= Westview Plantation =

Historic house in Alabama, United States

- Westview
- U.S. National Register of Historic Places
- Alabama Register of Landmarks and Heritage
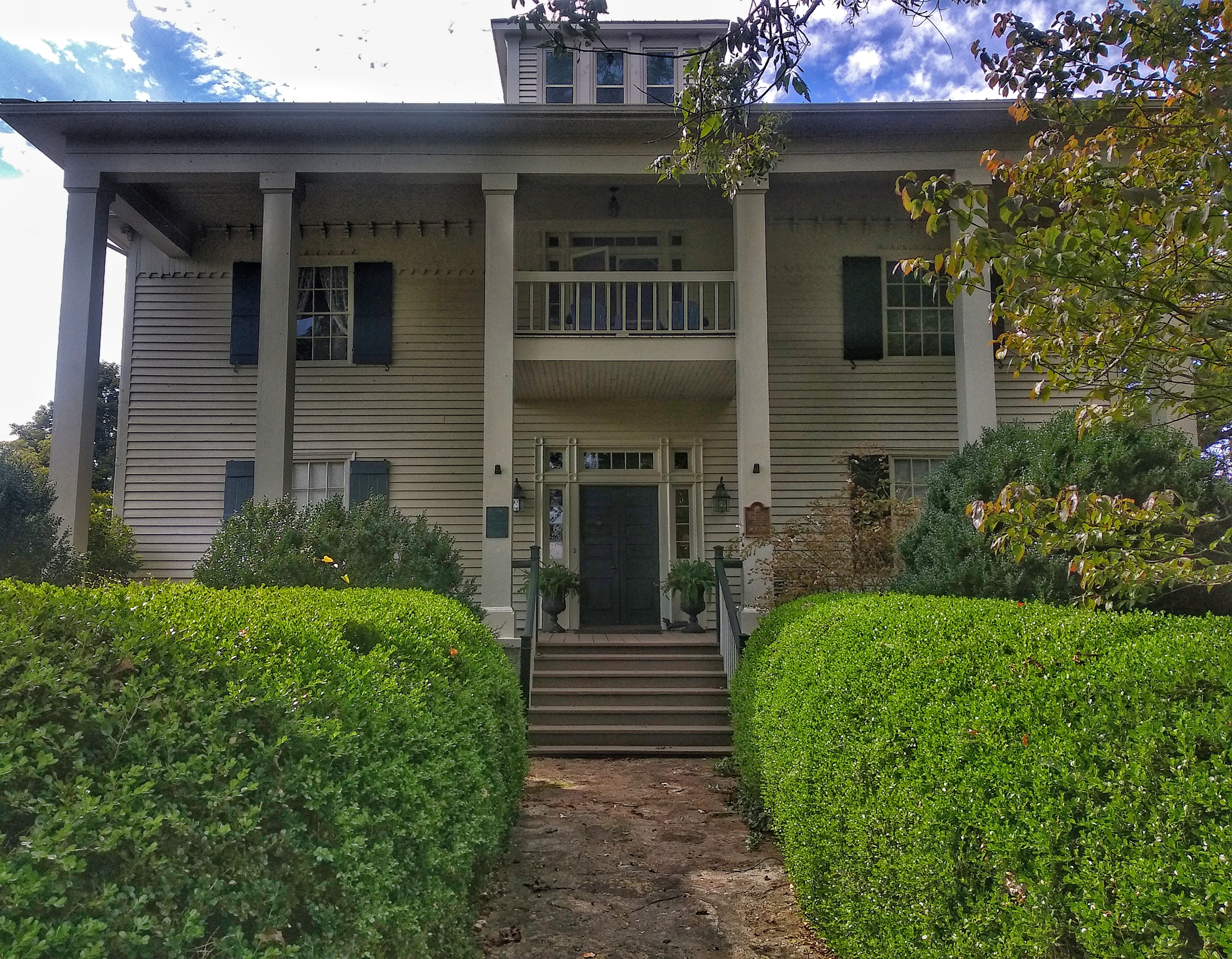

- Location within Alabama Location within the United States
- Nearest city: Decatur, Alabama
- Coordinates: 34°29′55″N 86°55′52″W
- Area: 12.9 acres (5.2 ha)
- Built: 1841
- NRHP reference No.: 82002068

Significant dates
- Added to NRHP: January 18, 1982
- Designated ARLH: October 19, 1979

Westview (also known as the Burleson House) is a historic residence near Decatur, Alabama. The plantation house was built in 1841 by Jonathan Adair Burleson (1789 - 1866), a Kentucky native who fought in the War of 1812 and settled in Alabama in 1818. Burleson became a large owner of land and enslaved people in Morgan County, Alabama.

Burleson was married twice to Elizabeth Byrd and Ann Roby Humphreys and had fourteen children, twelve of whom lived to adulthood. One of his sons, Rufus Columbus Burleson, moved to Texas and was an early president of Baylor University. Westview was the site of a Union Army camp during the Civil War. After Burleson's death in 1866, much of his land was sold, but the 2,600 acres (1,050 ha) surrounding the house remained in the family.

The two-story clapboard structure has a double-height font portico with a second-story balcony. The house has a central hall on each floor with two rooms on either side, and a kitchen wing off the southwest rear that was added around 1912. The house was added to the National Register of Historic Places in 1982.
