= Buena Vista, Alabama =

- Historic structures in Buena Vista

- Location within Alabama Location within the United States
- Coordinates: 31°47′34″N 87°15′34″W
- Country: United States
- State: Alabama
- County: Monroe
- Elevation: 203 ft (62 m)
- Time zone: UTC-6 (Central (CST))
  - Summer (DST): UTC-5 (CDT)
- Area code: 251
- Website

Alabama Register of Landmarks and Heritage
- Official name: Village of Buena Vista
- Designated: April 14, 1978

Buena Vista is an unincorporated community in Monroe County, Alabama. The village of Buena Vista is listed on the Alabama Register of Landmarks and Heritage. Additionally, it has one other site listed, the Concord Baptist Church.
