= Jude–Crutcher House =

Historic house in Alabama, United States

- George Jude House
- U.S. National Register of Historic Places
- Alabama Register of Landmarks and Heritage
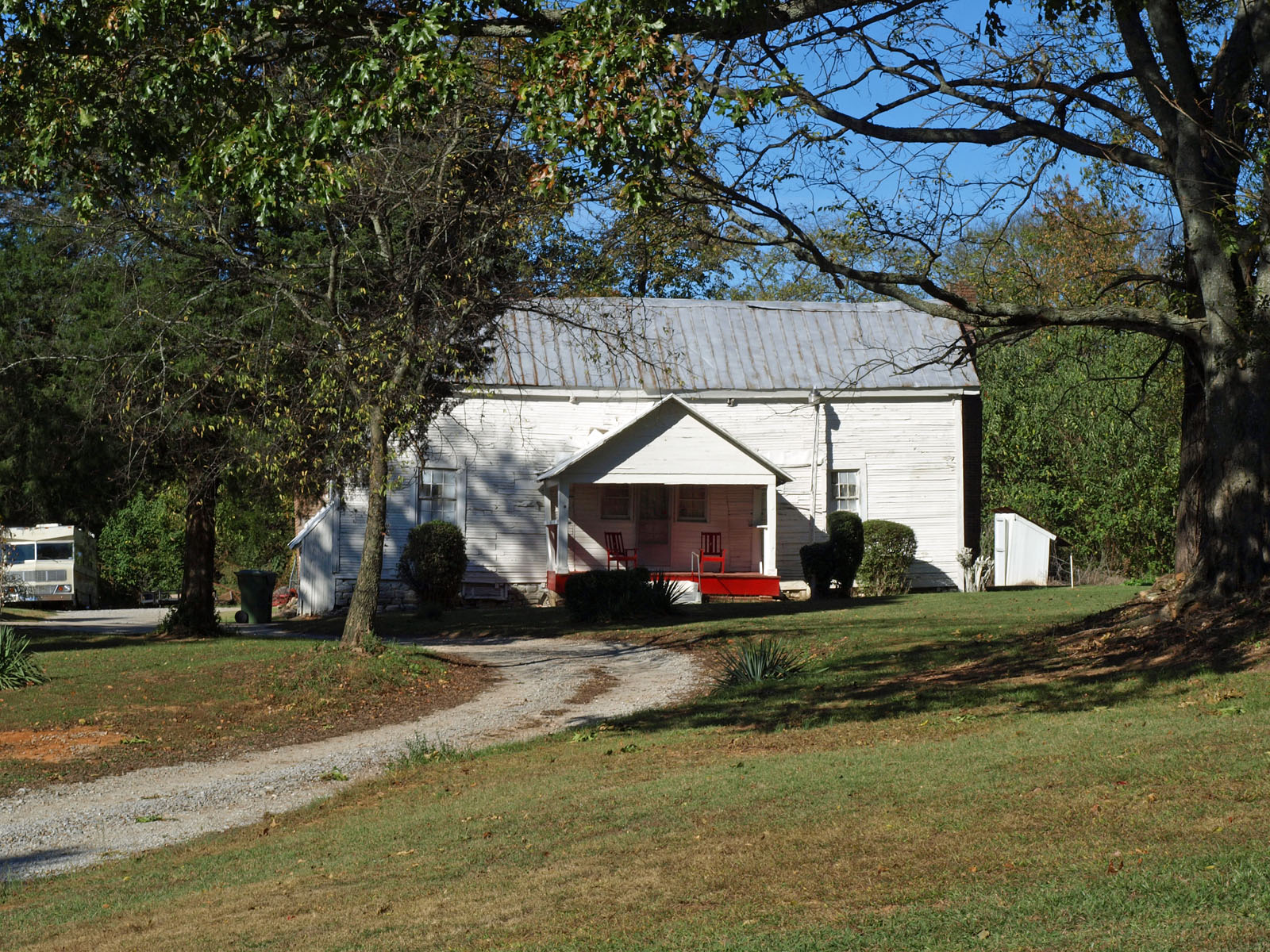
- The house in October 2011

- Location within Huntsville, Alabama Location within Alabama Location within the United States
- Location: 2132 Winchester Rd., Huntsville, Alabama
- Coordinates: 34°47′37″N 86°35′12″W
- Area: 0.5 acres (0.20 ha)
- Built: c.1812
- Architectural style: Dogtrot
- NRHP reference No.: 00000139

Significant dates
- Added to NRHP: February 24, 2000
- Designated ARLH: May 19, 1999

The Jude–Crutcher House (also known as the George Jude House and the David and Lucy Crutcher House) is a historic plantation house in Huntsville, Alabama. The house was built circa 1812 on land deeded that year to Samuel Echols. Echols sold 54 acres and the house to George Jude, Sr., in 1817. Jude died two years later, leaving the land to his son, George Jr. The younger Jude eventually acquired 800 acres (325 ha) and owned 31 slaves. Upon his death in 1873, the land stayed in the family until 1883. In 1906 David Crutcher, who had been born a slave on an adjacent plantation in 1851, purchased the house and 154 acres (62 ha) along with two other African-American men. The Crutchers operated a successful farm on their portion of the land, which was an extension farm for Alabama A&M University until the 1940s. Only 7% of African-American farmers in Madison County in 1910 owned their own farms. David died in 1924, and his wife, Lucy, died in 1943, although the house and land is still in the family.

The house is a 1 1/2-story dogtrot structure, although the central breezeway was enclosed in the mid-20th century. A plain gabled porch was added at the same time, and shelters the modern front door and a pair of two-over-two sash windows. Six-over-six windows of different sizes sit on either side of the porch, and the façade is clad in clapboards. The metal gable roof has chimneys in each gable end. The interior is of the typical dogtrot layout of two rooms flanking the now-enclosed central hall. A rear shed roofed addition was built to house a bathroom and kitchen.

The house was listed on the Alabama Register of Landmarks and Heritage in 1999 and the National Register of Historic Places in 2000.
