= Flint River Place =

Historic house in Alabama, United States

- U.S. National Register of Historic Places
- Alabama Register of Landmarks and Heritage
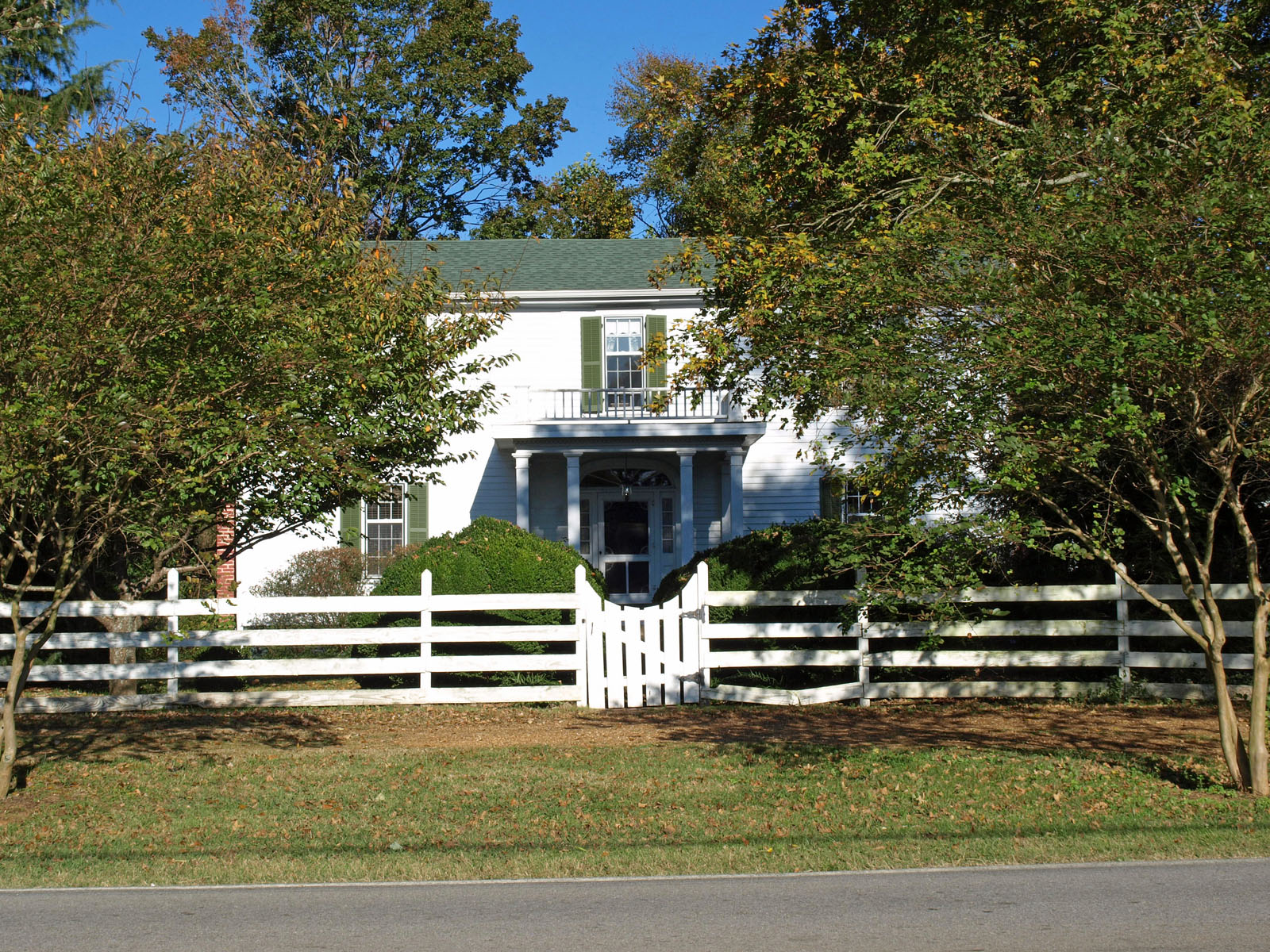
- The house in October 2011

- Location within Alabama Location within the United States
- Nearest city: Huntsville, Alabama
- Coordinates: 34°47′1″N 86°29′37″W
- Area: 10 acres (4.0 ha)
- Built: 1844
- Architect: Daniel B. Friend
- Architectural style: Greek Revival, Georgian, Federal
- NRHP reference No.: 82002050

Significant dates
- Added to NRHP: January 18, 1982
- Designated ARLH: October 1, 1981

Flint River Place (also known as the Moore-Jordan-Busbin Mansion) is a historic residence near Huntsville, Alabama. The house was built between 1844 and 1850 by Daniel Friend, a planter who came to Alabama from Kentucky around 1826. The house is Greek Revival in style, with Federal and Georgian Revival elements. It began as an L-shaped house, with an additional ell and one-story shed roofed infill built in 1930. The house is clad in poplar siding and the gable roof was originally slate over wooden shingles, but has been replaced by asphalt shingles. Two gable-end chimneys have simple, Federal-style mantels. The façade is three bays, with a one-story portico supported by four columns, with a balcony above; it replaced a gable-roofed, two-column portico in 1978. The main entrance is flanked by sidelights and topped with a fanlight. Windows on the entire house, except for the southeast bedroom addition, are six-over-nine sashes. The house was listed on the Alabama Register of Landmarks and Heritage in 1981 and National Register of Historic Places in 1982. The house was heavily damaged in a fire in 2012.
