= Le Grand, Alabama =

- Unincorporated community
- Location within Alabama Location within the United States
- Coordinates: 32°09′45″N 86°16′07″W
- Country: United States
- State: Alabama
- County: Montgomery
- Elevation: 262 ft (80 m)
- Time zone: UTC-6 (Central (CST))
  - Summer (DST): UTC-5 (CDT)
- Area code: 334
- GNIS feature ID: 152006

Le Grand, also spelled as Legrand, is an unincorporated community in Montgomery County, Alabama, United States. Le Grand is located on U.S. Route 331, 15.8 miles (25.4 km) south of Montgomery. A post office operated under the name Legrand from 1883 to 1916.

Providence Presbyterian Church, which is located in Le Grand, is listed on the Alabama Register of Landmarks and Heritage.
