= Ford–Countess House =

Historic house in Alabama, United States

- Hezekiah Ford House
- U.S. National Register of Historic Places
- Alabama Register of Landmarks and Heritage
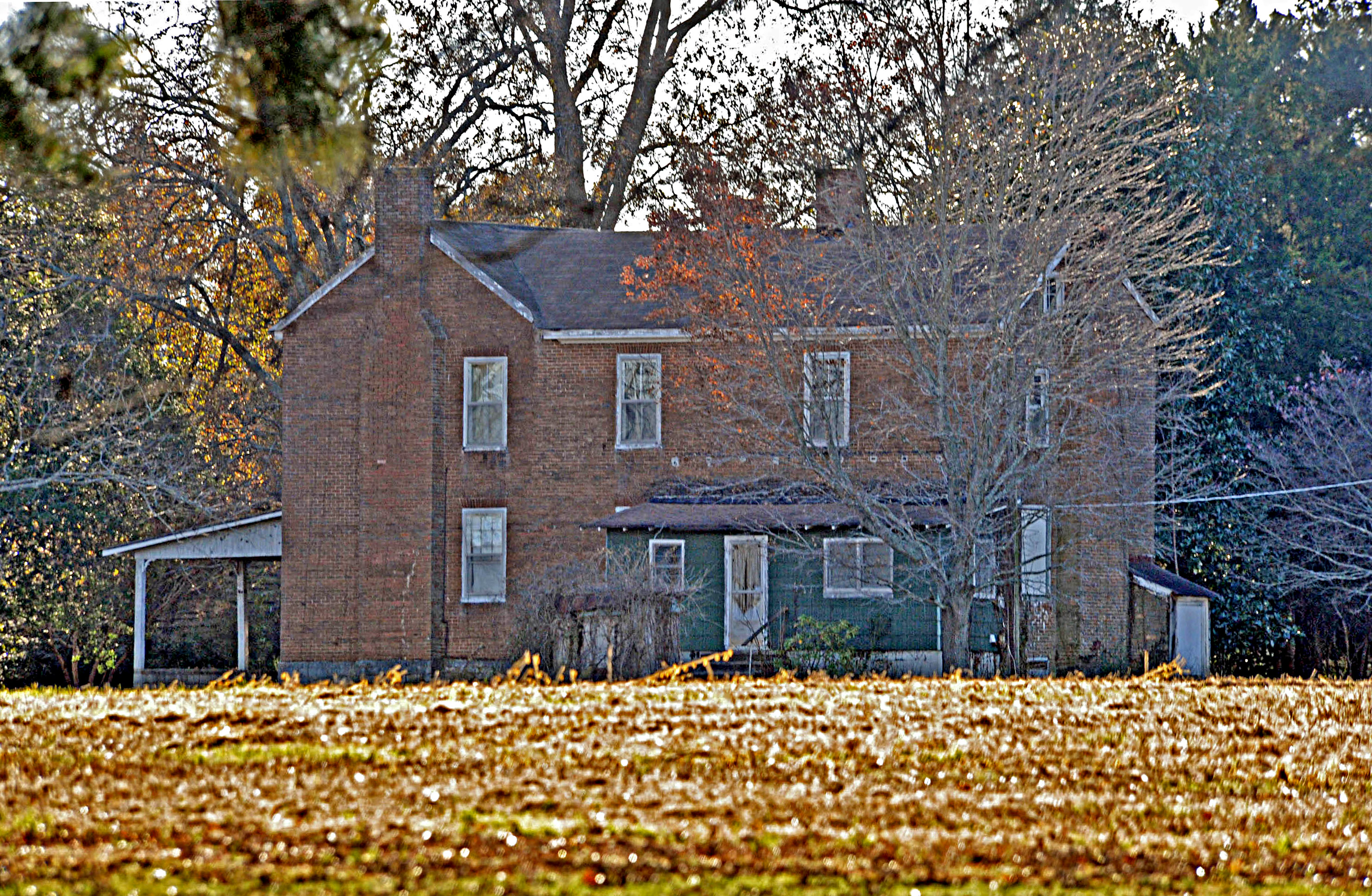
- The house in May 2008

- Location within Alabama Location within the United States
- Location: 920 Countess Rd., Huntsville, Alabama
- Coordinates: 34°49′13″N 86°32′56″W
- Built: c.1820
- Architectural style: I-House, Federal
- NRHP reference No.: 14000318

Significant dates
- Added to NRHP: June 13, 2014
- Designated ARLH: October 31, 2013

The Ford–Countess House (also known as the Hezekiah Ford House) is a historic residence near Huntsville in Madison County, Alabama. Hezekiah Ford came to Madison County from Cumberland County, Virginia, in 1813, and began purchasing land on which to build a cotton plantation. He acquired the land on which the house stands in 1820, and built the two-story, brick I-house soon after. Ford died in 1839, and the land was owned by his wife, Nancy, until her death in 1844. Hezekiah's brother, John, then assumed ownership, and the plantation stayed in his family until 1904. It reached a peak of 280 acres (113 ha), and the family owned 69 slaves in 1860. James W. Burcum owned the property from 1904 until 1911, when it was sold to Stephen H. Countess of Tuscaloosa. The Countess family still owns and farms the land, although the house has not been occupied since 1995.

The plantation house is a two-story, brick I-house with Federal details. A one-room wing off the northeast rear of the house was enlarged circa 1845 with the addition of a second room and second story. The main block has a gable roof with chimneys in each gable end. The front façade has a full-width, shed roof supported square posts with Victorian brackets which originally covered a porch; a small side stair and platform in front of the twin front doors currently occupy the space. Most of the windows on the house are two-over-two sash windows, although the first floor façade originally had twelve-over-twelve windows. The main block interior consists of two rooms on each floor, with Federal fireplace mantels in each room. The rear ell is also divided into two rooms on each floor, although a stair hall has been partitioned off from the southern room on the second floor.

The house was listed on the National Register of Historic Places in 2014.
