= William Madison Otey House =

Historic house in Alabama, United States

- U.S. National Register of Historic Places
- Alabama Register of Landmarks and Heritage
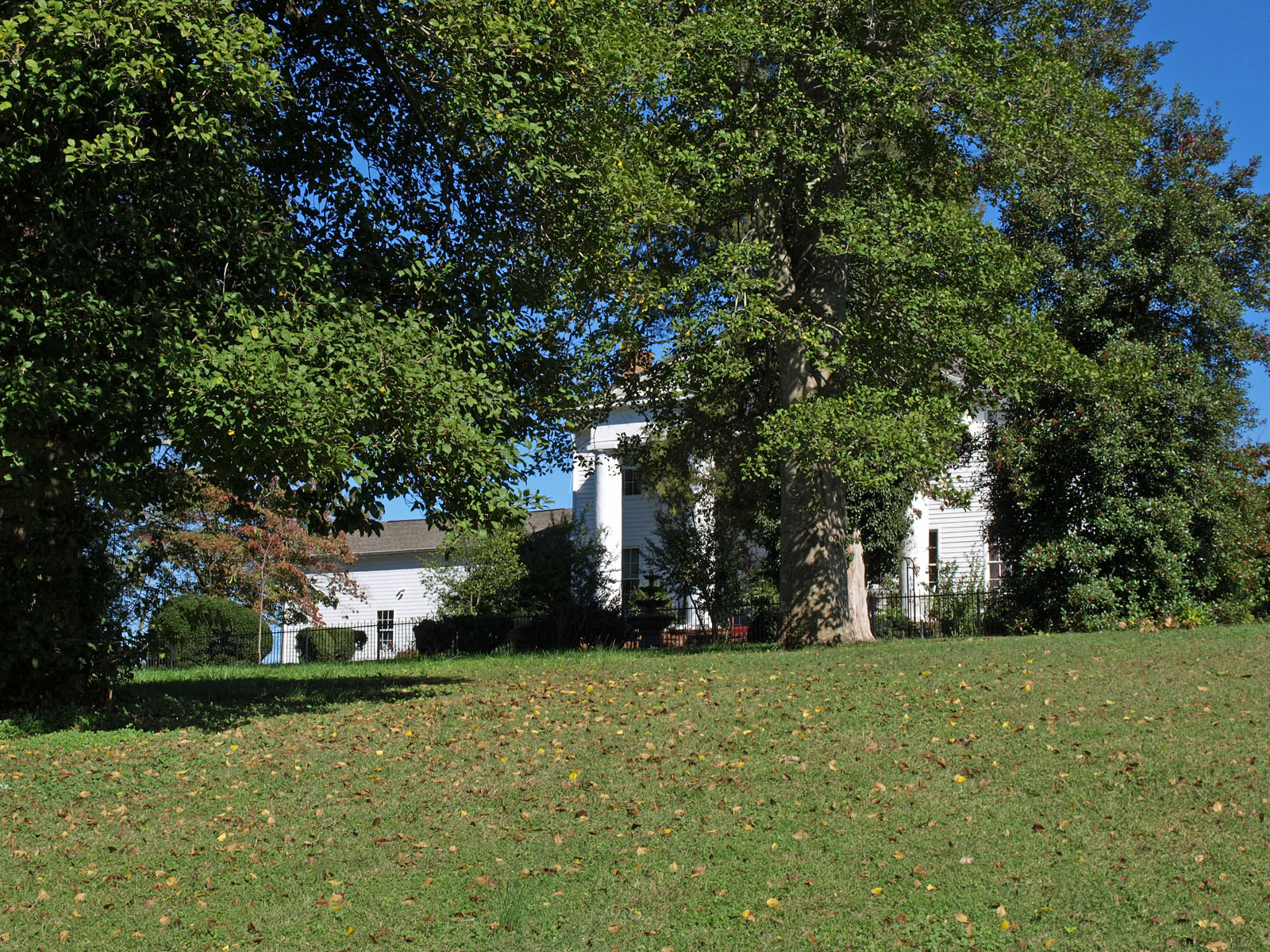
- The house in October 2011

- Location within Alabama Location within the United States
- Nearest city: Meridianville, Alabama
- Coordinates: 34°50′10″N 86°34′13″W
- Area: 1.8 acres (0.73 ha)
- Built: 1849–1850
- Architectural style: Greek Revival
- NRHP reference No.: 82002056

Significant dates
- Added to NRHP: January 19, 1982
- Designated ARLH: January 31, 1979

Greenlawn (also known as the William Madison Otey House) is a historic residence between Meridianville and Huntsville, Alabama. The house was built in 1849–50 by William Otey, replacing a log house built by his father in the early 1810s. Following William and his wife's deaths, the house was taken over by one of their granddaughters in 1907. Around 1925, the original Italianate portico was replaced with the current Greek Revival entrance, and a northern wing was added. The house fell vacant in 1963 and was later restored, now sitting at the entrance to a subdivision of the same name.

The house has a two-story main block with a single story portion to the rear. The façade is dominated by a tetrastyle portico with Doric order columns. The double front door is flanked by sidelights and topped with a rectangular transom. Two chimneys in the gable roof ends are unusual in that they are exposed below the pediment, but pass behind the tympanum before exiting the top of the roof. The shed roof of the northern addition is hidden from the front by a wooden parapet. The interior is laid out with a central hall, divided into an entry foyer and rear stairhall, with two rooms to either side. The northern two rooms are separated by a narrow hall leading to a roofed porch. The parlor and dining room on the southern side are divided by a triple-leaf folding door. A hall and two bedrooms occupy the second floor.

The house was listed on the Alabama Register of Landmarks and Heritage in 1979 and the National Register of Historic Places in 1982.

The Otey Mansion and surrounding 300 acres were purchased by Atnip Construction in the late 1980s. The mansion serves as the focal point of the subdivision development, Greenlawn Plantation. The Otey family cemetery still exists outside the neighborhood pool house.
