= Leech–Hauer House =

Historic house in Alabama, United States

- U.S. National Register of Historic Places
- Alabama Register of Landmarks and Heritage
- The house in December 1978
- Interactive map of Leech–Hauer House
- Location: 502 Governors Dr., Huntsville, Alabama
- Coordinates: 34°43′14″N 86°35′13″W
- Area: 1.4 acres (0.57 ha)
- Built: 1830
- Architectural style: Greek Revival, Federal, Transitional
- Demolished: circa 1978–1988
- NRHP reference No.: 78000498

Significant dates
- Added to NRHP: December 8, 1978
- Designated ARLH: July 28, 1978

The Leech–Hauer House was a historic residence in Huntsville, Alabama. It was built circa 1830 by professional carpenter William Leech. It was built in a transitional style between Federal and Greek Revival. The house was a two-story, L-shaped structure, with a front porch which was later enclosed. John G. Hauer purchased the house in 1904, and it remained a family residence until it was sold to a flower shop in 1974. It was purchased by physician (and later politician) Parker Griffith and his brother in 1977. The house was listed on the Alabama Register of Landmarks and Heritage and National Register of Historic Places in 1978. The house was subsequently demolished, and a modern medical office building was constructed on the site in 1988.
