= Sayre Street School =

- U.S. National Register of Historic Places
- Alabama Register of Landmarks and Heritage
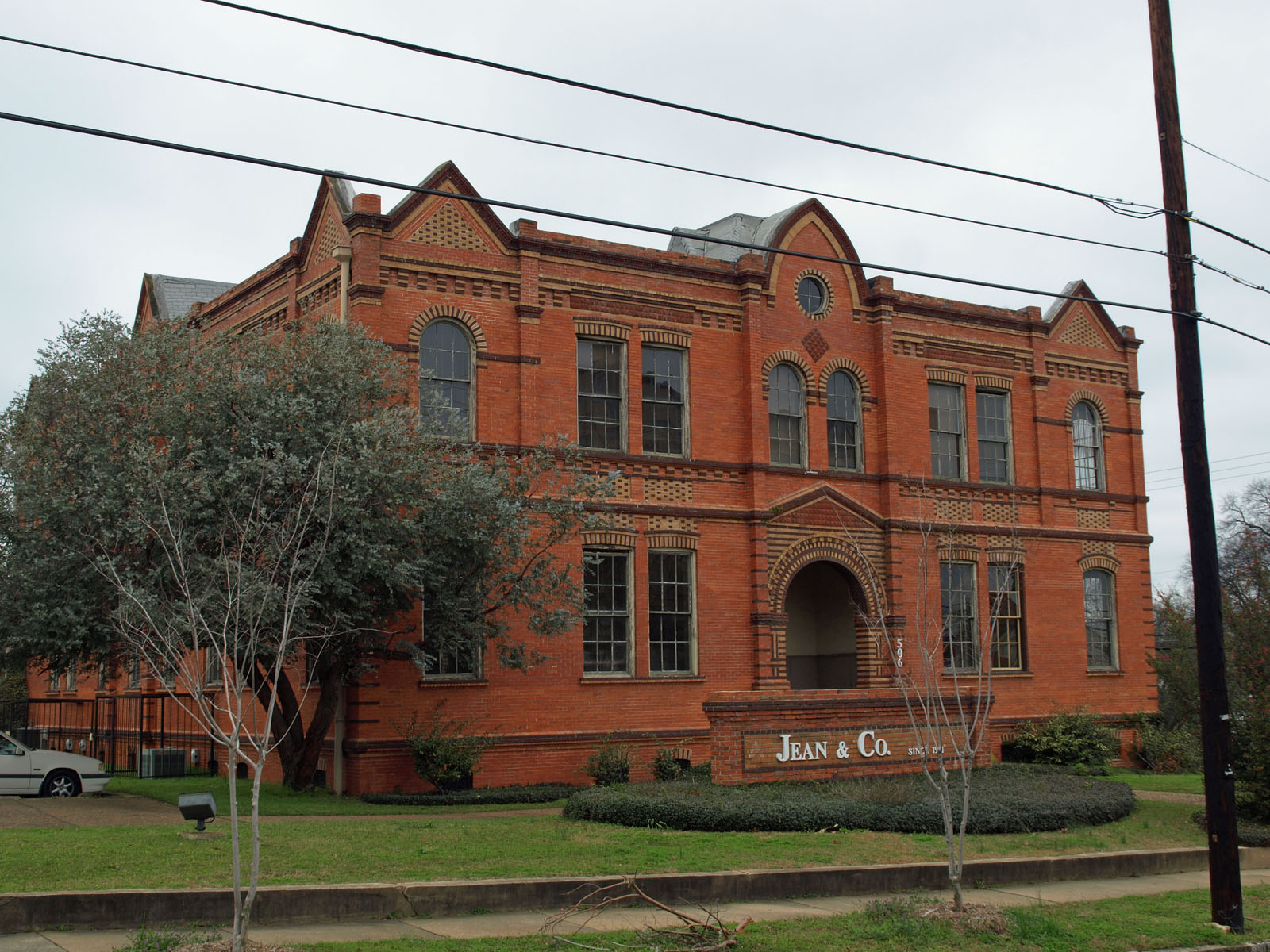

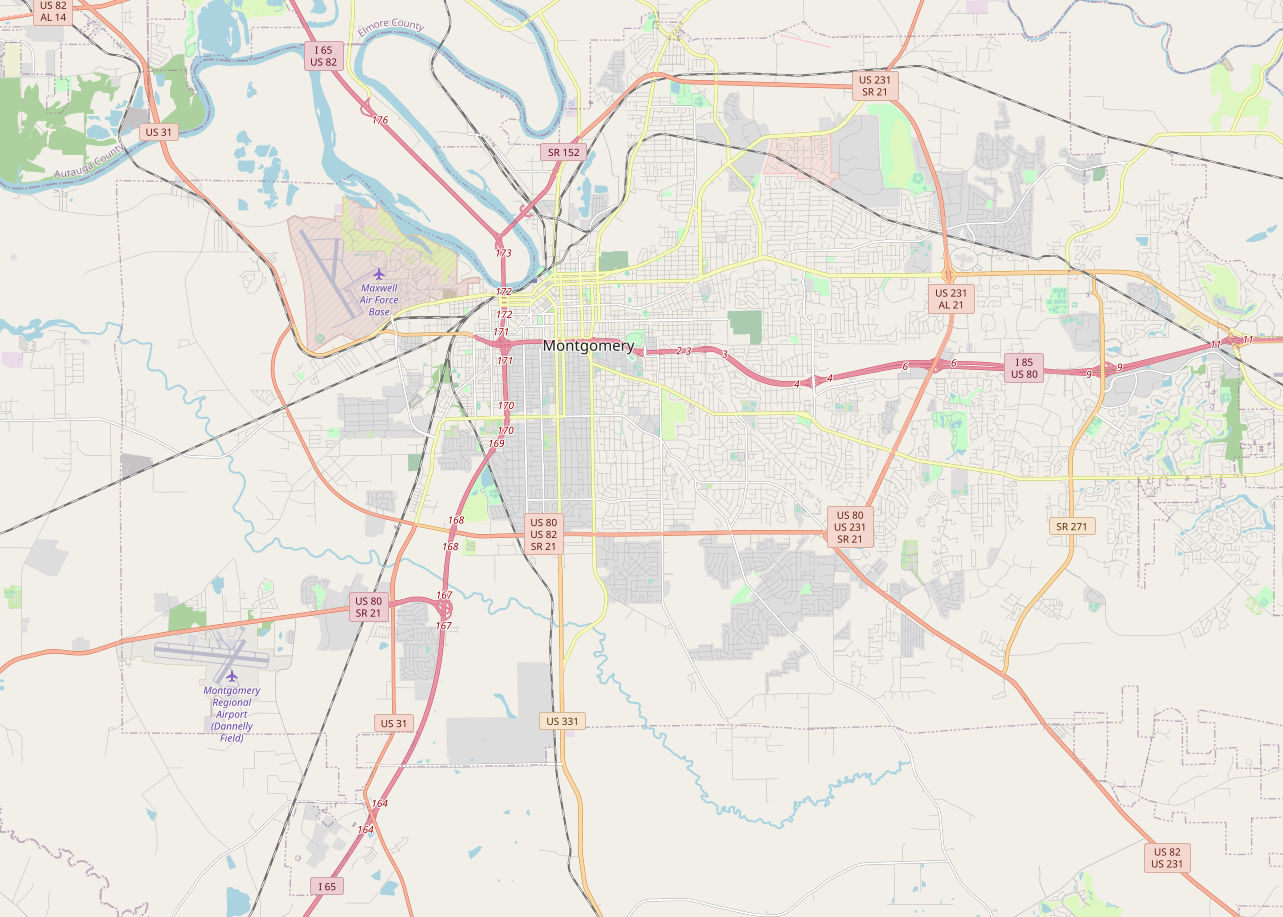
- Location within Montgomery, Alabama Location within Alabama Location within the United States
- Location: 506 Sayre Street, Montgomery, Alabama
- Coordinates: 32°22′15″N 86°18′39″W
- Built: 1891
- Built by: J. B. Worthington
- Architectural style: Romanesque
- NRHP reference No.: 82002066

Significant dates
- Added to NRHP: February 19, 1982
- Designated ARLH: April 11, 1984

The Sayre Street School (formerly, Chilton College) building is located at 506 Sayre Street, in an older residential neighborhood near downtown Montgomery, Alabama. The school was originally built in 1891 by builder J. B. Worthington and served as office space until 2017. The building and surrounding landscape, now abandoned and neglected, have fallen into a state of major disrepair.

On February 19, 1982 the building was added to the U.S. National Register of Historic Places.

== History ==
Chilton College was an institution for the education of girls and young women, established in Montgomery, 1866, by Lavinia Bradford Chilton. It was at first located on Felder Avenue. In 1872, she purchased the building formerly occupied by Cox College, corner of Sayre and Mildred Streets, to which the school was removed. After 10 years successful work, Mrs. Chilton's health failed, and in August 1882, she sold the property to the City of Montgomery and closed the institution. It was turned over to the city school board which opened it as the Sayre Street Grammar School in the fall of that year, as a part of the municipal school system. The old building had been marked by a marble slab inscribed "Chilton College". To commemorate its existence and also the educational work of Mrs. Chilton, in 1909, this slab was formally placed on the base, and near the northeast corner of the Sayre Street School building by the Peter Forney Chapter, Daughters of the American Revolution.
