= Wheeler National Wildlife Refuge Warden's Residence =

Historic house in Alabama, United States

- Warden's Residence
- U.S. National Register of Historic Places
- Alabama Register of Landmarks and Heritage
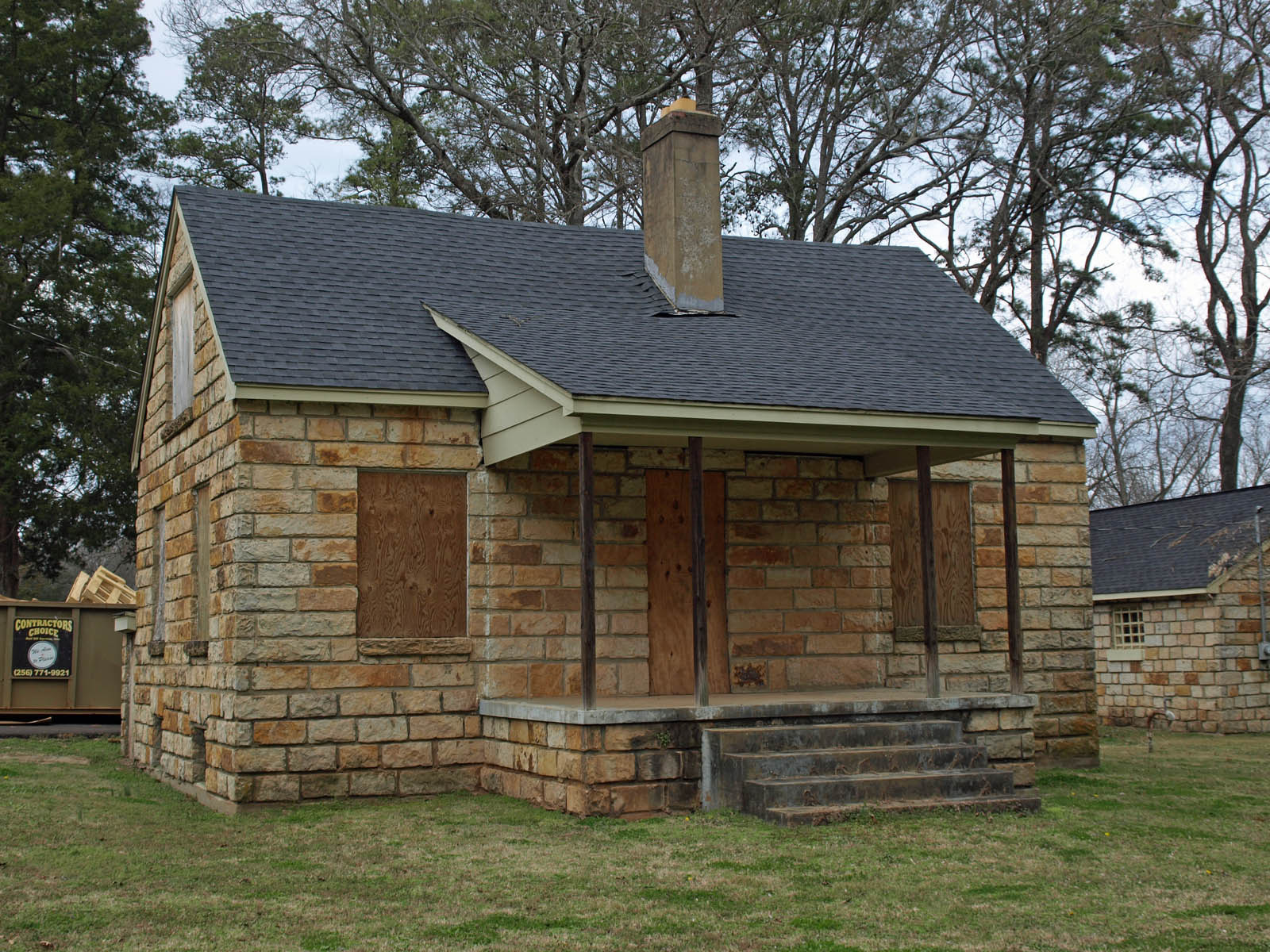
- The house in February 2012

- Location within Alabama Location within the United States
- Location: Triana, Alabama
- Coordinates: 34°34′53″N 86°43′56″W
- Area: 0.4 acres (0.16 ha)
- Built: 1941
- Architect: Grammer and Holland
- Architectural style: stone, side gable
- NRHP reference No.: 10000258

Significant dates
- Added to NRHP: May 17, 2010
- Designated ARLH: February 2, 2001

The Wheeler National Wildlife Refuge Warden's Residence, also known simply as Warden's Residence, is a house in Triana, Alabama. It was built in 1941 by the Civilian Conservation Corps to serve as the residence of the warden of Wheeler National Wildlife Refuge. It was used by the warden until 1947, and in 1950, the local clinic serving African Americans in the area was moved into the house. The clinic was later desegregated, and operated until 1990. Today, the house is the center of a 25-acre (10 ha) park run by the town.

The building was listed on the Alabama Register of Landmarks and Heritage in 2001 and the National Register of Historic Places in 2010. The listing included two contributing buildings on 0.4 acres (0.16 ha).
