= Alabama Register of Landmarks and Heritage =

Official government listing of what is worthy of historic preservation

The Alabama Register of Landmarks and Heritage (ARLH), commonly referred to as the Alabama Register, is an official listing of buildings, sites, structures, objects, and districts deemed worthy of preservation in the U.S. state of Alabama. These properties, which may be of national, state, and local significance, are designated by the Alabama Historical Commission. The designation is honorary and carries no direct restrictions or incentives. The register includes properties such as cemeteries, churches, moved properties, reconstructed properties, and properties at least 40 years old which may not normally qualify for listing in the National Register of Historic Places. There are approximately 1,711 properties and districts listed on the Alabama Register. Of these, approximately 243 are also listed on the National Register of Historic Places and 6 are designated as National Historic Landmarks.

== Nomination ==
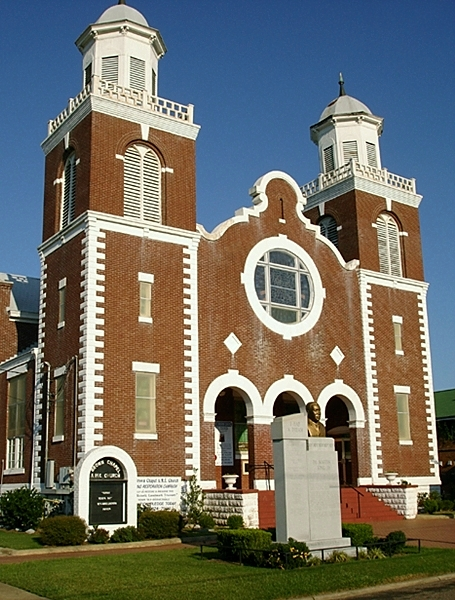
Brown Chapel AME Church in Selma, Alabama. Listed in the Alabama Register of Landmarks and Heritage on June 16, 1976. It is an example of a property that was subsequently listed in the National Register of Historic Places in 1982 and declared a National Historic Landmark in 1997.

The Alabama Register was created by the Alabama Historical Commission to provide the public with a fast and easy way to bring recognition to historic properties. People interested in historic recognition in Alabama are encouraged to begin with the Alabama Register of Landmarks and Heritage program. Nominations may be submitted by anyone to the Alabama Historical Commission. A staff review committee then determines if the nominated property meets the established selection criteria and the property is added to the register if the criteria are met.

Property nominations for the Alabama Register also help the Alabama Historical Commission determine whether or not a property is eligible for listing in the National Register.

== Selection criteria ==
General criteria for inclusion in the Alabama Register includes that the property be at least 40 years old and be associated with events of state or local significance, associated with the lives of persons of state or local significance, representative of a type, style, or period of architecture, or associated with Alabama's history or prehistory. It should also possess integrity of location and construction and convey a feeling for the time and place of construction.

Structures that have been moved from their original locations, reconstructed historic buildings, and properties that are less than 40 years old are not usually considered for inclusion. Those that have been moved or reconstructed may be considered if they have been sensitively relocated to a site similar to the original, closely match the construction of the original significant building, or are of exceptional importance to the state.

== Listings by county ==
- Properties on the Alabama Register of Landmarks and Heritage by county (Autauga–Choctaw)
- Properties on the Alabama Register of Landmarks and Heritage by county (Clarke–Dallas)
- Properties on the Alabama Register of Landmarks and Heritage by county (DeKalb–Jackson)
- Properties on the Alabama Register of Landmarks and Heritage by county (Jefferson–Macon)
- Properties on the Alabama Register of Landmarks and Heritage by county (Madison–Perry)
- Properties on the Alabama Register of Landmarks and Heritage by county (Pickens–Winston)
Number of properties by county

	County	Number of properties and districts
1	Autauga	19
2	Baldwin	38
3	Barbour	16
4	Bibb	12
5	Blount	25
6	Bullock	24
7	Butler	38
8	Calhoun	44
9	Chambers	23
10	Cherokee	13
11	Chilton	14
12	Choctaw	10
13	Clarke	23
14	Clay	7
15	Cleburne	8
16	Coffee	13
17	Colbert	21
18	Conecuh	38
19	Coosa	17
20	Covington	18
21	Crenshaw	10
22	Cullman	50
23	Dale	11
24	Dallas	74
25	DeKalb	50
26	Elmore	53
27	Escambia	15
28	Etowah	33
29	Fayette	6
30	Franklin	14
31	Geneva	5
32	Greene	18
33	Hale	13
34	Henry	10
35	Houston	16
36	Jackson	24
37	Jefferson	104
38	Lamar	7
39	Lauderdale	39
40	Lawrence	20
41	Lee	40
42	Limestone	19
43	Lowndes	24
44	Macon	16
45	Madison	49
46	Marengo	21
47	Marion	14
48	Marshall	20
49	Mobile	42
50	Monroe	21
51	Montgomery	85
52	Morgan	34
53	Perry	14
54	Pickens	13
55	Pike	24
56	Randolph	7
57	Russell	20
58	St. Clair	23
59	Shelby	46
60	Sumter	17
61	Talladega	43
62	Tallapoosa	15
63	Tuscaloosa	50
64	Walker	16
65	Washington	11
66	Wilcox	29
67	Winston	5
(duplicate)		(1) (Note: The following site is listed in multiple counties: Martin Dam (Elmore and Tallapoosa))
Total:		1,683

== See also ==
- History of Alabama
- National Register of Historic Places listings in Alabama
