= National Register of Historic Places listings in Madison County, Alabama =

Location of Madison County in Alabama

The following properties are listed on the National Register of Historic Places in Madison County, Alabama.

This is intended to be a complete list of the properties and districts on the National Register of Historic Places in Madison County, Alabama, United States. Latitude and longitude coordinates are provided for many National Register properties and districts; these locations may be seen together in an online.

There are 90 properties and districts listed on the National Register in the county, including six National Historic Landmarks.

This National Park Service list is complete through NPS recent listings posted May 1, 2026.

== Current listings ==
	Name on the Register	Image	Date listed	Location	City or town	Description
1	Alabama Agricultural and Mechanical University Historic District	Alabama Agricultural and Mechanical University Historic District	December 31, 2001 (#01001407)	Chase Rd. 34°46′43″N 86°34′18″W	Huntsville	
2	Beckers Block	Beckers Block	September 22, 1980 (#80000703)	105–111 N. Jefferson St.s; 34°43′53″N 86°35′13″W	Huntsville	
3	James H. Bibb House	James H. Bibb House	April 12, 1984 (#84000651)	11 Allen St. 34°41′33″N 86°45′13″W	Madison	
4	Big Spring	Big Spring	September 22, 1980 (#80000704)	W. Side Sq. 34°43′47″N 86°35′09″W	Huntsville	
5	Building at 105 S. Washington Street	Building at 105 S. Washington Street	May 23, 1984 (#84000653)	105 S. Washington St. 34°43′53″N 86°35′07″W	Huntsville	
6	Building at 305 Jefferson	Building at 305 Jefferson	November 15, 2003 (#03001134)	305 Jefferson St. 34°44′00″N 86°35′18″W	Huntsville	
7	Buildings at 104–128 S. Side Sq.	Buildings at 104–128 S. Side Sq.	September 22, 1980 (#80004472)	104–128 S. Side Sq. 34°43′47″N 86°35′05″W	Huntsville	
8	William Burritt Mansion	William Burritt Mansion	May 29, 1992 (#92000627)	3101 Burritt Dr., SE. 34°42′57″N 86°32′22″W	Huntsville	
9	Butlers' Store	Butlers' Store	August 31, 1992 (#92001089)	5498 Main Dr. 34°32′13″N 86°23′40″W	New Hope	
10	Church of the Visitation	Church of the Visitation	September 22, 1980 (#80000705)	222 N. Jefferson St. 34°43′58″N 86°35′14″W	Huntsville	
11	Clemens House	Clemens House	October 16, 1974 (#74000419)	Pratt Ave. at Meridian St. 34°44′19″N 86°35′03″W	Huntsville	Moved from its original location (Clinton Ave. at Church St.) in 2004
12	Dallas Mill	Dallas Mill	September 18, 1978 (#78000496)	701 Dallas Ave. 34°44′50″N 86°34′49″W	Huntsville	Destroyed by fire in 1991
13	Dallas Mill Village Historic District	Dallas Mill Village Historic District	June 27, 2011 (#11000406)	Bounded by Dickson St. NE. to Russell St. NE., Rison Ave. NE. to Pratt Ave. NE. 34°44′33″N 86°34′44″W	Huntsville	
14	Domestic Science Building	Domestic Science Building	April 11, 1973 (#73000358)	Alabama Agricultural and Mechanical University campus 34°47′07″N 86°34′09″W	Huntsville	
15	Donegan Block	Donegan Block	September 22, 1980 (#80000706)	105–109 N. Side Sq. 34°43′51″N 86°35′08″W	Huntsville	
16	Downtown Chevron Station	Downtown Chevron Station	September 22, 1980 (#80000707)	300 E. Clinton Ave. 34°43′56″N 86°35′03″W	Huntsville	Demolished in 1980s.
17	Dunnavant's Building	Dunnavant's Building	September 22, 1980 (#80000708)	100 N. Washington St. 34°43′55″N 86°35′08″W	Huntsville	
18	Joel Eddins House	Joel Eddins House	September 12, 1996 (#96001004)	3101 Burritt Drive; 34°43′01″N 86°32′23″W	Huntsville	Moved in 2007, originally located near Ardmore in Limestone County
19	Edmonton Heights Historic District	Edmonton Heights Historic District	June 21, 2021 (#100006659)	3800-3822 Colton Ln. NE, 3802-3831 Crane Dr. NE, 3802-3811 Eton Rd. NE, 3812-3818 Melody Cir. NE, 3800-3836 Melody Rd. NE, 3800-3814 Meridian St. North, 200-303 Salem Dr. NE, 202-250 Victory Ln. NE, 100-125 Whitney Ave. NE, 100-199 Wilkenson Dr. NE; 34°46′35″N 86°34′02″W	Huntsville	
20	Episcopal Church of the Nativity	Episcopal Church of the Nativity	October 9, 1974 (#74000420)	212 Eustis St. 34°43′48″N 86°35′00″W	Huntsville	
21	Everett Building	Everett Building	September 22, 1980 (#80000709)	115–123 N. Washington St. 34°43′56″N 86°35′10″W	Huntsville	
22	First Baptist Church	First Baptist Church	July 11, 2025 (#100011919)	600 Governor's Drive SW; 34°43′12″N 86°35′18″W	Huntsville	
23	First National Bank	First National Bank	October 25, 1974 (#74000421)	West Side Sq. 34°43′47″N 86°35′09″W	Huntsville	
24	Five Points Historic District	Five Points Historic District	August 20, 2012 (#12000522)	Roughly Beirne, Clinton, Eustis, Grayson, McCullough, Pratt, Randolph, Russell, Ward, Wellman, & Wells Aves. 34°44′19″N 86°34′21″W	Huntsville	
25	Flint River Place	Flint River Place	January 18, 1982 (#82002050)	1997 Jordan Rd. 34°47′01″N 86°29′37″W	Huntsville	
26	Hezekiah Ford House	Hezekiah Ford House	June 13, 2014 (#14000318)	920 Countess Rd. 34°49′13″N 86°32′56″W	Huntsville	
27	Fowler's Department Store	Fowler's Department Store	May 30, 1996 (#96000597)	116 Washington and 214 Holmes Sts. 34°43′57″N 86°35′09″W	Huntsville	Partially deconstructed in 2011–12. The façade was retained and used for the Belk Husdon Lofts.
28	Glenwood Cemetery	Glenwood Cemetery	September 20, 2023 (#100009123)	2300 Hall Ave. 34°43′34″N 86°36′08″W	Huntsville	
29	Gurley Historic District	Gurley Historic District	June 2, 2004 (#04000562)	Section Line St., Railroad St., Maple Boulevard and Church St. between Gurley Pike and Jackson St. 34°42′00″N 86°22′25″W	Gurley	
30	Halsey Grocery Warehouse	Halsey Grocery Warehouse	September 22, 1980 (#80000710)	301 N. Jefferson St. 34°43′59″N 86°35′18″W	Huntsville	
31	W. L. Halsey Warehouse	W. L. Halsey Warehouse	September 22, 1980 (#80000711)	300 N. Jefferson St. 34°44′00″N 86°35′17″W	Huntsville	
32	Henderson National Bank	Henderson National Bank	September 22, 1980 (#80000712)	118 S. Jefferson St. 34°43′50″N 86°35′10″W	Huntsville	
33	Hotel Russel Erskine	Hotel Russel Erskine	September 22, 1980 (#80000713)	123 W. Clinton Ave. 34°43′50″N 86°35′14″W	Huntsville	
34	David C. Humphreys House	David C. Humphreys House	August 3, 1977 (#77000211)	109 Gates Ave. 34°43′41″N 86°35′07″W	Huntsville	Originally located at 510 W. Clinton Ave. W.
35	Hundley House	Hundley House	May 22, 1978 (#78000497)	401 Madison St. 34°43′43″N 86°35′04″W	Huntsville	
36	Hundley Rental Houses	Hundley Rental Houses	September 22, 1980 (#80000714)	108 Gates St. and 400 Franklin St. 34°43′44″N 86°35′02″W	Huntsville	
37	Terry Hutchens Building	Terry Hutchens Building	September 22, 1980 (#80000715)	102 W. Clinton Ave. 34°43′52″N 86°35′13″W	Huntsville	
38	W. T. Hutchens Building	W. T. Hutchens Building	December 28, 1983 (#83004374)	100–104 S. Jefferson St. 34°43′51″N 86°35′12″W	Huntsville	
39	George Jude House	George Jude House	February 24, 2000 (#00000139)	2132 Winchester Rd. 34°47′37″N 86°35′12″W	Huntsville	
40	Kelly Brothers and Rowe Building	Kelly Brothers and Rowe Building	September 22, 1980 (#80000716)	307 N. Jefferson St. 34°44′00″N 86°35′18″W	Huntsville	
41	Kildare-McCormick House	Kildare-McCormick House	July 15, 1982 (#82002051)	2005 Kildare St. 34°44′59″N 86°35′06″W	Huntsville	
42	Kress Building	Kress Building	September 22, 1980 (#80000717)	107 S. Washington St. 34°43′53″N 86°35′07″W	Huntsville	
43	William Lanford House	William Lanford House	May 20, 1994 (#94000499)	7400 Old Madison Pike; 34°42′54″N 86°41′44″W	Huntsville	
44	Leech-Hauer House	Leech-Hauer House	December 8, 1978 (#78000498)	502 Governors Dr. 34°43′14″N 86°35′13″W	Huntsville	Demolished, now a medical office building on site
45	Lincoln Mill and Mill Village Historic District	Lincoln Mill and Mill Village Historic District	April 26, 2010 (#10000200)	Bounded by Meridian St., Oakwood Ave., Front St., Mountain View Dr., Davidson St., Cottage St, and King Ave. 34°44′52″N 86°34′55″W	Huntsville	
46	Lincoln School	Lincoln School	December 27, 1982 (#82001608)	1110 N. Meridian St. 34°44′43″N 86°35′02″W	Huntsville	
47	Lombardo Building	Lombardo Building	September 22, 1980 (#80000718)	315 N. Jefferson St. 34°44′01″N 86°35′19″W	Huntsville	
48	Lowe Mill and Mill Village Historic District	Lowe Mill and Mill Village Historic District	June 24, 2011 (#11000375)	Bounded by Triana Blvd. SW., 10th Ave. SW., Summer St. & Governor's Dr. 34°43′02″N 86°36′11″W	Huntsville	
49	Lowry House	Lowry House	October 29, 2001 (#01001165)	1205 Kildare Ave. 34°44′49″N 86°35′08″W	Huntsville	
50	Madison Station Historic District	Madison Station Historic District	March 29, 2006 (#06000185)	Roughly bounded by the Wall Triana Highway, Mill Rd., Church St., Maple St., Martin St., and Bradley St. 34°41′46″N 86°44′51″W	Madison	
51	Maple Hill Cemetery	Maple Hill Cemetery	August 22, 2012 (#12000523)	203 Maple Hill Dr. 34°43′59″N 86°34′24″W	Huntsville	
52	Mason Building	Mason Building	September 22, 1980 (#80000719)	115 E. Clinton Ave. 34°43′54″N 86°35′09″W	Huntsville	
53	May and Cooney Dry Goods Company	May and Cooney Dry Goods Company	September 22, 1980 (#80000720)	205 E. Side Sq. 34°43′51″N 86°35′04″W	Huntsville	
54	McCartney-Bone House	McCartney-Bone House	December 16, 1977 (#77000213)	3 miles northeast of Maysville on Hurricane Rd. 34°47′39″N 86°24′32″W	Maysville	
55	McCrary House	McCrary House	June 1, 1982 (#82002052)	Northeast of Huntsville; 34°50′43″N 86°29′14″W	Huntsville	
56	McThornmor Acres Subdivision Historic District	McThornmor Acres Subdivision Historic District	February 9, 2022 (#100004119)	Holmes Ave. NW, Brickell Rd. NW, Northington St. NW and Woodall Ln. NW; 34°43′51″N 86°37′53″W	Huntsville	
57	Merrimack Mill Village Historic District	Merrimack Mill Village Historic District	April 16, 2010 (#10000172)	Alpine St., Triana Blvd., Dunn Dr., Cobb Rd., Drake Ave., & Grote St. 34°42′15″N 86°36′41″W	Huntsville	
58	Milligan Block	Milligan Block	September 22, 1980 (#80000721)	201–203 E. Side Sq. 34°43′51″N 86°35′05″W	Huntsville	
59	Monte Sano Railroad Workers' House	Monte Sano Railroad Workers' House	August 14, 1998 (#98001019)	4119 Shelby Ave. 34°44′29″N 86°31′26″W	Huntsville	
60	Neutral Buoyancy Space Simulator	Neutral Buoyancy Space Simulator	October 3, 1985 (#85002807)	George C. Marshall Space Flight Center; 34°39′11″N 86°40′39″W	Huntsville	
61	New Market Historic District	New Market Historic District	March 31, 2004 (#04000237)	Roughly bounded by Mountain Fork, College St., Davis St., Winchester Rd. to Cochran St., and parts of Cochran St. and Cedar St. 34°54′30″N 86°25′43″W	New Market	
62	New Market Presbyterian Church	New Market Presbyterian Church	August 25, 1988 (#88001348)	1723 New Market Rd. 34°54′37″N 86°25′46″W	New Market	
63	New Market United Methodist Church	New Market United Methodist Church	June 14, 1990 (#90000919)	310 Hurricane Rd. 34°54′26″N 86°25′36″W	New Market	
64	Old Town Historic District	Old Town Historic District	July 18, 1978 (#78000499)	Roughly bounded by Dement and Lincoln Sts. and Randolph and Walker Aves.; 305, 309, 310 Dallas St. & 115, 118, 120 Walker Ave. 34°44′07″N 86°34′50″W	Huntsville	Second set of address represent a boundary increase listed March 17, 2015
65	William Madison Otey House	William Madison Otey House	January 19, 1982 (#82002056)	South of Meridianville; 34°50′10″N 86°34′13″W	Meridianville	
66	Phelps-Jones House	Phelps-Jones House	February 19, 1982 (#82002053)	6112 Pulaski Pike; 34°48′02″N 86°37′10″W	Huntsville	
67	Propulsion and Structural Test Facility	Propulsion and Structural Test Facility	October 3, 1985 (#85002804)	George C. Marshall Space Flight Center; 34°37′31″N 86°39′31″W	Huntsville	Demolished January 10, 2026.
68	Rand Building	Rand Building	September 22, 1980 (#80000722)	113 N. Side Sq. 34°43′51″N 86°35′07″W	Huntsville	
69	Randolph Street Church of Christ	Randolph Street Church of Christ	September 22, 1980 (#80000723)	210 Randolph Ave. 34°43′52″N 86°35′03″W	Huntsville	
70	Redstone Test Stand	Redstone Test Stand	May 13, 1976 (#76000341)	George C. Marshall Space Flight Center; 34°37′58″N 86°40′00″W	Huntsville	
71	John Robinson House	John Robinson House	October 6, 1977 (#77000212)	2709 Meridian St., N. 34°45′38″N 86°34′38″W	Huntsville	
72	Mrs. William Robinson House	Mrs. William Robinson House	February 4, 1982 (#82002054)	401 Quietdale Dr., NE. 34°45′25″N 86°34′26″W	Huntsville	
73	Saturn V Dynamic Test Stand	Saturn V Dynamic Test Stand	October 3, 1985 (#85002806)	George C. Marshall Space Flight Center; 34°37′51″N 86°39′40″W	Huntsville	Demolished January 10, 2026.
74	Saturn V Space Vehicle	Saturn V Space Vehicle	November 22, 1978 (#78000500)	Tranquility Base; 34°42′36″N 86°39′21″W	Huntsville	
75	Schiffman Building	Schiffman Building	September 22, 1980 (#80000724)	231 E. Side Sq. 34°43′49″N 86°35′03″W	Huntsville	
76	Southern Railway System Depot	Southern Railway System Depot	September 10, 1971 (#71000101)	330 Church St. 34°44′04″N 86°35′27″W	Huntsville	
77	Steele-Fowler House	Steele-Fowler House	June 20, 1974 (#74000422)	808 Maysville Rd. 34°44′40″N 86°33′52″W	Huntsville	
78	Steger House	Steger House	June 1, 1982 (#82002055)	3141 Maysville Rd. 34°46′17″N 86°25′46″W	Maysville	
79	Struve-Hay Building	Struve-Hay Building	September 22, 1980 (#80000725)	117–123 N. Jefferson St. 34°43′55″N 86°35′14″W	Huntsville	
80	Times Building	Times Building	September 22, 1980 (#80000726)	228 E. Holmes Ave. 34°43′59″N 86°35′07″W	Huntsville	
81	Twickenham Historic District	Twickenham Historic District	January 4, 1973 (#73000357)	Roughly bounded by Clinton Ave., California St., Newman Ave. and S. Green St., and Franklin St. 34°43′47″N 86°34′43″W	Huntsville	Boundary increase May 26, 2015
82	U.S. Courthouse and Post Office	U.S. Courthouse and Post Office	February 24, 1981 (#81000129)	101 E. Holmes Ave. 34°43′57″N 86°35′13″W	Huntsville	
83	Urquhart House	Urquhart House	February 13, 1992 (#92000034)	8042 Pulaski Pike; 34°51′01″N 86°38′12″W	Huntsville	
84	Vaught House	Vaught House	December 15, 1981 (#81000130)	701 Ward Ave. 34°44′24″N 86°34′36″W	Huntsville	
85	Warden's Residence	Warden's Residence	May 17, 2010 (#10000258)	151 Stone St. 34°34′53″N 86°43′56″W	Triana	
86	White-Turner-Sanford House	White-Turner-Sanford House	April 12, 1984 (#84000655)	601 Madison St. 34°43′33″N 86°34′54″W	Huntsville	
87	Whitesburg Estates Historic District	Whitesburg Estates Historic District	November 12, 2024 (#100010967)	10101-10115 Cahaba Road SW 2100-2206 Chadburn Drive SW 1919-1928 Edenton Drive SW 1905-1930 Lynnbrook Drive SW 2100-2206 Manassas Drive SW 10100-10106 Memorial Parkway SW (even numbers only) 2114-2118 Mythewood Circle SW 2006-2119 Mythewood Drive SW 10100; 34°37′59″N 86°34′20″W	Huntsville	
88	Whitman-Cobb House	Whitman-Cobb House	January 18, 1982 (#82002057)	Winchester Rd. 34°54′13″N 86°25′45″W	New Market	
89	Withers-Chapman House	Withers-Chapman House	December 8, 1978 (#78000501)	2409 Dairy Lane, NE. 34°45′24″N 86°33′42″W	Huntsville	
90	Yarbrough Hotel	Yarbrough Hotel	September 22, 1980 (#80000727)	127–129 N. Washington St. 34°43′57″N 86°35′11″W	Huntsville	

== See also ==
- List of National Historic Landmarks in Alabama
- National Register of Historic Places listings in Alabama
