= Cooper Estates =

Alabama subdivision community

Coordinates: 34°46′29.24″N 86°27′32.6″W

Cooper Estates is a subdivision community in Northeastern Madison County, Alabama, and is in the United States. Cooper Estates is in the Maysville and Ryland area with the zip code 35811. The subdivision was built in 1991.
