= Times Building (Huntsville, Alabama) =

Building in Alabama, U.S.

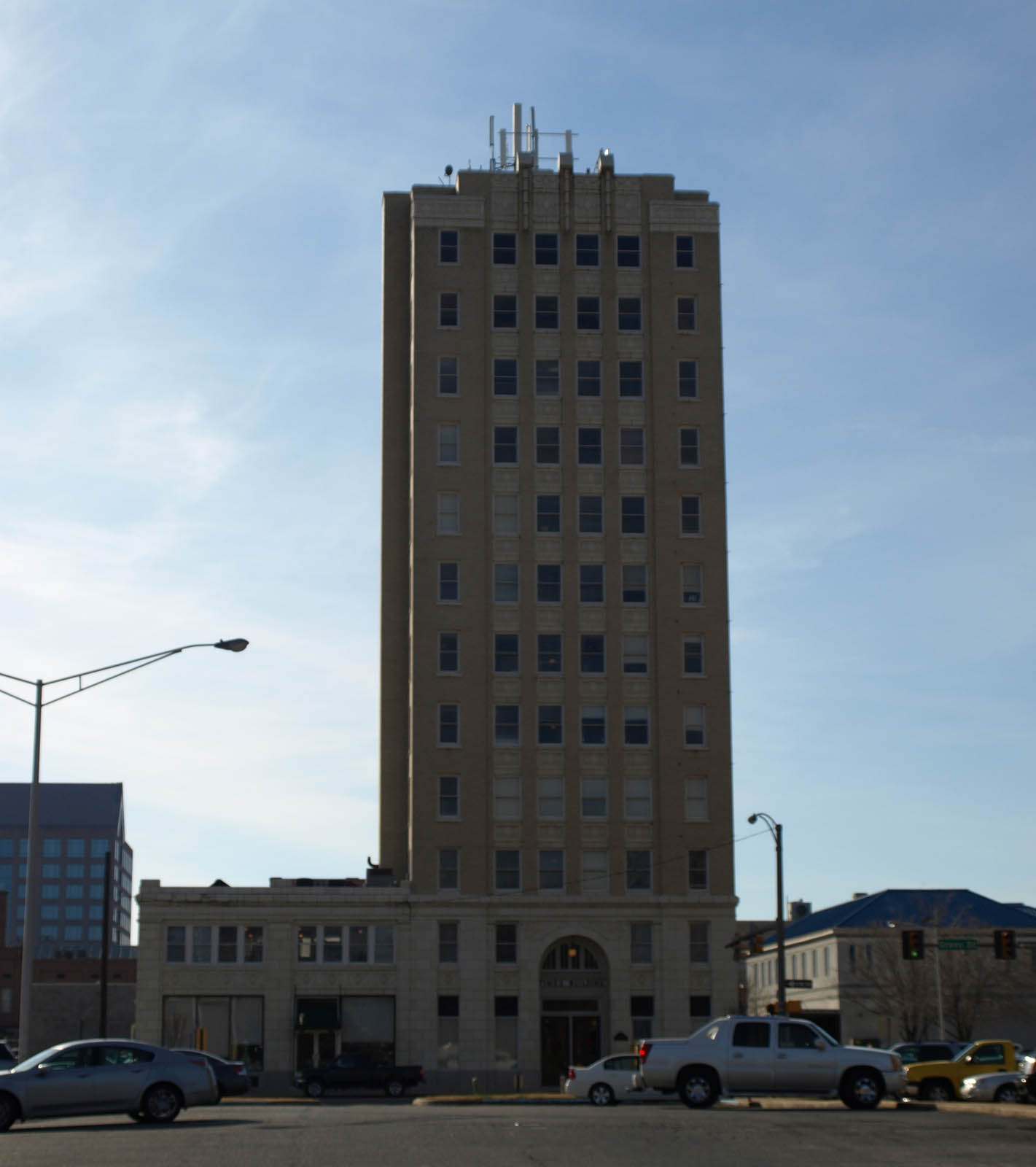
- Interactive map of the Times Building area
- Alternative names: Huntsville Daily Times Building; Huntsville Times Building

General information
- Type: Commercial office building; educational institution
- Architectural style: Art Deco
- Location: 228 East Holmes Avenue, Huntsville, Alabama, United States
- Coordinates: 34.7330°N 86.5852°W
- Opened: December 1928

Height
- Height: 125 feet

Technical details
- Floor count: 12
- Floor area: 34,000 sq ft (3,200 m^{2})
- Lifts/elevators: 2

Design and construction
- Architecture firm: R.H. Hunt Co.

Other information
- Parking: Street
- Times Building
- U.S. National Register of Historic Places
- Built: 1926–28
- Architect: R.H. Hunt Company
- MPS: Downtown Huntsville MRA
- NRHP reference No.: 80000726
- Added to NRHP: September 22, 1980

The Times Building is one of the oldest and tallest buildings in Huntsville, Alabama, United States. Standing at 125 feet (38 m), the twelve story skyscraper opened in December 1928 as the headquarters for The Huntsville Times. The building, which is primarily used for office space, is located at the intersection of Holmes Avenue and Greene Street on the north side of Downtown Huntsville. In 1980, the building was listed on the National Register of Historic Places.

== Tenants ==
J.F. Drake State Community and Technical College moved into the basement level of the building in January 2010 with seven classrooms (including two large computer labs) covering 10,000 square feet (930 m^{2}).

== History ==
Originally the building was only to have eleven floors, but a twelfth floor was added during construction when the builder of the Russel Erskine Hotel announced that it would have twelve floors. As a result of the extra floor being added during construction, the elevators do not reach the top floor.

The Huntsville Times occupied the building from the building's opening in 1928 until 1956 when it relocated to a new facility on Memorial Parkway.

From the 1970s until forced to relocate in the late 1980s, the building was home to two public radio stations, WLRH (in the basement) and the commercial radio station WAHR (which billed itself as broadcasting from "The Top of the Times").
