= Steger–Nance House =

Historic house in Alabama, United States

- Steger House
- U.S. National Register of Historic Places
- Alabama Register of Landmarks and Heritage
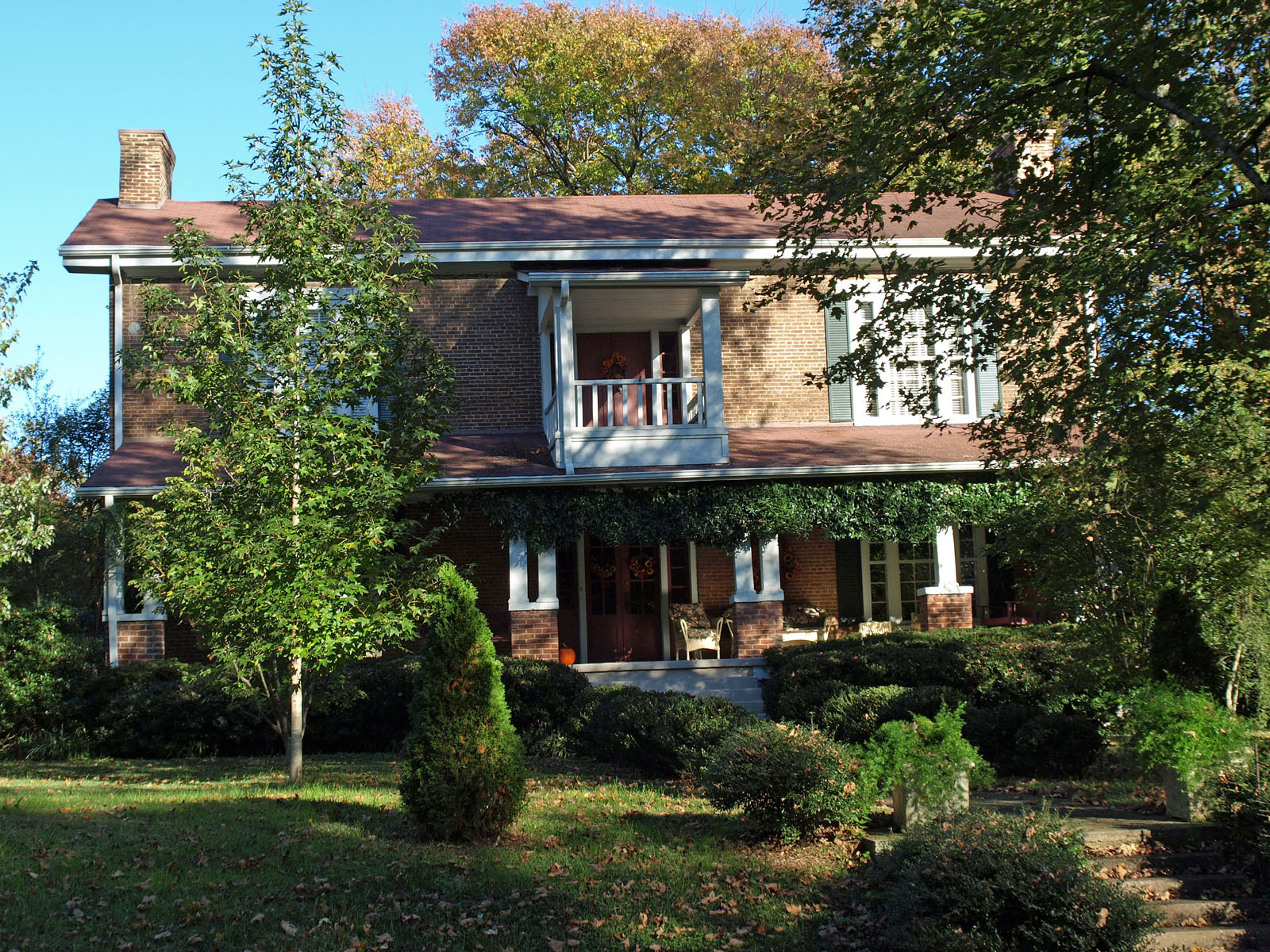
- The house in October 2011

- Location within Alabama Location within the United States
- Location: Maysville, Alabama
- Coordinates: 34°46′17″N 86°25′46″W
- Area: 3.5 acres (1.4 ha)
- Built: 1854
- Architectural style: Federal
- NRHP reference No.: 82002055

Significant dates
- Added to NRHP: June 1, 1982
- Designated ARLH: September 24, 1981

The Steger–Nance House (also known as the Dr. Howard Place) is a historic residence in Maysville, Alabama. It was built in 1854 by physician Francis Epps Harris Steger. Later owners included another physician, Issac William Howard, and local cotton gin owner and farmer Harry F. Nance. The house is built in a Federal style of brick laid in common bond. The house originally had a central hall flanked by a drawing room and parlor, with a dining room behind the parlor in an ell. A kitchen, bathroom, center hall, sitting room, and patio were added to the rear of the house in 1950. The house has three chimneys in each of the gable ends. Windows on the façade are nine-over-nine sashes flanked by narrow three-over-three sashes. A shed roofed porch stretches across the front, supported by six pairs of square columns on brick pillars. A narrow balcony, accessed from the upstairs hall, is centered above the front door. The house was listed on the Alabama Register of Landmarks and Heritage in 1981 and the National Register of Historic Places in 1982.
