= W. T. Hutchens Building =

- U.S. National Register of Historic Places
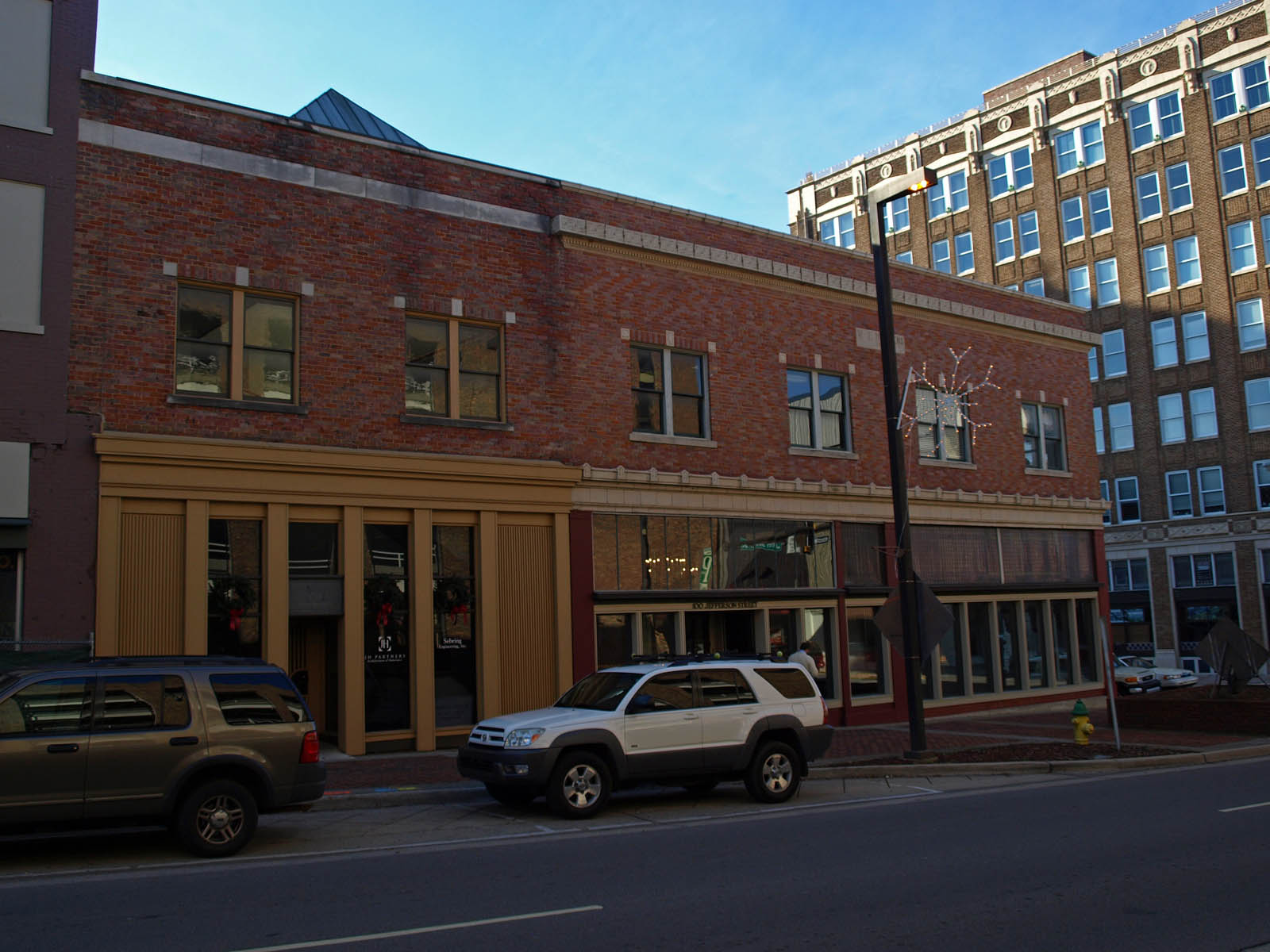
- The building in December 2009

- Location within Huntsville, Alabama Location within Alabama Location within the United States
- Location: 100-104 S. Jefferson St., Huntsville, Alabama
- Coordinates: 34°43′51″N 86°35′12″W
- Area: less than one acre
- Built: 1916
- Architectural style: Early Commercial
- MPS: Downtown Huntsville MRA
- NRHP reference No.: 83004374
- Added to NRHP: December 28, 1983

The W. T. Hutchens Building is a historic commercial building in Huntsville, Alabama, United States. A three-bay building on the corner of Jefferson Street and Clinton Avenue, the two corner bays were built in 1916 and the third built in a nearly identical style in 1921. It was built in the Early Commercial brick style, which departed from highly ornamented, vertically-oriented Victorian styles, instead emphasizing horizontal orientation by using strong horizontal courses and shorter, wider windows. It contrasts with the later Terry Hutchens Building, across Clinton Avenue, which is representative of later, again vertically-oriented Gothic Revival styles.

The two-story structure was built with retail space on the ground floor and offices and (in the case of the south bay), apartments on the second. The ground floor has large display windows which are modern replacements; originally, the corner bays were divided into two storefronts, separated by a sidewalk door leading to the second floor. Above the windows, the corner unit retains its original Luxfer prism windows, while the middle bay's have been replaced with panes of regular glass. A wide band of decorated terra cotta separates the two floors. Upstairs windows are paired one-over-one sashes, with lintels made of brick with terra cotta blocks. A terra cotta cornice projects from the façade. The ground floor of the south unit has been modified with tall windows between heavy wooden pilasters. A wooden molding joins the corner units' terra cotta molding, which together with a row of ashlar on the cornice gives continuity to the new and old portions of the building.

The building was listed on the National Register of Historic Places in 1983.
