= Herbert Cowell =

American architect

Herbert Cowell (1858–1943) was an American architect who lived in Joliet, Illinois. He designed residences in Plainfield, Illinois. He also worked in Huntsville, Alabama for several years before returning to Illinois.

He lived in Huntsville from about 1900 until 1904. Edgar Lee Love began his career as an assistant to Cowell in Huntsville.

== Work ==
=== Huntsville, Alabama ===
- Van Valkenburg House at 501 Franklin Street
- Sscond East Clinton Street School (demolished)
- Struve-Hay commercial building at Jefferson and Holmes streets

=== Illinois ===
- Vernette Wraith House (1924), a 1-story tan brick Craftsman / Prairie style bungalow in Joliet
- 609 Western Avenue in Joliet
- Struve-Hay Building, 117-123 N. Jefferson Street in Huntsville, Alabama. NRHP listed
- 603 Franklin Street in Huntsville
- Fletcher Lowe House 210 Williams

== See also ==
- Twickenham Historic District
- Old Town Historic District (Huntsville, Alabama)
