= Everett Building (Huntsville, Alabama) =

- U.S. National Register of Historic Places
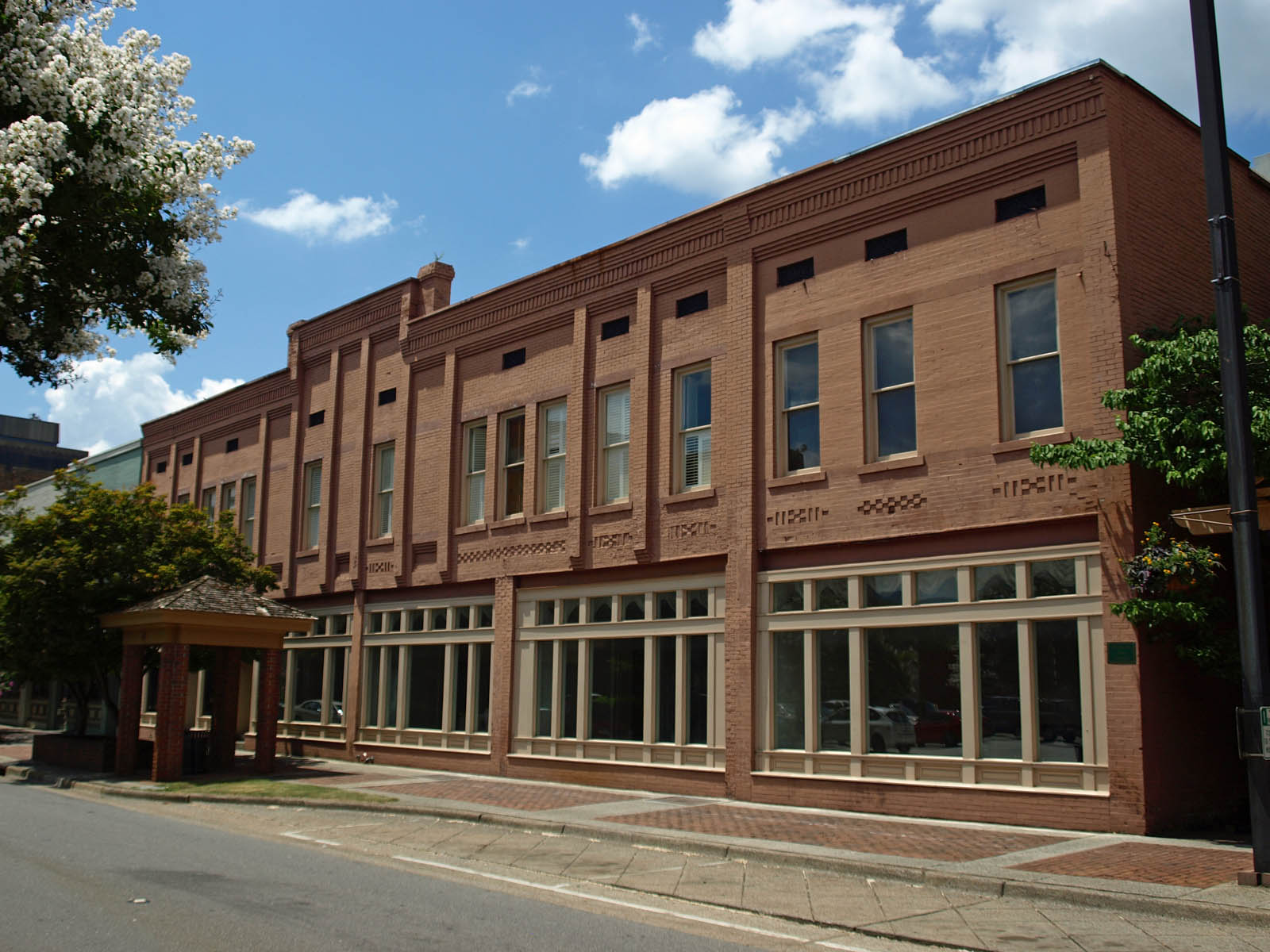
- The building in July 2010

- Location within Huntsville, Alabama Location within Alabama Location within the United States
- Location: 115-123 N. Washington St., Huntsville, Alabama
- Coordinates: 34°43′56″N 86°35′10″W
- Area: less than one acre
- Built: 1899
- Architectural style: Commercial Brick
- MPS: Downtown Huntsville MRA
- NRHP reference No.: 80000709
- Added to NRHP: September 22, 1980

The Everett Building is a historic commercial building in Huntsville, Alabama. Built in 1899, it represents the Commercial Brick style of the late 1800s and early 1900s that eschewed the applied decoration of the Victorian style. The two-story building is divided into five storefronts, although only the southernmost two have entrances today. The upper floor is divided by pilasters between tightly spaced, one-over-one sash windows. Decorative patterned reliefs sit below each window. The building is topped with a parapet that has a course of dentils between courses of stepped brick. The center part of the parapet is raised, and flanked by a short, capped column pieces. The northern bay is visually separated from the others by a pilaster stretching the entire height of the building, and was formerly left unpainted, suggesting it may have been built at another time. A covered, tree-lined alley separates the building from the Yarbrough Hotel to the north. The building was listed on the National Register of Historic Places in 1980.
