= McCartney–Bone House =

Historic house in Alabama, United States

- U.S. National Register of Historic Places
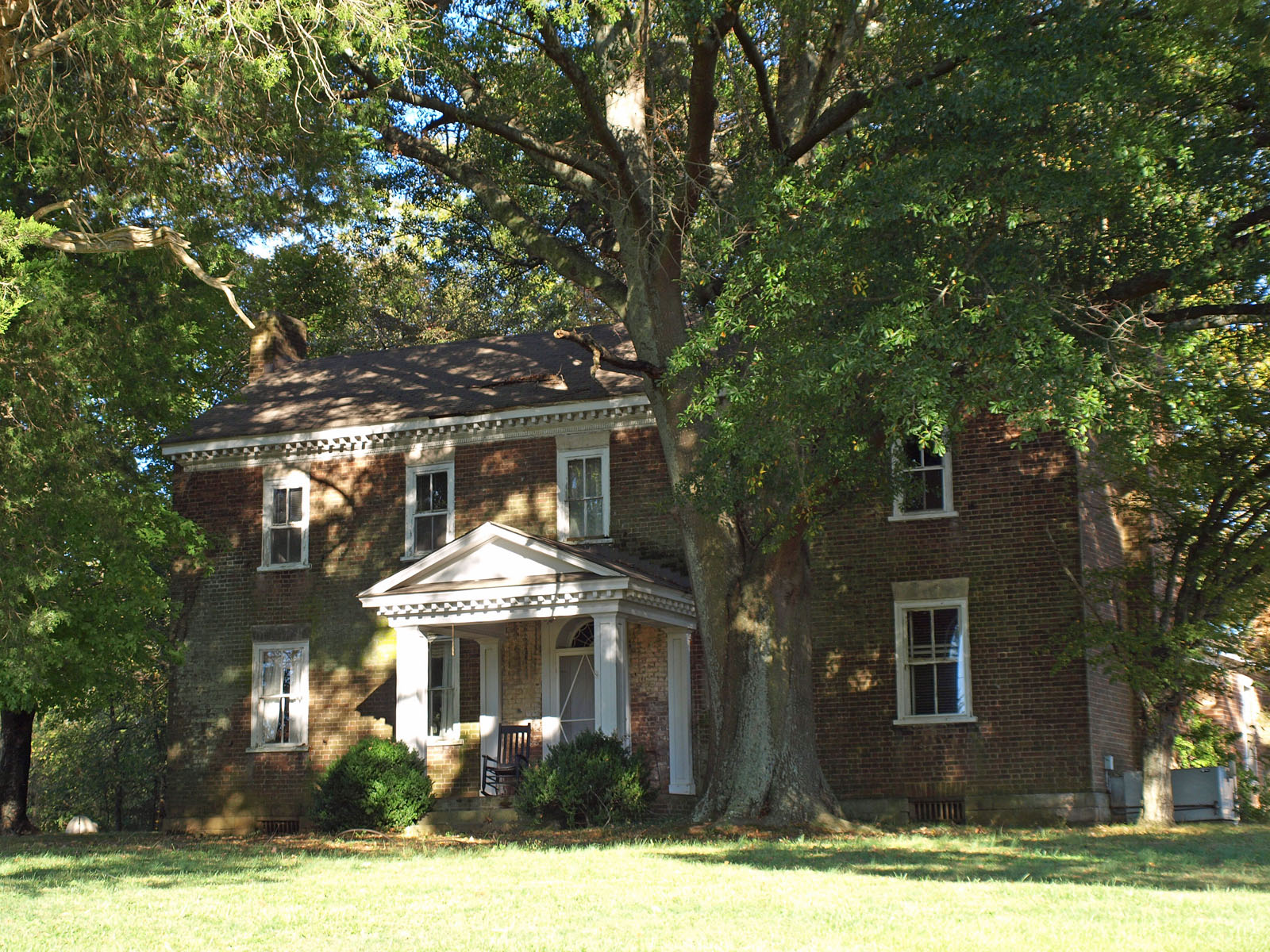
- The house in October 2011

- Location within Alabama Location within the United States
- Nearest city: Maysville, Alabama
- Coordinates: 34°47′39″N 86°24′32″W
- Area: 2.8 acres (1.1 ha)
- Built: 1826
- Built by: McCartney, James
- Architectural style: Georgian, Federal
- NRHP reference No.: 77000213
- Added to NRHP: December 16, 1977

The McCartney–Bone House (also known as the Bone–Wilbourn House and McCartney–Bone–Wilbourn House) is a historic residence near Maysville in Madison County, Alabama. The house was built in 1826 by James McCartney, who came to Madison County in 1810. McCartney held several public offices in the county, including Justice of the Peace, Tax Assessor and Collector, and County Commissioner. He was also a member of the Flint River Navigation Company, which sought to improve transportation along the Flint River to the Tennessee River, making it easier to get goods from northeastern Madison County to market. McCartney died in 1831, and his wife, Martha, remarried twice, the second time to Reverend Matthew H. Bone. After Martha's death in 1885, the house remained in the family until 1955.

The brickwork is laid in Flemish bond, and is of the same high quality on all sides of the house. The house is two stories, with a gable roof and a chimney in each gable end. A central entry portico, added in the 1960s, is supported by two square columns with matching pilasters against the house. The door is topped with an elliptical fanlight. A pair of two-over-two sash windows flank the portico on either side. Second floor windows are also two-over-two, but are slightly smaller. All windows on the façade have recessed lintels filled with stucco. A denticulated cornice with ogee modillions is repeated on the rear of the house, an unusual feature for an early 19th-century country house. The main portion of the house has two rooms on either side of a central hall on both floors. The house originally had a detached kitchen; it was rebuilt in 1873 to be closer to the house and later joined. A shed roofed veranda on the rear has been enclosed to form a sun porch.

The house was listed on the National Register of Historic Places in 1977.
