= Edmonton Heights Historic District =

Historic district in Huntsville, Alabama

- U.S. National Register of Historic Places
- U.S. Historic district
- Interactive map of Edmonton Heights Historic District
- Location: Huntsville, Alabama
- Coordinates: 34°46′35″N 86°34′02″W
- Built: 1959–1966
- NRHP reference No.: 100006659
- Added to NRHP: June 21, 2021

The Edmonton Heights Historic District is a historic district in Huntsville, Alabama. The neighborhood was constructed between 1959 and 1975, with houses sold only to African Americans in segregated Alabama. Platted near the historically Black Alabama A&M University, it was built in the midst of Huntsville's population boom driven by Redstone Arsenal and the Marshall Space Flight Center. The majority of the houses are modest, 3-bedroom / 1-bathroom homes, built in popular styles of the mid-20th century. A majority of the houses are Ranch-style, which were built throughout the neighborhood's construction, while others are Mid-century modern (built primarily in 1960–61) or Minimal Traditional (primarily 1961–63).

The district was listed on the National Register of Historic Places in 2021.
