= Schiffman Building =

- U.S. National Register of Historic Places
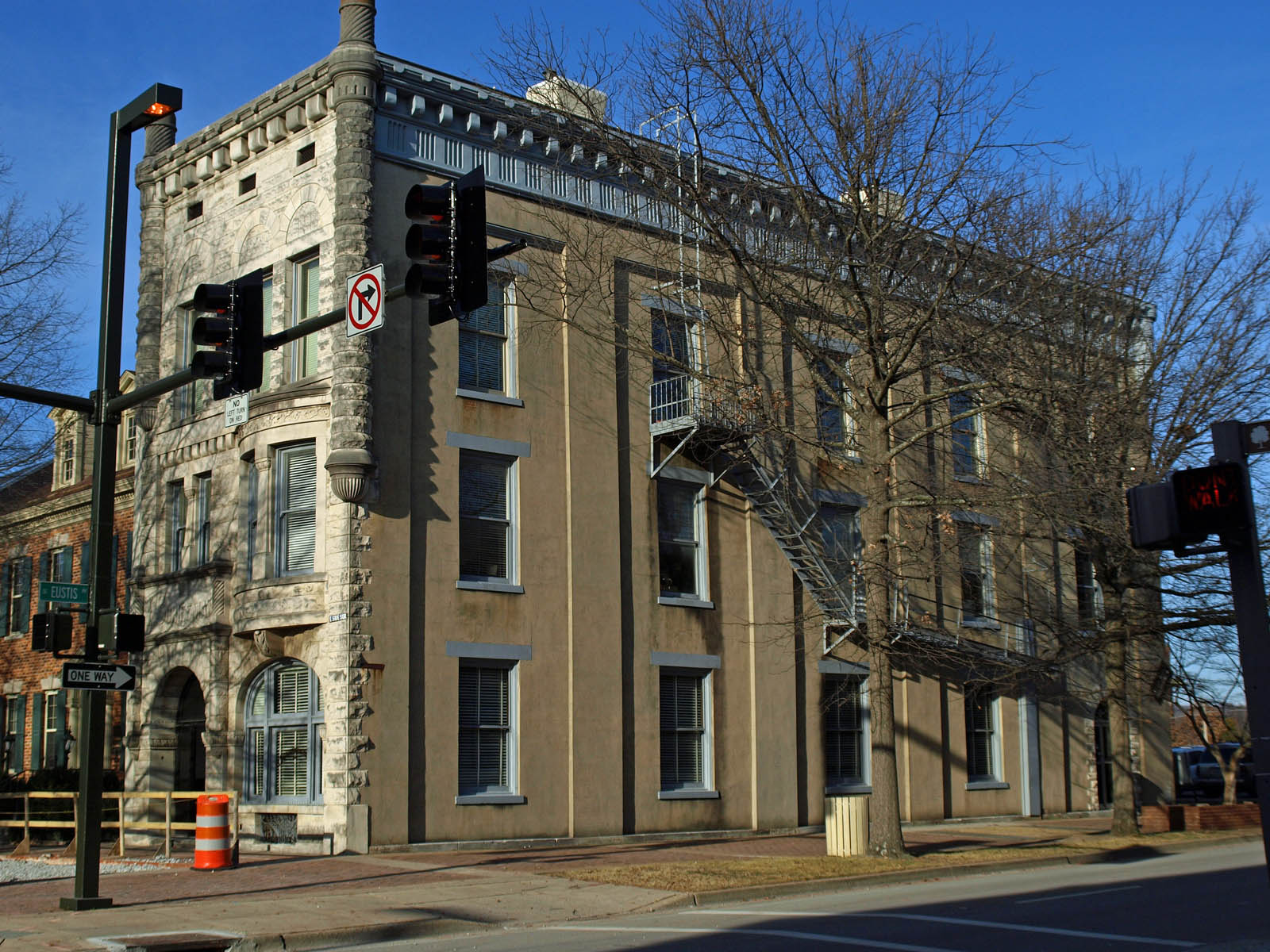
- The building in December 2009

- Location within Huntsville, Alabama Location within Alabama Location within the United States
- Location: 231 E. Side Sq., Huntsville, Alabama
- Coordinates: 34°43′49″N 86°35′3″W
- Area: less than one acre
- Built: circa 1835–1861
- Architectural style: Romanesque
- MPS: Downtown Huntsville MRA
- NRHP reference No.: 80000724
- Added to NRHP: September 22, 1980

The Schiffman Building is a historic commercial building in Huntsville, Alabama. The main structure of the building was built in 1845. Originally, it was a three-bay brick building divided by large, flat pilasters. The southern bay, at the corner of East Side Square and Eustis Avenue, was remodeled in the Richardsonian Romanesque style in 1895. The other two bays were demolished in the 1970s. Future Speaker of the U.S. House William B. Bankhead used the building as an office while he was Huntsville's city attorney from 1898–1902; his daughter, actress Tallulah Bankhead, was born in the second floor apartment. Issac Schiffman, a businessman and banker, purchased the building in 1905 and it has remained in the family since.

The façade is of rough limestone blocks, and is dominated by turrets on the corners that extend above the cornice. The arched entry sits beside a large, arched window on the first floor. The window's keystone acts as a corbel for a massive bay window on the second floor. Above the door is a stone panel, flanked by turrets and marked with "I. Schiffman". Above the panel are two small windows and a smaller version of the cornice. Three windows on the third floor, two above the bay window and one above the door side, each have a decorative stone arch above a single lintel. The stone cornice has large dentils; the same design is carried down the Eustis side of the building on a pressed metal cornice. The side is faced with stuccoed brick and divided into five bays by protruding pilasters. Each bay has a one-over-one sash window on each floor, with the final bay containing a door surrounded by a stone arch. The building was listed on the National Register of Historic Places in 1980.
