= Yarbrough Hotel =

- U.S. National Register of Historic Places
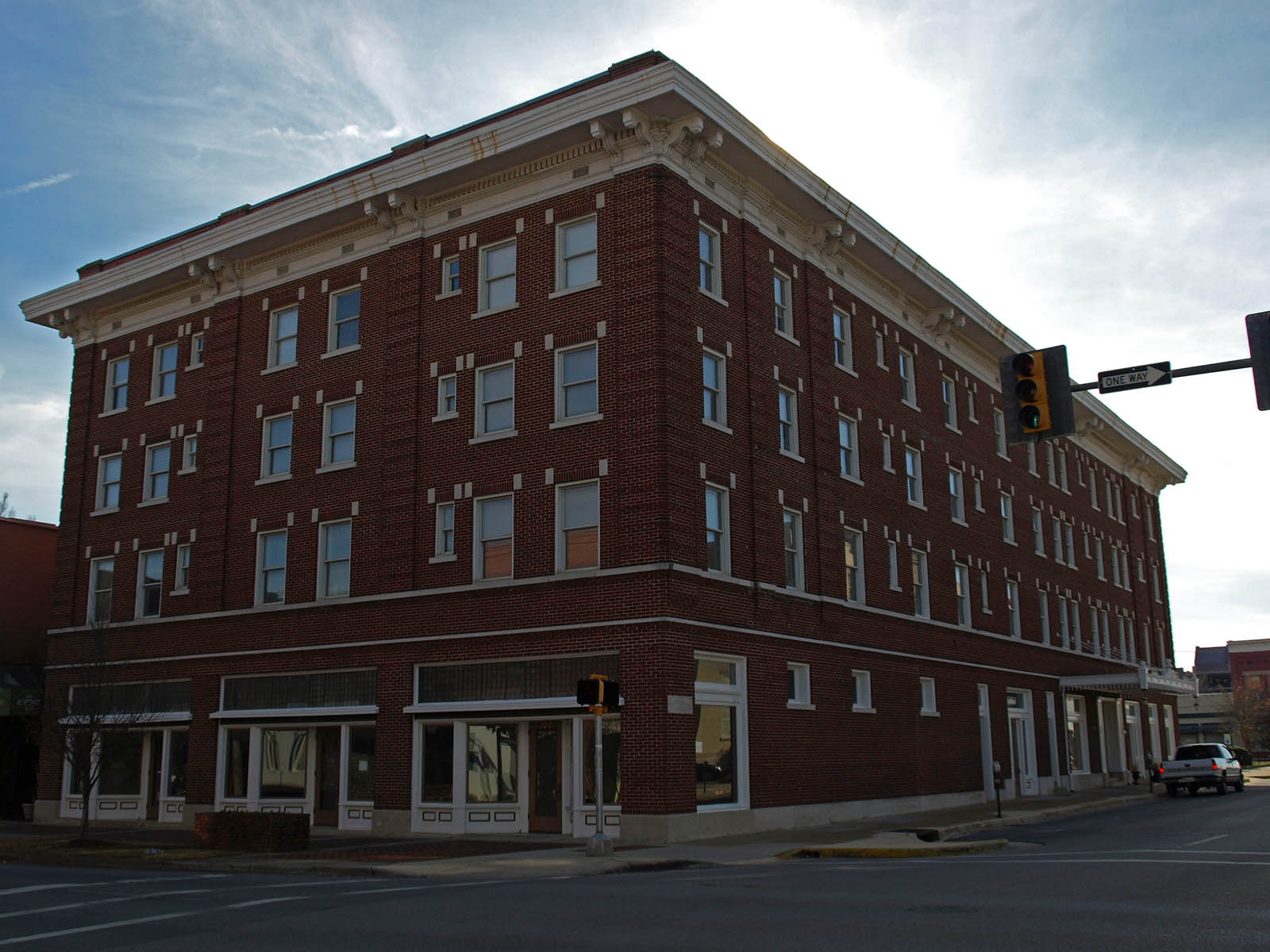
- The building in December 2009

- Location within Huntsville, Alabama Location within Alabama Location within the United States
- Location: 127-129 N. Washington St., Huntsville, Alabama
- Coordinates: 34°43′56″N 86°35′11″W
- Area: less than one acre
- Built: 1922
- Architect: D. Anderson Dickey
- MPS: Downtown Huntsville MRA
- NRHP reference No.: 80000727
- Added to NRHP: September 22, 1980

The Yarbrough Hotel is a historic building in Huntsville, Alabama. The four-story structure was built of brick and reinforced concrete in 1922–25. The top three floors contain 75 rooms, while the ground floor features the hotel lobby and storefronts; as it did not have a ballroom or party rooms, it catered to businessmen. It faced competition from the Twickenham Hotel one block away, and the Russel Erskine Hotel (opened 1930). Yarbrough operated as a residential hotel until the late 1950s, and was renovated in the 1980s.

The building stretches 70 feet (21 m) along Washington Street and 152 feet (46 m) on Holmes Avenue. The ground floor is separated from the upper floors by two string courses of stone. Flat brick pilasters divide the façade into bays. Double brackets at the top of each pilaster support a deep pressed metal cornice, with a row of dentils below. Windows on the upper floors are one-over-one sashes, each topped with a row of soldier course brick with a stone block at each corner. Each bay is two windows wide, except for the two end bays on the Holmes side, which are one window wide. The lobby entrance is on the Holmes side, which is covered by an elaborate metal awning. Several storefronts line the Holmes façade at irregular intervals. The Washington Street side is divided into three bays, each with an identical recessed door flanked by large display windows. Shallow awnings stretch across each opening, under a block of small window panes.

The building was listed on the National Register of Historic Places in 1980.

As of March 2025, the building's primary occupant is a Huntsville-based law firm.
