= White–Turner–Sanford House =

Historic house in Alabama, United States

- U.S. National Register of Historic Places
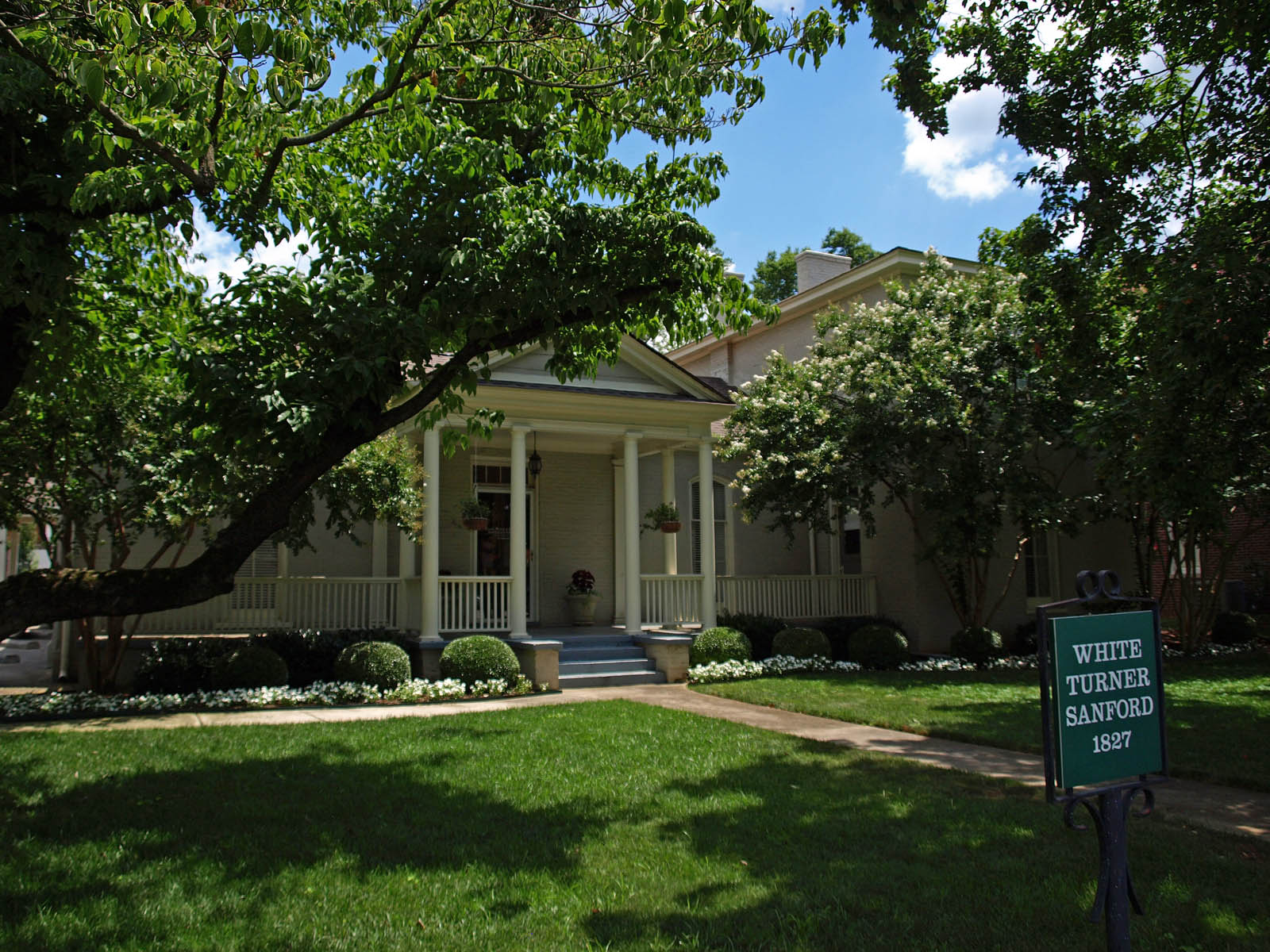
- The house in July 2010

- Location within Huntsville, Alabama Location within Alabama Location within the United States
- Location: 601 Madison St., Huntsville, Alabama
- Coordinates: 34°43′33″N 86°34′56″W
- Area: 1 acre (0.40 ha)
- Built: 1827
- Architectural style: Greek Revival, Federal
- NRHP reference No.: 84000655
- Added to NRHP: April 12, 1984

The White–Turner–Sanford House is a historic residence in Huntsville, Alabama, US. It was built in 1827 by James White, a merchant from Virginia, on land purchased from LeRoy Pope. The home has had numerous owners through the years including John H. Lewis, mayor from 1826 to 1828, and state representative George W. Lane. Originally a one-story Federal-style house, a two-story Greek Revival addition was built in 1858. The original part of the house consists of a center-hall main block with an ell. It is built of brick laid in common bond, with a gable roof. A portico supported by four thin columns covers the main entrance, which has a four-panel transom. Windows on the main block are the original rectangular sashes, except the windows on the façade which were modified with segmental arched tops to match the addition. The original portion contains a hall flanked by a parlor and reception room, with two bedrooms behind the parlor. A porch, kitchen and bath filling in the ell were added after the Civil War. The addition has a study and dining room on the ground floor and two bedrooms above.

The house was listed on the National Register of Historic Places in 1984. It has been converted into a financial planning office.
