= Donegan Block =

- U.S. National Register of Historic Places
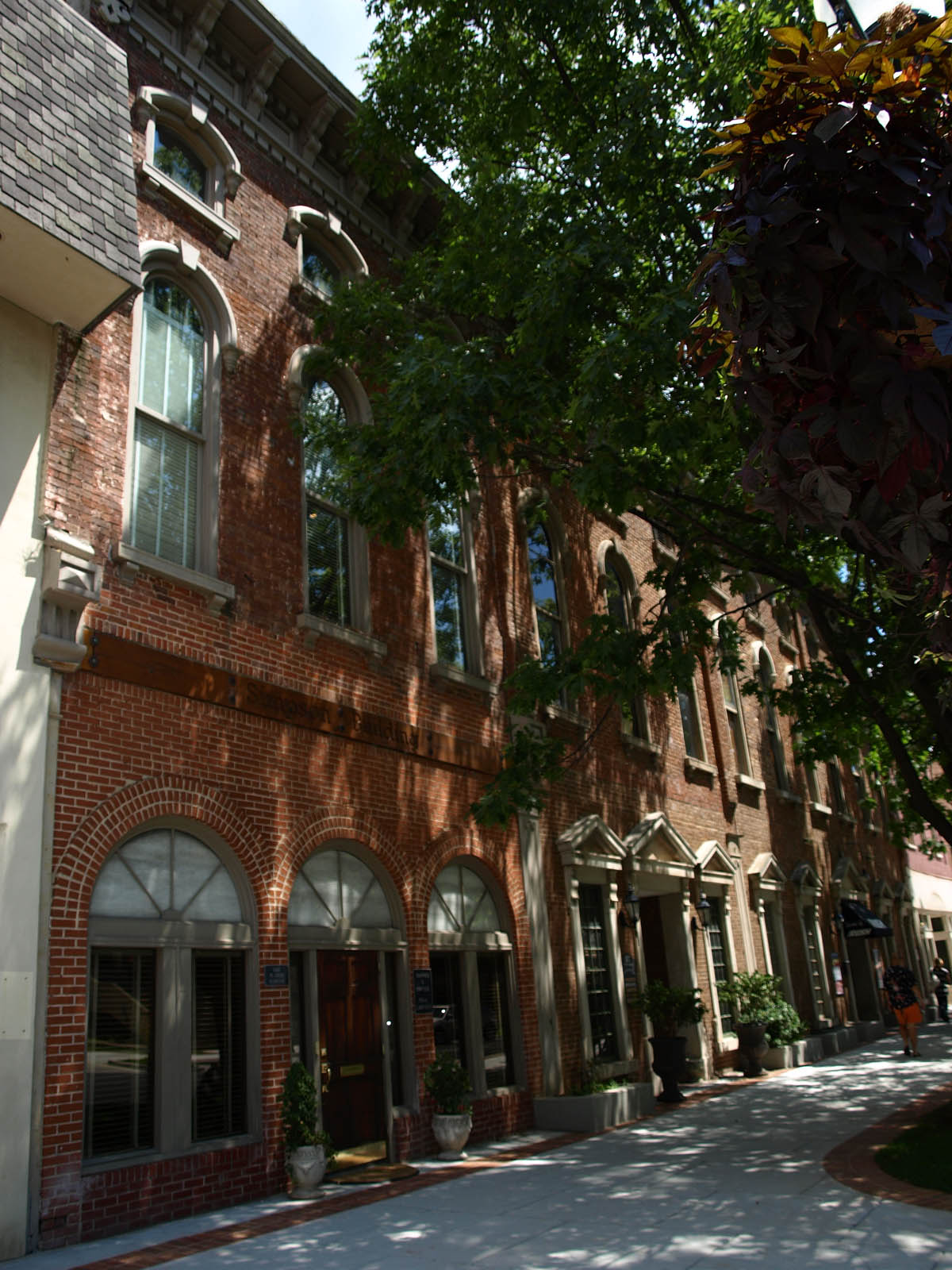
- The building in July 2010

- Location within Huntsville, Alabama Location within Alabama Location within the United States
- Location: 105-109 N. Side Sq., Huntsville, Alabama
- Coordinates: 34°43′51″N 86°35′8.5″W
- Area: less than one acre
- Built: 1870
- Architectural style: Italianate, Italianate Revival
- MPS: Downtown Huntsville MRA
- NRHP reference No.: 80000706
- Added to NRHP: September 22, 1980

The Donegan Block is a historic commercial building in Huntsville, Alabama. Built in 1870, it and the adjacent building, the Rand Building, represent a simplified Italianate architecture style common in smaller towns in the late 19th century. It is one of few remaining Italianate buildings which once were prevalent on Courthouse Square. The 2 1/2-story building is divided into four units, each three bays wide. The units are divided on the façade by brick pilasters, which were originally faced with cast iron on the ground floor. The two eastern units are combined, and share an entrance flanked by two multi-paned fixed windows on each side. The other two units have central entrances with one window on each side. The three eastern units are treated similarly, with triangular pediments and pilasters surrounding each door and window. The western unit had been modified with a recessed entry and windows, but these were later returned flush with the building and are topped with fanlights and segmental brick arches. Second floor windows on all four units are tall and narrow with arched tops and roll moldings with keystones. The attic level has short vents treated similarly to the second floor windows. A bracketed and denticulated metal cornice projects from the top of the building. It was listed on the National Register of Historic Places in 1980.
