= Rand Building (Huntsville, Alabama) =

- U.S. National Register of Historic Places
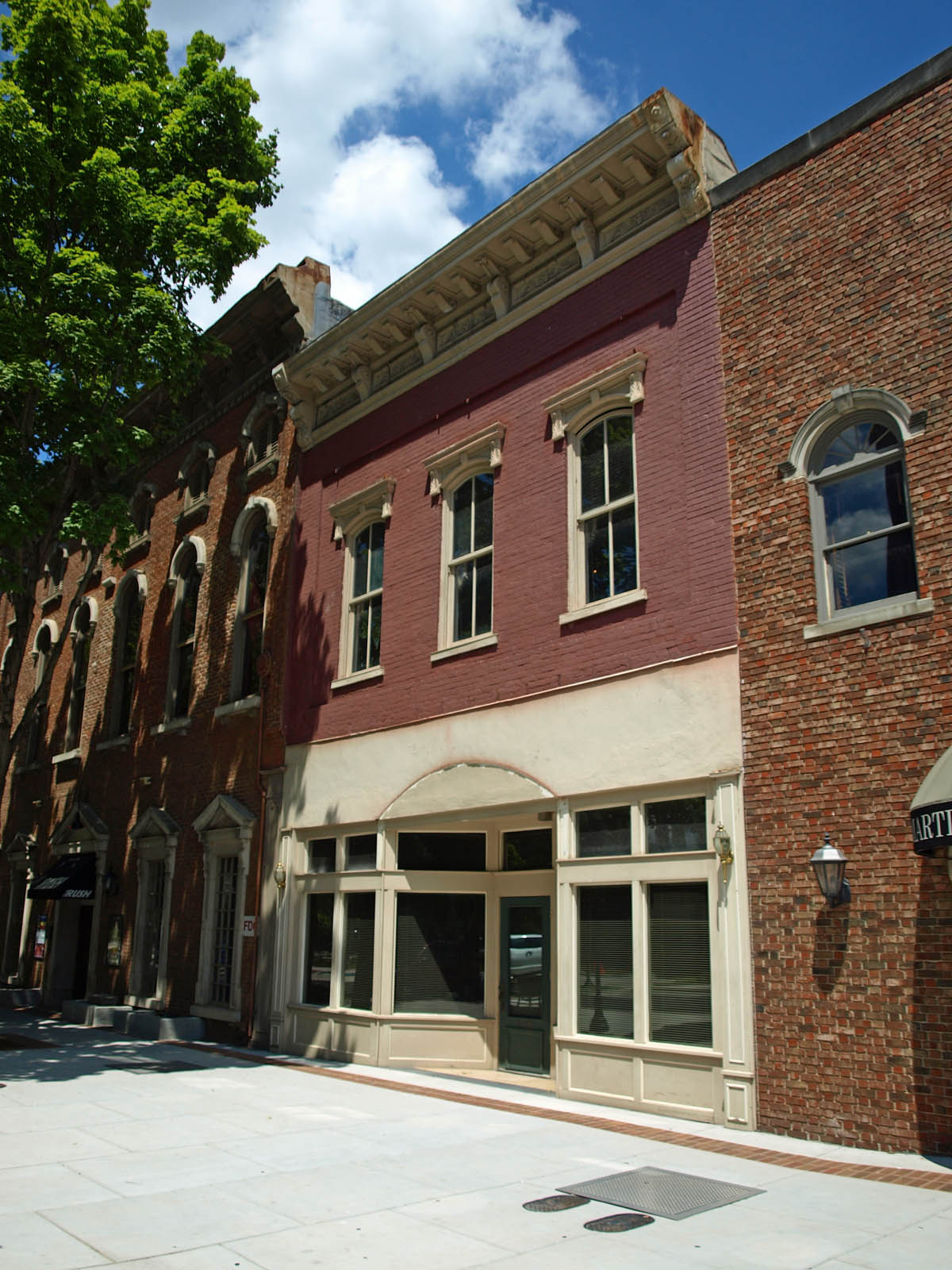
- The building in July 2010

- Location within Huntsville, Alabama Location within Alabama Location within the United States
- Location: 113 N. Side Sq., Huntsville, Alabama
- Coordinates: 34°43′51″N 86°35′7.75″W
- Area: less than one acre
- Built: 1883
- Architectural style: Italianate, Italianate Revival
- MPS: Downtown Huntsville MRA
- NRHP reference No.: 80000722
- Added to NRHP: September 22, 1980

The Rand Building is a historic commercial building in Huntsville, Alabama. Built in 1883, it and the adjacent building, the Donegan Block, represent a simplified Italianate architecture style common in smaller towns in the late 19th century. It is one of few remaining Italianate buildings which once were prevalent on Courthouse Square. The two-story green-painted brick building has an elaborate bracketed metal cornice with decorative panels between the brackets. The street-level façade has large four-pane fixed windows supported by paneled bulkheads, with a central recessed entry. A second row of smaller windows runs above the first, below a smoothed concrete header panel which along which an awning runs the width of the building. On the second floor, three two-over-two sash windows with segmental arched tops are in a frame recessed one course from the rest of the building. It was listed on the National Register of Historic Places in 1980.
