= 105 South Washington Street =

- Building at 105 S. Washington Street
- U.S. National Register of Historic Places
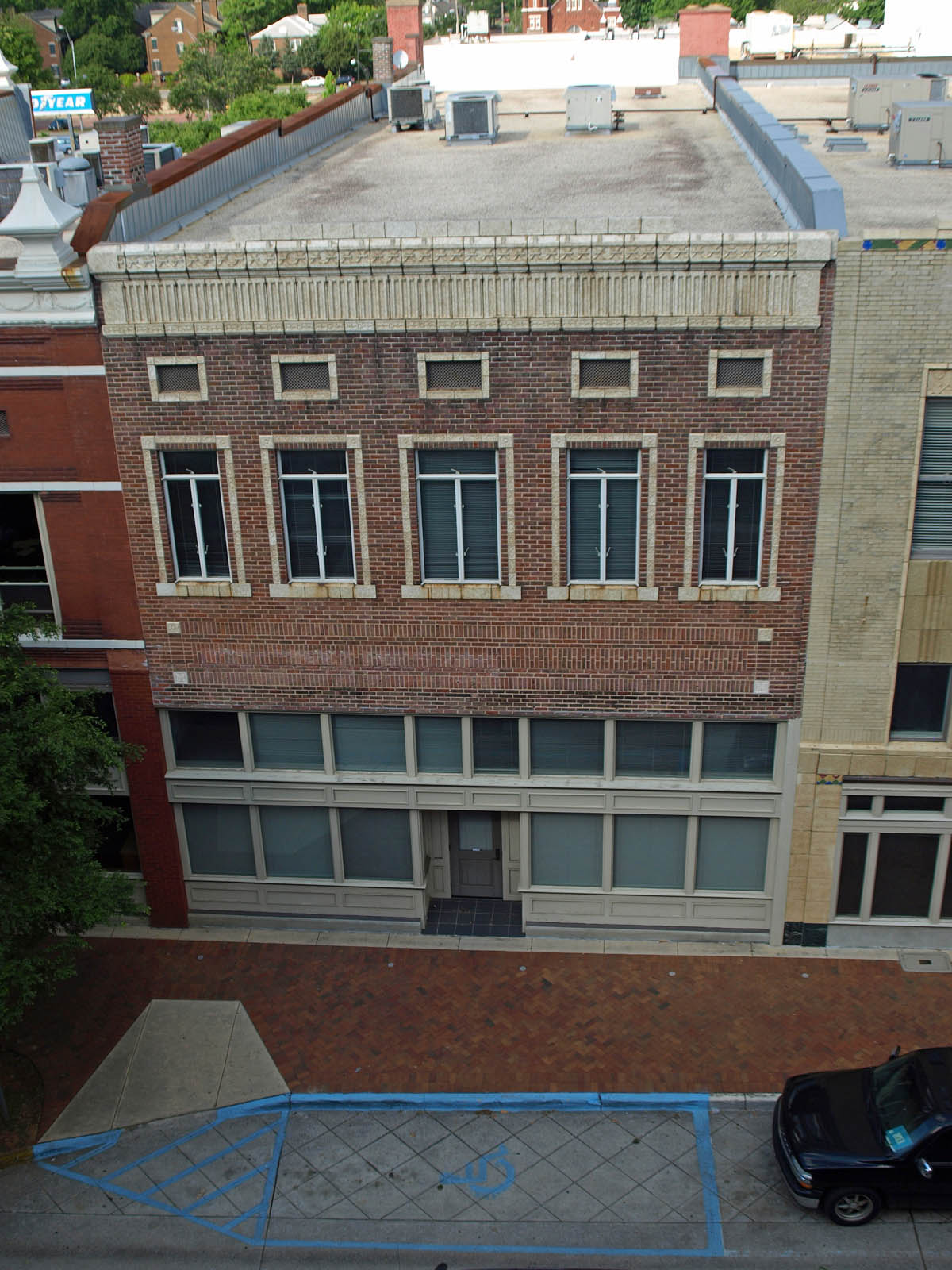
- The building in May 2011

- Location within Huntsville, Alabama Location within Alabama Location within the United States
- Location: 105 S. Washington St., Huntsville, Alabama
- Coordinates: 34°43′54″N 86°35′7″W
- Area: less than one acre
- Built: 1931
- Architectural style: Art Deco
- MPS: Downtown Huntsville MRA
- NRHP reference No.: 84000653
- Added to NRHP: May 23, 1984

105 South Washington Street in Huntsville, Alabama, is a historic commercial building. It was built in 1931, after the previous building on the site had burned in 1925. The street level of the two-story brick building has three single-pane windows on either side of a recessed entry. A row of similar windows runs above the street level, separated by a row of rectangular panels. Above the storefront level sits a panel of soldier course bricks, with decorative terra cotta floral blocks on the corners. The same blocks are used on the top corners of the surrounds for five windows above. The frieze is terra cotta, with a series of narrow flutes above a decorative bed-mould chain. The cornice features a geometric X-pattern with small dentils on each block. The terra cotta detailing exhibits Art Deco influence, popular at the time the building was constructed. The building was listed on the National Register of Historic Places in 1984.
