= McThornmor Acres Subdivision Historic District =

Historic district in Huntsville, Alabama

- U.S. National Register of Historic Places
- U.S. Historic district
- Interactive map of McThornmor Acres Subdivision Historic District
- Location: Huntsville, Alabama
- Coordinates: 34°43′51″N 86°37′53″W
- Built: 1956–1969
- NRHP reference No.: 100004119
- Added to NRHP: February 9, 2022

The McThornmor Acres Subdivision Historic District is a historic district in Huntsville, Alabama. The neighborhood was built between 1956 and 1969 in an area annexed into the city in 1955. Its construction coincided with a boom in the city's population driven by Redstone Arsenal and the Marshall Space Flight Center. The neighborhood contains 208 houses, most of which are brick veneer Ranch-style houses, although two houses feature Colonial Revival details, two are split-levels, and two are Mid-century modern.

The district was listed on the National Register of Historic Places in 2022.
