= Monte Sano Railroad Workers' House =

Historic house in Alabama, United States

- U.S. National Register of Historic Places
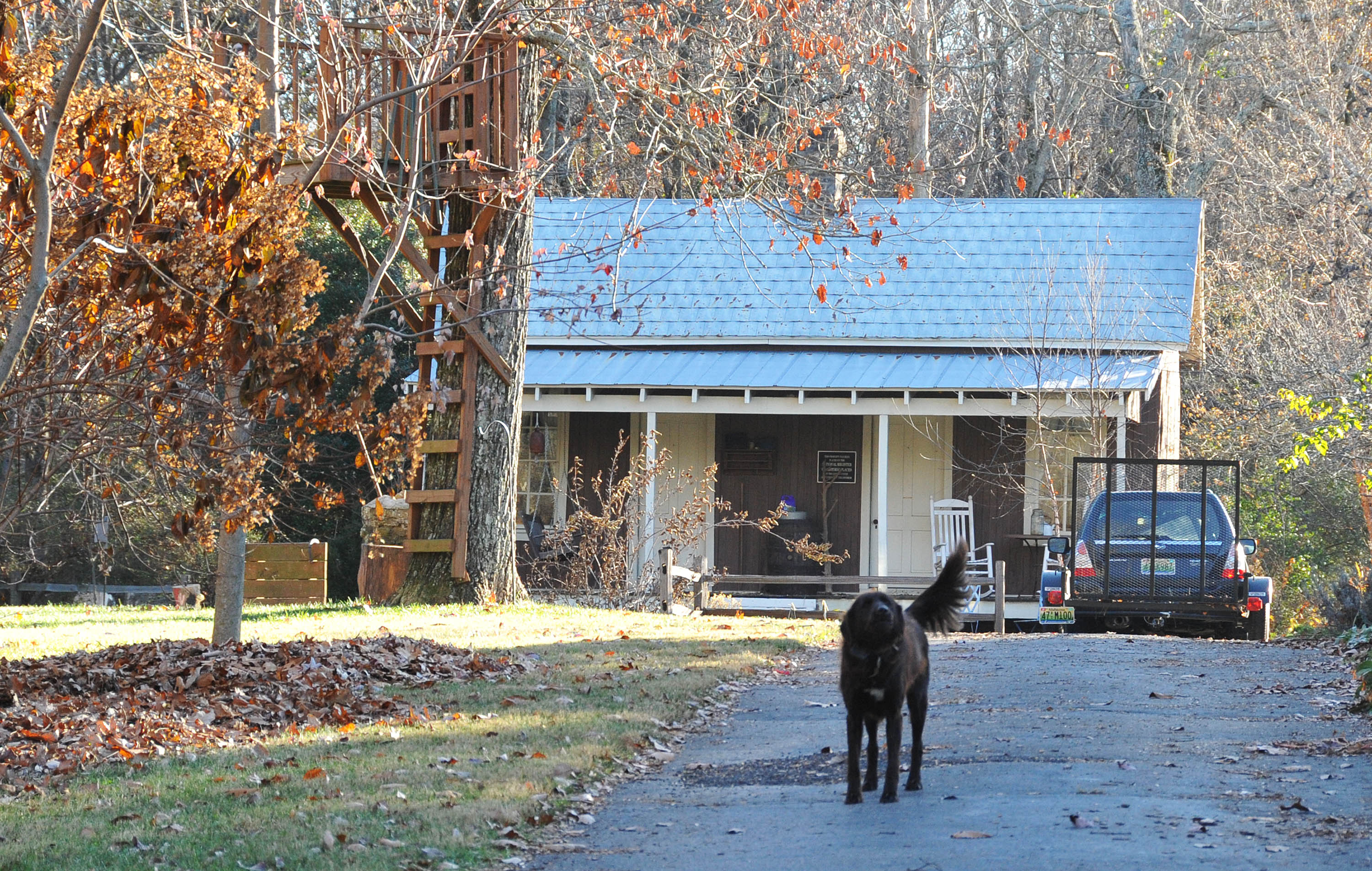

- Location within Huntsville, Alabama Location within Alabama Location within the United States
- Location: 4119 Shelby Ave., Huntsville, Alabama
- Coordinates: 34°44′29″N 86°31′26″W
- Area: 1 acre (0.40 ha)
- Built: 1888
- Architectural style: Saddlebag
- NRHP reference No.: 98001019
- Added to NRHP: August 14, 1998

The Monte Sano Railroad Workers' House is a historic boarding house in Huntsville, Alabama, United States. Built in 1888, it is the only remaining building relating to the Monte Sano Hotel and Railroad. The North Alabama Improvement Company built the three-story, Queen Anne hotel on Monte Sano Mountain in 1887. The following year, construction began on a rail line connecting the hotel with the Memphis and Charleston Depot downtown. The house was constructed to house workers building and later operating the railroad.

The workers' house was originally a saddlebag plan building, consisting of two rooms sharing a central chimney. A shed roofed, two-room addition was added in 1925. The façade has two doors, flanked by two-over-two sash windows. The house is clad with board-and-batten siding, and topped with a gabled metal roof. The structure was modernized after 1997, and a shed-roof front porch added.

The hotel and railroad venture was not a financial success, and the railroad shut down in 1895, followed by the hotel in 1904. The house was listed on the National Register of Historic Places in 1998.
