= James H. Bibb House =

Historic house in Alabama, United States

- U.S. National Register of Historic Places
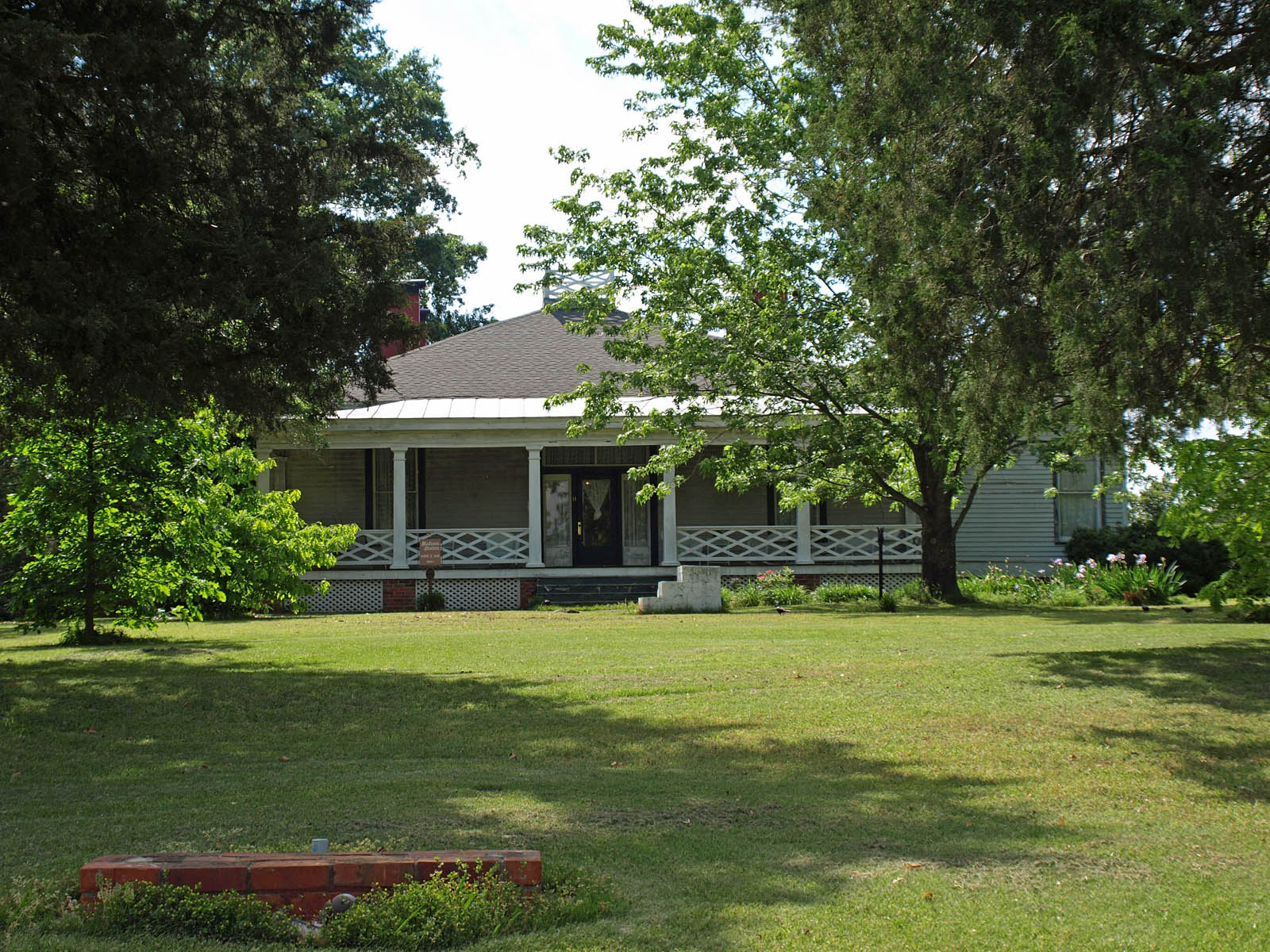
- The house in May 2011

- Location within Alabama Location within the United States
- Location: 11 Allen St., Madison, Alabama
- Coordinates: 34°41′33″N 86°45′13″W
- Area: 1.2 acres (0.49 ha)
- Built: 1867
- Architectural style: Greek Revival
- NRHP reference No.: 84000651
- Added to NRHP: April 12, 1984

The James H. Bibb House is a historic residence in Madison, Alabama. Bibb was an early landholder in Madison, one of the main proponents of its incorporation in 1869, and distant relative of Alabama's first two governors, William Wyatt Bibb and Thomas Bibb. In 1866, Bibb purchased 300 acres (120 ha) west of the Memphis and Charleston Railroad depot, farming corn and cotton himself on half of it and renting out the other half. He also owned a mercantile business and a steam-powered grist mill in the small town.

Bibb's house was built in 1867 in a simple Greek Revival style; this is in contrast to most contemporary houses in Madison, which were built in more current Victorian styles. The house is 50 feet (15 m) square with a pyramidal hip roof and is covered with poplar clapboards. A partial-hip roof porch, supported by six square columns, stretches across the entire front of the house. The main entrance is flanked by single-pane sidelights and topped with a twin-pane transom. The interior is laid out with a central hall and three rooms on either side. A shed roofed porch and a garage have been added to the rear of the house, and an addition containing a bedroom, bathroom, and porch was added to the north side.

The house was listed on the National Register of Historic Places in 1984.
