= Beckers Block =

- U.S. National Register of Historic Places
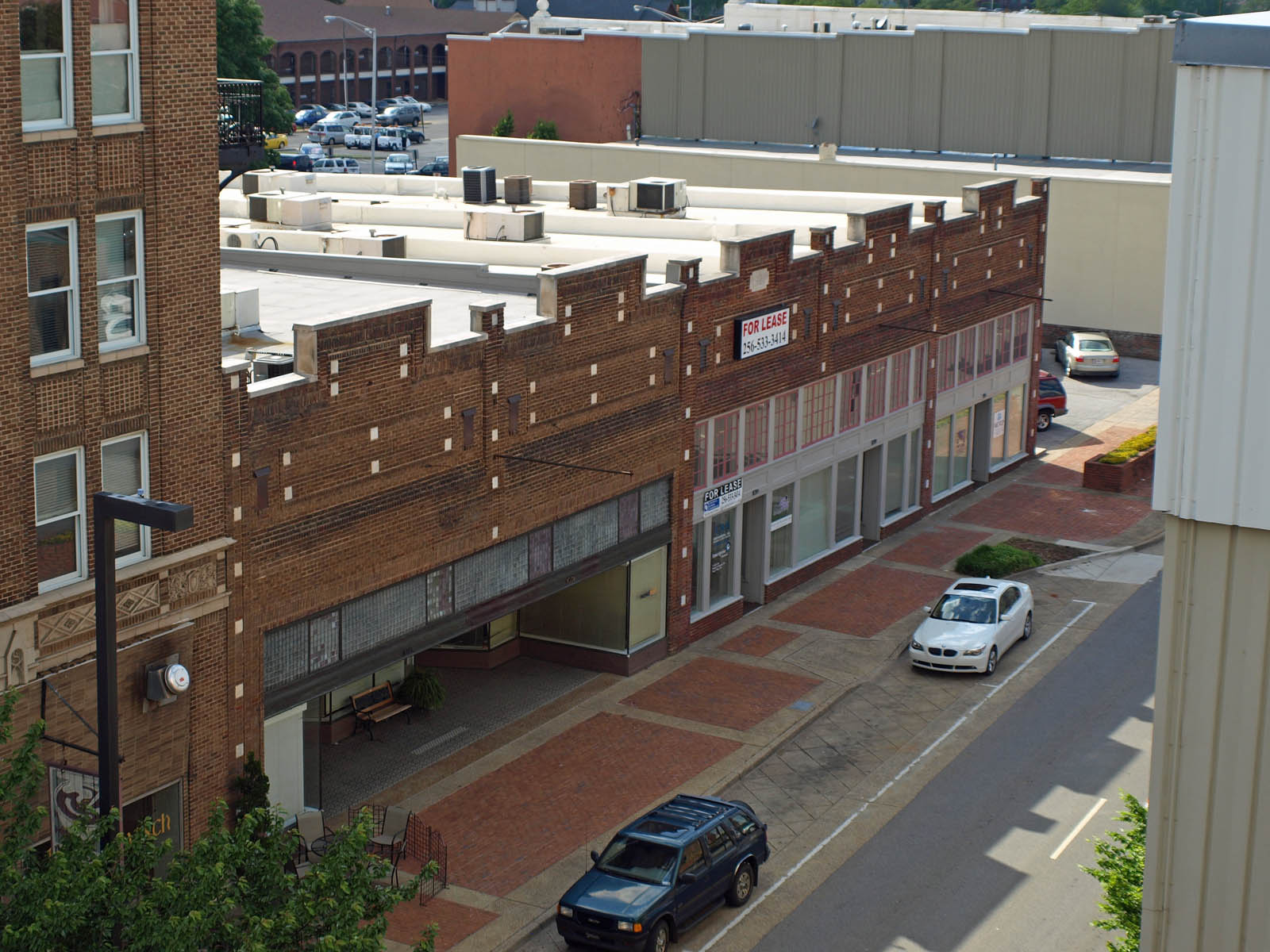
- Beckers Block in May 2011

- Location within Huntsville, Alabama Location within Alabama Location within the United States
- Location: 105-111 N. Jefferson St., Huntsville, Alabama
- Coordinates: 34°43′53″N 86°35′13″W
- Area: less than one acre
- Built: 1925
- Architectural style: Commercial Brick
- MPS: Downtown Huntsville MRA
- NRHP reference No.: 80000703
- Added to NRHP: September 22, 1980

Beckers Block is a group of historic commercial buildings in Huntsville, Alabama. The two-story, five-bay structure was built in 1925. Each bay is separated by piers that project above the roofline. The center of each bay is raised above the parapet, creating a crenelated appearance. Below the parapet, a rectangular panel is formed from header courses. Cream-colored square stones decorate the entire façade.

The two southern bays were built for a J. C. Penney store, and feature display windows on either side of a recessed entryway. A panel of glass block stretches above the entryway. The northern three bays have single-pane windows flush with the façade with recessed doors. A row of four-by-two paned windows, mostly in pairs and once in a triplet, stretch above the three bays.

The building was listed on the National Register of Historic Places in 1980.
