= Struve–Hay Building =

- U.S. National Register of Historic Places
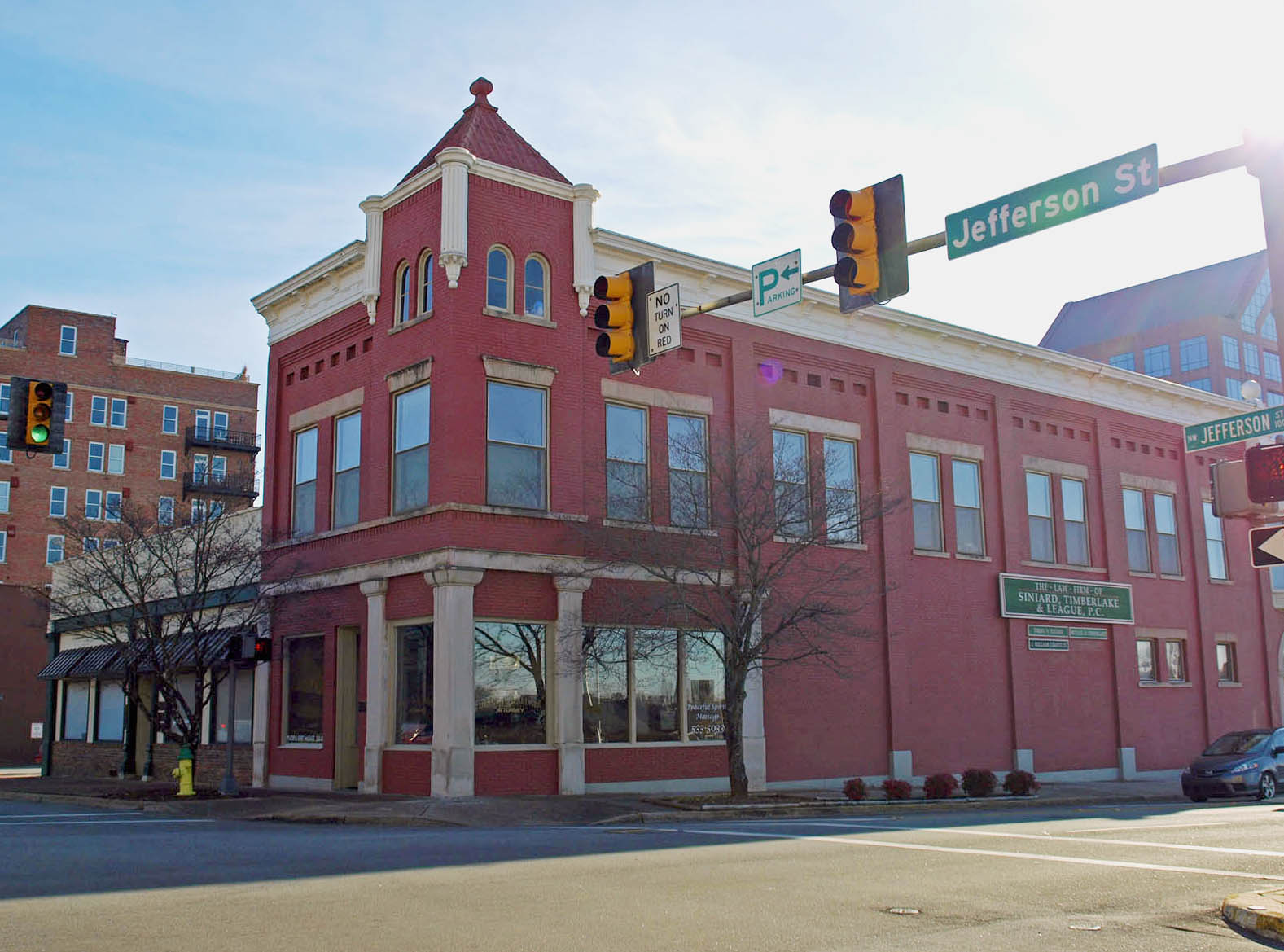
- The building in December 2009

- Location within Huntsville, Alabama Location within Alabama Location within the United States
- Location: 117-123 N. Jefferson St., Huntsville, Alabama
- Coordinates: 34°43′55″N 86°35′14″W
- Area: 2 acres (0.81 ha)
- Built: 1900
- Architect: Herbert Cowell
- MPS: Downtown Huntsville MRA
- NRHP reference No.: 80000725
- Added to NRHP: September 22, 1980

The Struve–Hay Building is a historic commercial building in Huntsville, Alabama. Built in 1900, it represents a transition between Victorian architecture style and the less ornamented Commercial Brick style. The building was originally two stories with a three-story tower on the corner, but the second story of the Jefferson Street façade was removed in 1955. Previously consisting of two storefronts, the Jefferson Street side was later combined into one, with a recessed central entrance flanked by pilasters and two large single-pane fixed windows on either side. This portion of the building is also painted white with green accents, rather than the red with unpainted stone accents of the remainder of the building, providing additional visual separation. The corner and first bay of either side are adorned with stone pilasters with capitals supporting a stone course that wraps around the building. The tower has a single one-over-one sash window on each face of the second floor, with a pair of small arched windows on the third. It is topped with a pyramidal roof and ball finial. Along Holmes Avenue, the first floor has no windows, while the second floor has a pair of one-over-one windows per bay. The building is topped with a bracketed pressed metal cornice. The roof on the end of the building on the Holmes side steps down to a separate unit, featuring a Romanesque Revival arched entryway below a bay window. The building was listed on the National Register of Historic Places in 1980.
