= Milligan Block =

- U.S. National Register of Historic Places
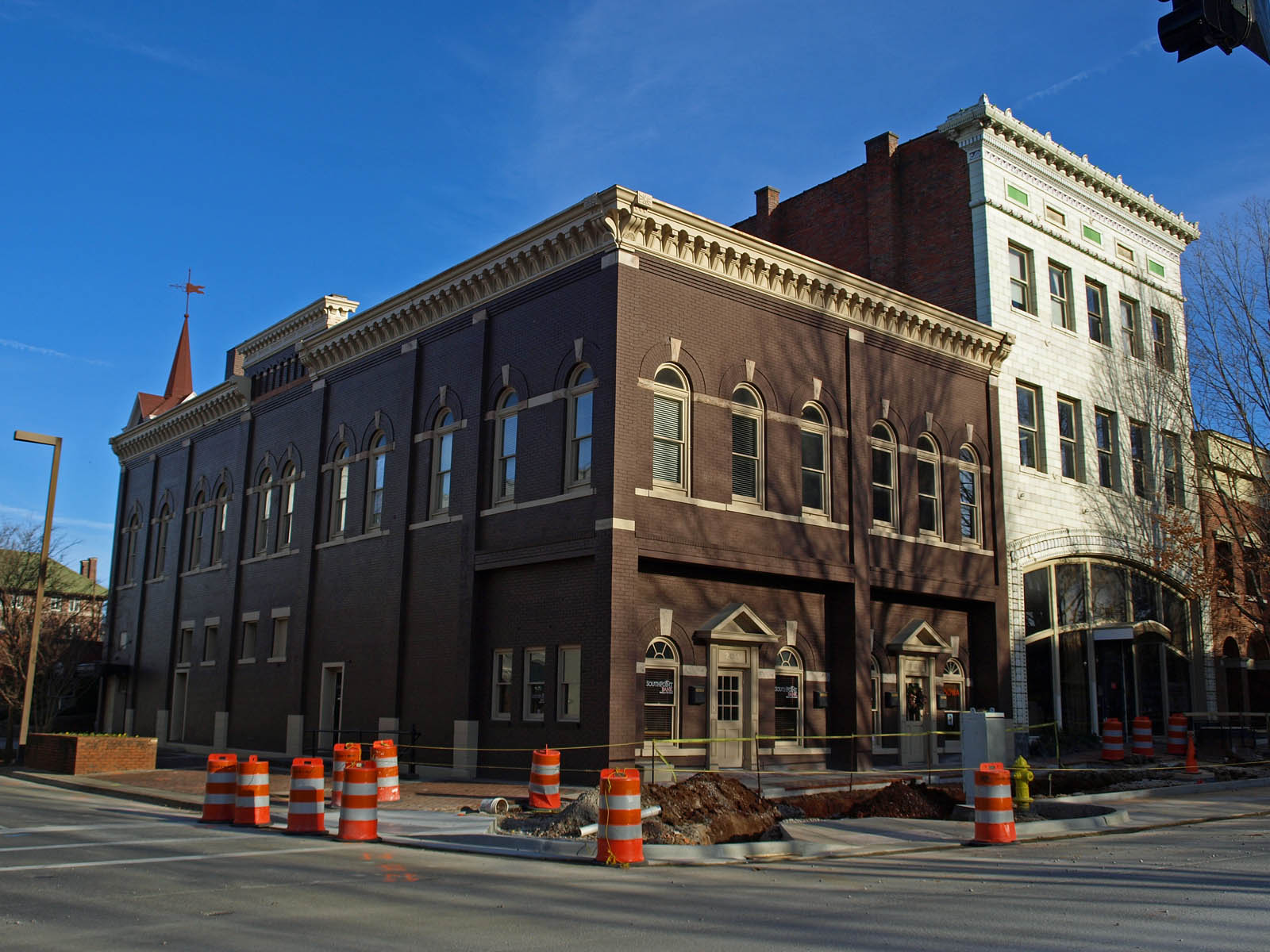
- The building in December 2009

- Location within Huntsville, Alabama Location within Alabama Location within the United States
- Location: 201-203 E. Side Sq., Huntsville, Alabama
- Coordinates: 34°43′51″N 86°35′5″W
- Area: less than one acre
- Built: 1900
- Architectural style: Commercial Style
- MPS: Downtown Huntsville MRA
- NRHP reference No.: 80000721
- Added to NRHP: September 22, 1980

The Milligan Block is a historic commercial building in Huntsville, Alabama. It was built in 1900 and represents the transition from vertically-oriented Italianate style to more restrained, horizontally-oriented commercial styles of the early 20th century. It retains Italianate details such as an applied metal cornice and arched windows, but eschews other applied decoration in favor of using structural elements to provide ornamentation.

The street-level façade is recessed and divided into two bays by a large brick pilaster. Each bay has a single door covered with a shallow pediment that is flanked by one-over-one sash windows topped with a segmented fanlight. Above each window is a decorative brick arch with an ashlar keystone. The sills are a continuous course of ashlar, broken only by the doors and central pilaster, while a similar course of quarry-faced limestone forms the base of the arches. This window treatment is repeated on the second floor façade and on the Randolph Avenue side. The side is also divided into bays by pilasters, and the cornice on the middle bay is raised.

The building is adjacent to the May and Cooney Dry Goods Company and behind it on Randolph Avenue is the Randolph Street Church of Christ. The building was listed on the National Register of Historic Places in 1980.
