= Randolph Street Church of Christ =

Historic church in Alabama, United States

- U.S. National Register of Historic Places
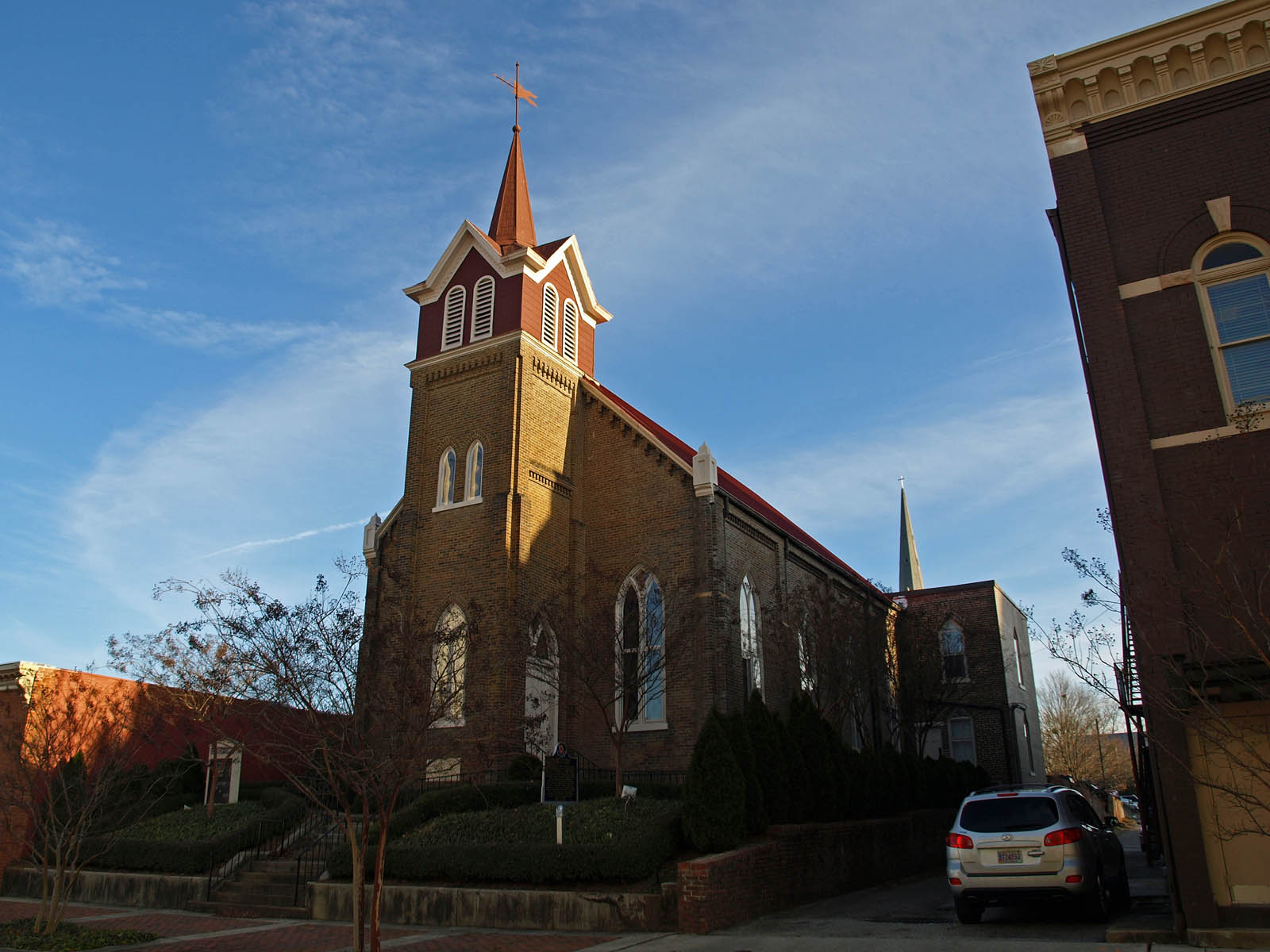
- The church in December 2009

- Location within Huntsville, Alabama Location within Alabama Location within the United States
- Location: 210 Randolph Ave., Huntsville, Alabama
- Coordinates: 34°43′52″N 86°35′3.5″W
- Area: less than one acre
- Built: 1887
- Architectural style: Gothic Revival
- MPS: Downtown Huntsville MRA
- NRHP reference No.: 80000723
- Added to NRHP: September 22, 1980

The Randolph Street Church of Christ is a historic church in Huntsville, Alabama. It was built in 1887 in a Gothic Revival style similar to rural churches, but built of brick. Rather than a central entrance, the tower contains doors under pointed toplights on the sides, and a double lancet window joined under a pointed arch. Another set of lancets flanks the tower. On the corners of the façade and along the side walls are pilasters, dividing the sides into bays with one set of lancets each. The eaves of the gable are corbelled. Above the eaves, the tower is faced with tin, and each side has a pair of arched vents below a small gable. A modern spire and weather vane top the tower. The church sits half a block from Courthouse Square, adjacent to the rear of the Milligan Block. The church was listed on the National Register of Historic Places in 1980.
