= Butlers' Store =

- U.S. National Register of Historic Places
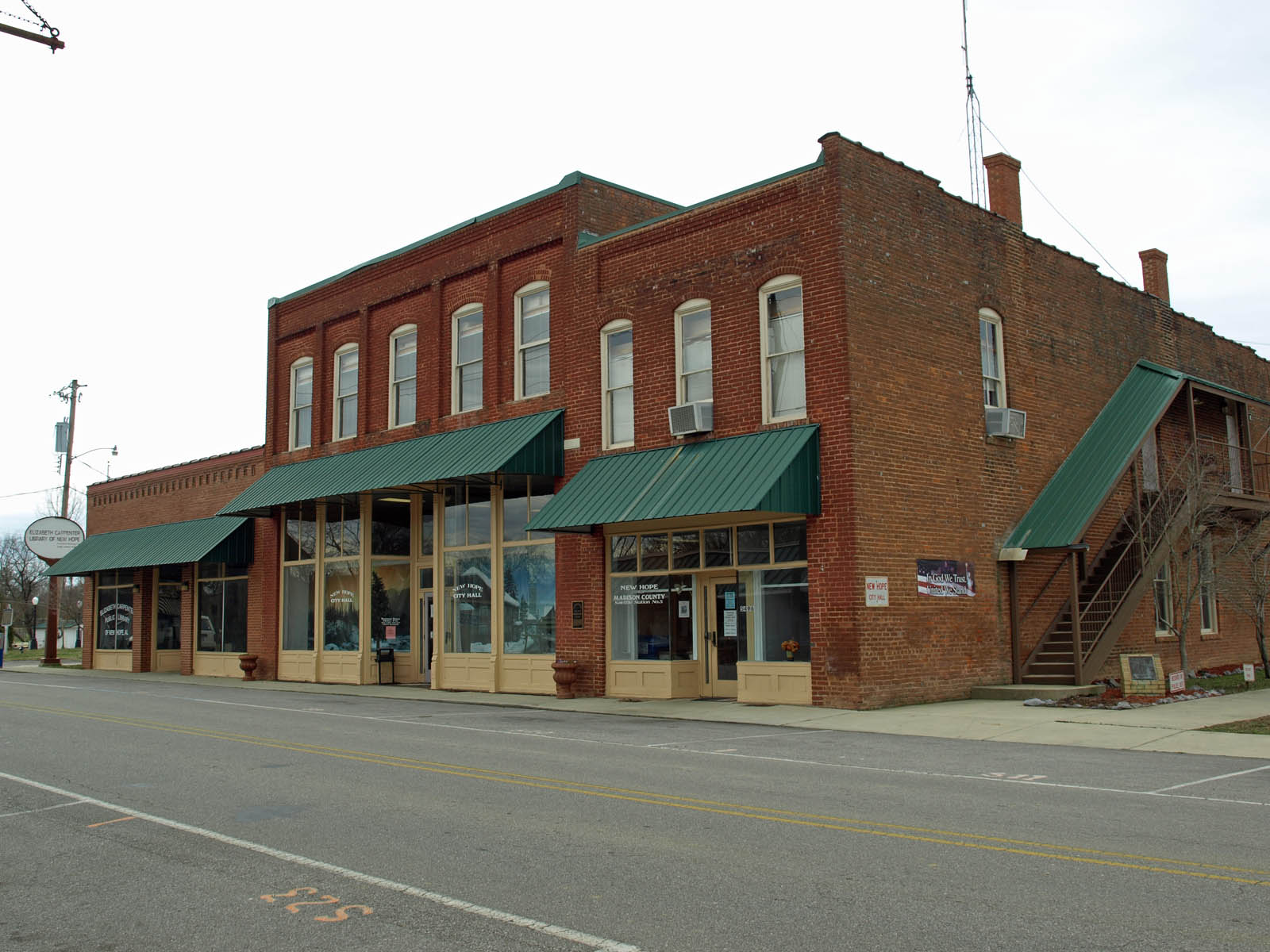
- The buildings in February 2012

- Location within Alabama Location within the United States
- Location: 5498 Main Dr., New Hope, Alabama
- Coordinates: 34°32′13″N 86°23′40″W
- Area: less than one acre
- Built: 1909, 1939
- Architectural style: Late 19th And Early 20th Century American Movements
- NRHP reference No.: 92001089
- Added to NRHP: August 31, 1992

Butlers' Store is a group of three historic commercial buildings in New Hope, Alabama. The Butler family began their dry goods and hardware business in the 1850s, and in 1909 built 2 two-story buildings on New Hope's main street. The central building was used for a general merchandise, dry goods, and hardware store and office space. It features a five-bay façade with cast iron columns separating large glass panes atop wood panel bulkheads on the storefront level. Large transom windows over the main windows cast light into the room with 18-foot (5.5-meter) ceilings and a mezzanine in the rear. The northern building was used for a bank until the Great Depression, after which it was connected to the central building and used as a grocery store. It is shorter than the central building, due to a lower ceiling on the ground floor. Both of the older buildings have brick corbelling and slightly arched second-floor windows. The one-story southern building was constructed in 1939 and housed a furniture store. Three bays in width, its ground floor appearance is similar to the northern building, but its roofline is more plain.

The business flourished from the 1930s to the 1950s, when it also sold farm equipment, fertilizers, and building materials, and bought cotton and cottonseed. Business declined as agriculture waned and commercial activity in nearby Huntsville increased, and the company closed in the mid-1970s. Today, the buildings are owned by the city of New Hope, and house a police station, city hall, and public library. They were listed on the National Register of Historic Places in 1992.
