= Ryland, Alabama =

- Unincorporated community
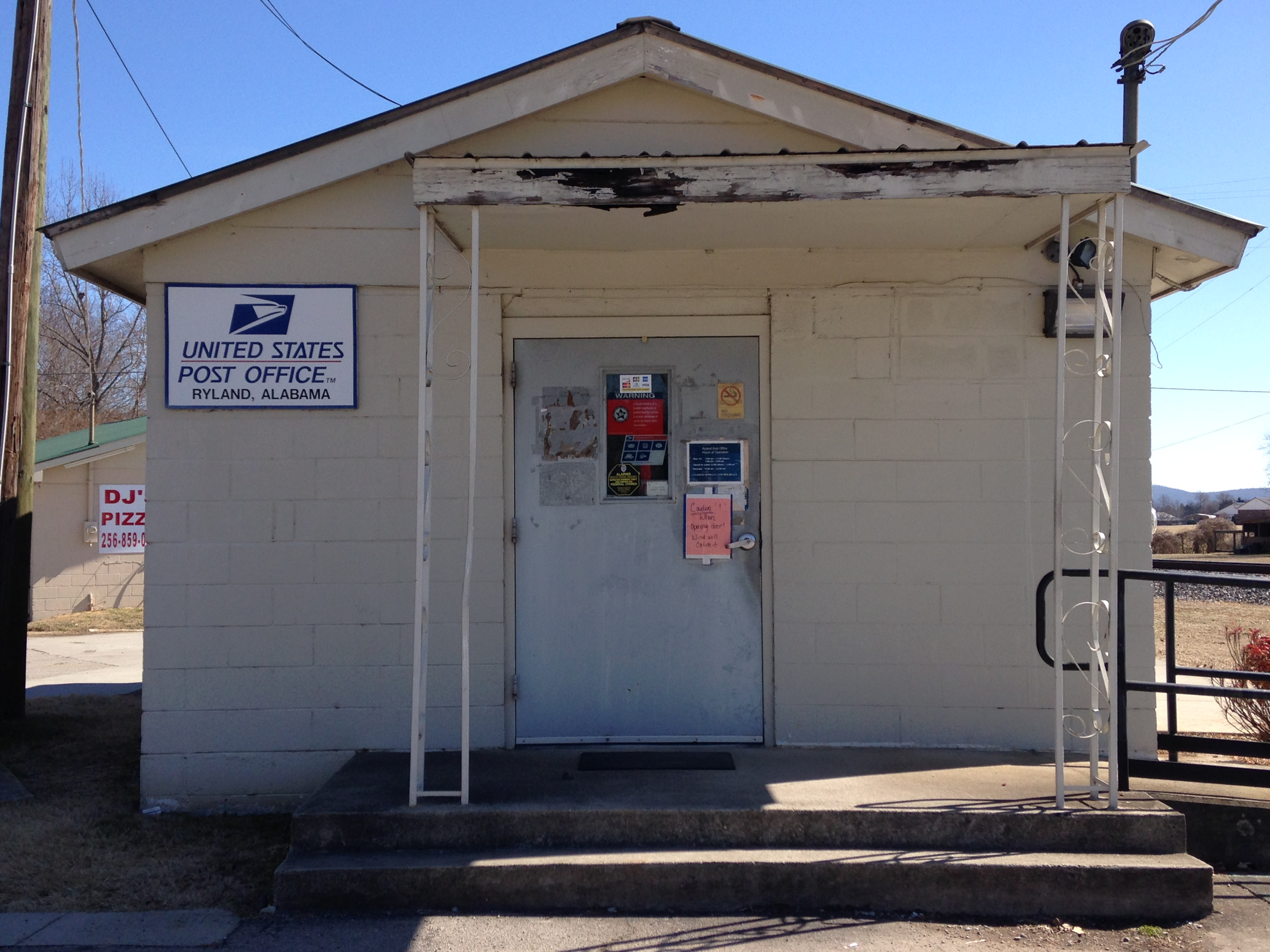
- Post office in Ryland

- Location within Alabama Location within the United States
- Coordinates: 34°46′11″N 86°28′51″W
- Country: United States
- State: Alabama
- County: Madison
- Elevation: 705 ft (215 m)
- Time zone: UTC-6 (Central (CST))
  - Summer (DST): UTC-5 (CDT)
- Area code: 256
- GNIS feature ID: 126069

Ryland is an unincorporated community in eastern Madison County, Alabama. The community borders Maysville.

== History ==
Ryland is named after the first postmaster, Virgil Homer Ryland. A post office was established under the name Ryland in 1895.
