= William Lanford House =

Historic house in Alabama, United States

- U.S. National Register of Historic Places
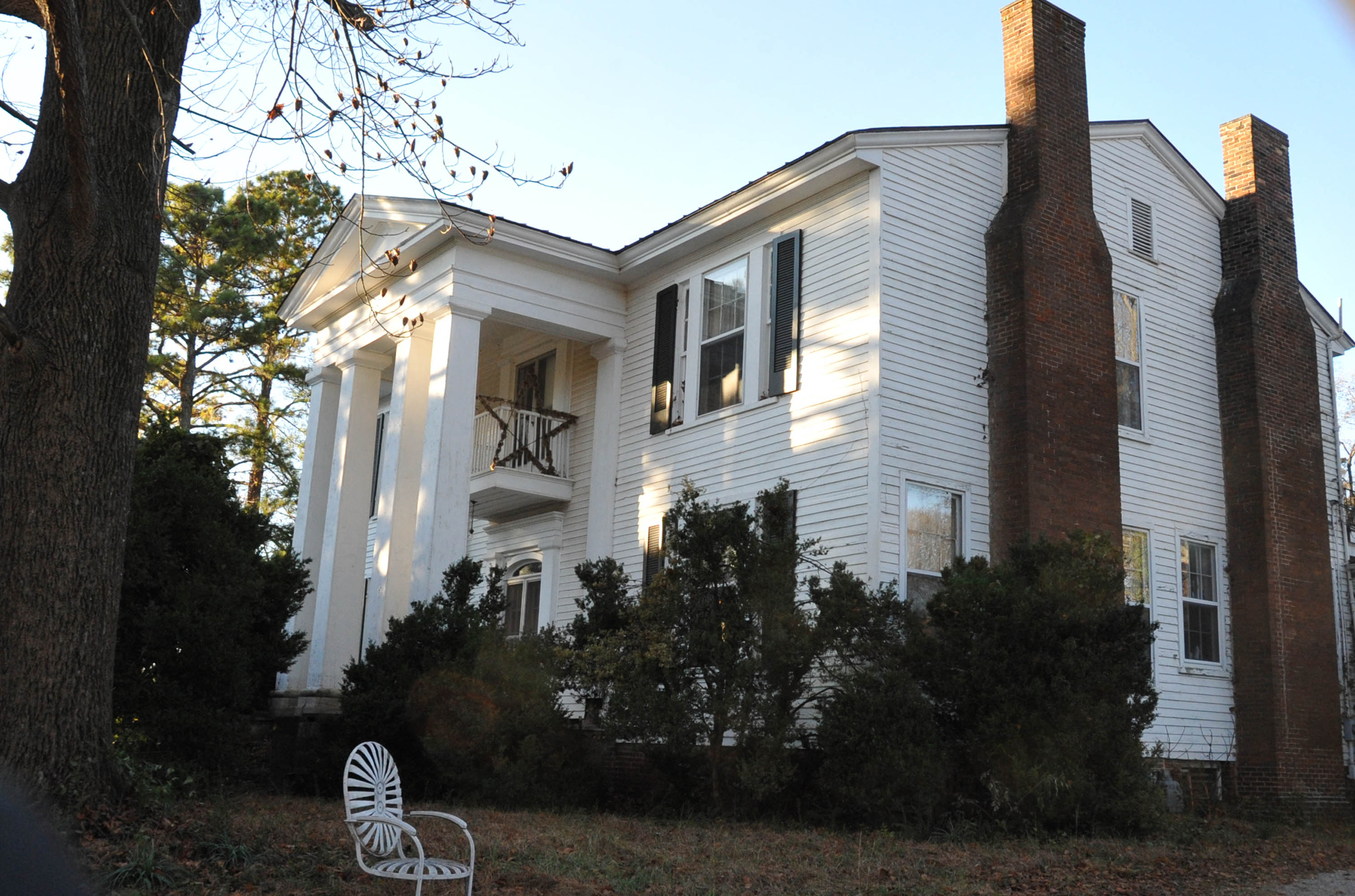
- The house in May 2008

- Location within Huntsville, Alabama Location within Alabama Location within the United States
- Location: 7400 Old Madison Pike, Huntsville, Alabama
- Coordinates: 34°42′54″N 86°41′44″W
- Area: 112 acres (45 ha)
- Built: 1850
- Architect: William C. Leadingham
- Architectural style: Federal, Greek Revival
- NRHP reference No.: 94000499
- Added to NRHP: May 20, 1994

The William Lanford House (also known as the Lanford-Slaughter-Camper House) is a historic residence in Huntsville, Alabama. The house was built by William Lanford, a native of Spotsylvania County, Virginia. Lanford's father, Robert, was an early land speculator who came to Huntsville from Nashville along with LeRoy Pope. William purchased 1,975 acres (800 ha) in 1843 and built his house in 1850. Lanford's daughter, Mary, married physician John R. Slaughter in 1853, who later moved his practice to the house in William Lanford's later life. Upon his death in 1881, the land was divided among Lanford's daughters, with Mary and Dr. Slaughter remaining in the house. After Mary's death in 1913, the house was sold to William Olin Camper in 1919. Camper and his brother Robert were merchants in Madison and Huntsville, and owned the Twickenham Hotel in Huntsville.

The house is situated on 52 acres (21 ha) between Indian Creek and Cummings Research Park, in extreme western Huntsville near the town of Madison. It exhibits well-proportioned Greek Revival form, with a double-height tetrastyle portico and gently sloped gable roof. The portico base is of brick, with four boxed, tapered columns with Doric capitals. A balcony sits above the front entrance, which is surrounded by pilasters and an entablature, and topped with a Federal-style sunburst fanlight. Windows outside of the portico are six-over-six sashes with Palladianesque narrow sidelights. The interior has a central hall flanked by two rooms on each side. The walls of the front two rooms are built of multiple panels which can be folded up to create a large space for entertaining. A two-room addition off the northwest of the house, constructed in the mid-20th century, contains a den, bedroom, and bathroom, while an enclosed veranda sits off the eastern half of the rear. On the second floor, there are four bedrooms, and a deck over the veranda.

The house was listed on the National Register of Historic Places in 1994.
