= 104–128 South Side Square =

- Buildings at 104–128 S. Side Sq.
- U.S. National Register of Historic Places
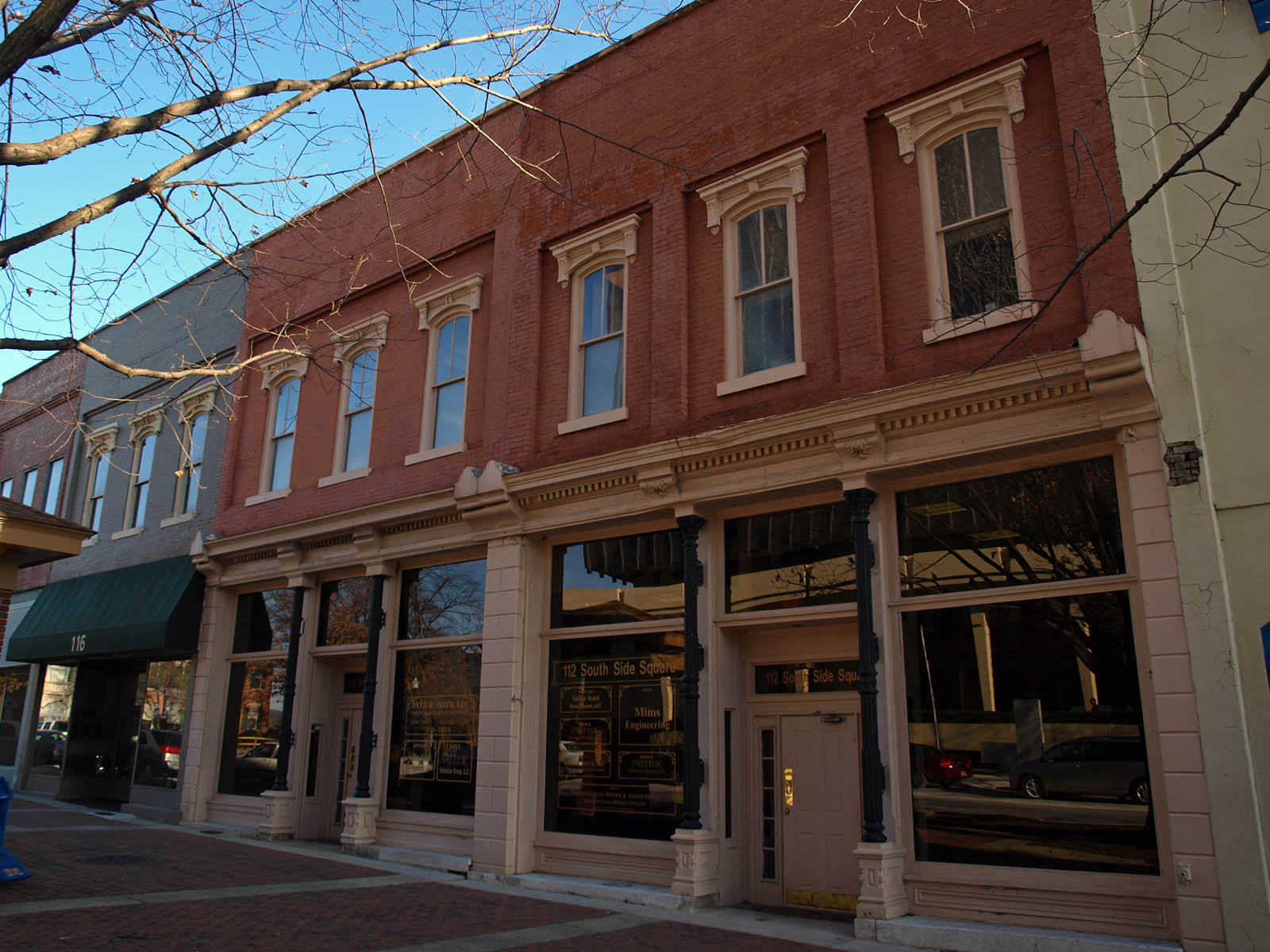
- 112–116 South Side Square

- Location within Huntsville, Alabama Location within Alabama Location within the United States
- Location: 104–128 S. Side Sq., Huntsville, Alabama
- Coordinates: 34°43′47″N 86°35′5″W
- Architectural style: Italianate, Commercial Brick
- MPS: Downtown Huntsville MRA
- NRHP reference No.: 80004472
- Added to NRHP: September 22, 1980

104–128 South Side Square is a block of historic commercial buildings in Huntsville, Alabama, United States. The block, known as "Commercial Row" in the late 1800s, consists of fifteen two- and three-story buildings constructed between 1835 and 1912. 108, built in 1835 as a store for the Bell Factory textile mill, and 110, built in 1840, are the oldest buildings on the block but both have been extensively modified. 106, 112, 114, and 116 were all built in the 1880s in Italianate style; 118 was also built at this time but damaged by fire in 1901 and rebuilt without many of its original details. 128, built in 1896, is a transitional style between Italianate and the more restrained, 20th century Commercial Brick style. 104, 120, 122, and 124–126 were all built between 1903 and 1912 in the later commercial style. 122 was extensively renovated in 1965 with a modern façade. 124 and 126 have housed the Harrison Brothers hardware store since they were built in 1902; the store opened in another building on the square in 1897, and has been operated by the Historic Huntsville Foundation since 1984. At the time of the nomination, 100 had its original Italianate features covered or removed; it has since been restored, including a balcony wrapping around the façade and halfway down the Madison Street side of the building. The buildings were listed on the National Register of Historic Places in 1980.
