= Mason Building =

- U.S. National Register of Historic Places
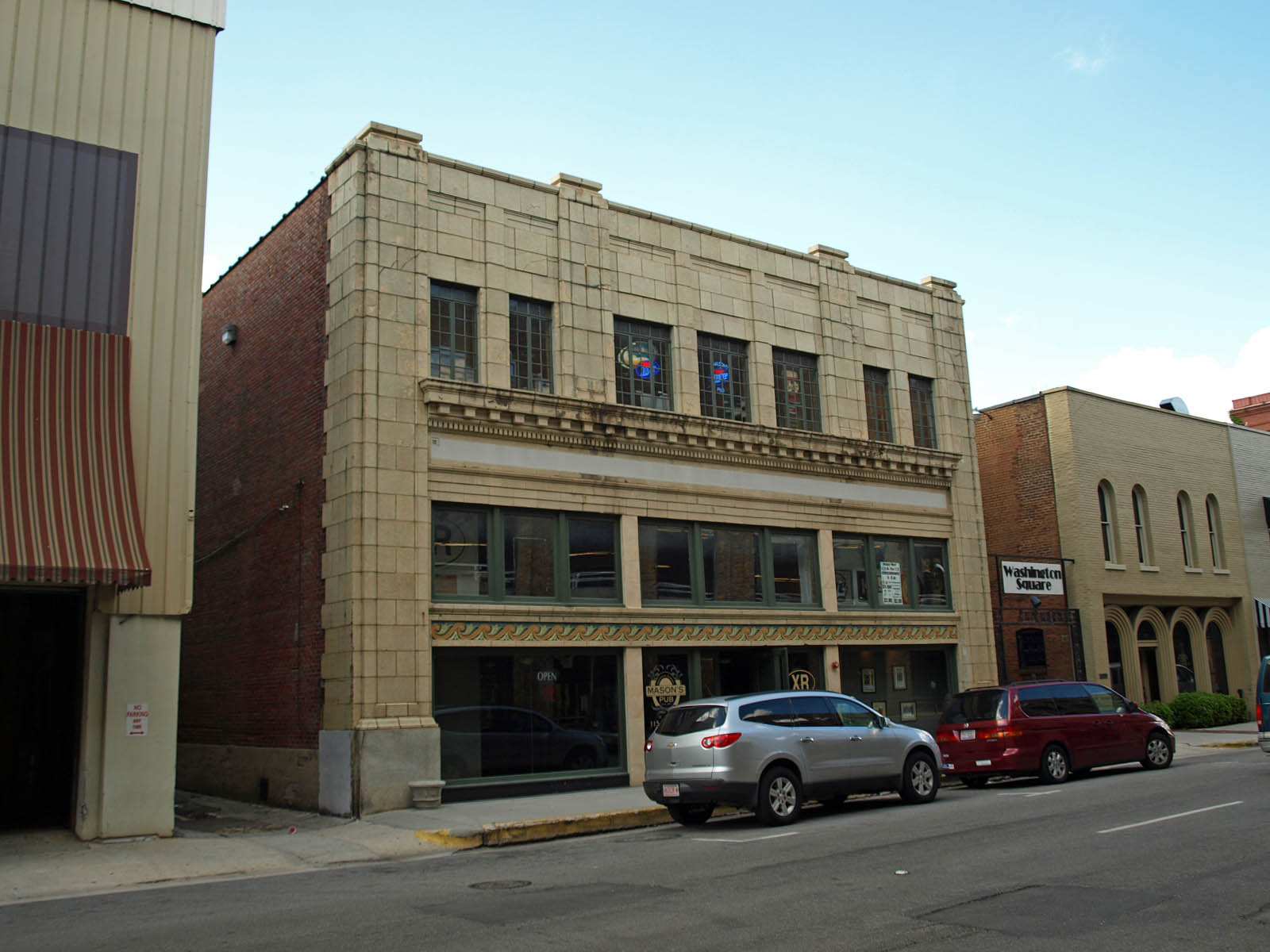
- The building in May 2011

- Location within Huntsville, Alabama Location within Alabama Location within the United States
- Location: 115 E. Clinton Ave., Huntsville, Alabama
- Coordinates: 34°43′54″N 86°35′10″W
- Area: less than one acre
- Built: 1927
- Architect: Edgar Love
- MPS: Downtown Huntsville MRA
- NRHP reference No.: 80000719
- Added to NRHP: September 22, 1980

The Mason Building is a historic commercial building at 115 East Clinton Avenue in Huntsville, Alabama, United States. It was commissioned by the Mason furniture company and built in 1927 by local architect Edgar Lee Love. The building was listed on the National Register of Historic Places in 1980.

== Architecture ==
The façade is clad in terra cotta tiles, with piers at the corners extending above the cornice. The ground floor has large glass panes and a recessed central entrance. A terra cotta band painted with a wave pattern separates the ground floor from the mezzanine-level windows, three in each bay. The mezzanine and second floor are separated by stepped rows of tiles, a wider band which originally featured a scalloped molding with a bell design, two rows of dentils (small then large), and a cornice. The second floor is divided by two wide piers, with two multi-light casement windows in the outer bays and three in the middle. The simple cornice and piers extending above it are a by-product of the intended five-story design being cut short.

== History ==
=== Mason Furniture Company ===
In 1908, when Huntsville was a milling town with a flourishing economy, business partners James "Jim" Mason (1880–1948) and J.D. Manning opened Manning & Mason, a 300 square feet furniture store at 109 E. Holmes Avenue. However, Manning died shortly after the business opened, leaving Mason as the sole proprietor. The firm expanded over the years, and by 1913 relocated to 105 W. Clinton Street. The store boasted ″one of the largest lines of furniture to be found in the Spring City.″ Mason also opened a warehouse on Jefferson Street known as Mason's No. 2. The firm eventually expanded to 42,000 square feet of floor space in 1926.

=== Planning ===
In 1927, Mason commissioned the construction of the building, which he intended to lease to other tenants, and received five bids ranging from $50,000 to $65,000. Mason entrusted the project to Edgar Lee Love, a local architect. The works were carried out by local contractor Charles E. Baxter.

=== Construction and operation ===
Though Love originally planned for five stories, the construction was interrupted after the second story by fear of altering the skyline of the town. Sears Roebuck began leasing the building in March 1929, at which time they appointed contractor G. A. Rogers to build a mezzanine and an elevator, and bring fourth interior improvements. Sears left Huntsville in 1931 in the midst of the Great Depression, and Mason's moved their store into the building. The mezzanine was then enlarged to its current size. In 1939, local architect Paul M. Speake was appointed to build a rear extension, again with the help of Charles E. Baxter. When James Mason died in 1948, the company was taken over by his brother, William Oscar Mason. The company remained in the building until it went bankrupt in 1977.

The building has since housed a number of businesses. Crossroads Music Hall, also known as Crossroads Café, opened in 2007, taking advantage of the signature wrap-around mezzanine to host touring artists and local bands. However, the establishment closed down in 2013 after their lease was canceled for failing to pay rent.

In 2016, arcade-bar Pints & Pixels opened on the second floor, providing vintage video games and pinball machines. Two years later, in August, the establishment suffered a fire in the kitchen, which resulted in the closure the UG White Mercantile branch on the first floor due to water and smoke damage. Pints & Pixels relocated to West Huntsville entertainment complex Campus No. 805 in 2020.

=== Current use ===
In 2021, Crunkleton Real Estate Group sold the vacant building for $2.95 million to cybersecurity, IT and engineering contractor MartinFederal Consulting LLC. The following year, the company relocated their headquarters to the first floor and mezzanine, a few blocks from Madison Street where they were previously settled. The project was executed by M.R. Construction and Fuqua & Partners Architects. The second floor remains vacant.
