= Terry Hutchens Building =

- U.S. National Register of Historic Places
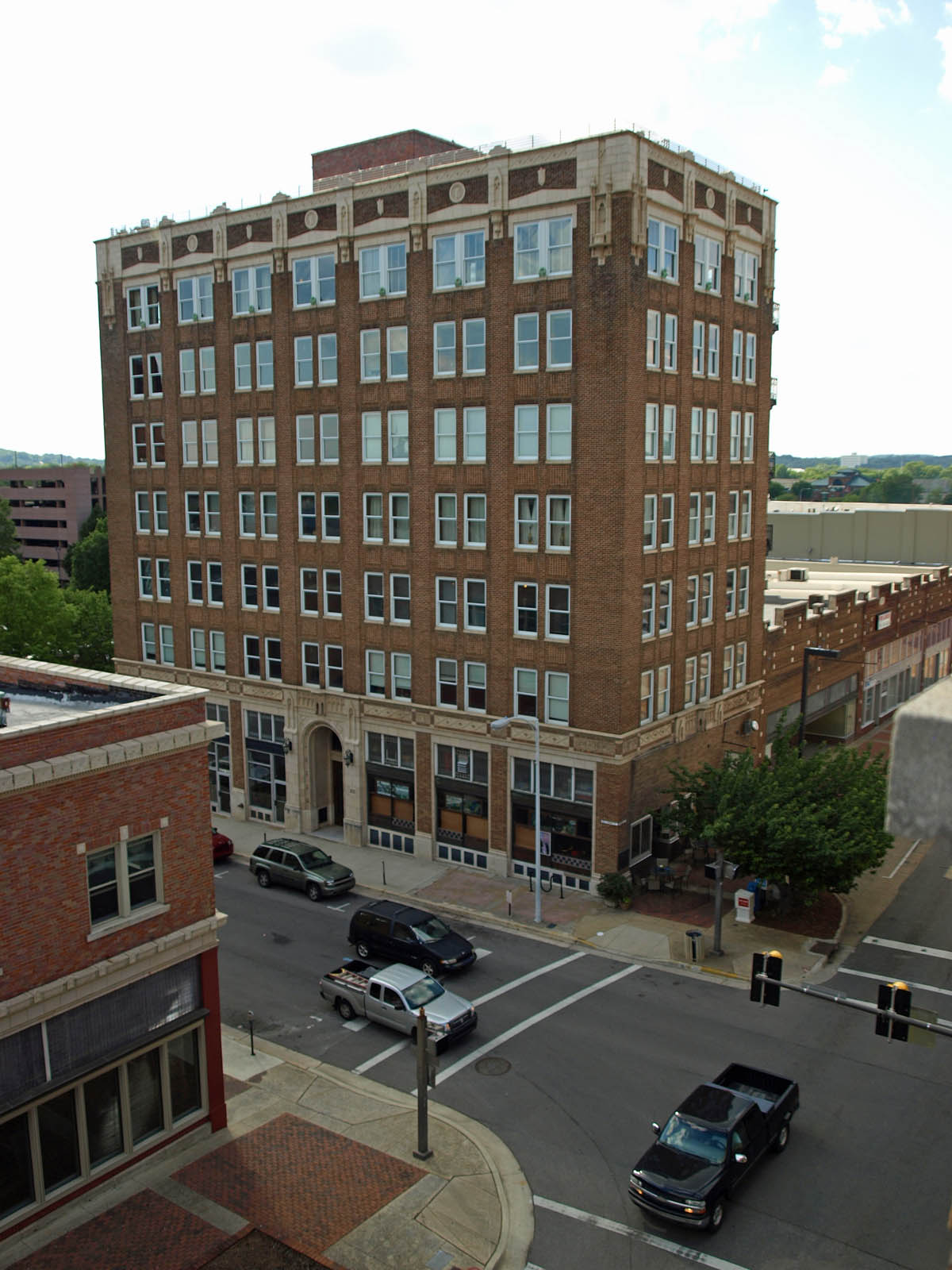
- The Terry Hutchens Building in May 2011

- Location within Huntsville, Alabama Location within Alabama Location within the United States
- Location: 102 W. Clinton Ave., Huntsville, Alabama
- Coordinates: 34°43′52″N 86°35′13″W
- Area: less than one acre
- Built: 1925
- Architect: B.F. Hunt
- Architectural style: Late Gothic Revival
- MPS: Downtown Huntsville MRA
- NRHP reference No.: 80000715
- Added to NRHP: September 22, 1980

The Terry Hutchens Building is a historic office and apartment building in Huntsville, Alabama. The seven-story structure was originally constructed in 1925 for the Tennessee Valley Bank, with office space rented to other tenants. In 2002, the upper floors were renovated into condominiums. The structure is of steel reinforced concrete faced with brick, giving a Gothic Revival appearance. The ground floor façade has large display windows separated by brick piers, and has a central, arched entry covered in masonry. The Jefferson Street façade was originally treated the same way, but was modified with a flat wall of thin brick above two storefront entrances. A decorative band with rowlock course brick and terra cotta panels separate the ground floor from the rest of the building. Above, the piers divide each bay containing a pair of one-over-one sash windows; on the seventh floor, a green terra cotta frog sits on the sill, between the windows. Each bay of the cornice is divided by terra cotta decorated with Gothic shapes and medallions on panels of brick. The building was listed on the National Register of Historic Places in 1980.
