= Russel Erskine Hotel =

- Hotel Russel Erskine
- U.S. National Register of Historic Places
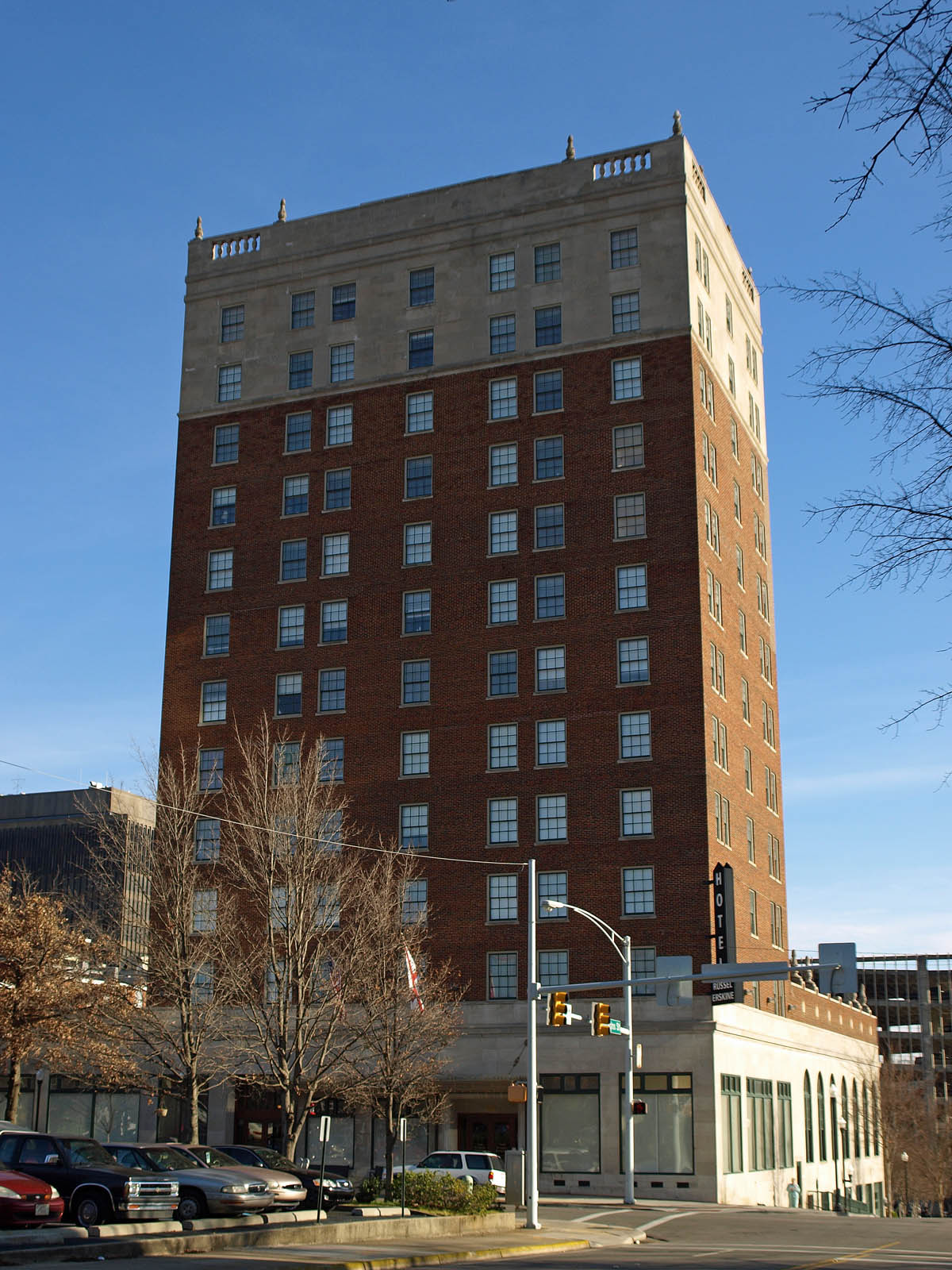

- Location within Huntsville, Alabama Location within Alabama Location within the United States
- Location: 123 W. Clinton Ave., Huntsville, Alabama
- Coordinates: 34°43′50″N 86°35′14″W
- Area: 2 acres (0.81 ha)
- Built: 1928
- Architect: Holman, Joe
- Architectural style: Classical Revival
- MPS: Downtown Huntsville MRA
- NRHP reference No.: 80000713
- Added to NRHP: September 22, 1980

The Russel Erskine Hotel is an apartment building and former hotel in Huntsville, Alabama. It was named after Albert Russel Erskine. It was added to the National Register of Historic Places in 1980. The building currently houses apartments.
