= Maysville, Alabama =

Maysville, Alabama Mayville
- Unincorporated community
- Location within Alabama Location within the United States
- Coordinates: 34°46′11″N 86°25′49″W
- Country: United States
- State: Alabama
- County: Madison
- Elevation: 692 ft (211 m)
- Time zone: UTC-6 (Central (CST))
  - Summer (DST): UTC-5 (CDT)
- Area code: 256
- GNIS feature ID: 152256

Maysville, also known as Mayville, is an unincorporated community within the city of Huntsville, AL in eastern Madison County, Alabama, United States. Maysville borders Ryland to the West, and is close to the Town of Gurley to the East

== Demographics ==
Maysville appeared on the 1890 U.S. Census with a population of 218. This was the only time it appeared on the census rolls.

Historical population
Census	Pop.	Note	%±
1890	218		—
U.S. Decennial Census

== History ==
Maysville was probably named for the May family, who were early settlers of the area. The area was once cotton and corn fields, but with the high-tech boom created by NASA Marshall Space Flight Center, and the Missile Defense Agency, the area has transformed into a grouping of subdivisions such as Cooper Estates and Maysville Estates. A post office operated under the name Maysville from 1850 to 1955.
