= Frederick Ausfeld =

American architect

- Born: 1860; Kirchen, Germany
- Died: c. 1930
- Occupation: Architect

Frederick Ausfeld (1860 – c. 1930) was a US-based, German-born architect. He designed buildings in Montgomery, Alabama, some of which are listed on the National Register of Historic Places.

== Early life ==
Frederick Ausfeld was born in 1860 in Kirchen, Germany.

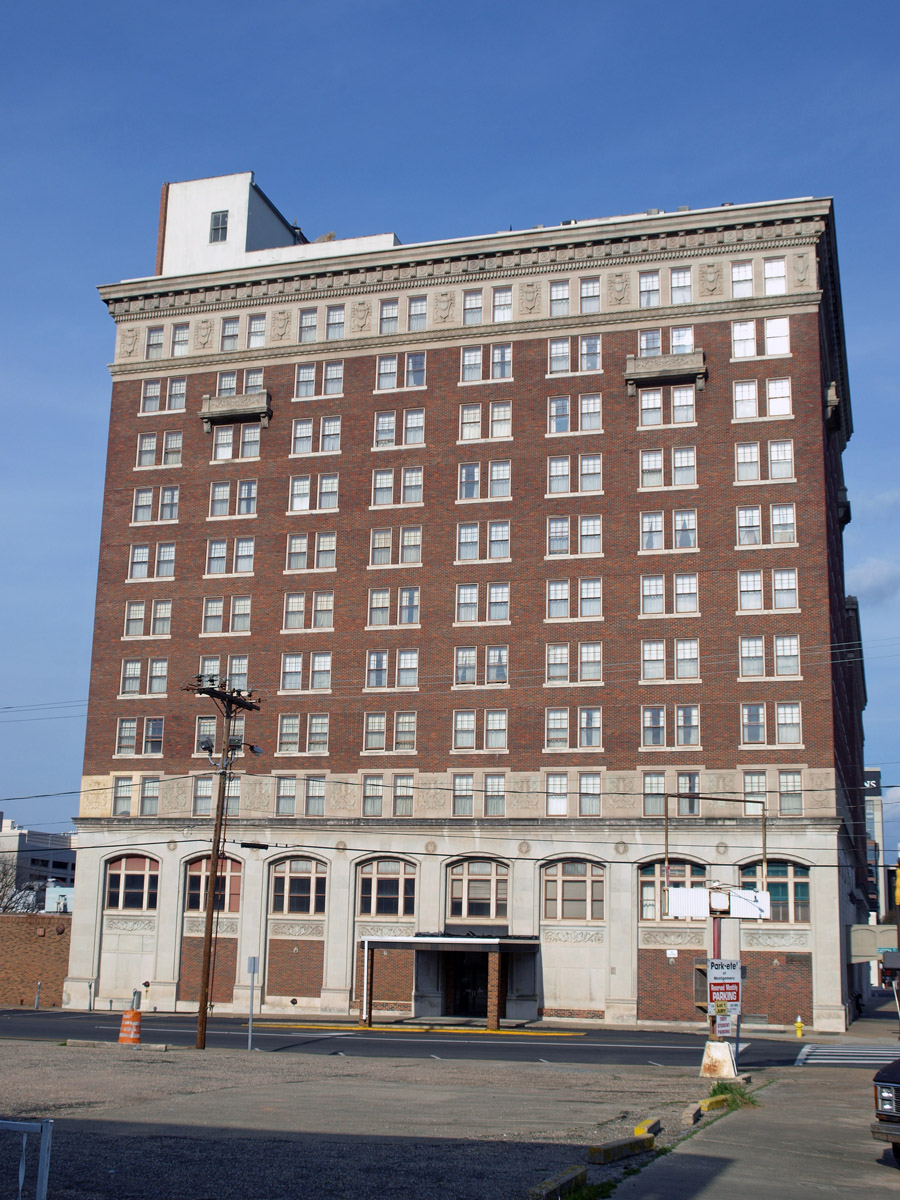
The Jefferson Davis Hotel, designed by Ausfeld.

== Career ==
Ausfeld worked as an architect in Philadelphia by 1890. He designed buildings alongside fellow architect Ausfeld moved to Alabama. With Chapman, he designed the Sumter County Courthouse in Livington in 1903. He also designed the Bell Building in Montgomery in 1907. By 1916, he designed the Covington County Courthouse in Andalusia, Alabama with Frank Lockwood. He designed the Jefferson Davis Hotel in Montgomery in 1928. He also designed the Shepherd Building in Montgomery in 1922. Additionally, he designed the Sidney Lanier High School in Montgomery. Several of his buildings are listed on the National Register of Historic Places.

Works include (with attribution):

- Bell Building, 207 Montgomery St., Montgomery, AL (Ausfeld & Blount), NRHP-listed
- Covington County Courthouse and Jail, 101 N. Court Sq., Andalusia, AL (Ausfeld, Fredrick), NRHP-listed
- Jefferson Davis Hotel, Catoma and Montgomery Sts., Montgomery, AL (Ausfeld, Frederick), NRHP-listed
- Shepherd Building (1922), 312 Montgomery St., Montgomery, AL (Ausfeld, Frederick), NRHP-listed
- Sumter County Courthouse, US 11, Livingston, AL (Ausfeld & Chapman), NRHP-listed
- Sidney Lanier High School, Montgomery, Alabama

== Death ==
Ausfeld died circa 1930.
