= First National Bank Building (Andalusia, Alabama) =

- U.S. National Register of Historic Places

- Location within Alabama Location within the United States
- Location: 101 S. Cotton St., Andalusia, Alabama
- Coordinates: 31°18′27″N 86°28′55″W
- Area: less than one acre
- Built: 1920
- Built by: Little, Cleckler & Co.
- Architect: Frank Lockwood
- NRHP reference No.: 82002006
- Added to NRHP: August 26, 1982

The First National Bank Building (also known as the Timmerman Building) is a historic high-rise in Andalusia, Alabama, United States. The tallest building in Andalusia, the six-story building was designed by Montgomery architect Frank Lockwood, who also designed the Covington County Courthouse which sits across the square. The building was listed on the National Register of Historic Places in 1982.

== History ==
The First National Bank of Andalusia was established in 1901 to facilitate business in the growing town. By the late 1910s, the bank had grown immensely, and commissioned the six-story Beaux-Arts building, designed by Montgomery architect Frank Lockwood. In 1928, the bank merged with the Andalusia National Bank and took on the name of the latter. It was forced to close after a run in October 1932, during the Great Depression. The Commercial Bank was founded to replace it a few months later; they purchased the National Bank building in 1937. At that time, the lobby and offices were refurbished, and the sixth floor converted from its use as a civic meeting place to more offices.

The Commercial Bank outgrew the building, moving to a new location in 1958. It was purchased by an insurance agency, who rented space to several other businesses. The building fell abandoned by 1972, until it was purchased and the ground floor renovated into a restaurant in 1981.

== Architecture ==
The building is a six-story structure two bays wide on the front and nine bays long. The building is constructed of reinforced concrete. The west and north sides (the sides facing Courthouse Square) are veneered with smoothed concrete block on the first story, and tan brick on the upper floors, while the east and south faces are of red brick throughout.

Windows on the finished sides are single-pane wooden sashes, with arched windows over each on the first story. The upper stories feature pairs of double hung one-over-one windows. The unfinished sides have metal frame, two-over-two windows. Rosettes separate each arched window on the first floor, and a large clock, added in 1939, hangs from the corner of the building. Decorative moldings sit at the roofline and between the fifth and sixth floors.

The main floor area originally had a tiled floor, marble wainscoting, and a marble teller's counter. In the 1960s, the counter was removed, the wainscoting covered with wood paneling, and a drop ceiling installed. The paneling and ceiling was removed during renovations in 1981.
