= Garden District (Montgomery, Alabama) =

Historic district in Alabama, United States

- U.S. National Register of Historic Places
- U.S. Historic district
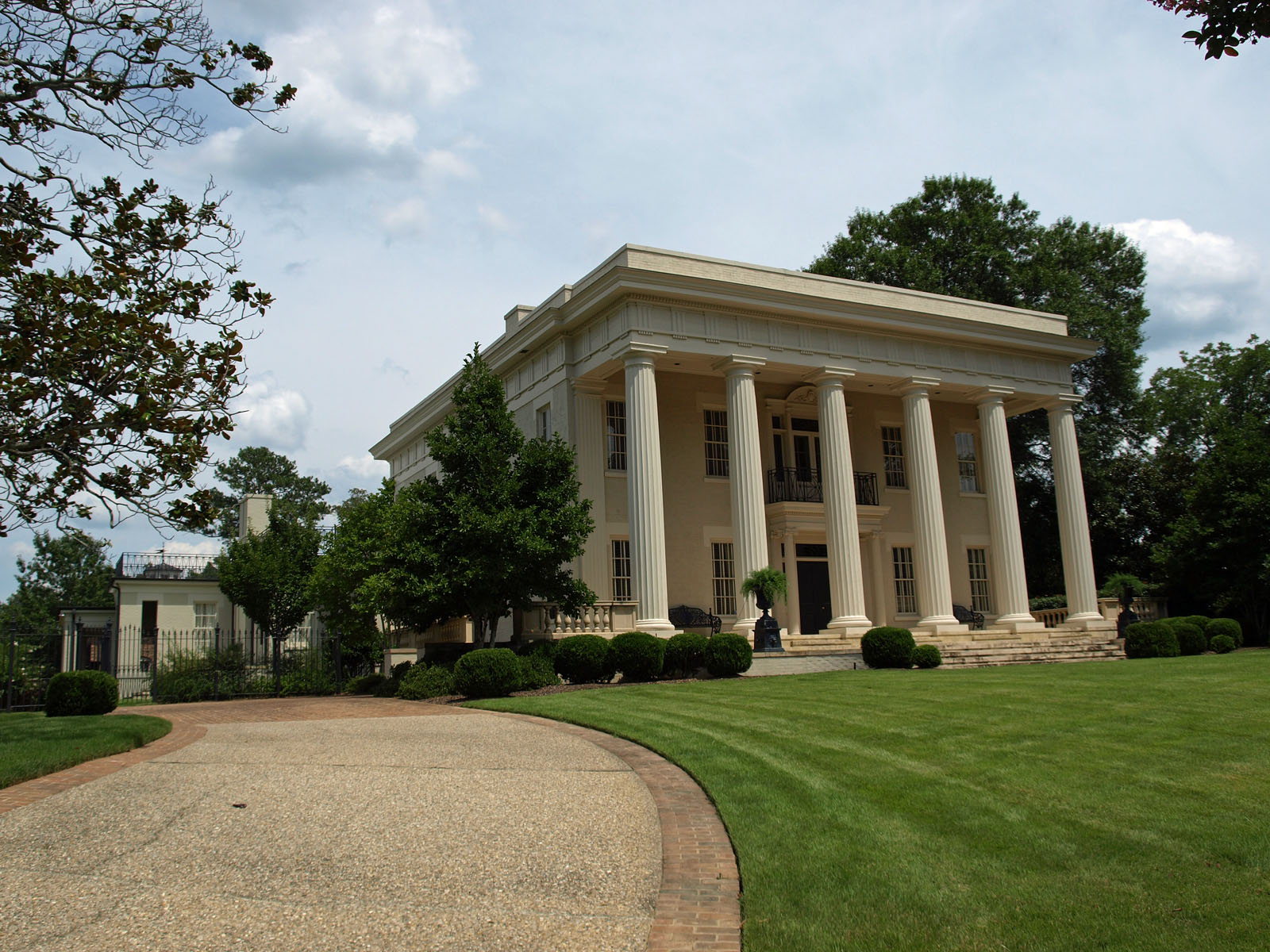
- 1919 South Hull Street in the Garden District

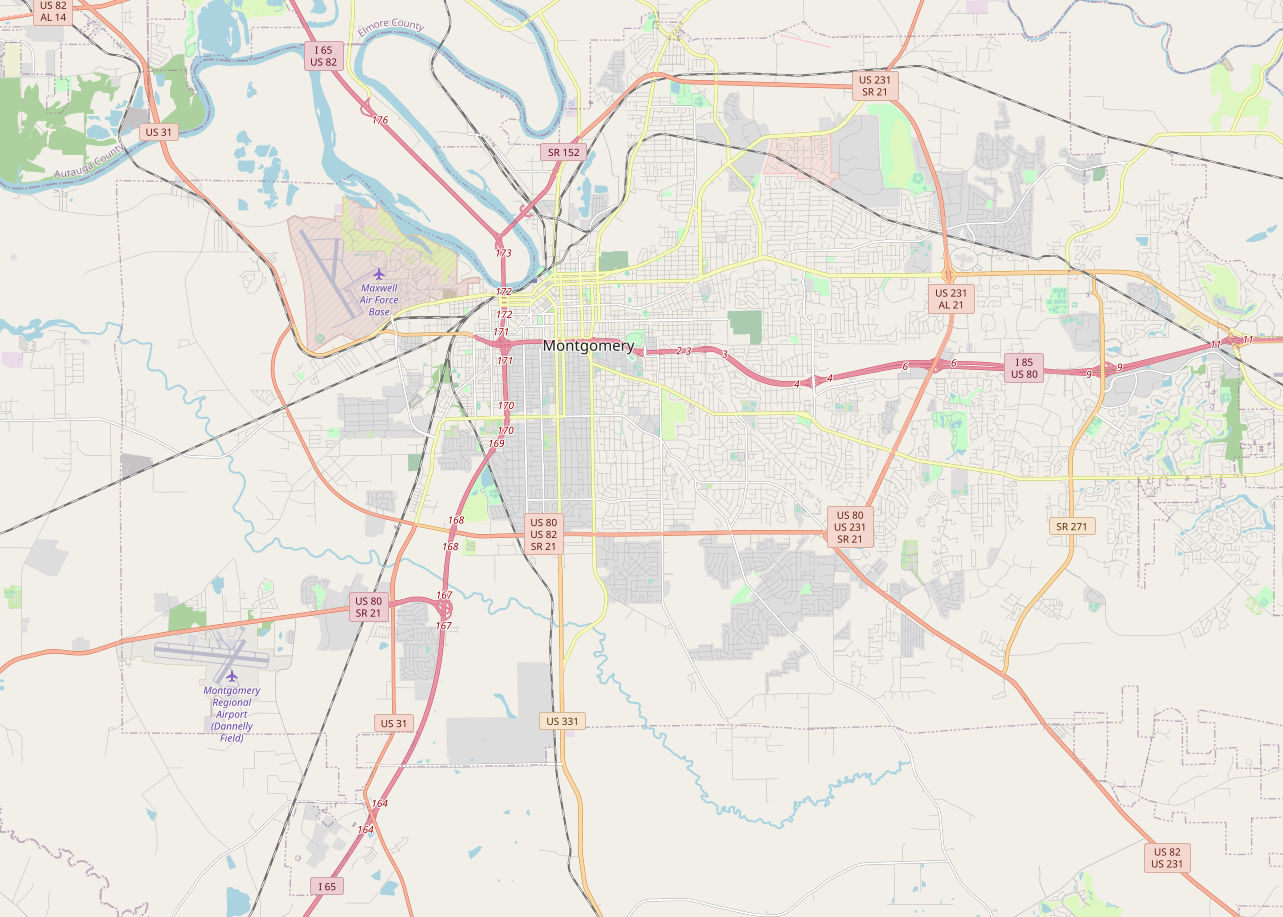
- Location within Montgomery, Alabama Location within Alabama Location within the United States
- Location: Roughly bounded by Norman Bridge Rd., Court St., Jeff Davis, and Fairview Aves., Montgomery, Alabama
- Coordinates: 32°21′29″N 86°18′19″W
- Area: 315 acres (127 ha)
- Architect: Multiple, including Ralph Adams Cram
- Architectural style: Late 19th and 20th Century Revivals, Late Victorian, and Bungalow
- NRHP reference No.: 84000698
- Added to NRHP: September 13, 1984

The Garden District is a 315-acre (127 ha) historic district in Montgomery, Alabama.

Garden District is roughly bounded by Norman Bridge Road, Court Street, Jeff Davis Avenue, and Fairview Avenue. It contains 678 contributing buildings with architecture including the Queen Anne, Classical Revival and American Craftsman styles. When listed, the district included 678 contributing buildings and 81 non-contributing buildings. The district was placed on the National Register of Historic Places on September 13, 1984.

== Architecture ==
It includes work designed by multiple architects, including one or more works by Ralph Adams Cram. It includes Late 19th and 20th Century Revivals, Late Victorian, and Bungalow, and other architecture.

Examples of architecture within the Garden District:

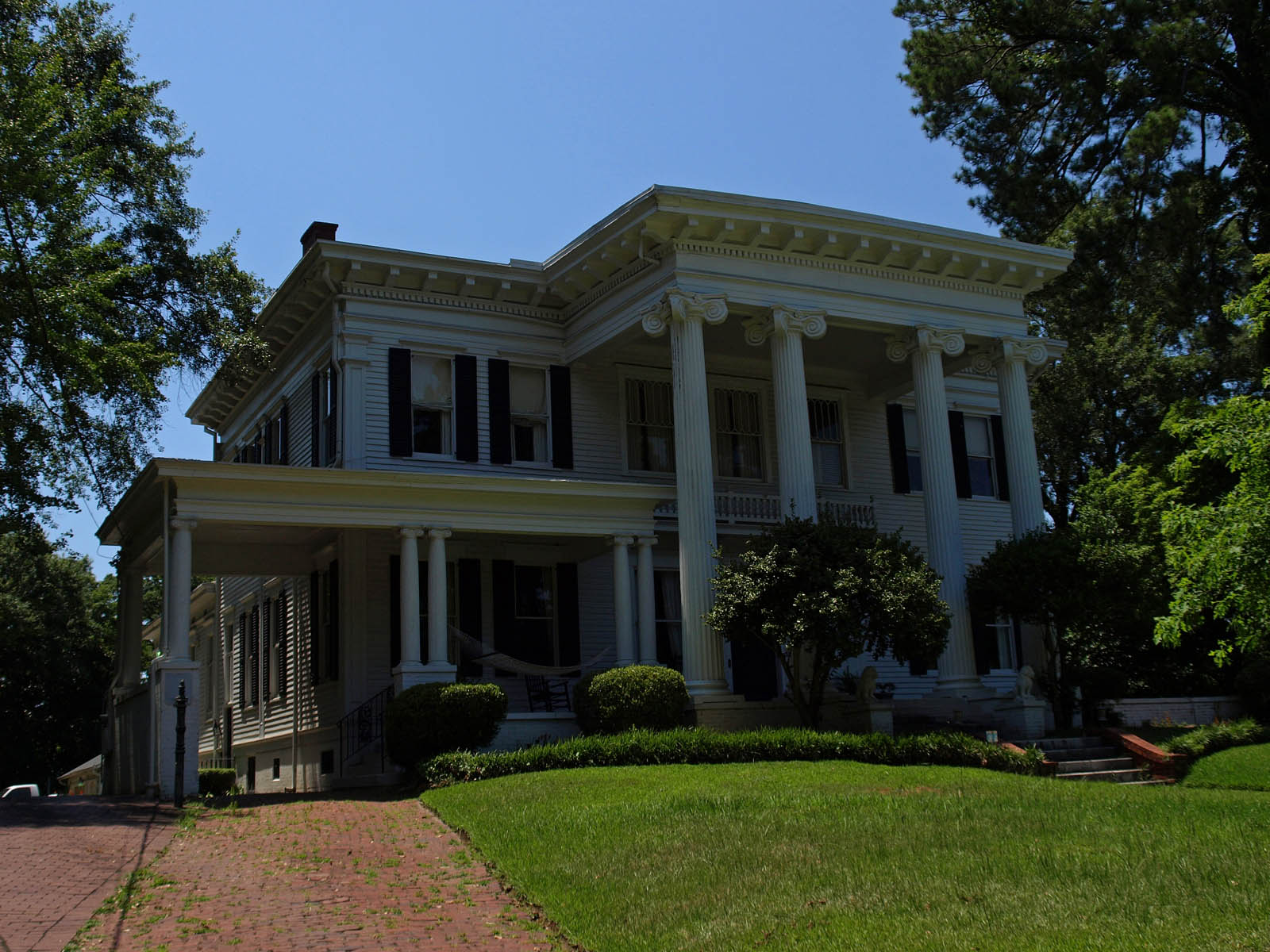
The Dr. C.A. Thigpen House, built 1898

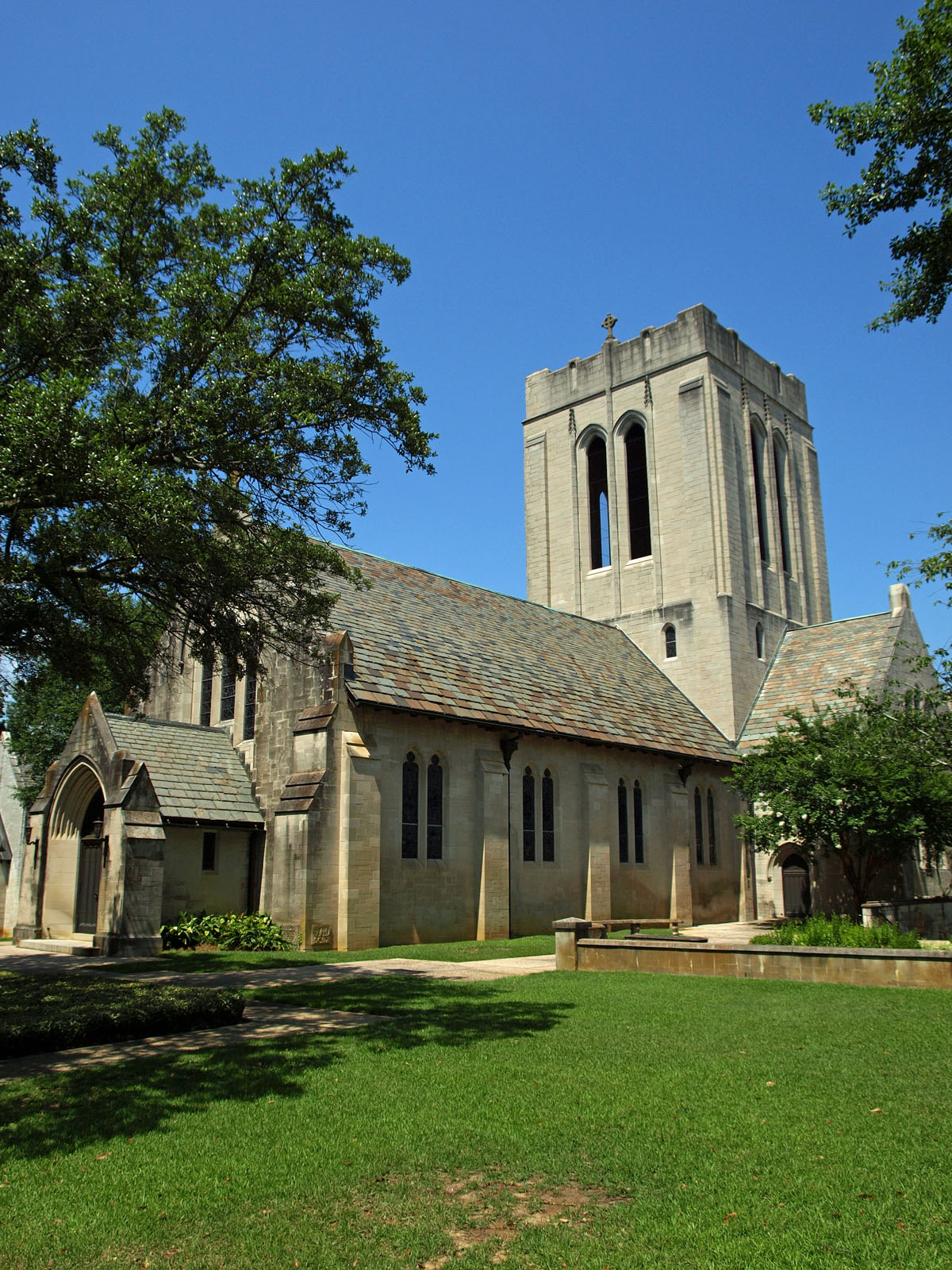
The Church of the Ascension, built 1910

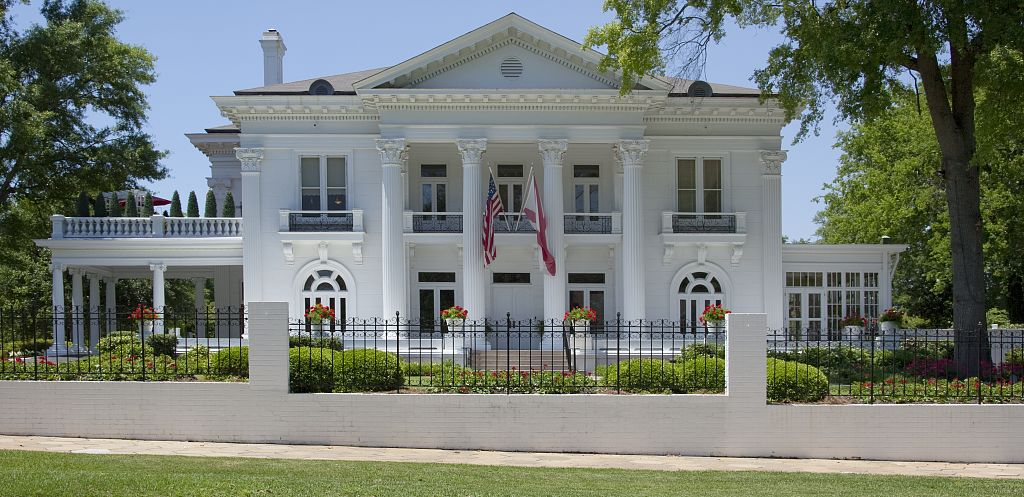
The Alabama Governor's Mansion, built 1907

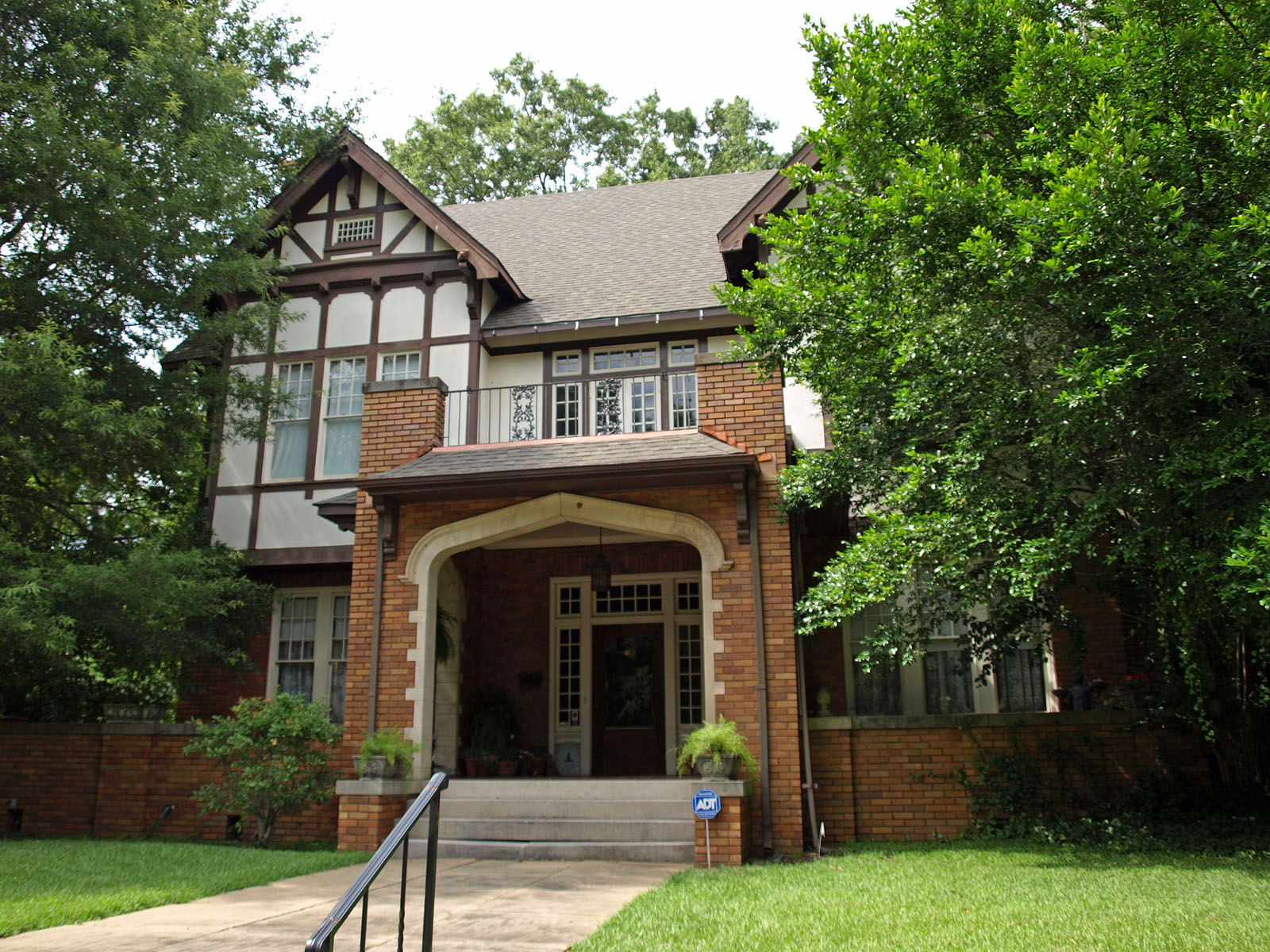
1 Felder Avenue, built 1906
