= Old Calhoun County Courthouse =

- U.S. National Register of Historic Places
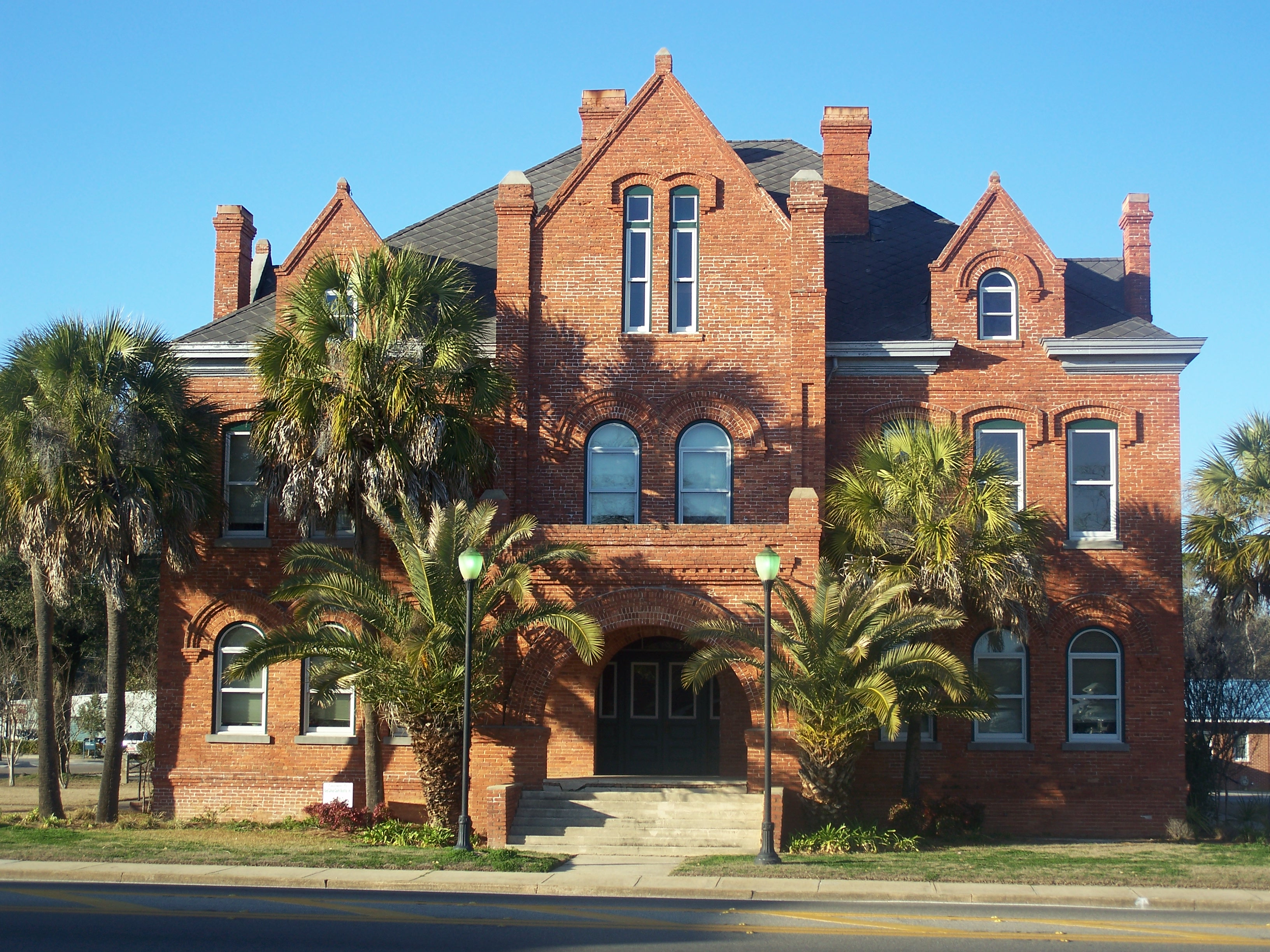

- Location within Florida Location within the United States
- Interactive map showing the location of Old Calhoun County Courthouse
- Location: Blountstown, Florida, US
- Coordinates: 30°26′35.65″N 85°2′35.39″W
- Built: 1904
- Architect: Benjamin Bosworth Smith and Frank Lockwood, both from Montgomery, Alabama
- Architectural style: Romanesque Revival
- NRHP reference No.: 80000943
- Added to NRHP: October 16, 1980

The Old Calhoun County Courthouse built in 1904 is an historic building located at 314 East Central Avenue in Blountstown, Florida. On October 16, 1980, it was added to the U.S. National Register of Historic Places.

In 1989, the Old Calhoun County Courthouse was listed in A Guide to Florida's Historic Architecture, published by the University of Florida Press. The listing calls it: "one of two Romanesque Revival courthouses extant in Florida."
