= Jefferson Davis Hotel =

- U.S. National Register of Historic Places
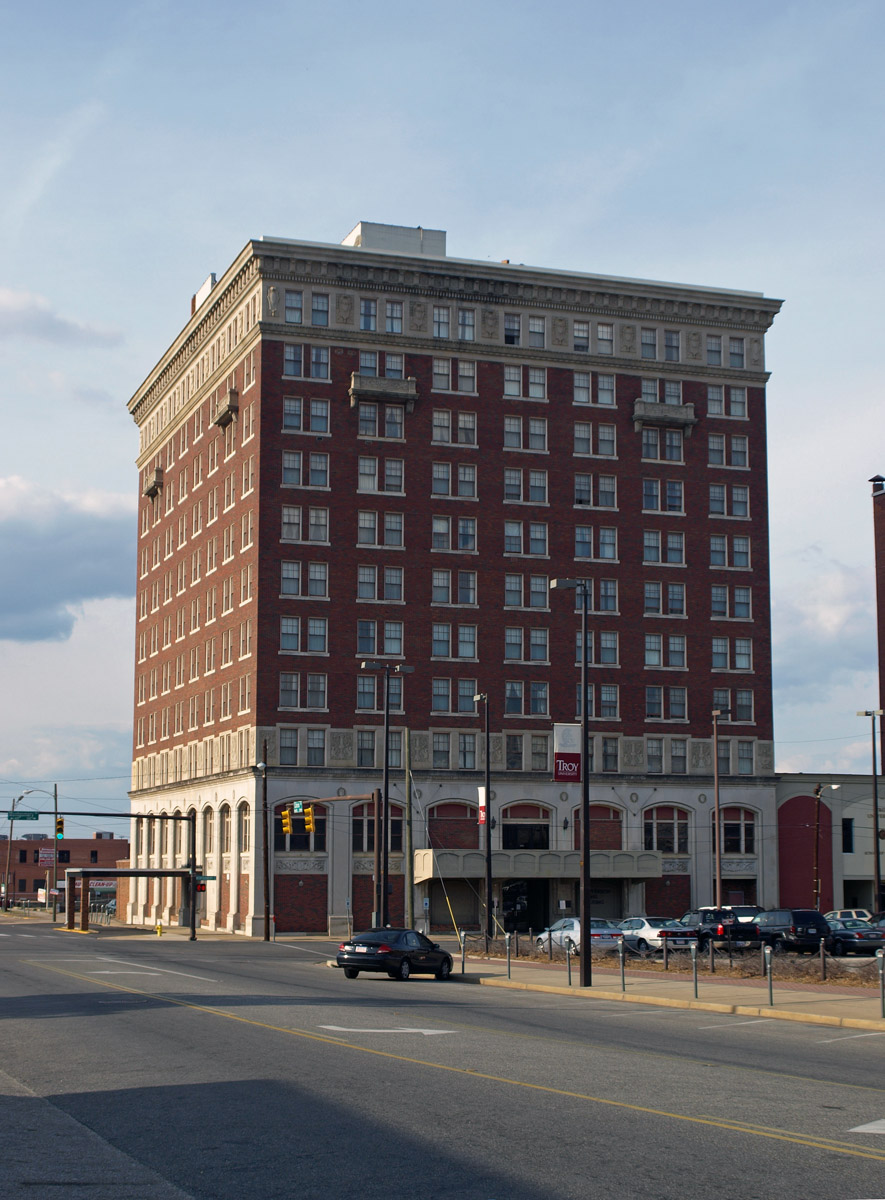

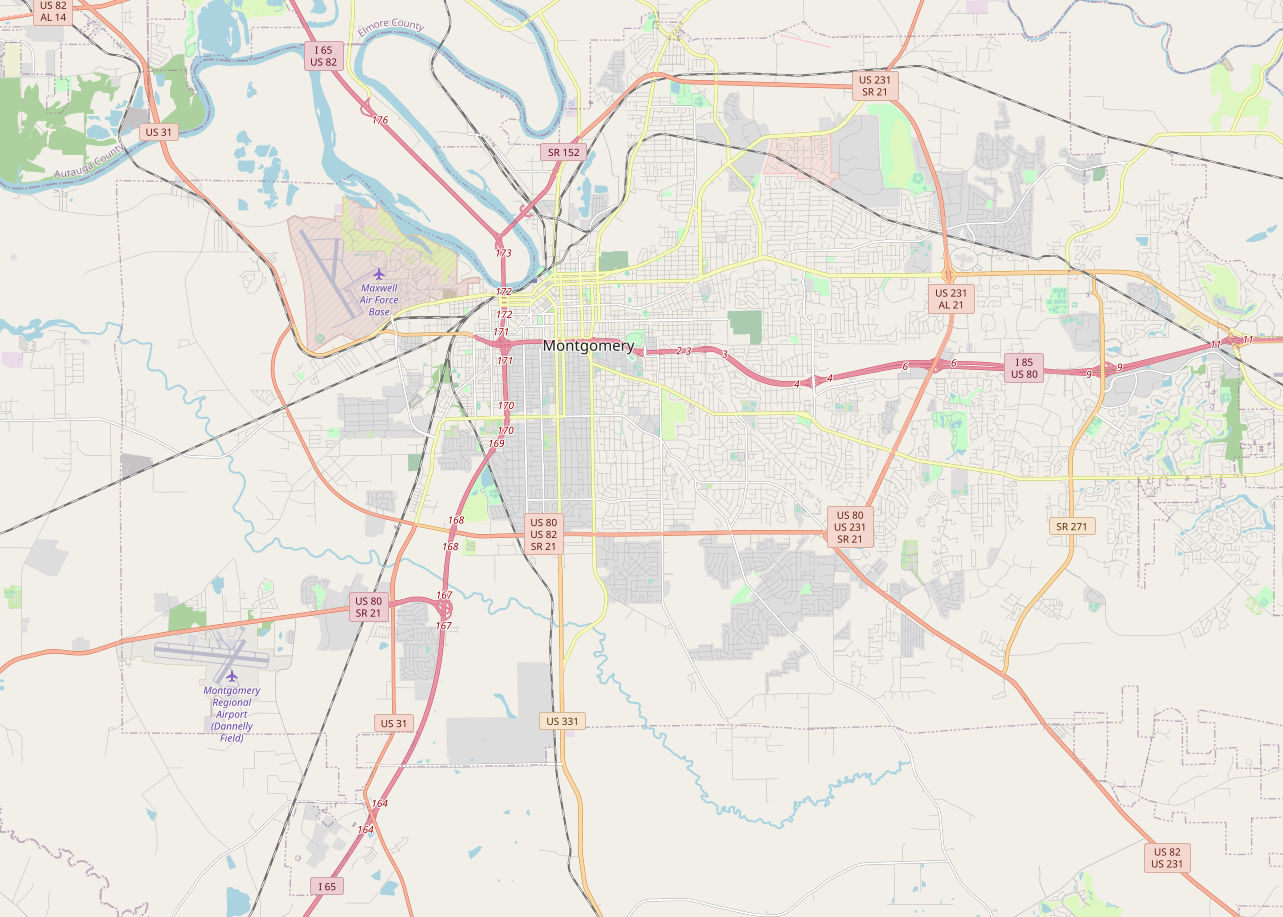
- Location within Montgomery, Alabama Location within Alabama Location within the United States
- Location: Catoma and Montgomery Sts., Montgomery, Alabama
- Coordinates: 32°22′33″N 86°18′45″W
- Built: 1927
- Architect: Frederick Ausfeld; Hugger Bros. Construction Co.
- Architectural style: Chicago, Commercial Style
- NRHP reference No.: 75000324
- Added to NRHP: March 13, 1979

The Jefferson Davis Hotel is a former hotel located in Montgomery, Alabama. It was named for Jefferson Davis, the president of the Confederate States of America. Built in 1927, it was added to the National Register of Historic Places on March 13, 1979. The buildings used to feature the WSFA radio studio, where Hank Williams performed in the late 1930s. The hotel remained segregated into the 1960s. African-American preachers, among them Ralph Abernathy and Martin Luther King Jr., were allowed into WSFA's studio to broadcast a sermon on Sunday mornings. It is currently used as apartments for the elderly.
