= Troy High School (Alabama) =

Location
- 436 Elm Street; Troy, Alabama; United States; 31°48′30″N 85°57′56″W

Information
- Type: Public high school
- Grades: 9–12
- Troy High School
- U.S. National Register of Historic Places
- Alabama Register of Landmarks and Heritage
- Area: 2.7 acres (1.1 ha)
- Built: 1917
- Built by: Thomas Purvis
- Architect: Frank Lockwood
- Demolished: 2010
- NRHP reference No.: 84000721

Significant dates
- Added to NRHP: August 30, 1984
- Designated ARLH: November 30, 1977

Troy High School, also known as Troy Community Complex, was a public high school in Troy, Alabama. It was built in 1917. It was designed by architect Frank Lockwood. The school was replaced by Charles Henderson High School. The building was demolished in 2010. A public library has been built on the site. It was listed on the U.S. National Register of Historic Places in 1984.
