= Demopolis Public School =

- U.S. National Register of Historic Places
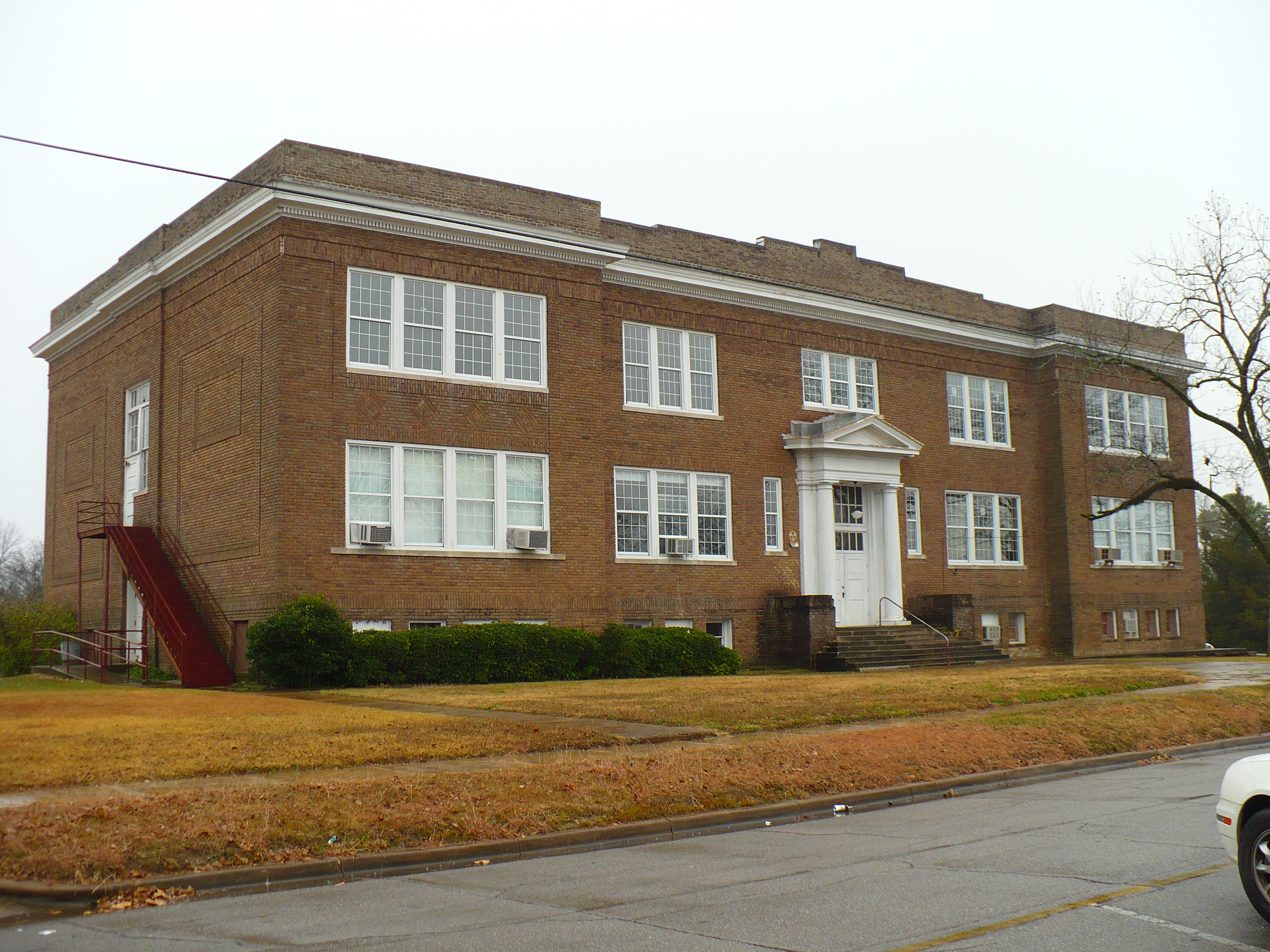
- The former Demopolis Public School in 2008

- Location within Alabama Location within the United States
- Location: Demopolis, Alabama
- Coordinates: 32°30′39″N 87°50′18″W
- Built: 1914
- Built by: Clancy & Neely
- Architect: Lockwood, Frank
- Architectural style: Beaux Arts
- NRHP reference No.: 83003453
- Added to NRHP: October 28, 1983

The Demopolis Public School also known as Demopolis Junior High School is a historic public school building in the city of Demopolis, Alabama. It was designed by architect Frank Lockwood in the Beaux-Arts style and was completed in 1914. The new two-story brick building replaced an earlier two-story Queen Anne style wood-frame structure that was built in 1889 and burned in 1913. The contractors for the new building were J.T. Clancy and W.M. Neely. The building continued as a part of the Demopolis City School System until it closed its doors in June 1981. The school was added to the National Register of Historic Places on October 28, 1983. The building now houses a theater group, the Canebrake Players.

The site was previously occupied by Marengo Military Academy building, which was destroyed by fire in 1913.
