= Marcus Meyer Skinner House =

Historic house in Alabama, United States

- U.S. National Register of Historic Places
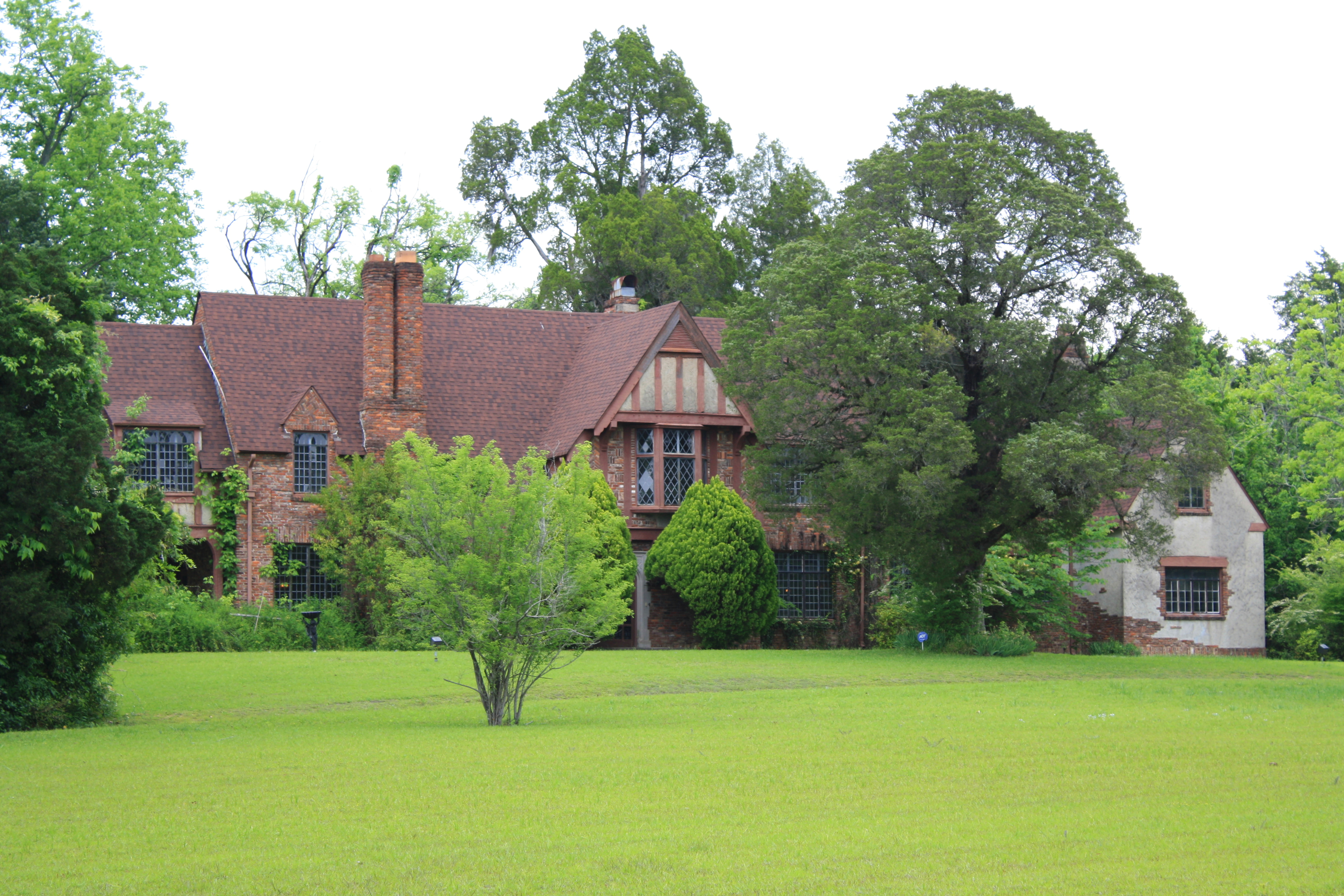

- Location within Alabama Location within the United States
- Location: 2612 Summerfield Rd., Selma, Alabama
- Coordinates: 32°26′17″N 87°1′57″W
- Area: 10.6 acres (4.3 ha)
- Built: 1928
- Architect: Frank Lockwood
- Architectural style: Tudor Revival
- NRHP reference No.: 87001418
- Added to NRHP: August 27, 1987

The Marcus Meyer Skinner House, also known as the Howorth House, is a historic house in Selma, Alabama, United States. The large two-story Tudor Revival-style house was built in 1928 for Marcus Meyer Skinner, a renowned surgeon and native of nearby Furman. It was designed by one of Alabama's leading architects of the day, Frank Lockwood.

Architectural historians consider the house to be an excellent example of early 20th-century domestic Tudor Revival architecture and among the best examples of the style in the Black Belt region of Alabama. It was added to National Register of Historic Places on August 27, 1987.
