= Lawton Campbell =

American dramatist

- Born: Charles Lawton Campbell; April 17, 1896
- Died: 1980 (aged 83–84)
- Education: Princeton University
- Occupation: Business executive

Charles Lawton Campbell (April 17, 1896 – 1980) was a business executive in the advertising field, a reporter, and playwright from Montgomery, Alabama.

== Education and career ==
Campbell went to Princeton University (class of 1916). He served with American Expeditionary Forces in Europe during World War I and also served during World War II. One of the companies he worked for was General Foods. He wrote Immoral Isabella (1927) and Solid South (1930). Files on Campbell are held at the Birmingham Public Library and some of his papers at Princeton University's rare book collection.

His parents were Charles L. and Myrtle (Booth) Campbell and he grew up on Sayre Street in Montgomery. He went to Sidney Lanier High School.

Campbell was part of the Triangle Club at Princeton University with F. Scott Fitzgerald and was a friend and admirer of Zelda Fitzgerald who gave him one of her paintings. He was tall and blond. A friend of F. Scott Fitzgerald from Princeton, he remained a part of their social circle after they were married.

He wrote for the Journal of Commerce before getting into advertising.

Campbell was a charter member of the American National Theater and Academy and served as its chairman of the board.

His play Solid South was set in the Southern United States during the reconstruction era. It starred Richard Bennett, Moffat Johnston, Jessie Royce Landis, Owen Davis Jr., and Bette Davis. Rouben Mamoulian directed.

== Plays ==
He wrote several plays including three that were staged:

- Madam Malissa (1924)
- Immoral Isabella?, a three act comedy presented by Chamberlain Brown.
- Solid South, performed at various venues in the Midwestern United States during the spring and summer of 1930 and in October of the same year opened at the Lyceum Theatre in New York City. It was a three act play published in New York by S. French (1931).

His other plays include:

- Foolish Sunset
- Shakespeare Smiles, a Comedy in One Act. New York; D. Appe (1924)
- Gestures; a Comedy in One Act. New York (1925)
- The Girl Who Slipped
- The Bachelor Queen (1927)
- Isabella (1927)
