= First Baptist Church of Wetumpka =

Historic church in Alabama, United States

- U.S. National Register of Historic Places
- Alabama Register of Landmarks and Heritage
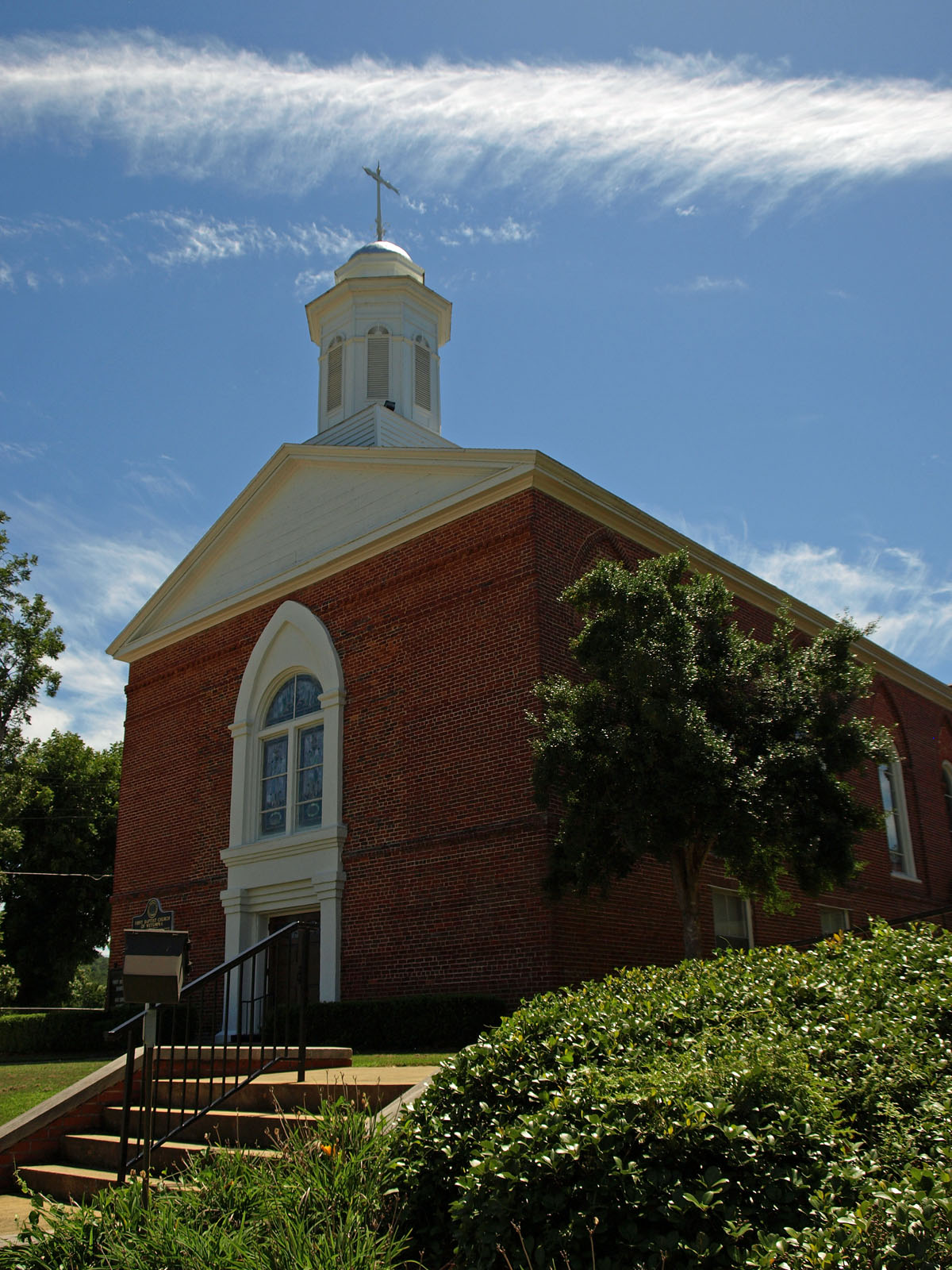

- Location within Alabama Location within the United States
- Location: 205 West Bridge St., Wetumpka, Alabama
- Coordinates: 32°32′19″N 86°12′36″W
- Area: 1.3 acres (0.53 ha)
- Built: 1846–52
- Architect: Lockwood, Frank; Okel & Cooper, et al.
- Architectural style: Gothic Revival, Classical Revival
- NRHP reference No.: 06001101

Significant dates
- Added to NRHP: October 24, 2008
- Designated ARLH: June 3, 1977

First Baptist Church Of Wetumpka is a Baptist church complex at 205 West Bridge Street in Wetumpka, Alabama, United States. It is affiliated with the Southern Baptist Convention. It consisted of several connected buildings, centered on an original brick sanctuary building that was built from 1846 to 1852. The original sanctuary was slated for demolition by May 2020 following tornado damage. The grounds also include 1928–29 educational building, a 1959–60 second educational and office addition, a modern sanctuary built in 1967, and educational wing and fellowship hall that was completed in 1991. All of the buildings are centered on the original sanctuary and are linked together by a series of passages and corridors at the rear of the property. The original sanctuary was added to the Alabama Register of Landmarks and Heritage in 1977 and the National Register of Historic Places in 2008.

== History ==
The church congregation traces its origins back to the Coosa River Baptist Church that was established in the area in May 1821. The congregation relocated to Wetumpka in 1837 and combined with another existing congregation, renamed as the Coosa River Church of Wetumpka. It assumed its current name of First Baptist Church Of Wetumpka in 1842. Following major fires in the town during 1844 and again in 1845, the congregation began building a new brick building west of the river on property donated to them by Seth Paddock Storrs. Storrs was a member of the Presbyterian denomination, but was married to a devout Baptist woman from Massachusetts.

Construction of the historic brick sanctuary began in 1846, but proceeded slowly for several years due to funding issues. Eventually the leaders of the church turned over fund-raising to the women of the congregation, who held "bake sales, picnics, barbecues and quilt sales" until the needed funding was raised to complete the building. It was finished by the spring of 1852 and dedicated on July 11, 1852. It was substantially altered in 1909 by leading Montgomery architect Frank Lockwood. The alterations included an almost complete remodelling of the interior and the replacement of the Gothic Revival pointed arch windows with new round arched stained glass replacements.

Having outgrown the original building by the 1960s, the congregation had a new 687-seat capacity sanctuary constructed adjacent to the original. It was built to the designs of Montgomery architect Tom B. Kirkland. The new sanctuary was dedicated on July 11, 1967, exactly 115 years after the dedication of the original. The original sanctuary was rarely used after this point and had substantially deteriorated by the 1990s due to a leaking roof. The congregation, fearing the loss of the building, raised funds for a full restoration of the interior and exterior of what was now referred to as the "historic chapel." It was completed in time for a rededication on July 11, 1998.

The original sanctuary suffered extensive damage on January 19, 2019, with the entire roof and belfry being removed by an EF2 tornado. The majority of the congregation voted in 2020 to demolish the historic sanctuary. A weakened support structure and mold were noted as primary concerns. The historic stained glass windows and other artifacts were removed in late May 2020 in preparation for demolition.

== See also ==
- Historical Marker Database
