= Sumter County Courthouse (Alabama) =

- U.S. National Register of Historic Places
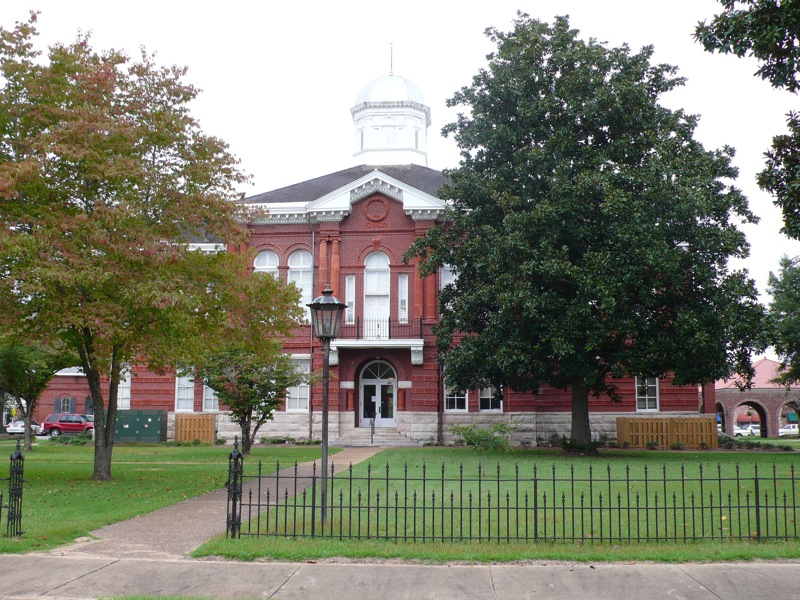

- Location within Alabama Location within the United States
- Interactive map showing the location of Sumter County Courthouse
- Location: US 11, Livingston, Alabama
- Coordinates: 32°34′58″N 88°11′18″W
- Area: 2 acres (0.81 ha)
- Built: 1902
- Built by: Dabbs, C.H. & Co.
- Architect: Frederick Ausfeld & Chapman
- Architectural style: Beaux Arts
- NRHP reference No.: 72000180
- Added to NRHP: March 24, 1972

The Sumter County Courthouse is a historic county courthouse building in Livingston, Alabama.

== Description ==
Designed in the Beaux-Arts style, it has served as the Sumter County Courthouse since its completion in 1902. The two-story structure is built of red brick, with terracotta architectural elements, over a stone clad foundation. It is topped by a dome and cupola. It was designed by Chapman and Frederick Ausfeld.

The Sumter County Courthouse is centered in a large town square, that is enclosed within an iron fence. An adjacent bored well pavilion, built in brick in 1924; and an 1830s brick probate office; also occupy the square.

It was added to the National Register of Historic Places on March 24, 1972.

== See also ==
- National Register of Historic Places listings in Sumter County, Alabama
- Courthouses on the National Register of Historic Places in Alabama
