= Shepherd Building (Montgomery, Alabama) =

- U.S. National Register of Historic Places
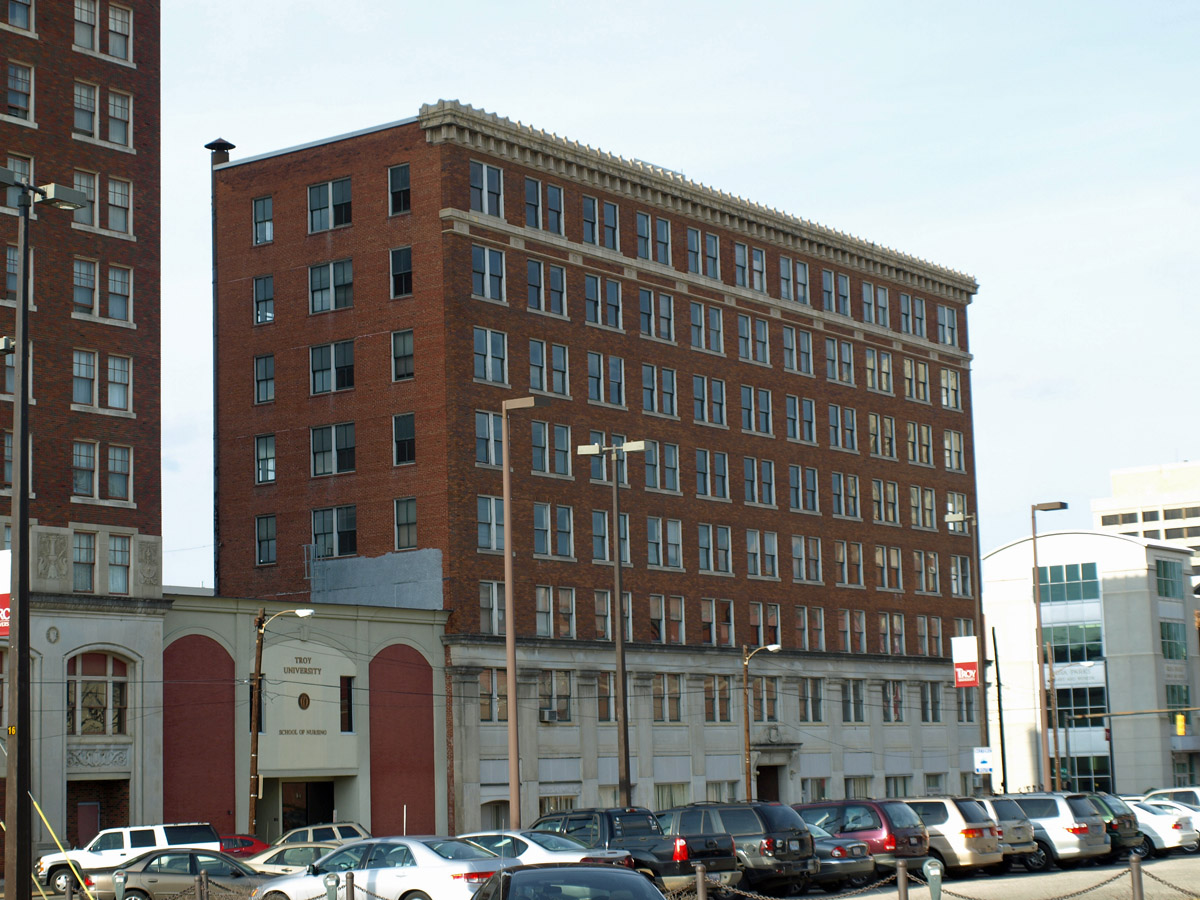
- The Shepherd Building in 2009

- Location within Alabama Location within the United States
- Location: 312 Montgomery Street, Montgomery, Alabama
- Coordinates: 32°22′33″N 86°18′42″W
- Area: less than one acre
- Built: 1922
- Architectural style: Skyscraper, Early Skyscraper
- NRHP reference No.: 86001106
- Added to NRHP: May 22, 1986

The Shepherd Building was a building in Montgomery, Alabama, U.S. It was built in 1922, and designed by architect Frederick Ausfeld. It was donated to Troy University in 2002. It was listed on the National Register of Historic Places from May 22, 1986, to its demolition in November 2010.
