= Sidney Lanier High School =

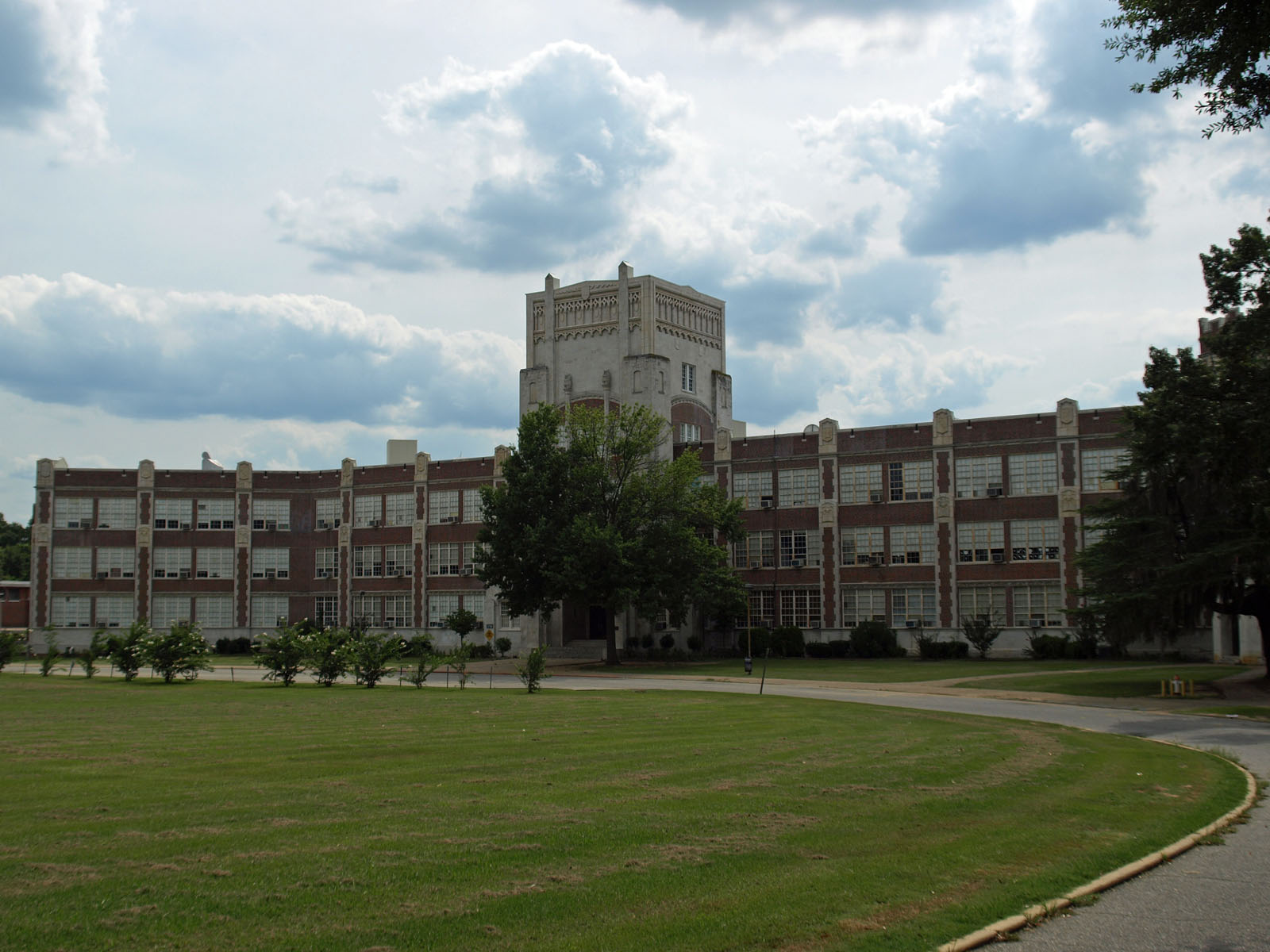

Location
- 1756 S. Court Street; Montgomery, Alabama 36104; United States; 32°21′22″N 86°18′36″W

Information
- School type: Public high school
- Established: 1910 (116 years ago)
- School district: Montgomery Public Schools
- Grades: 9–12
- Colors: Blue and white
- Nickname: Poets, Big Blue, The Castle

Alabama Register of Landmarks and Heritage
- Designated: October 31, 2013

Sidney Lanier High School was a public high school in Montgomery, Alabama, United States.

== History ==
Established in 1910 on the southern outskirts of downtown Montgomery, Alabama, the school was named for a Southern poet, Sidney Lanier, who lived in Montgomery during 1866–67.

The high school moved to new facilities in 1929 further to the south. The late Gothic Revival building was constructed 1928–1929 to consolidate the original Lanier (then in a building now known as Baldwin Magnet School, formerly Baldwin Junior High School) and Montgomery County High School (now the Cloverdale campus of Huntingdon College, formerly Cloverdale Junior High School).

The name of the new school was decided by the outcome of a football game between the two schools in the fall of 1928, which Lanier won.

Frederick Ausfeld was the architect, and Algernon Blair the contractor. The building opened for class in September 1929 and was dubbed "The Million Dollar School" due to its approximate cost.

=== Integration and closing ===
The school was desegregated in September 1964. The first black students graduated in the summer of 1967. As late as the 1960s, the student population of Lanier was all white. In 2004, the student population included only six white students. Besides white flight, another factor influencing this change can be found in the neighborhood schools concept adopted by the Montgomery Board of Education.

In 2020 the school district's board of education voted to change the school's name, but in 2022 the board decided to merge the school with George Washington Carver High School, and "the Lanier building will no longer be in use after the students move". The school closed in May 2024.

== Academics ==
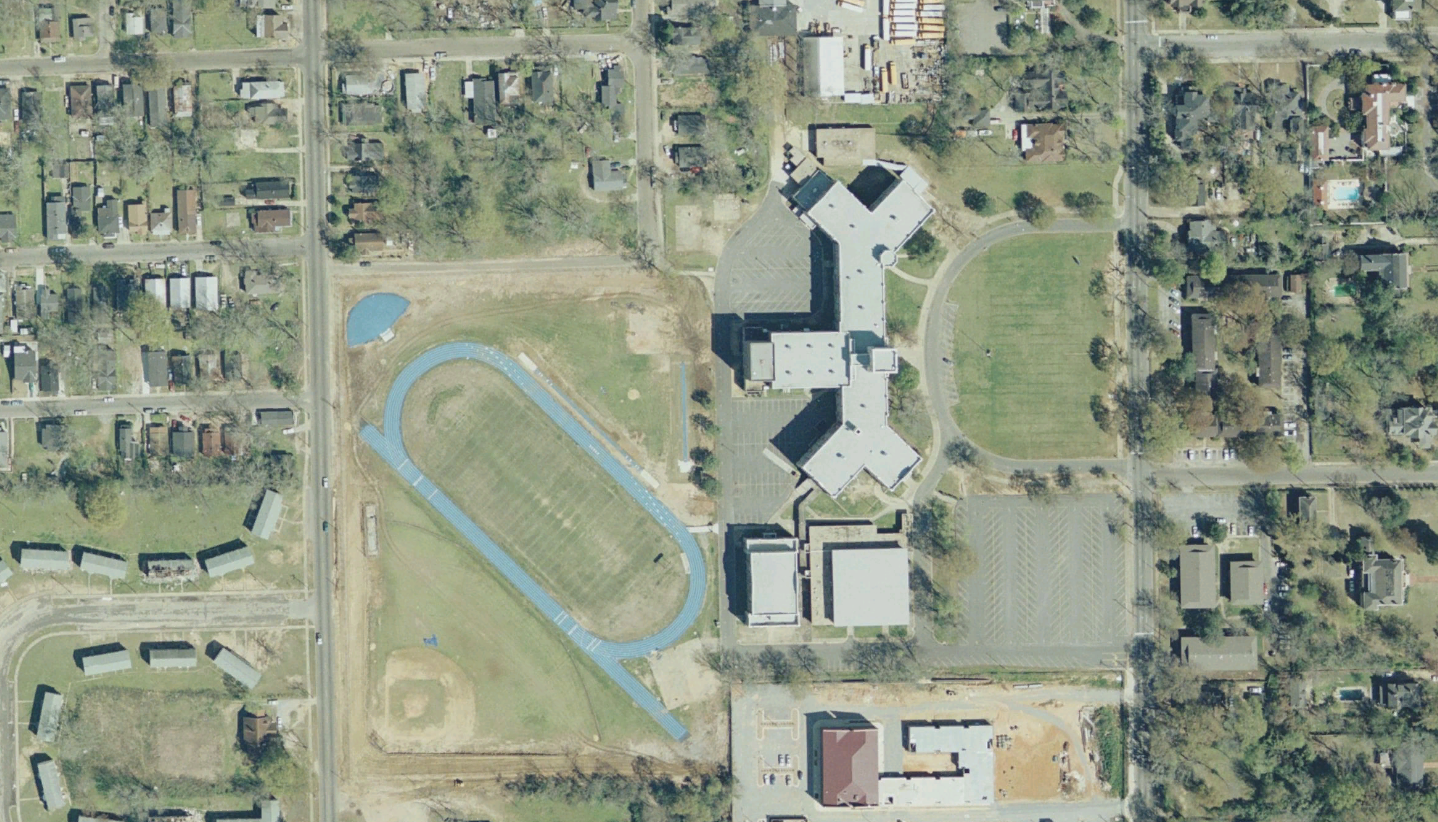
The campus

In 2006, Lanier was the only traditional public high school in Montgomery to meet federally mandated No Child Left Behind standards.

== Athletics ==
Lanier High School won state championships in all high school sports. In 1966, Lanier was triple state champs, winning top honors in football, basketball, and track and field. 1966 was the first of three successive state championships in football, with the school's last state championship occurring in 1968.

Football coach Bobby Wilson and basketball coach Bill Joiner led their teams in the state for most of the 1960s, winning six football (1957, 1961, 1964, 1966, 1967, and 1968) and four basketball (1962, 1963, 1965, and 1967) state championships in the large high school category. All of the schools athletic operations were ceased in May 2024 when the school was permanently shut down.

=== Lanier–Lee rivalry ===
The Lee–Lanier rivalry in Montgomery was unmatched in the state in the late 1950s and through the 1960s. For years, Sidney Lanier was the only public school for white students in segregated Montgomery. As Montgomery's population began to increase, another school for whites was built in 1955, Robert E. Lee High. Its arrival gave birth to one of the state's biggest high school football rivalries.

Lanier won three Class 4A titles (1966, 1967, 1968) during this era, while Lee won in 1969 and 1970. After 1970, Montgomery schools would win state championships again, but never again would Montgomery dominate football in Alabama like it did in the 1960s. Racial integration and the emergence of Jeff Davis High School as a football power in 1970 diminished the Lee–Lanier rivalry.

=== The Lanier dynasty ===
Lanier started its tradition of winning State Championships in prep football in 1920, winning the first recognized state championship in Alabama. Lanier was champion again in 1922 and 1939. Later, in the mid-1950s, came the "Wilson Era" in Lanier football.

Lanier also achieved a sustained dynasty in basketball, playing in more state championship games and winning more state championships in the large high school category than any other high school from the 1920s through its most recent championship in 2001. In the early 1950s Sidney Lanier High School won the state championship in baseball 6 years in a row (1950–1955).

=== Famous players ===
Famous players at Lanier abound, but two stand out in particular: Bart Starr and Richmond Flowers, Jr.

Bryan Bartlett Starr was a Sidney Lanier athlete in the early 1950s. It would be in the NFL where Starr would make his mark. He was drafted by the Green Bay Packers in the 17th round in 1956, arguably the best bargain in NFL draft history. Playing under legendary coach Vince Lombardi, Starr guided the Packers to six Western Division titles, five league titles, and two Super Bowl victories. He played for Green Bay until retiring in 1971. Six years later, Starr was inducted into the NFL Hall of Fame. He served as the Packers' head coach from 1975 to 1983. In 1976, he was inducted into the Alabama Sports Hall of Fame.

Richmond Flowers, Jr. was the original "Super Recruit." Flowers attracted the attention of college coaches from California to Maine. He earned All-American football honors at the University of Tennessee and was drafted out of college by the Dallas Cowboys in 1970. He was a member of Dallas' Super Bowl V team. In 1999, he was named one of the top 25 collegiate receivers of the 20th Century by "Athlon Magazine".

As a track star, he was unparalleled in Alabama prep history. The focus of a national recruiting battle boiled down to Louisiana State University, Alabama, and Tennessee. He landed at Tennessee where he went on to become an NCAA track champion and Southeastern Conference football star. He was an NCAA hurdles champion and was chosen All-SEC by his sophomore year in football.

It was at Lanier where the legend began. Young Flowers was an accomplished hurdler – the most successful high school hurdler of his time – owning the fastest times in the nation in the 120-yard and 180-yard hurdles. His father, Richmond Flowers Sr., was the state's attorney general at the time and a bitter political foe of then-popular governor, George C. Wallace. That conflict – and young Richmond's rise to stardom – was later documented in a movie titled "Unconquered."

In addition to Starr and Flowers, Johnny Davis (San Francisco 49ers), Reggie Barlow (Tampa Bay Buccaneers), and Jeno James (Carolina Panthers) have also represented Lanier in Super Bowls; all except James were on winning teams. Former Minnesota Vikings quarterback Tarvaris Jackson graduated from Lanier in 2001.

=== Athletics after the Wilson era ===
Coach Bobby Wilson retired after the 1968 season and was replaced by Bill Joiner. One of Coach Joiner's most successful teams was the 1971 team led by future University of Alabama All-State Kicker Bucky Berry, who kicked the game-winning field goal in the Poets' 24–23 upset of Jeff Davis in 1971. The 1972 team was led by future University of Alabama All-SEC running back Johnny Davis. The first African American from Lanier who received an NCAA Division I scholarship, Davis went on to star with the Cleveland Browns in the NFL. Coach Joiner retired from his football coaching duties after the 1973 season.

Joiner's replacement was Cliff Little, former head coach at Montgomery Catholic High. Coach Little's 1977 and 1978 teams reached the state semifinals and won the Region 4 Class 4A titles. The overall record for those two teams was an excellent 21–5. The 1977 squad was eliminated by Berry Birmingham (Hoover), and the 1978 team was eliminated by Jeff Davis in a hard-fought 14–6 game. Both Berry and Jeff Davis went on to win the state title games with relative ease.

In other sports, Lanier won the 2001 boys' basketball state championship (coached by Floyd Matthews) and the 2005 girls' basketball state championship (coached by the aforementioned Steve Holloway).

=== Cross Country ===
Lanier also had a cross country team, there are two teams: the boys' 7th graders and 8th graders and the girls' 7th and 8th graders. Each team was directed by a different coach and have different practice times. The Girls' Cross Country team have run and placed year after year with help of the coach. The boys have mostly gotten first and second for the past years.

== Notable alumni ==
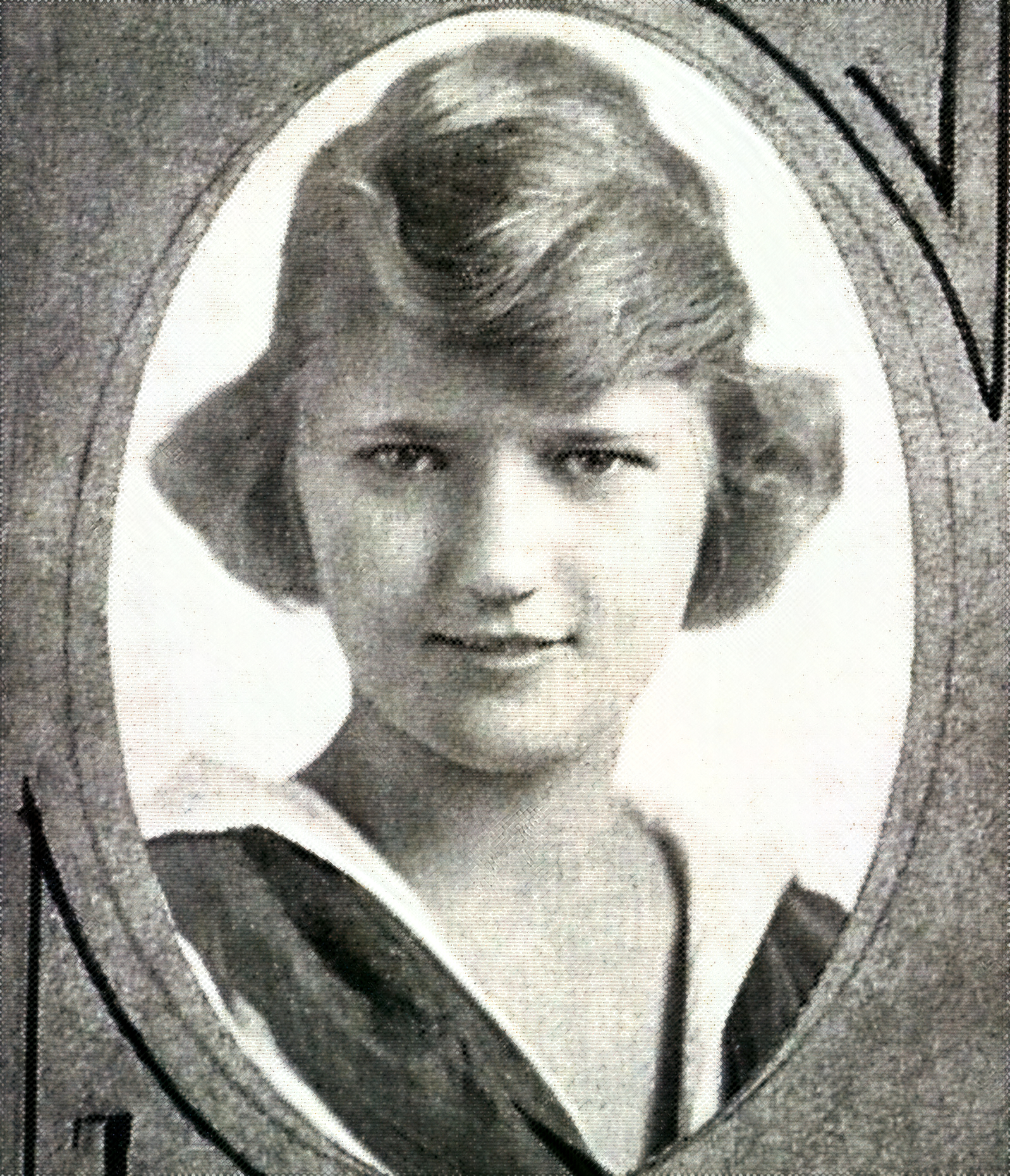
Zelda Fitzgerald in her yearbook photo for Sidney Lanier High School.

The school's notable alumni include:

- Reggie Barlow, former NFL football player
- Lawton Campbell, playwright and friend of Zelda and F. Scott Fitzgerald
- Hosea Chanchez, actor
- Chrys Chukwuma, former professional football player
- Jacory Croskey-Merritt, NFL football player
- Johnny Davis, former NFL football player
- Morris Dees, lawyer, former CEO of the Southern Poverty Law Center
- Zelda Sayre Fitzgerald, socialite, novelist, painter, and wife of F. Scott Fitzgerald
- Richmond Flowers, former NFL football player and track athlete
- Emory Folmar, politician and former mayor of Montgomery, Alabama
- Terry Gabreski, retired United States Air Force Lieutenant General
- Orlando Graham, former NBA basketball player
- Carlos Hendricks, former professional football player
- Jeno James, NFL football player
- Tarvaris Jackson, former NFL football player
- Claude R. Kirk, Jr., politician, 36th Governor of Florida
- Marco Killingsworth, former professional basketball player
- Patrice McClammy, member of the Alabama House of Representatives
- Carl Mundy, retired United States Marine Corps four-star general and 30th commandant of the Marine Corps
- Tommy Neville, NFL football player
- Jimmy Sharpe, former college football coach
- Bart Starr, former NFL football player
- Donell Taylor, former NBA basketball player
- Toni Tennille, singer, member of 1970s group "Captain and Tennille"
- Kathryn Thornton, scientist and a former NASA astronaut
- George Wallace Jr., politician
- Lurleen Wallace, politician, 46th governor of Alabama, wife of George Wallace
- Marcus Webb, former NBA basketball player
- Roman L. Weil, economist
- Hank Williams, country music singer, songwriter, and musician
