= Bell House (Prattville, Alabama) =

Historic house in Alabama, United States

- U.S. National Register of Historic Places
- Alabama Register of Landmarks and Heritage
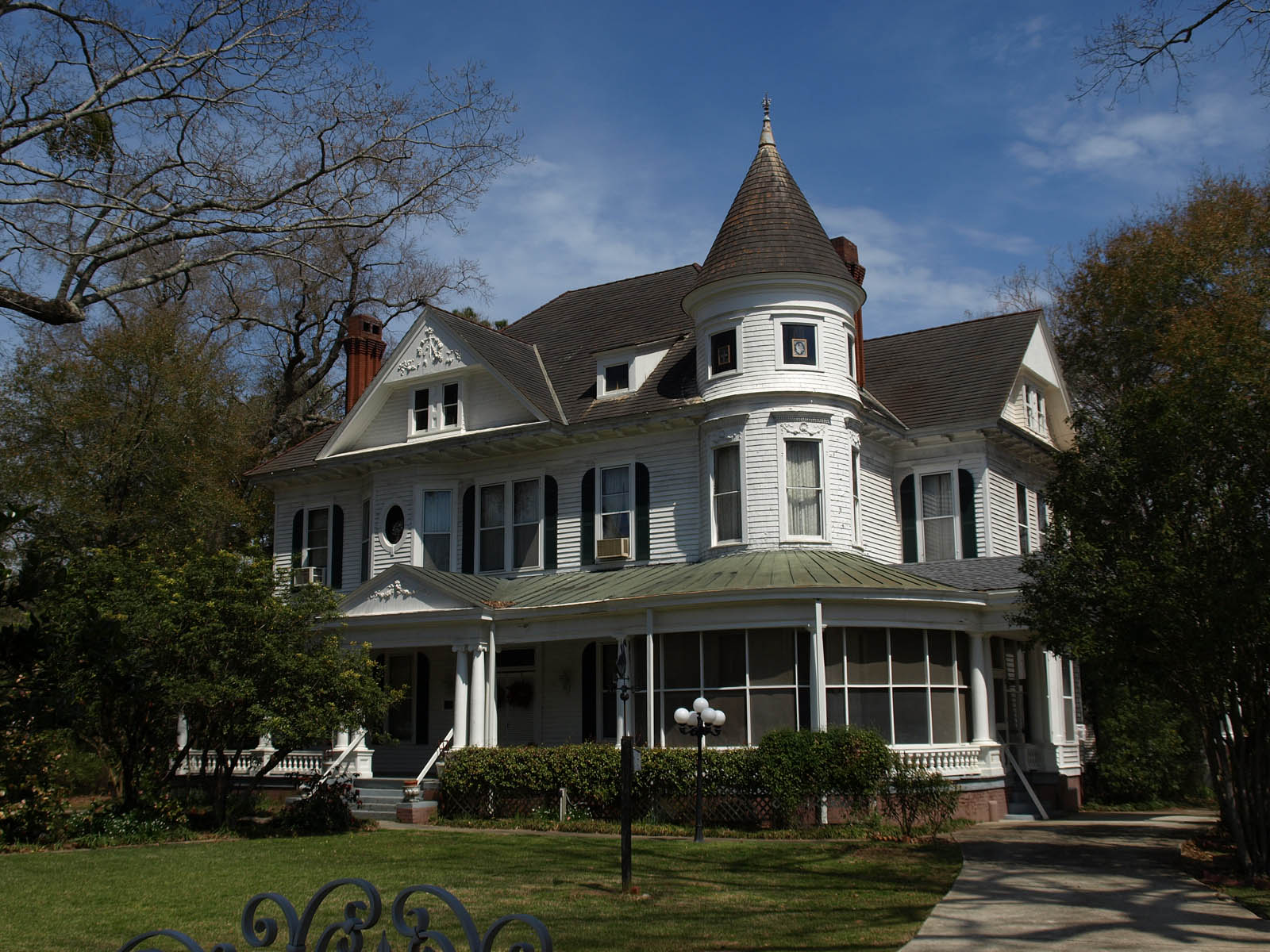
- The house in 2010

- Location within Alabama Location within the United States
- Location: 550 Upper Kingston Rd., Prattville, Alabama
- Coordinates: 32°28′17″N 86°28′40″W
- Area: 1 acre (0.40 ha)
- Built: 1893
- Architect: Lockwood, Frank
- Architectural style: Queen Anne
- NRHP reference No.: 99000150

Significant dates
- Added to NRHP: February 12, 1999
- Designated ARLH: October 7, 1998

The Bell House (also known as Biggs House) is a historic house located at 550 Upper Kingston Road in Prattville, Alabama, United States. It is locally significant as an excellent example of the Queen Anne style of architecture, which reached its zenith in Alabama at the turn of the 20th century and continued locally as late as 1920.

== Description and history ==
The Queen Anne style 2 1/2-story wood-frame house was completed in 1893. Designed by Alabama architect Frank Lockwood, it was added to the National Register of Historic Places on July 17, 1997, and to the Alabama Register of Landmarks and Heritage on October 7, 1998.

Joseph Bennett Bell, son of Jonathan Ezekiel and Georgiana (Bennett) Bell, was born in Greenville, Alabama on November 18, 1859. He was raised in Greenville and moved to Montgomery upon completing his education, and obtained a job as a clerk at a hardware store. Bell married Mary Pratt, daughter of Julia (Smith) and Merrill Pratt, on November 17, 1889. Merrill was the nephew of Prattville town founder Daniel Pratt and inherited half his fortune upon his death in 1873.

The Bells moved to Prattville in early 1890; Joseph served as a manager for the order department of the Daniel Pratt Gin Company as well as a stockholder and manager for the Pratt Company. The Bell House was constructed in 1893. Joseph Bell was listed as a secretary for the Prattville Mercantile Company in 1905, and served as a member of the State Legislature representing Autauga County from 1911 to 1915. In April 1919, he was appointed probate judge of the county, in which post he served until October of the same year.

Joseph and Mary Bell raised their eight children in the Bell House. Joseph died in 1937; Mary followed in 1945. The Bells' daughters Katherine (who served in World War II) and Adelaide lived in the house until they sold it to Thomas H. Walker in October 1949. Nancy and Hyman Hamner later owned the house; in 1970, they sold it to Colonel Ernest and Martha Biggs, the recorded owners as of 1998.

In 1994, the house was used as a filming location for Charles Matthau’s film The Grass Harp, released the next year and based on Truman Capote’s novella of the same name.

== See also ==
- National Register of Historic Places listings in Autauga County, Alabama
- Properties on the Alabama Register of Landmarks and Heritage in Autauga County, Alabama
