= Dr. C. A. Thigpen House =

Historic house in Alabama, US

- U.S. National Register of Historic Places
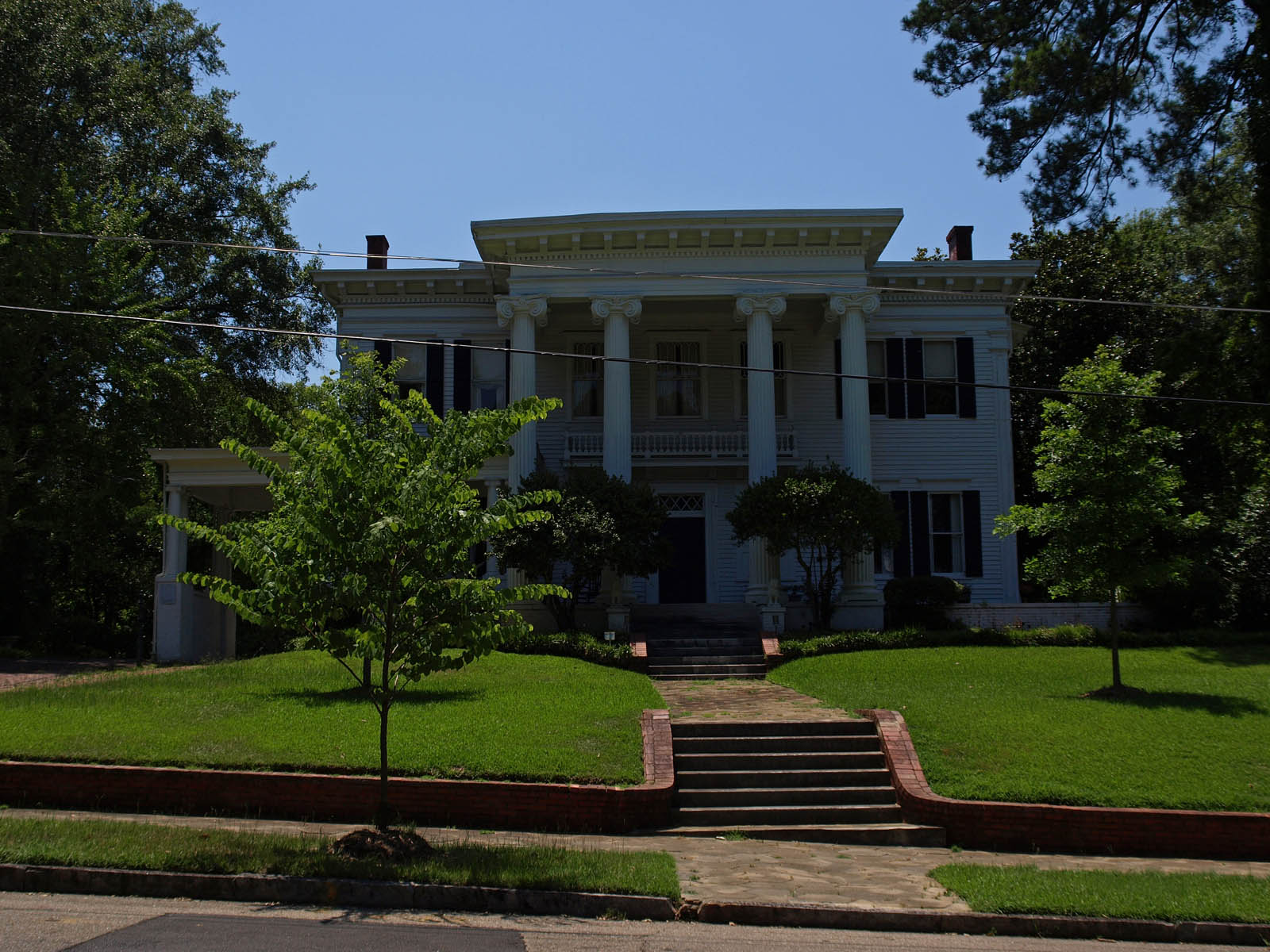
- The Dr. C. A. Thigpen House in 2009

- Location within Alabama Location within the United States
- Location: 1412 South Perry Street, Montgomery, Alabama
- Coordinates: 32°21′33″N 86°18′25″W
- Area: 2 acres (0.81 ha)
- Built: c. 1898; 128 years ago
- Architectural style: Classical Eclecticism
- NRHP reference No.: 77000215
- Added to NRHP: December 13, 1977

The Dr. C. A. Thigpen House is a historic mansion in Montgomery, Alabama, U.S. It was built for Dr. Charles A. Thigpen, a physician, circa 1898. It was designed in the classical style by architect Frank Lockwood. It has been listed on the National Register of Historic Places since December 13, 1977.
