= Bell Building (Montgomery, Alabama) =

- U.S. National Register of Historic Places
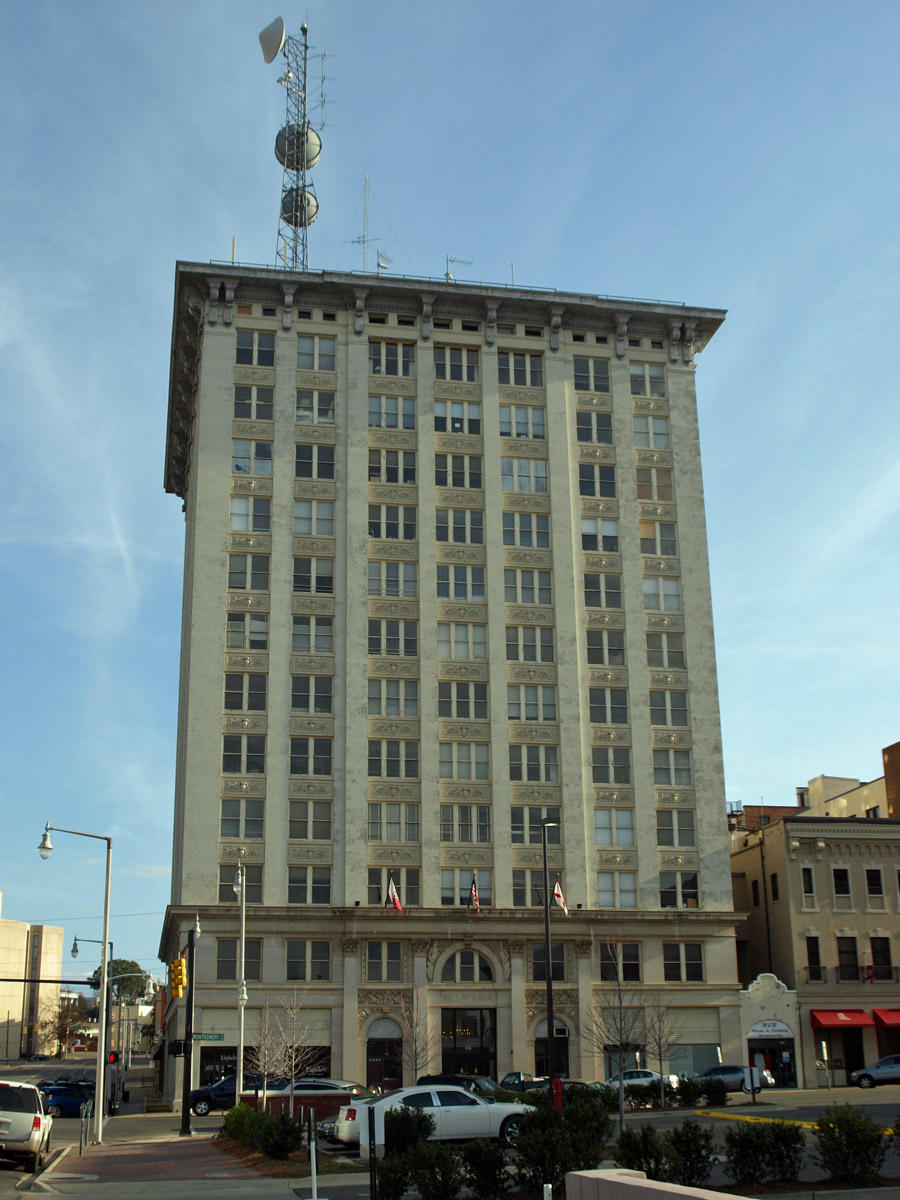

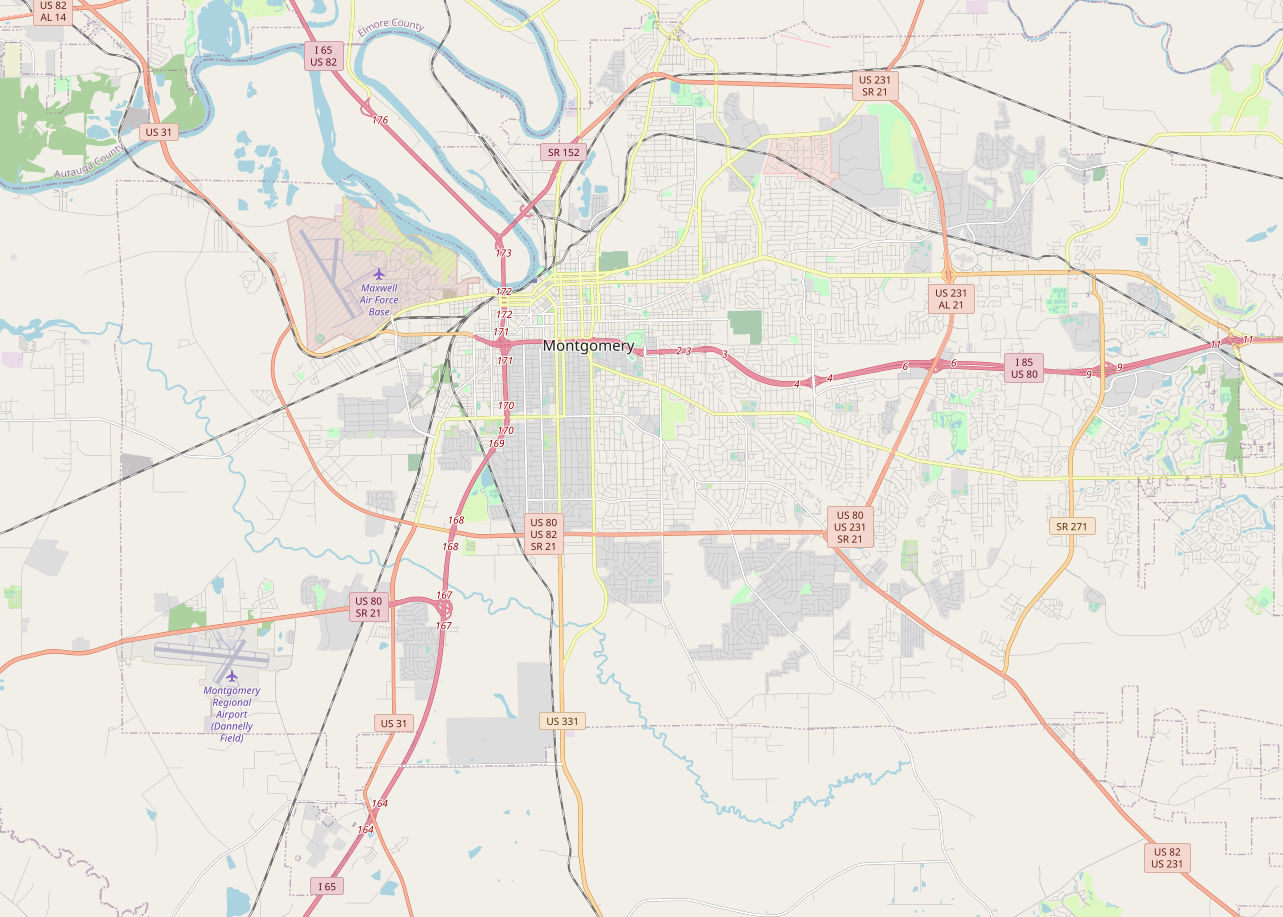
- Location within Montgomery, Alabama Location within Alabama Location within the United States
- Location: 207 Montgomery St., Montgomery, Alabama
- Coordinates: 32°22′36″N 86°18′38″W
- Area: less than one acre
- Built: 1907
- Architect: Ausfeld & Blount; Wescott & Ronneberg
- Architectural style: Late 19th and early 20th century American movements, Sullivanesque
- NRHP reference No.: 81000132
- Added to NRHP: December 15, 1981

The Bell Building is an office building located in downtown Montgomery, Alabama. It was built in 1907 by local businessman Newton J. Bell, and was the tallest building in Montgomery at the time. It was added to the National Register of Historic Places in 1981. The height of the building is 187 feet.

The entire 12th floor and the roof were rented by the Beauvoir Club (the predecessor of the Montgomery Country Club), which had sold their mansion on Perry Street and signed a ten-year lease for the Bell Building.

== Revitalization ==
The Bell Building underwent a multimillion-dollar revitalization to transform the building into high-end apartments and some retail space on the ground levels.

In 2018, the building was undergoing conversion into 88 loft-style apartments, with the project expected to be completed in spring 2019.

== See also ==
- National Register of Historic Places listings in Montgomery County, Alabama
