= Frank Lockwood (architect) =

American architect

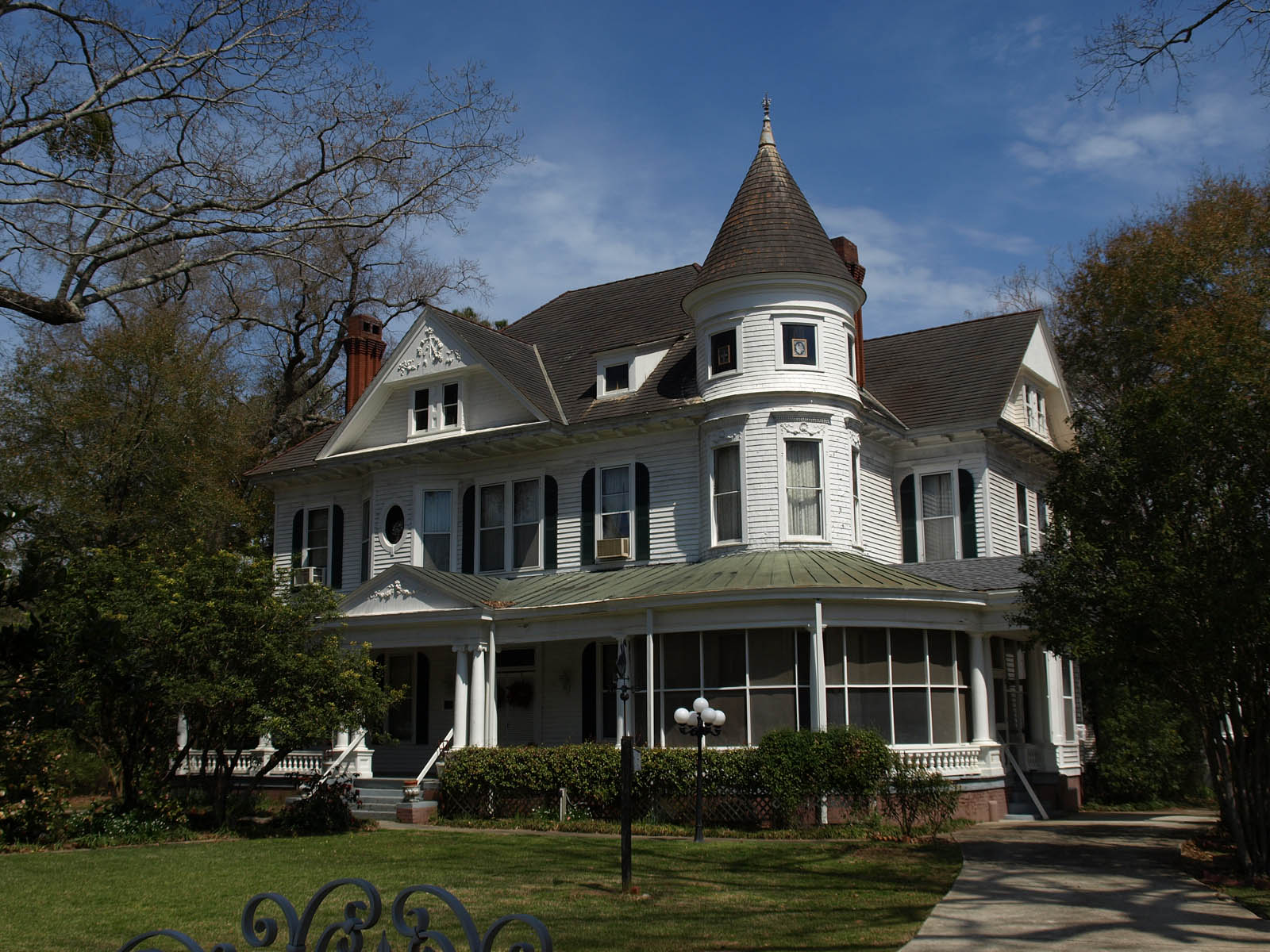
Bell House (1893) in Prattville, Alabama.

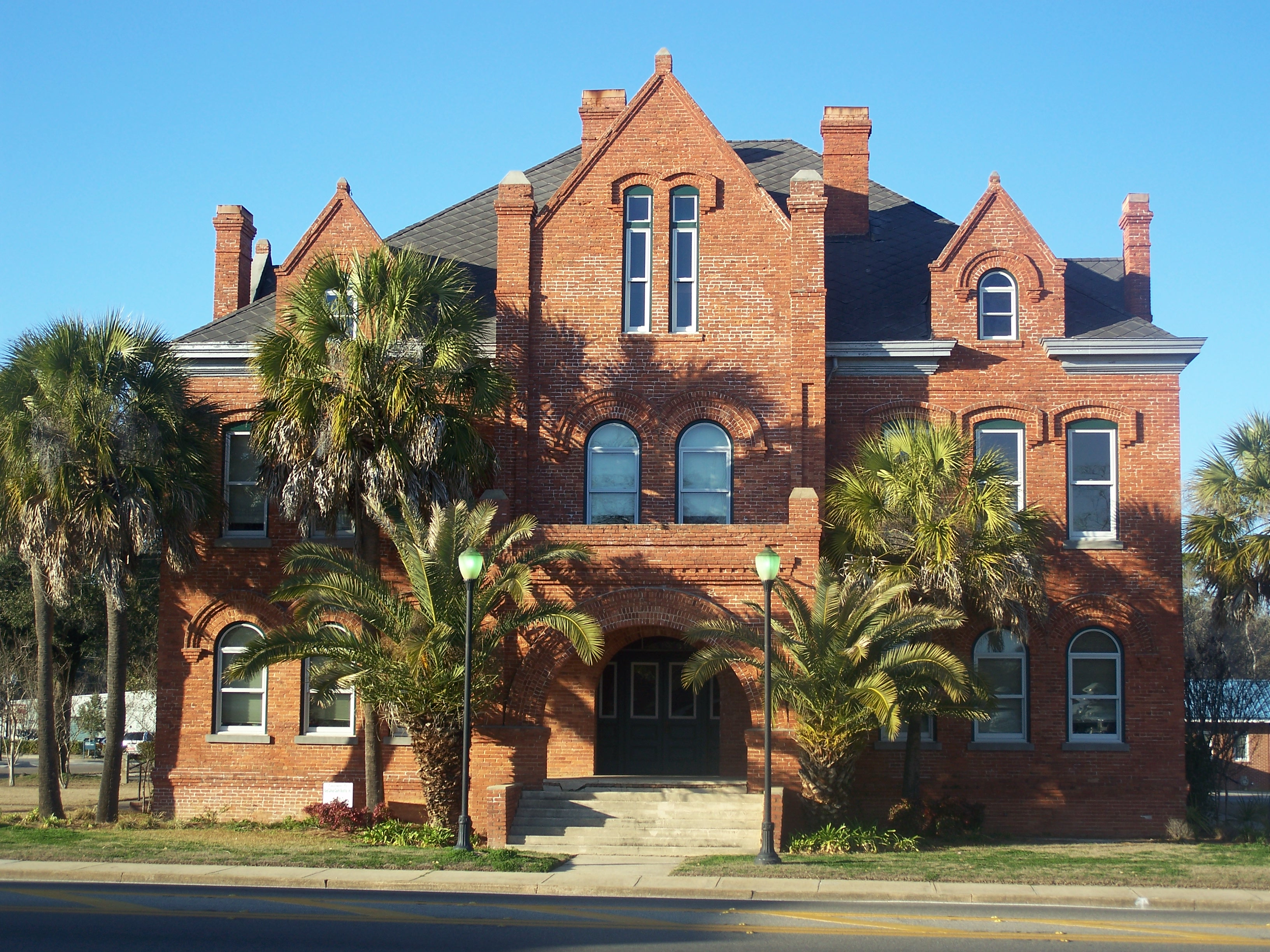
Old Calhoun County Courthouse (1904) in Blountstown, Florida.

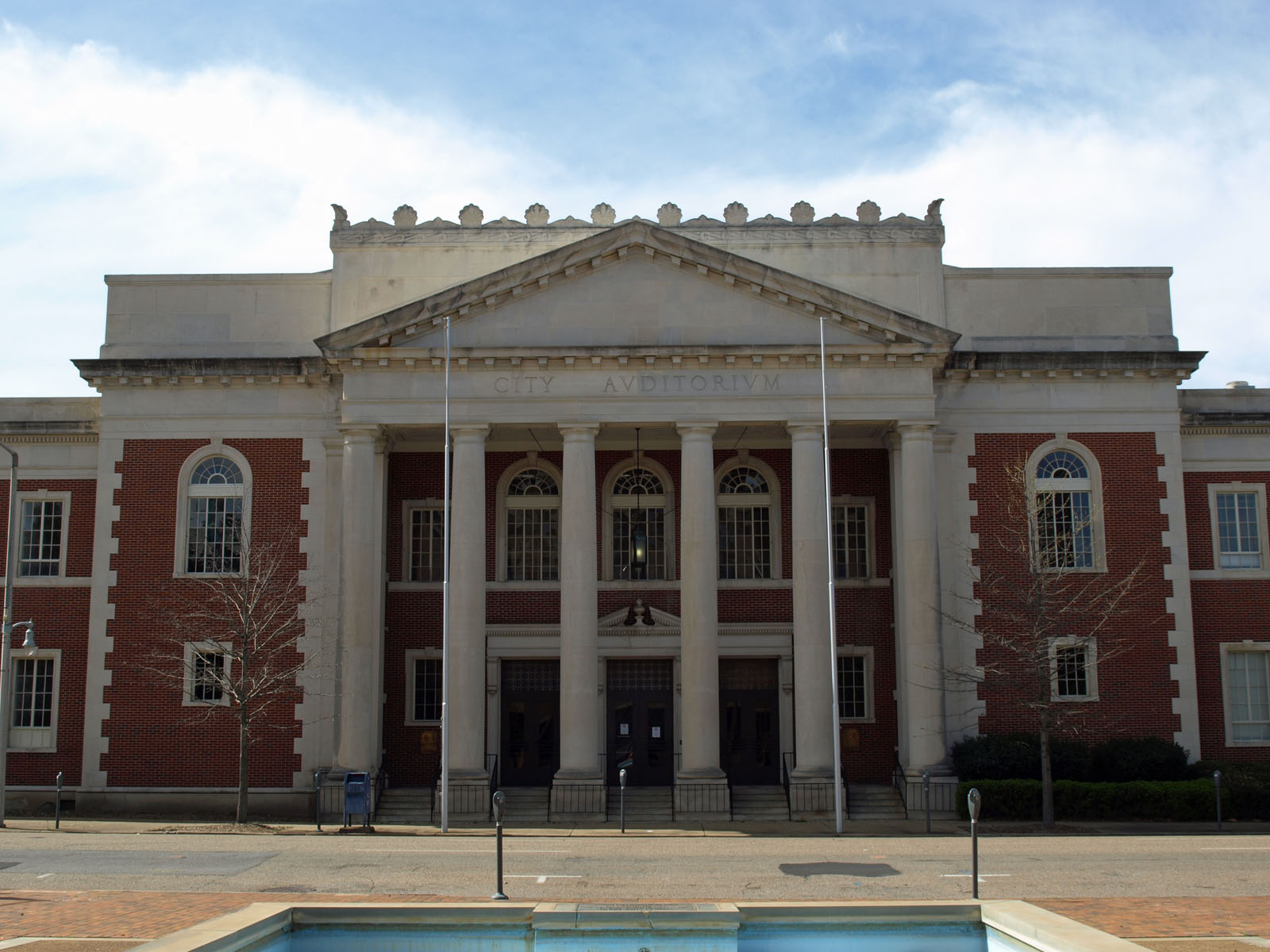
Montgomery City Hall (1936–37) in Montgomery, Alabama.

Frank Lockwood (1865-1935) was one of Montgomery, Alabama's leading architects.

== Biography ==
Lockwood was born in 1865 in New Jersey to English parents. His father was an engineer. Growing up in New York City Frank was a talented singer and was, at one point, offered a contract with the Metropolitan Opera. However, his mother persuaded him to study architecture. After graduating from Princeton University and Pratt Institute he lived in Columbus, Georgia, before moving to Montgomery in 1894.

Lockwood embarked on a 41-year career in Montgomery. He designed scores of residential homes and many important public buildings. He died in 1935 at his home on Adams Avenue.

One of Lockwood's buildings was The Standard Club in Montgomery, designed in 1929. A modern gated community was later built on the site and called Lockwood.

== Works ==
A number of his works are listed on the U.S. National Register of Historic Places.

Works include (with attribution):

- Alabama State Capitol (north and south wings), Montgomery, Alabama, National Historic Landmark
- Avant House, 909 Sanford Rd. Andalusia, Alabama, NRHP-listed
- Bell House, 550 Upper Kingston Rd. Prattville, Alabama, NRHP-listed
- Brewaker Estate, 435 E Fairview Ave.Montgomery, Alabama
- Gilmer Estate, 1655 Gilmer Ave. Montgomery, Alabama
- Leonel Weil Estate, 251 E. Fairview Ave. Montgomery, Alabama, Built for Leonel Weil and Cecile Rea (Rich) Weil in 1925.
- Covington County Courthouse and Jail, 101 N. Court Sq. Andalusia, Alabama, NRHP-listed
- Demopolis Public School (built 1914), 601 S. Main Ave. Demopolis, Alabama, NRHP-listed
- First Baptist Church of Wetumpka, 205 West Bridge St. Wetumpka, Alabama, NRHP-listed
- First National Bank Building, 101 S. Cotton St. Andalusia, Alabama, NRHP-listed
- Buildings on the campus of Huntingdon College: Bellingrath Hall, Houghton Memorial Library, and Miriam Jackson Home
- Old Calhoun County Courthouse, 314 E. Central Ave. Blountstown, Florida, NRHP-listed
- Marcus Meyer Skinner House, 2612 Summerfield Rd. Selma, Alabama, NRHP-listed
- Dr. C. A. Thigpen House, 1412 S. Perry St. Montgomery, Alabama, NRHP-listed
- Troy High School (1917), 436 Elm St. Troy, Alabama, NRHP-listed, demolished in 2010.
- Montgomery City Hall (1936–37), Montgomery, Alabama. Completed after Lockwood's death to replace the original city hall that burned in 1932. Construction was delayed by a lack of funds during the Great Depression.
