= Covington County Courthouse and Jail =

Historic district in Alabama, United States

- U.S. National Register of Historic Places
- U.S. Historic district
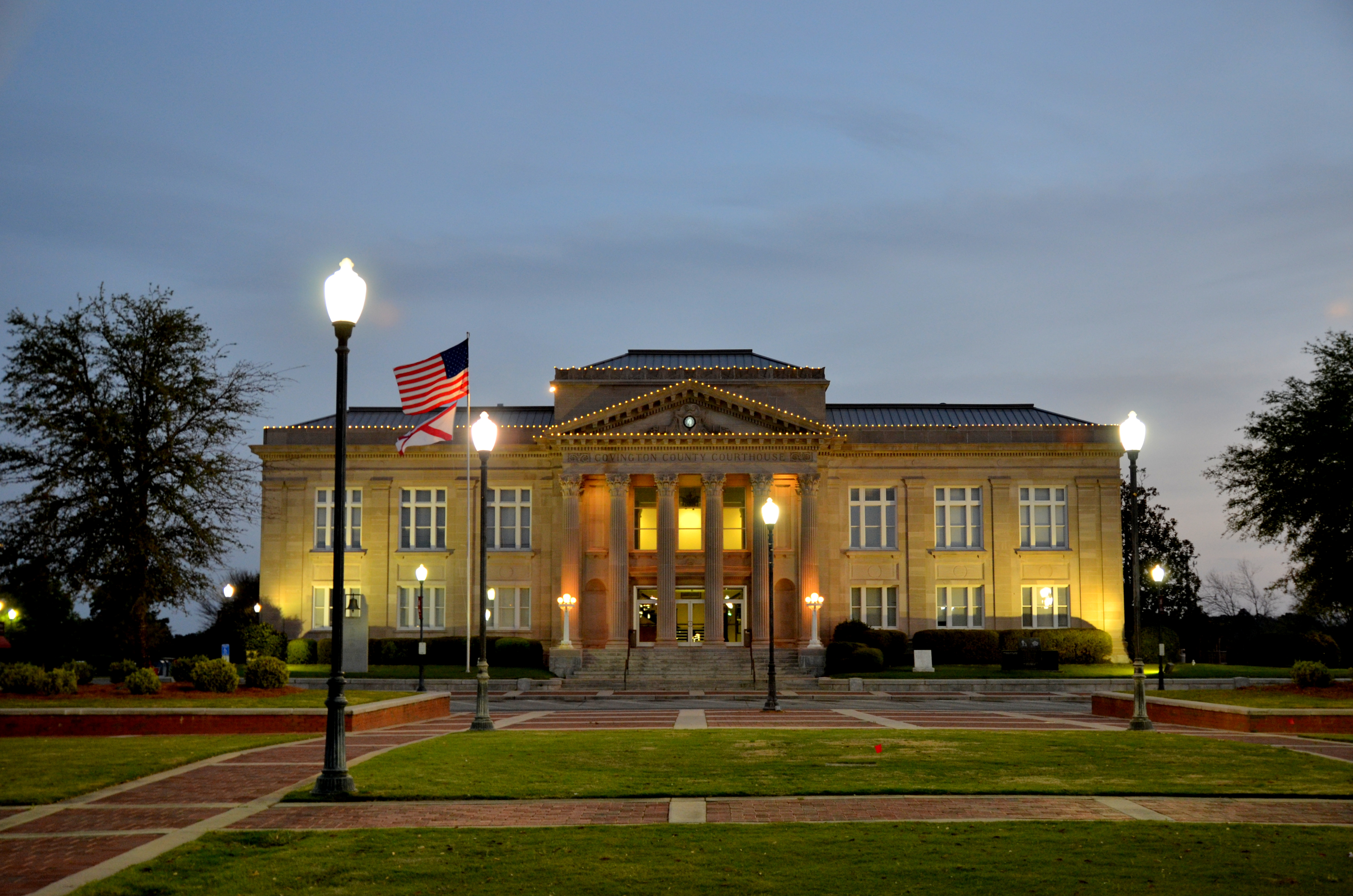
- The courthouse in March 2012

- Location within Alabama Location within the United States
- Interactive map showing the location of Covington County Courthouse and Jail
- Location: 101 N. Court Sq., Andalusia, Alabama
- Coordinates: 31°18′31″N 86°28′56″W
- Area: 2 acres (0.81 ha)
- Built: 1914–1916
- Architect: Frank Lockwood & Frederick Ausfeld
- Architectural style: Beaux Arts, Italianate
- NRHP reference No.: 88003240
- Added to NRHP: January 28, 1989

The Covington County Courthouse and Jail is a historic courthouse in Andalusia, the seat of Covington County, Alabama, United States. It was built from 1914 to 1916 along with a jail. Together, the buildings were listed on the National Register of Historic Places in 1989.

== History ==
The 1916 courthouse is the fifth to serve Covington County. The fourth courthouse was built of brick in 1896 in the center of Courthouse Square (which sits in front of the current courthouse). When the Central of Georgia Railway reached Andalusia in 1899, followed shortly by the Alabama and Florida Railroad, the town saw massive growth; population rose from 270 at the 1890 census to 2,480 by 1910. Having outgrown the prior courthouse, construction on a new courthouse began in 1914 and was completed in 1916. A jail was built behind the courthouse.

== Architecture ==
=== Courthouse ===
The courthouse is designed in a Beaux-Arts style, common among public buildings in the early 20th century. The original portion of the building is rectangular and built of combed granite. Two wings were built onto the rear of the building, which were later enclosed in the middle.

At the center of the façade is a hexastyle portico with Corinthian columns supporting a denticulated triangular pediment. A medallion with a clock adorns the pediment. Three entry doors, since replaced with modern medal-frame doors, are separated by Corinthian pilasters and topped with a simple lintel. The doors are flanked by semi-domed niches. On the second floor, three sets of three stacked windows sit above the entry.

Windows on the front of the building outside the portico are sets of three one-over-one double-hung windows on each floor. The second floor windows each have decorative sills, and relief panels sit below. Windows on the east and west sides of the building, including the wing additions, have only two windows per set. Entries are finished similarly to the front, Corinthian pilasters supporting a bracketed cornice.

The interior is centered on an octagonal atrium, with floors of white marble and walls of grey marble with gold leaf accents. A Y-shaped staircase at the rear of the atrium leads to a second-floor gallery and offices.

=== Jail ===
The jail is a two-story, T-shaped, red brick structure with Italianate details. It features a parapet roof with a bracketed eave, simulating a mansard roof. Quoins on the building corners, dentils between the brackets, and decorative green and white tile panels provide ornamentation to the building. The main entry, facing the rear of the courthouse, is on a porch treated similarly to the rest of the building.

== See also ==
- List of county courthouses in Alabama
