= First Baptist Church =

First Baptist Church may refer to:

== Canada ==
- First Baptist Church (Amherstburg), Ontario
- First Baptist Church (Toronto), Ontario
- First Baptist Church (Ottawa), Ontario
- First Baptist Church (Halifax), Nova Scotia, involved in the founding of Acadia University

== Colombia ==
- First Baptist Church (San Andrés)

== United States ==
=== Alabama ===
- First Baptist Church (Bay Minette, Alabama)
- First Baptist Church, East Thomas
- Gardendale First Baptist Church (Gardendale, Alabama), a Southern Baptist megachurch in Gardendale
- First Baptist Church (Greenville, Alabama)
- First Baptist Church (Huntsville, Alabama), a Baptist church on the NRHP in Alabama
- First Baptist Church (Jasper, Alabama), a Southern Baptist church
- First Baptist Church, Kingston
- First Baptist Church (Montgomery, Alabama), also known as the Brick-A-Day Church
- First Baptist Church (South Perry Street, Montgomery, Alabama), a Baptist church and historic landmark
- First Baptist Church (Selma, Alabama)
- First Baptist Church of Wetumpka

=== Arizona ===
- First Baptist Church (Casa Grande, Arizona)
- First Baptist Church (Flagstaff, Arizona)
- First Baptist Church (Phoenix, Arizona)

=== Arkansas ===
- First Baptist Church (Eudora, Arkansas)
- First Baptist Church (Heber Springs, Arkansas)
- First Baptist Church (Little Rock, Arkansas)
- First Baptist Church (Marvell, Arkansas)
- First Baptist Church of Springdale, a Southern Baptist church and the largest church in Arkansas

=== California ===
- First Baptist Church (Bakersfield, California)
- First Baptist Church (Boron, California)
- First Baptist Church of Los Angeles, designated Los Angeles Historic Cultural Monument 237 in 1981
- First Baptist Church of Orange
- First Baptist Church of Santa Ana, Orange County

=== Colorado ===
- First Baptist Church (Alamosa, Colorado)
- First Baptist Church of Boulder
- First Baptist Church of Denver
- First Baptist Church (Greeley, Colorado)
- First Baptist Church (Trinidad, Colorado)

=== Connecticut ===
- First Baptist Church (Bridgeport, Connecticut)
- First Baptist Church (Hartford, Connecticut) also known as the First Cathedral

=== Florida ===
- First Baptist Church (Jacksonville, Florida), in downtown Jacksonville
- First Baptist Church (Lake Wales, Florida)
- First Baptist Church (Madison, Florida)

=== Georgia ===
- First Baptist Church (Atlanta), a megachurch in Dunwoody
- First Baptist Church (Augusta, Georgia), a former Baptist church and historic site
- First Baptist Church (Columbus, Georgia), part of Church Square which is
- First Baptist Church (Panama City, Florida), a megachurch
- First Baptist Church (Savannah, Georgia)
- First Baptist Church (Woodstock, Georgia), a megachurch

=== Idaho ===
- First Baptist Church of Emmett, Emmett
- Jerome First Baptist Church

=== Indiana ===
- First Baptist Church (Columbus, Indiana)
- First Baptist Church (Hammond, Indiana), an Independent Baptist church
- First Baptist Church (Muncie, Indiana)
- First Baptist Church (Salem, Indiana)
- First Baptist Church (West Baden Springs, Indiana)

=== Iowa ===
- First Baptist Church (Davenport, Iowa)
- First Baptist Church of West Union

=== Kansas ===
- First Baptist Church (Council Grove, Kansas), listed on the NRHP in Kansas

=== Kentucky ===
- First Baptist Church (Elizabethtown, Kentucky)
- First Baptist Church on Clinton, historically black congregation in Frankfort
- First Baptist Church on St. Clair, Frankfort
- First Baptist Church (Murray, Kentucky)
- First Baptist Church (Owensboro, Kentucky)
- First Baptist Church (Paintsville, Kentucky)

=== Maine ===
- First Baptist Church of Bowdoin and Coombs Cemetery
- First Baptist Church (East Lamoine, Maine)
- First Baptist Church (Portland, Maine)
- First Baptist Church (Sedgwick, Maine)
- First Baptist Church, Former (Skowhegan, Maine)
- First Baptist Church (Waterboro, Maine)
- First Baptist Church (Waterville, Maine)

=== Maryland ===
- First Baptist Church (Cumberland, Maryland)

=== Massachusetts ===
- First Baptist Church (Boston, Massachusetts), a National Historic Landmark
- First Baptist Church (Cambridge, Massachusetts)
- First Baptist Church (Fall River, Massachusetts)
- First Baptist Church (Framingham, Massachusetts)
- First Baptist Church of Medfield, for Norfolk County
- First Baptist Church (Methuen, Massachusetts)
- First Baptist Church (New Bedford, Massachusetts)
- First Baptist Church in Newton (Massachusetts)
- First Baptist Church (Stoneham, Massachusetts)
- First Baptist Church and Society, Swansea
- First Baptist Church of Wollaston

=== Michigan ===
- First Baptist Church (Detroit, Michigan)
- First Baptist Church of Grand Blanc
- First Baptist Church (Lansing, Michigan)

=== Minnesota ===
- First Baptist Church (Garden City, Minnesota)
- River City Church, formerly First Baptist Church, Minneapolis
- First Baptist Church (Saint Paul, Minnesota)

=== Mississippi ===
- First Baptist Church of Biloxi

=== Missouri ===
- First Baptist Church (Columbia, Missouri)
- First Baptist Church City of St. Louis, founded as First African Baptist Church

=== Montana ===
- First Baptist Church (Bozeman, Montana), listed on the NRHP in Gallatin County
- First Baptist Church (Hardin, Montana)
- First Baptist Church (Helena, Montana)
- First Baptist Church (Great Falls, Montana), on Interstate 15 Business
- First Baptist Church (Stevensville, Montana), listed on the NRHP in Ravalli County

=== Nebraska ===
- First Baptist Church (Red Cloud, Nebraska)

=== New Hampshire ===
- First Baptist Church of Cornish
- First Baptist Church of Gilmanton, or Lower Gilmanton Church

=== New Jersey ===
- First Baptist Church (Hoboken, New Jersey)
- First Baptist Church (Hopewell, New Jersey)

=== New Mexico ===
- First Baptist Church (Las Vegas, New Mexico)

=== New York ===
- First Baptist Church of Camillus
- First Baptist Church and Cook Memorial Building, Carthage
- First Baptist Church (Charleston, New York)
- First Baptist Church of Cold Spring (Nelsonville, New York)
- First Baptist Church of Deerfield
- First Baptist Church of Fairport
- First Baptist Church (Brockport, New York)
- First Baptist Church (Geneva, New York)
- First Baptist Church of Interlaken
- First Baptist Church (Moravia, New York)
- First Baptist Church (Newfane, New York)
- First Baptist Church in the City of New York, Manhattan
- First Baptist Church of Ossining
- First Baptist Church of Painted Post
- First Baptist Church of Phelps
- First Baptist Church (Poughkeepsie, New York)
- First Baptist Church (Sandy Creek, New York)
- First Baptist Church of Tarrytown
- First Baptist Church of Watkins Glen
- First Baptist Church of Weedsport

=== North Carolina ===
- First Baptist Church (Andrews, North Carolina)
- First Baptist Church (Asheville, North Carolina)
- First Baptist Church (Burlington, North Carolina)
- First Baptist Church–West (Charlotte, North Carolina)
- First Baptist Church (Durham, North Carolina)
- First Baptist Church (Eden, North Carolina)
- First Baptist Church (Fayetteville, North Carolina)
- First Baptist Church (High Point, North Carolina)
- First Baptist Church (Kernersville, North Carolina)
- First Baptist Church (Lincolnton, North Carolina)
- First Baptist Church (Madison, North Carolina)
- First Baptist Church (New Bern, North Carolina)
- First Baptist Church (Raleigh, North Carolina)
- First Baptist Church (Reidsville, North Carolina)
- First Baptist Church (Wilmington, North Carolina)

=== Ohio ===
- First Baptist Church (Vermilion, Ohio)
- First Baptist Church of Greater Cleveland

=== Oklahoma ===
- First Baptist Church (Colored)
- First Baptist Church (Muskogee, Oklahoma)

=== Oregon ===
- First Baptist Church (Ashland, Oregon)
- First Baptist Church of Brownsville
- First Baptist Church (Dayton, Oregon)

=== Pennsylvania ===
- First Baptist Church (Philadelphia), founded in 1698

=== Rhode Island ===
- First Baptist Church in America, a National Historic Landmark in Providence and the oldest Baptist church in the US

=== South Carolina ===
- First Baptist Church (Charleston, South Carolina)
- First Baptist Church (Columbia, South Carolina), a National Historic Landmark
- First Baptist Church (Darlington, South Carolina)

=== South Dakota ===
- First Baptist Church of Vermillion

=== Tennessee ===
- First Baptist Church (Chattanooga, Tennessee)
- First Baptist Church Education Building
- First Baptist Church, Lauderdale
- First Baptist Church East Nashville
- First Baptist Church (Knoxville, Tennessee)
- First Baptist Church (Memphis, Tennessee)
- First Baptist Church, Capitol Hill, Nashville

=== Texas ===
- First Baptist Church (Amarillo, Texas), listed on the NRHP in Potter County, Texas
- First Baptist Church (Dallas), a Southern Baptist megachurch
- First Baptist Church (Stamford, Texas)
- First Baptist Church (Sutherland Springs, Texas)

=== Vermont ===
- First Baptist Church (Burlington, Vermont)

=== Virginia ===
- First Baptist Church (Bristol, Virginia)
- First Baptist Church of Covington, Virginia
- First Baptist Church (Farmville, Virginia)
- First Baptist Church (Lexington, Virginia)
- First Baptist Church (Lynchburg, Virginia)
- First Baptist Church (Newport News, Virginia)
- First Baptist Church (Norfolk, Virginia)
- First Baptist Church (Petersburg, Virginia)
- First Baptist Church (Richmond, Virginia)
- First Baptist Church (Roanoke, Virginia), formerly, destroyed by fire in 1995
- First Baptist Church (Williamsburg, Virginia)

=== West Virginia ===
- First Baptist Church (Parkersburg, West Virginia)

=== Wisconsin ===
- First Baptist Church of Fond du Lac
- First Baptist Church (Osceola, Wisconsin)
- First Baptist Church (Waukesha, Wisconsin)

== See also ==
- Baptist Church
- FBC (disambiguation)
- Second Baptist Church (disambiguation)
- Third Baptist Church (disambiguation)
