= FBC =

FBC may refer to:

== Medicine ==
- Full blood count

== Broadcasting ==
- Fana Broadcasting Corporate, an Ethiopian broadcaster
- Fijian Broadcasting Corporation
  - FBC TV
- Finnish Broadcasting Company
- Fox Broadcasting Company, referred to on air as "Fox"
  - Fox Business Network, known before its launch as the Fox Business Channel
- Fukui Broadcasting, a Japanese television station

== Education ==
- Faith Baptist College, Rivers State, Nigeria
- Fellowship Baptist College, Negros Occidental, Philippines
- Fourah Bay College, Freetown, Sierra Leone

== Finance ==
- FBC Bank, Zimbabwean bank
- Flagstar Bank, American bank

== Religion ==
- First Baptist Church (disambiguation)
- Florida Baptist Convention

== Sport ==
- Fitzroy Baseball Club, Melbourne, Australia
- Football club
- Floorball club, for example FBC Ostrava
- Freedom Boat Club, American yacht club

== Legislation ==
- Florida Building Code
- Form-based code

== Technology ==
- Fluidized bed combustion
- Fragile base class
- "Faster, better, cheaper" approach (FBC), NASA's approach to spacecraft missions in the 1990s

== Business ==
- FBC Media, British public relations firm
- Frankfurter Büro Center, Frankfurt am Main, Germany
- Foster’s Bootcamp Club, Amsterdam based unique bootcamp experience, founded by Loek Foster

== Other ==
- Fare basis code, in the airline industry
- Fareham Borough Council, local government in Hampshire, England
- Full Blown Chaos, an American metalcore band
- Funnelbeaker culture, an archaeological culture in Europe
- Frost Bank Center, an American arena in San Antonio
