= First Baptist Church (Chattanooga, Tennessee) =

Historic church in Tennessee, United States

- Shiloh Baptist Church
- U.S. National Register of Historic Places
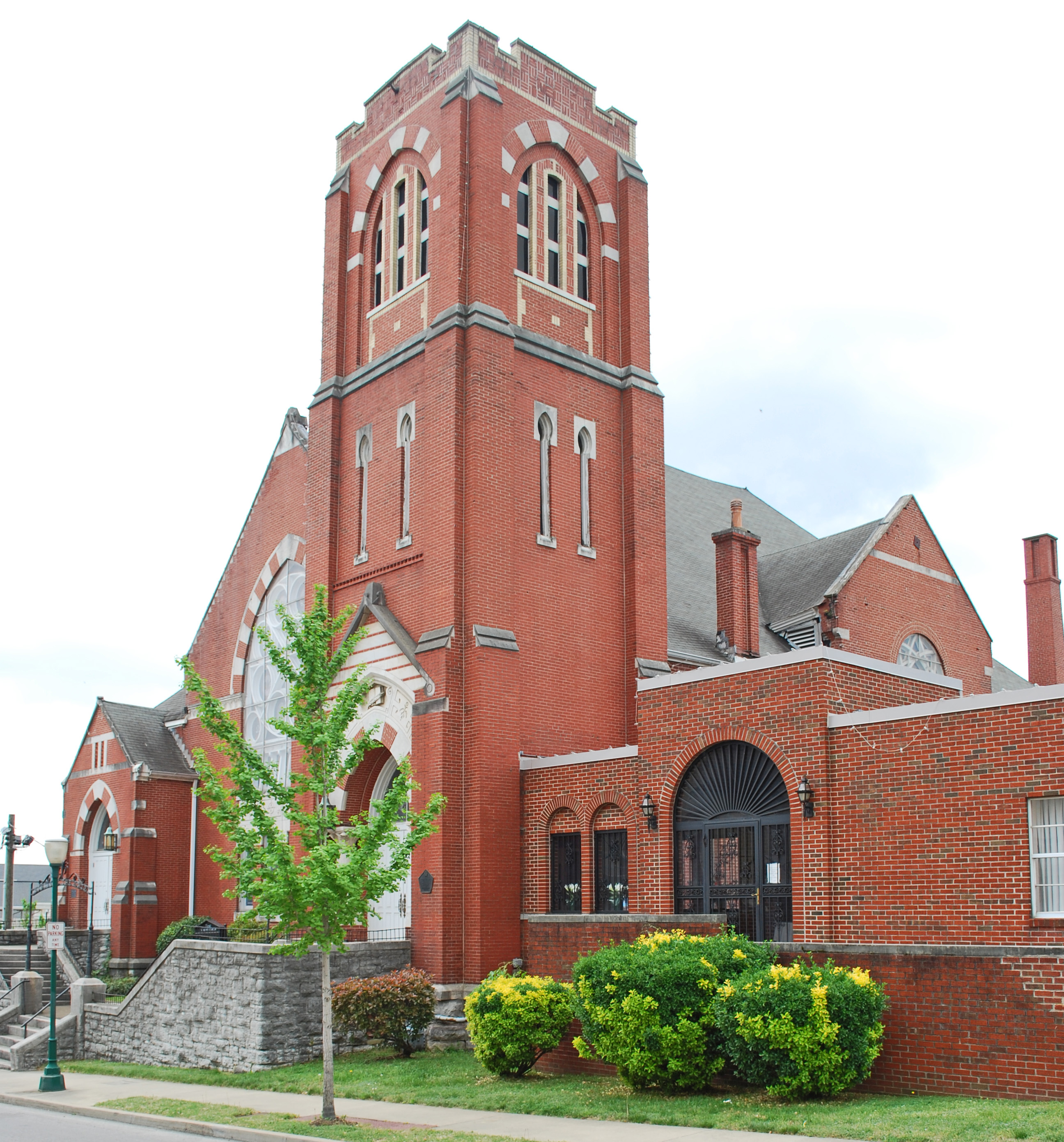

- Location within Tennessee Location within the United States
- Location: 506 E. 8th St., Chattanooga, Tennessee
- Coordinates: 35°2′43″N 85°18′11″W
- Area: 0.7 acres (0.28 ha)
- Built: 1885
- Architectural style: Gothic Revival
- NRHP reference No.: 79002442
- Added to NRHP: January 19, 1979

First Baptist Church East 8th Street, historically named Shiloh Baptist Church, is a historic church at 506 E. 8th Street in Chattanooga, Tennessee.

The congregation was organized in 1866 as Shiloh Baptist Church by a group of men who had served as soldiers in the Union Army during the Civil War. Initially they worshiped in a blacksmith shop; subsequently they met for worship in members' homes.

The church building was built in 1885 with the labor of former slaves. It was added to the National Register of Historic Places in 1979.
