= First Baptist Church (Fayetteville, North Carolina) =

Historic church in North Carolina, United States

- U.S. National Register of Historic Places
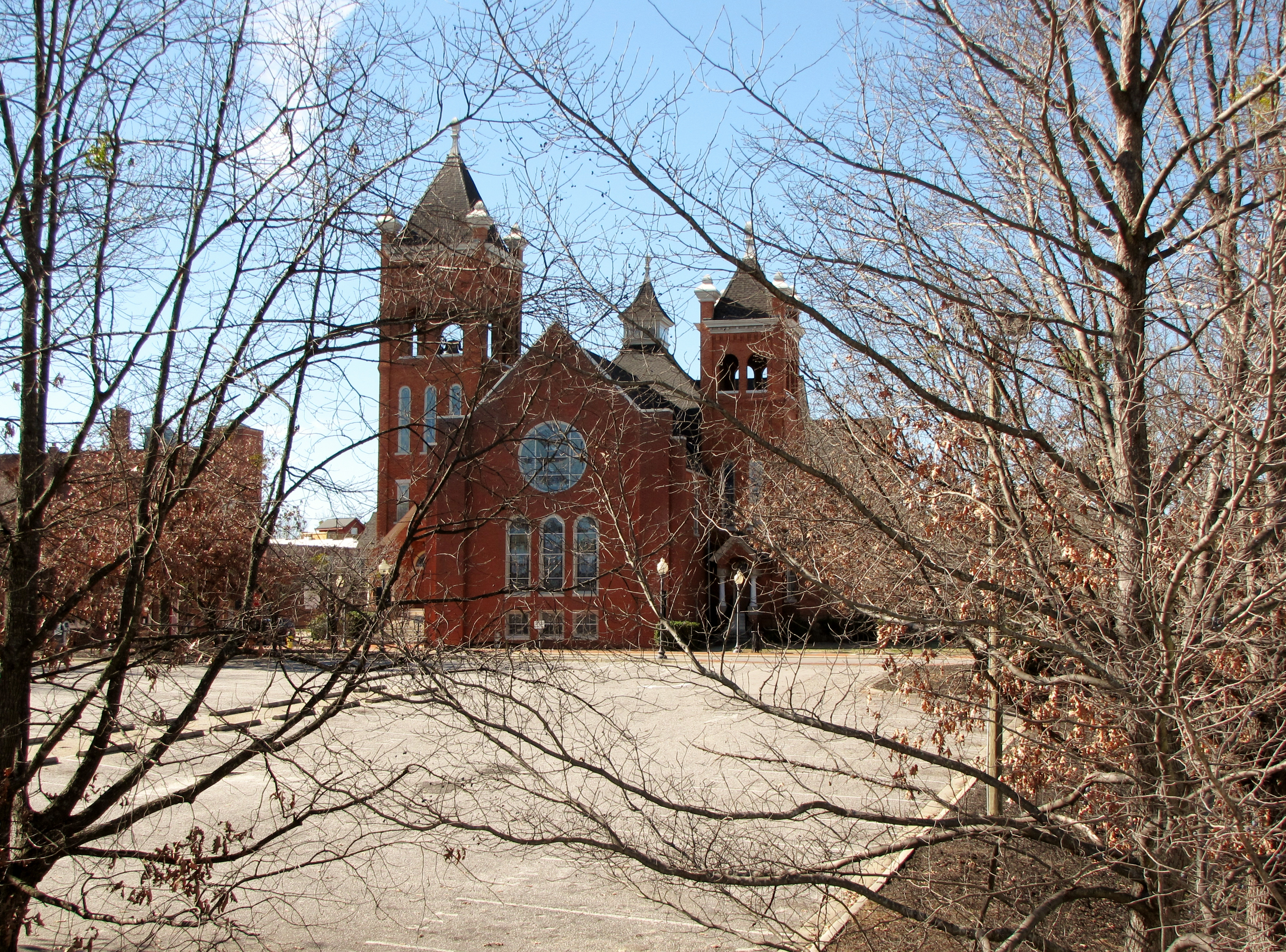
- First Baptist Church

- Location within North Carolina Location within the United States
- Location: 200 Old St., Fayetteville, North Carolina
- Coordinates: 35°3′14″N 78°52′47″W
- Area: less than one acre
- Built: 1906
- Architect: S.W. Foulk & Son
- Architectural style: Romanesque, Romanesque Revival
- MPS: Fayetteville MRA
- NRHP reference No.: 83001853
- Added to NRHP: July 7, 1983

First Baptist Church is a historic Baptist church located at 200 Old Street in Fayetteville, Cumberland County, North Carolina. It was built between 1906 and 1910, and is a Romanesque Revival-style brick church. It has a gable front flanked by towers of unequal size.

It was listed on the National Register of Historic Places in 1983.
