= First Baptist Church (Lansing, Michigan) =

Historic church in Michigan, United States

- U.S. National Register of Historic Places
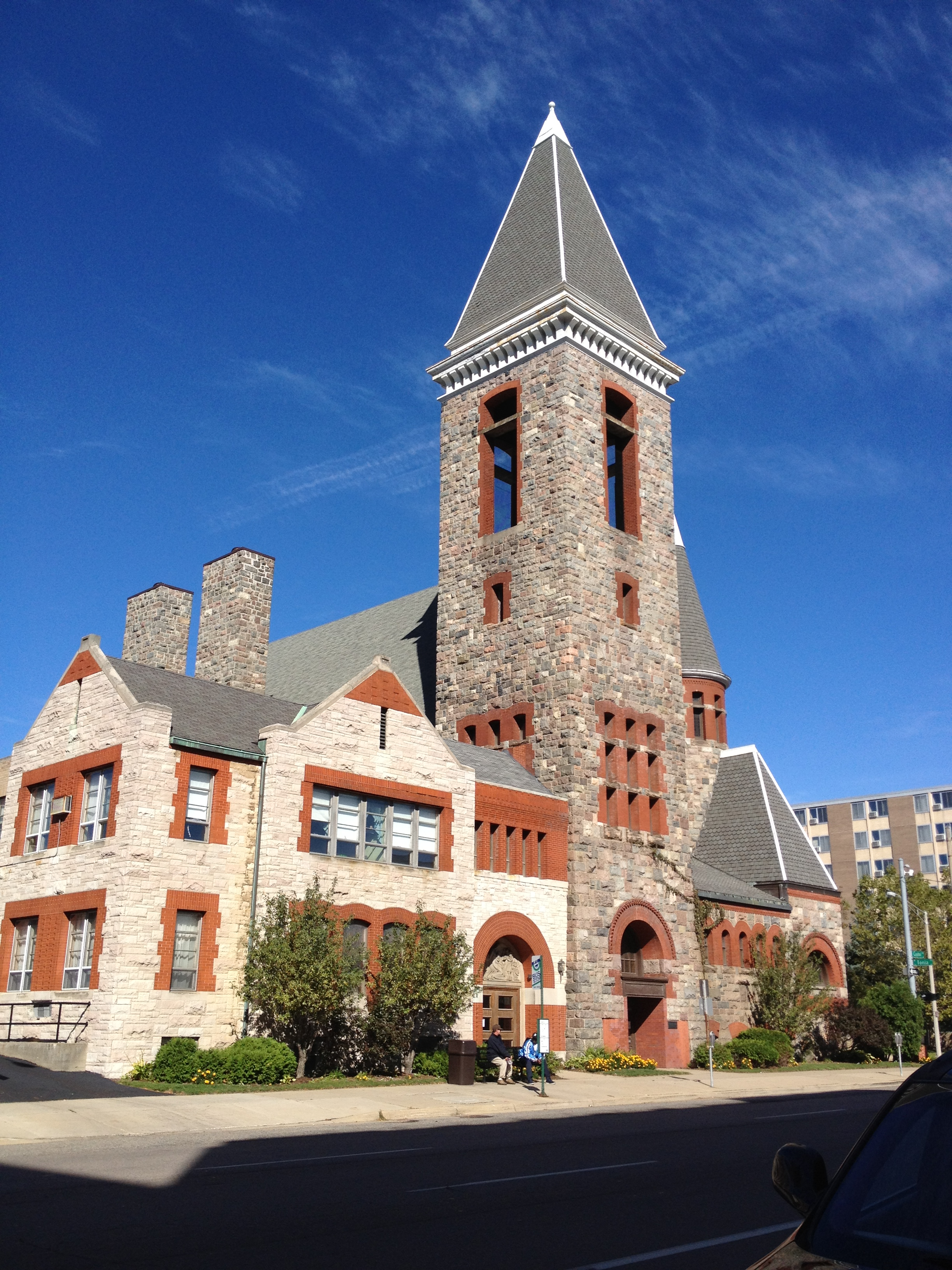

- Location within Michigan Location within the United States
- Interactive map
- Location: 227 N. Capitol Ave., Lansing, Michigan
- Coordinates: 42°44′8″N 84°33′16″W
- Area: less than one acre
- Built: 1892
- Architect: Bowd & Mead
- Architectural style: Romanesque, Richardson Romanesque
- MPS: Downtown Lansing MRA
- NRHP reference No.: 80001866
- Added to NRHP: September 17, 1980

First Baptist Church is a historic church at 227 N. Capitol Avenue in Lansing, Michigan. It was added to the National Register of Historic Places in 1980. The congregation is now known as Christ Community Church of Greater Lansing.

== History ==
Lansing's First Baptist Church was organized in 1851. The congregation constructed a frame church in 1857. By the late 1880s, the congregation was rapidly expanding, and a new structure was needed. In 1892, construction began on the present structure, located at the site of the original church. The architects for the project were Edwyn A. Bawd and Earl H. Mead. Construction was completed in 1894.

Over the next decades, the church established nine different congregations in the Lansing area. However, like many mainline congregations in downtown areas, the First Baptist Church began a decline in membership starting in the mid 1960s. In 2005, the congregation changed its name to Christ Community Church, and continues to use the structure.

== Description ==
The First Baptist Church consists of the 1892 church and an attached parish house, which was rehabilitated in 1955. The church is a steep-roof, Richardson Romanesque structure constructed of multi-colored local stone. The building has brick facings which line window and door openings. The front facade has a square tower at one corner, a smaller round tower at the other, and a low entry vestibule between.

On the interior is an entry vestibule with oak wainscoting and a tin ceiling. Double doors open onto the sanctuary, which has a high ceiling with timber trusses and a rear gallery supported by iron columns with Corinthian capitals. The sanctuary contains three tiers of pews on a floor that slopes downward toward a chancel. All the sanctuary woodwork is of oak.
