= First Baptist Church (Vermilion, Ohio) =

Historic church in Ohio, United States

- U.S. National Register of Historic Places
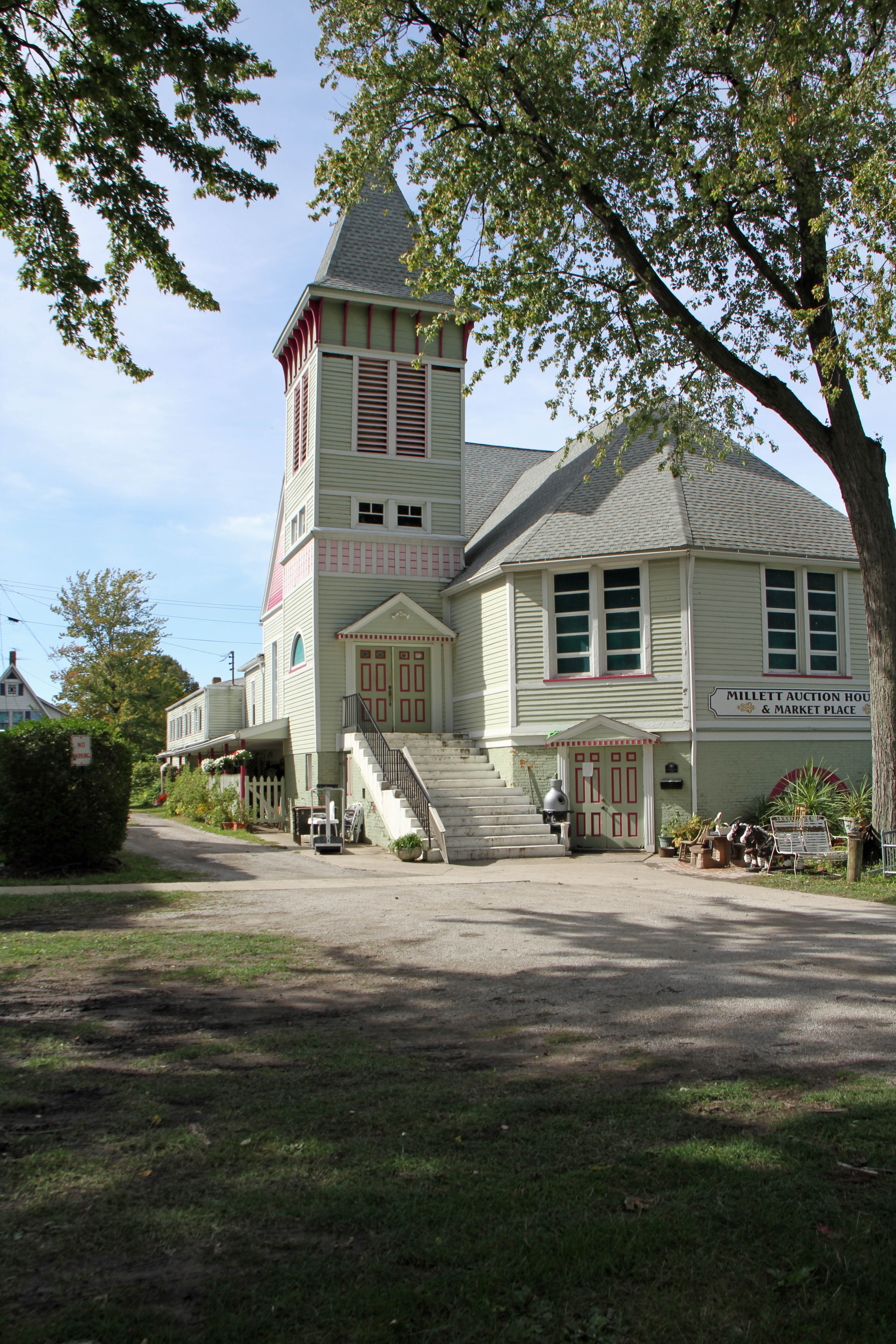

- Location within Ohio Location within the United States
- Location: 728 Main St., Vermilion, Ohio
- Coordinates: 41°25′13″N 82°21′56″W
- Area: less than one acre
- Built: 1888
- Architectural style: Gothic
- MPS: Vermilion-Harbour Town MRA
- NRHP reference No.: 79003954
- Added to NRHP: November 14, 1979

First Baptist Church is a historic Baptist church at 728 Main Street in Vermilion, Ohio.

It was built in 1888 and added to the National Register of Historic Places in 1979.
