= First Baptist Church of Fond du Lac =

Historic church in Wisconsin, United States

- U.S. National Register of Historic Places
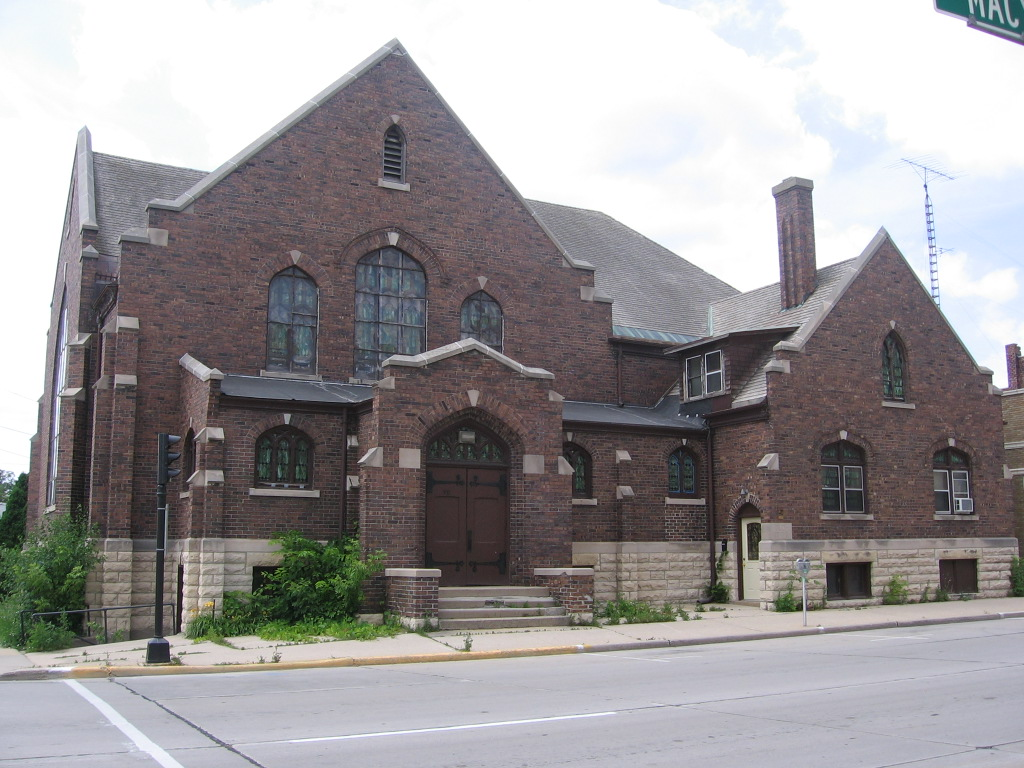
- First Baptist Church of Fond du Lac
- Location: 90 S. Macy St. Fond du Lac, Wisconsin
- Coordinates: 43.77635°N 88.44839°W
- Built: 1907; 119 years ago
- Architectural style: Gothic Revival
- NRHP reference No.: 86003522
- Added to NRHP: December 29, 1986

The First Baptist Church of Fond du Lac is a church located in Fond du Lac, Wisconsin. It was added to the National Register of Historic Places in 1986 for its architectural significance.
