= First Baptist Church of Boulder =

Historic church in Boulder, Colorado

- U.S. National Register of Historic Places
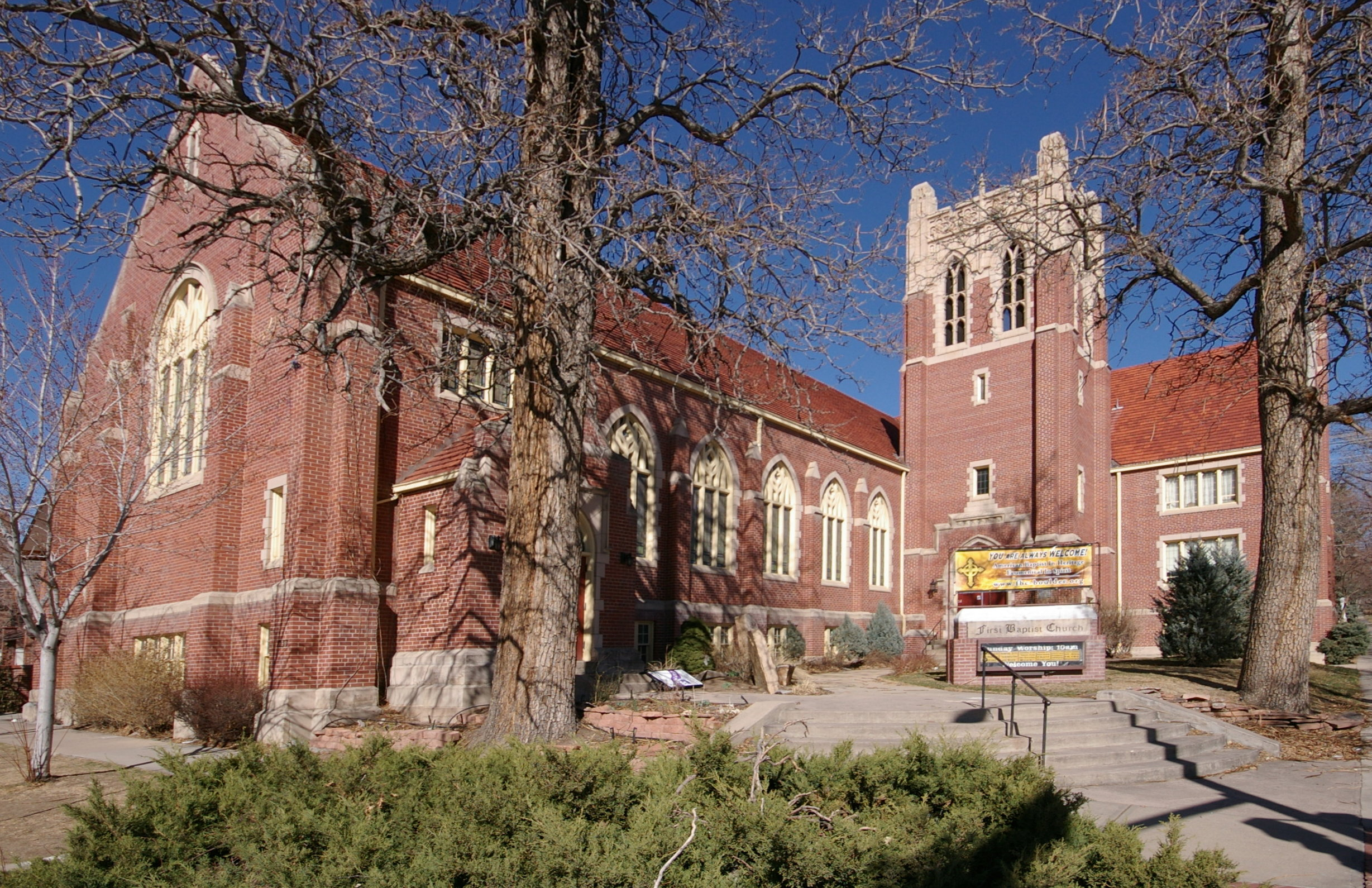
- Church in 2009

- Location within Colorado
- Location: 1237 Pine St., Boulder, Colorado
- Coordinates: 40°01′13″N 105°16′45″W
- Area: less than one acre
- Built: 1925-26
- Architect: Martin, Orr and Martin
- Architectural style: Late Gothic Revival
- NRHP reference No.: 04000275
- Added to NRHP: April 14, 2004

The First Baptist Church of Boulder, at 1237 Pine St. in Boulder, Colorado, was built in 1925-26. It was listed on the National Register of Historic Places in 2004. It is a brick L-shaped building "central three-story square tower is located at the inside corner of the "L" and has the pointed arch main entrance with heavy, paneled, glazed, wooden, double doors. The tower is topped with a pre-cast concrete belfry with such ornate details as a crenellated parapet, quatrefoils, corner piers, and large lancet openings with smaller lancet shapes in the tracery."

It was deemed significant as "excellent example of the Late Gothic Revival style. Exhibiting all of the elements of this early 20th century style in its square tower, decorative quatrefoils, pointed-arch windows and doors, and buttresses,
