= First Baptist Church of Deerfield =

Historic church in New York, United States

- U.S. National Register of Historic Places
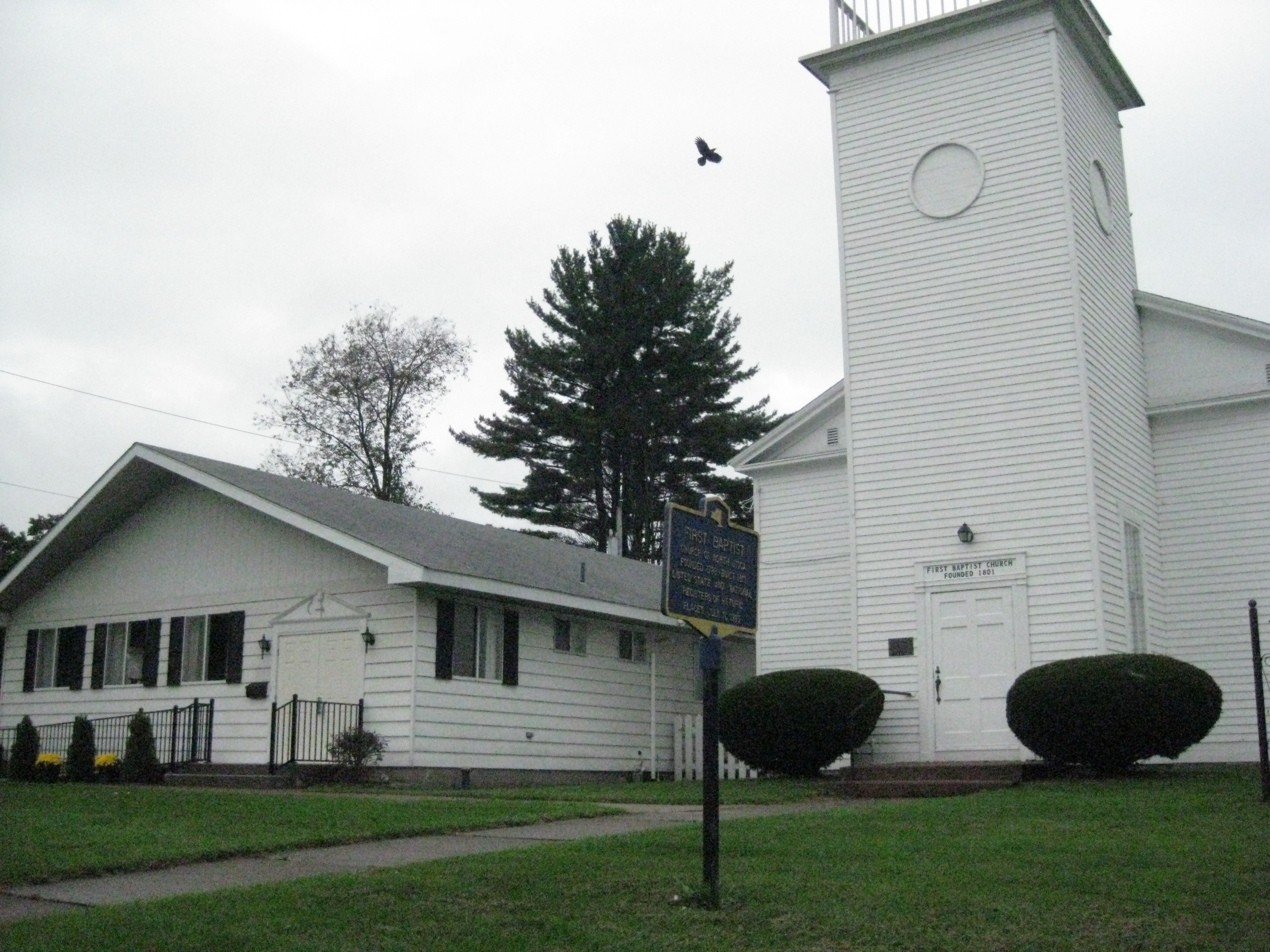
- First Baptist Church of Deerfield, September 2012

- Location within New York Location within the United States
- Location: Herkimer Rd., Utica, New York
- Coordinates: 43°6′51″N 75°12′8″W
- Area: 1 acre (0.40 ha)
- Built: 1811
- Architectural style: Federal, Vernacular Federal
- NRHP reference No.: 85001497
- Added to NRHP: July 11, 1985

First Baptist Church of Deerfield is a historic Baptist church on Herkimer Road in Utica, Oneida County, New York. It is a wooden frame structure built in 1811 with vernacular Federal style details. The structure is four bays deep and features a square entrance tower attached to the facade.

It was listed on the National Register of Historic Places in 1985.
