= First Baptist Church of Wollaston =

Historic church in Massachusetts, United States

- U.S. National Register of Historic Places
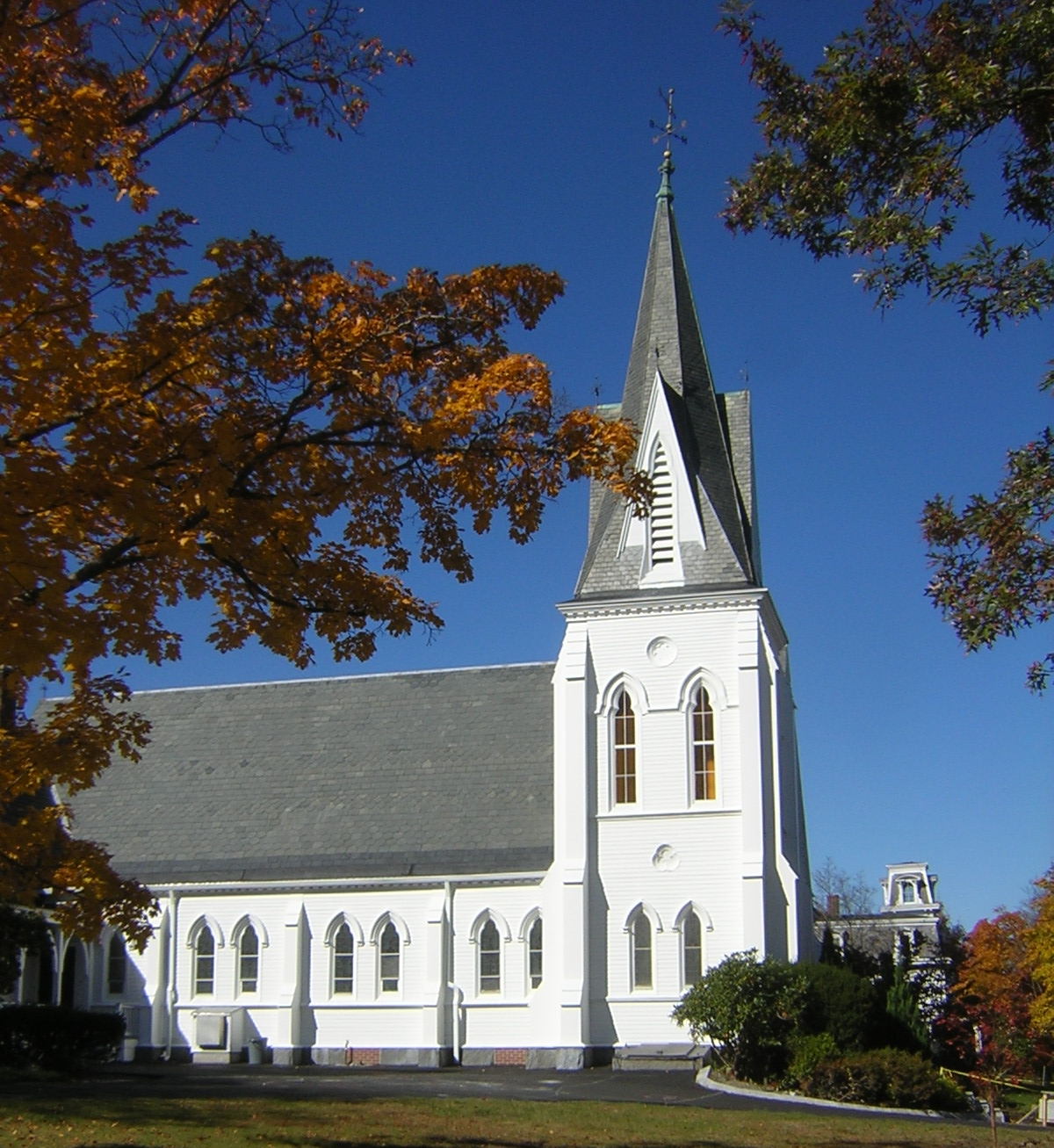

- Location within Massachusetts Location within the United States
- Location: 187 Warren Ave., Wollaston, Massachusetts
- Coordinates: 42°15′38″N 71°1′13″W
- Area: less than one acre
- Built: 1873
- Architectural style: Gothic Revival
- MPS: Quincy MRA
- NRHP reference No.: 89001380
- Added to NRHP: September 20, 1989

First Baptist Church of Wollaston is a historic Baptist church building in Wollaston, Massachusetts. Built in 1873 for a new congregation, and repeatedly enlarged, it is a fine example of Gothic Revival architecture, and one of the city's finest remaining wood-frame churches. The church was listed on the National Register of Historic Places in 1989.

== Architecture and history ==
The First Baptist Church of Wollaston is set on a large lot at the western corner of Prospect and Warren Avenues in Quincy's Wollaston. It is now a large asymmetrical T-shaped structure whose long side extends along Prospect, with the original 1873 church building projecting toward that street. That structure has a steeply pitched slate gable roof, with a tower set at the near left corner. The square tower has buttressing at the corners and narrow paired lancet windows on its lower two levels, and is topped by a pyramidal spire. Extending left from the rear of this structure is a 1913 addition, designed by Boston architect Albert Hayden Wright, that adopts similar design elements, and incorporates an 1890 chapel, connecting the two buildings via a Gothic colonnade. A second addition, dating to 1956, extends to the right.

Development of the Wollaston Heights area began in 1870, and this church was one of the first major structures built in the area. It was built on land donated by the Wollaston Land Company, the area's developer. George Pinkham, one of the church congregation's founders, was the business manager of the company. The congregation was organized in 1871.

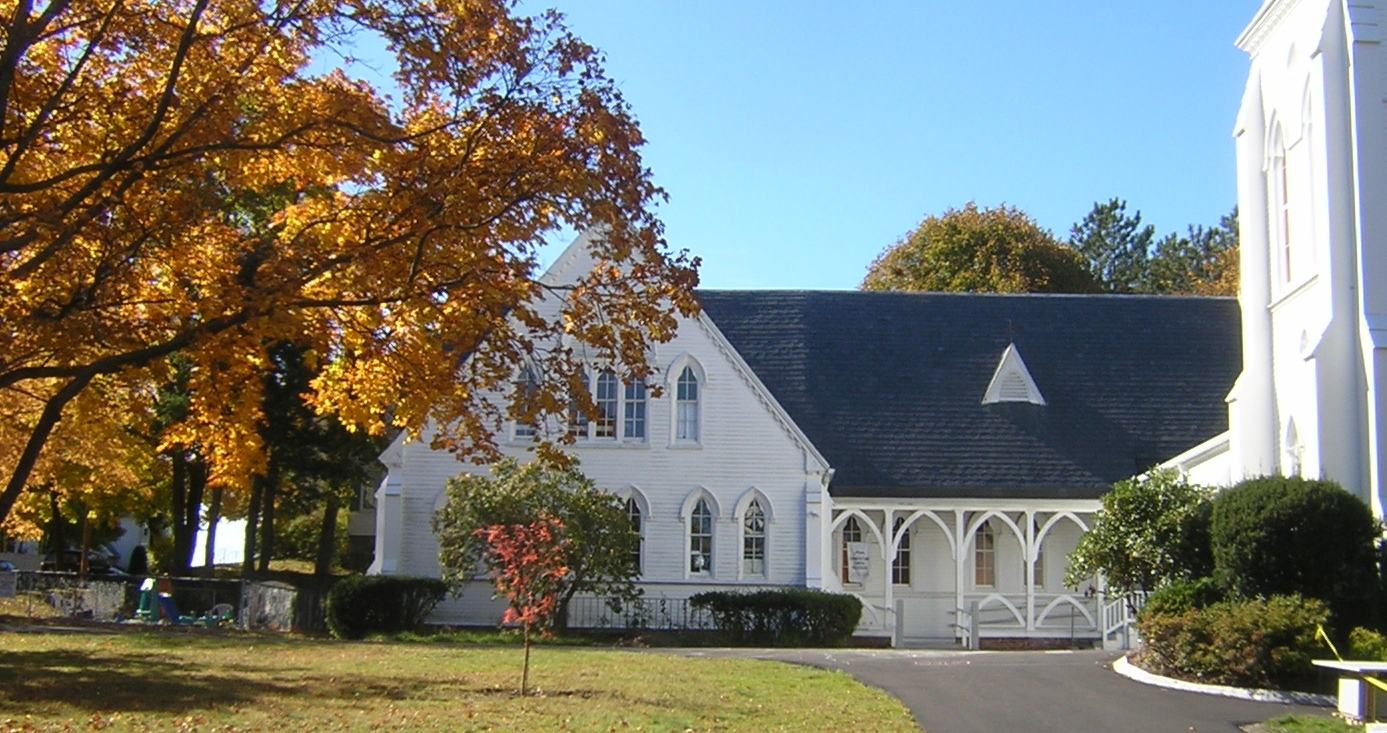

== See also ==
- National Register of Historic Places listings in Quincy, Massachusetts
