= First Baptist Church (Alamosa, Colorado) =

Historic church in Colorado, United States

- U.S. National Register of Historic Places
- Colorado State Register of Historic Properties
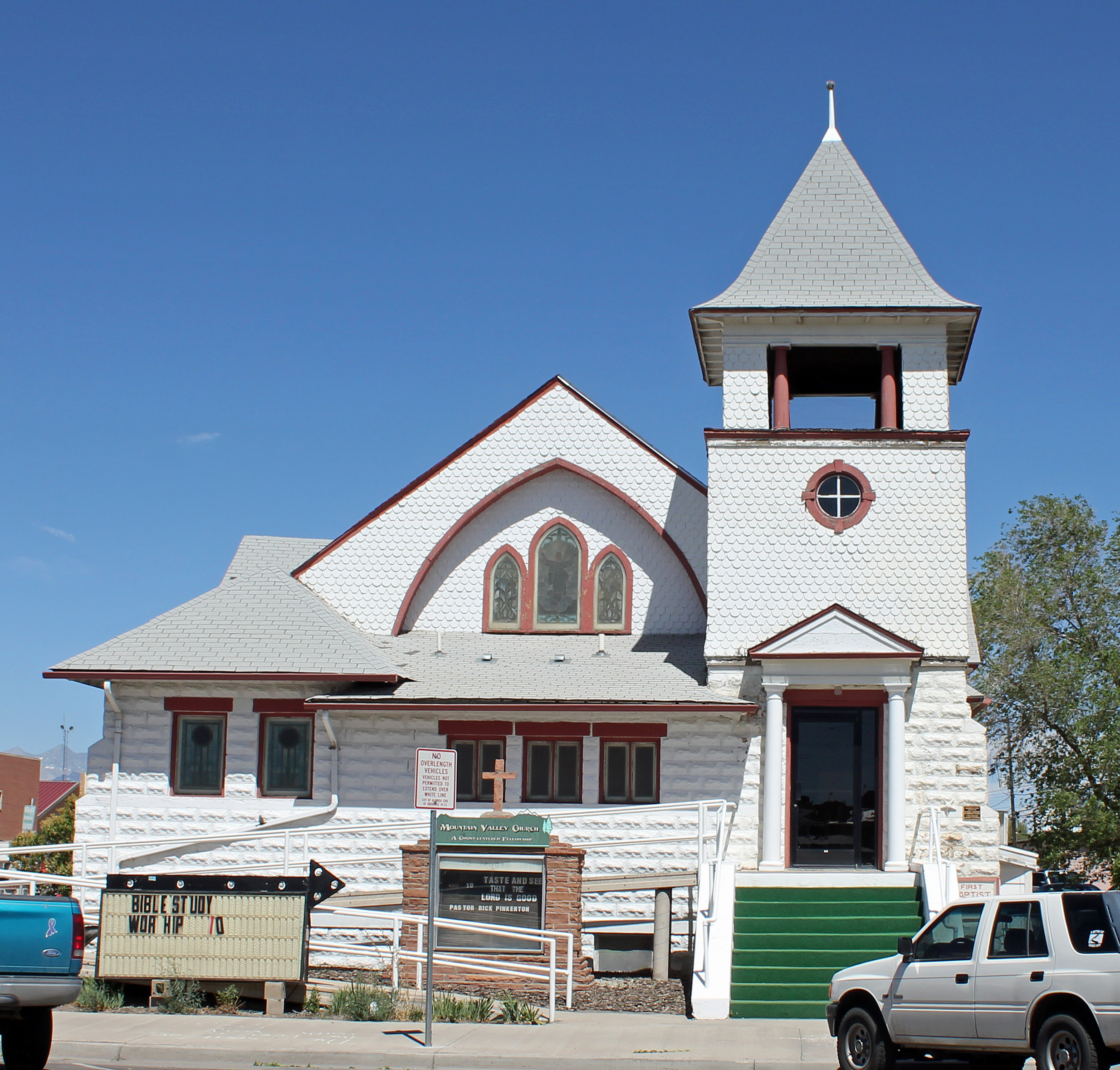

- Location within Colorado Location within the United States
- Location: 408 State Ave., Alamosa, Colorado
- Coordinates: 37°28′08″N 105°51′53″W
- Area: less than one acre
- Built: 1907
- MPS: Ornamental Concrete Block Buildings in Colorado MPS
- NRHP reference No.: 05000425
- CSRHP No.: 5AL.259
- Added to NRHP: May 22, 2005

First Baptist Church (also known as Mountain Valley Church) is a historic church at 408 State Avenue in Alamosa, Colorado. It was built in 1907 and was added to the National Register of Historic Places in 2005.

Its exterior is concrete blocks, painted. The blocks are approximately 18 by 8 inches (0.46 m × 0.20 m) and are laid in running bond. The church has a complex roofline, although the basic form of the church is rectangular.

The building is now the home to the "Pentecostal Church of God International Movement of the Rocky Mountains".
