= First Baptist Church (Geneva, New York) =

Historic church in New York, United States

- U.S. National Register of Historic Places
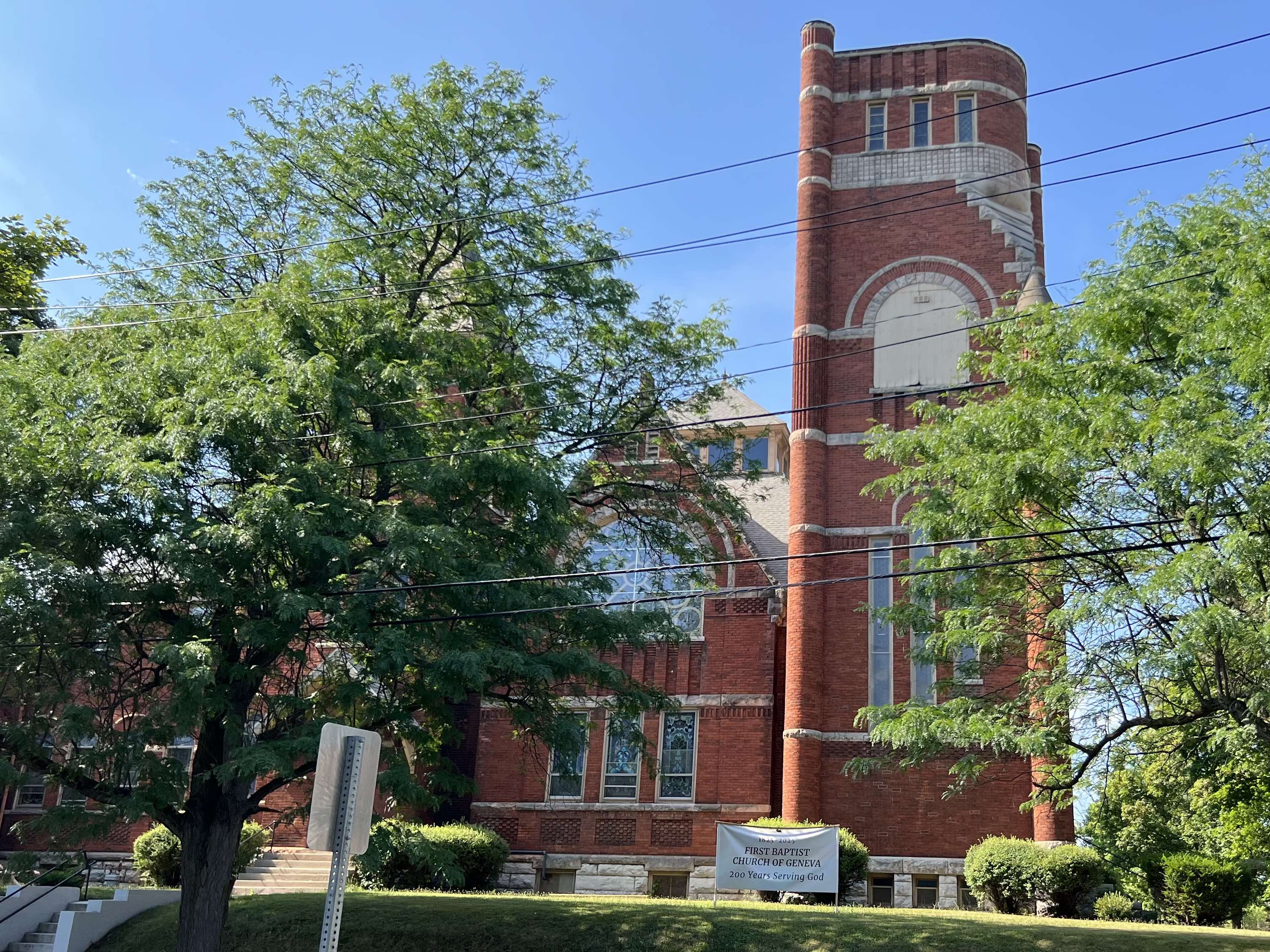

- Location within New York Location within the United States
- Location: 134 N. Main St., Geneva, New York
- Coordinates: 42°52′16″N 76°59′15″W
- Area: less than one acre
- Built: 1893-1894
- Architect: Hubbard, H.M.
- Architectural style: Romanesque
- NRHP reference No.: 02001118
- Added to NRHP: October 10, 2002

First Baptist Church is a historic Baptist church located at Geneva in Ontario County, New York. The church was constructed in 1893-1894 and is an example of Romanesque Revival style. Constructed of brick with limestone accents, the main block is surmounted by a profusion of tower, turrets, and cross gables. The front facade is flanked by two massive square towers.

It was listed on the National Register of Historic Places in 2002.
