= First Baptist Church of Santa Ana =

Historic Orange County, California, church

Coordinates: 33.7508°N 117.8678°W

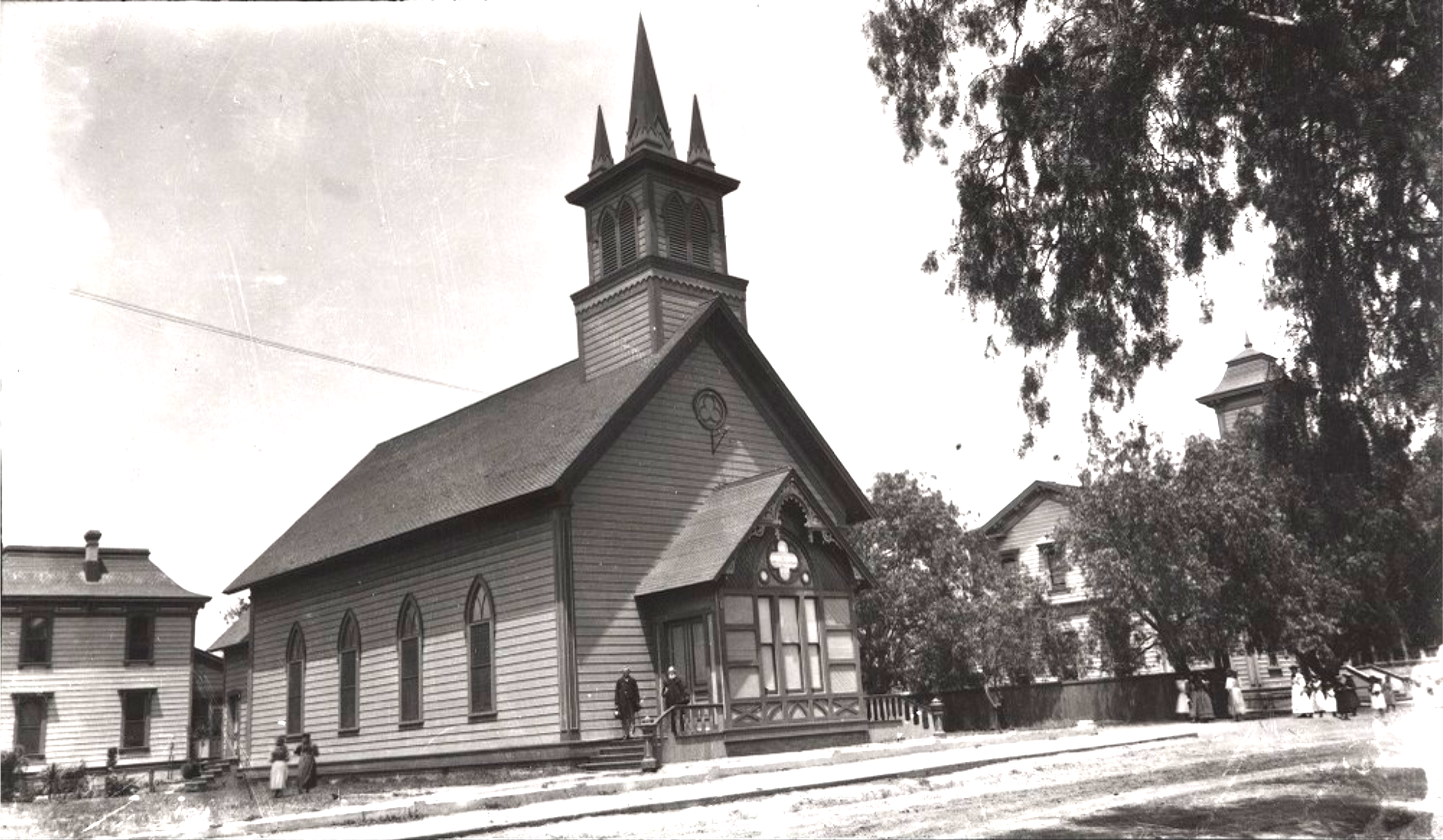
- Original building
- First Baptist Church of Santa Ana
- Location: Santa Ana, California
- Country: United States
- Denomination: Baptist

History
- Founded: 1871

Architecture
- Closed: 2019

The First Baptist Church of Santa Ana (1871–2019) was one of Orange County's pioneer Christian churches, believed to be the fifth Baptist church established in California.

== History ==
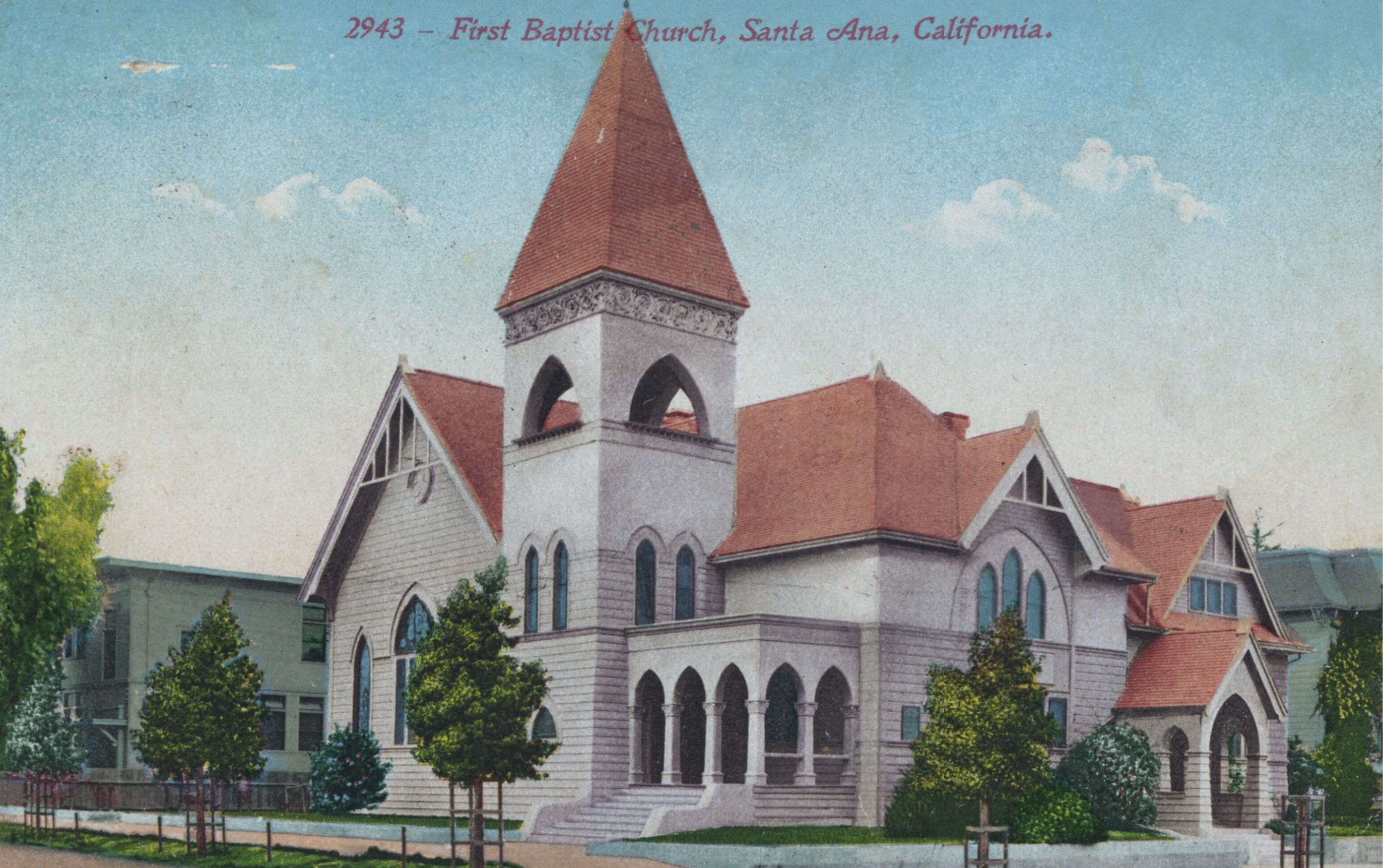
First Baptist Church of Santa Ana in 1911

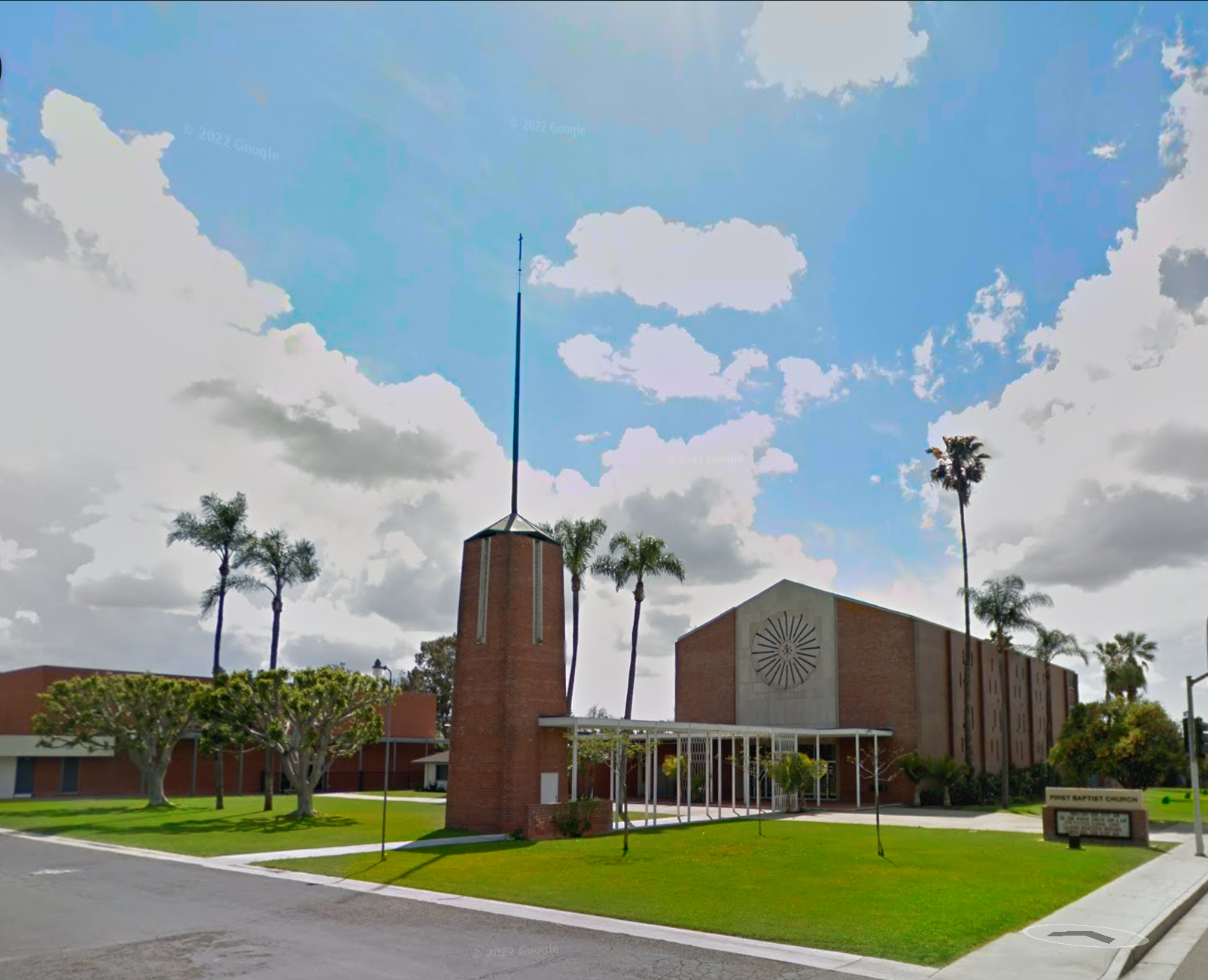
First Baptist Church of Santa Ana at its next location, 1011 Seventeenth Street

First Baptist was one of the earliest Protestant churches founded in Orange County, California.

Although Anaheim, Orange County's Mother Colony, was founded in 1857, the city did not establish a church until a decade later. At the time, no German-speaking Lutheran minister was available in the 1860s and 1870s. Other Anaheim pioneers had fallen out of the habit of church attendance after the German Revolution of 1848 or their journey to California, facing a scarcity of available ministers of any denomination.

Conversely, the city of Santa Ana, founded in 1869, began constructing churches immediately after its establishment. Post-Civil War American migrants to Southern California considered the construction of churches necessary for a settlement's success. By 1879, the settlement was home to at least nine Christian congregations. Santa Ana's first church, the Methodist Episcopal Church South, later called the Spurgeon Memorial Methodist Church, originally began meeting in the home of Mr. and Mrs. W.H. Titchenal in December 1870. Eventually, Methodist Episcopal Church South, First Baptist, and two other denominations founded in the 1870s shared a local school building at West and Church streets, alternating Sunday services.

The Southern Methodists were quickly followed by the Baptists, whose church was founded only four months later, in March 1871. Thirteen members, led by Reverend Richard C. Fryer of Pomona, laid the roots of this congregation and its mission. In 1873, Reverend Isaac Hickey, known for his fiery sermons in Gospel Swamp, became the first Baptist minister to live within Santa Ana.

Three years later, the First Baptist Church built its first church on the northwest corner of Church and Main Streets on four lots donated by William H. Spurgeon. At the price of $4,000, the church interior was left unfinished for many years as members mortgaged their homes to pay the cost. Yet, as Santa Ana developed, so did the church. In 1901 and 1913, the church was renovated and enlarged.

== Significance and legacy ==
First Baptist Church operated as a beacon of outreach and acceptance in Orange County for over a century. Many of the region's pioneers, including those of Santa Ana, Westminster, Garden Grove, and Orange, were Confederate Veterans and even affiliated with the Reconstruction-era Ku Klux Klan. Santa Ana's first church, the Methodist Episcopal Church South, was a branch of the pro-slavery wing of the Methodist denomination, which had split over the issue of slavery in 1844.

In contrast, First Baptist Church was founded as an abolitionist institution, building a lasting and living legacy in Orange County and offering hope in times of despair. By 1923, members of First Baptist Church worked with members of Santa Ana's Black community to found the Second Baptist Church of Santa Ana, Orange County's oldest Black Church. Church historian Milana Oyunga described:

"They helped them get started with the down payment of $150, a Bible, and the first pew, which we still have on our premises. ... With that initial help they had given us, they have been a friend and support to us all these years, that culminated to today."

During the Jim Crow era, First and Second Baptist often collaborated, fundraised together, and welcomed each other's congregations. Standing with Black Orange Countians throughout the strife of the Civil Rights Movement, First Baptist reached out to and cared for its neighbors.

Despite church membership waning in its later years, First Baptist found a home in the home it helped found for others, spending its last three years of operation worshiping at Second Baptist. After 148 years of serving the community, First Baptist ceased operations in 2019. Upon closing, the final congregation left an endowment to Second Baptist to be used for maintaining First Baptist's memory and continuing its mission through community outreach in First Baptist's name.
