= First Baptist Church (Bay Minette, Alabama) =

Historic church in Alabama, United States

- Original Location Of The First Baptist Church
- U.S. National Register of Historic Places
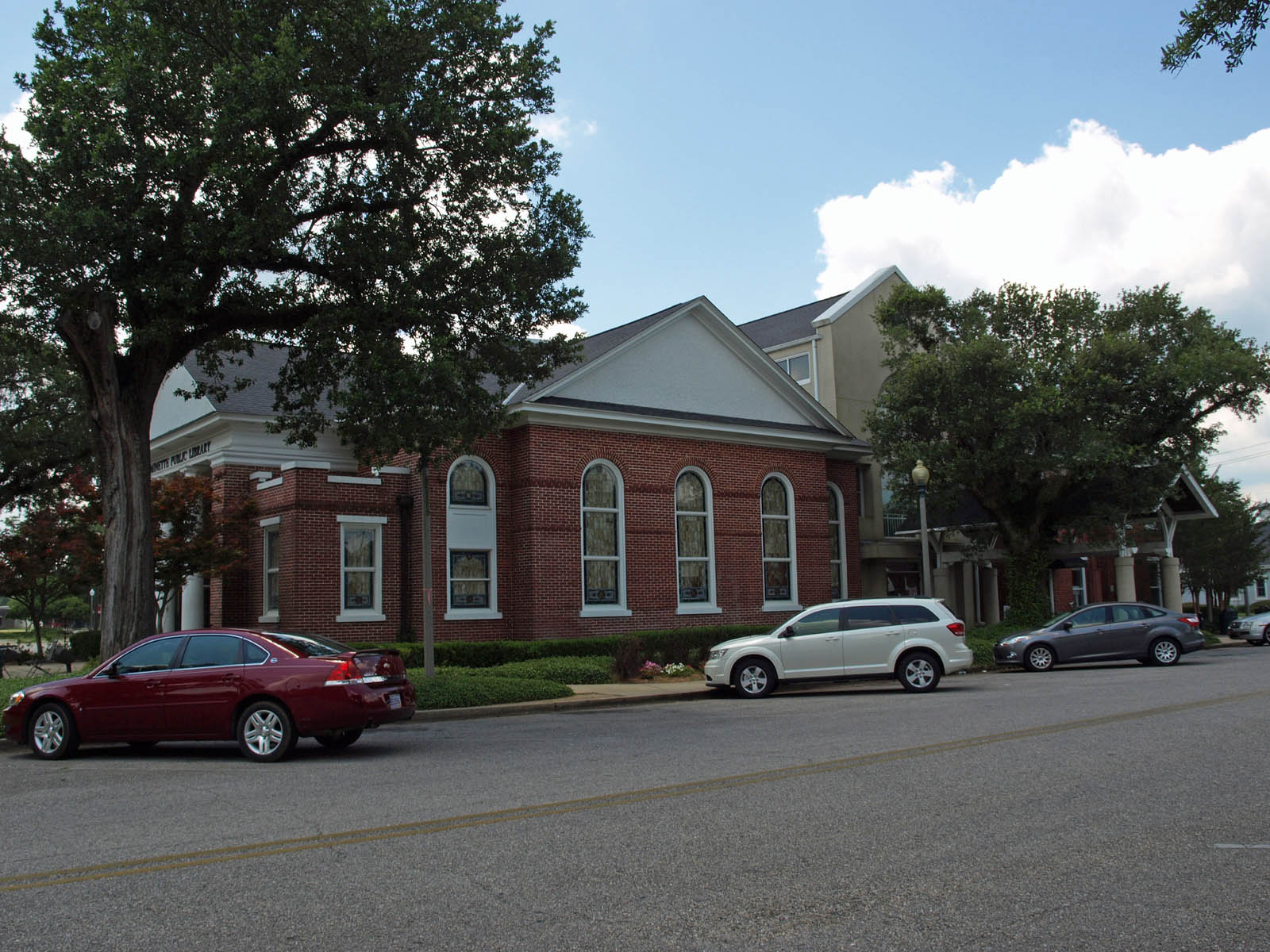
- The building in June 2013

- Location within Alabama Location within the United States
- Location: N side D'Olive St., Bay Minette, Alabama
- Coordinates: 30°53′5″N 87°46′36″W
- Area: 0.6 acres (0.24 ha)
- Built: 1914
- MPS: Rural Churches of Baldwin County TR
- NRHP reference No.: 88001349
- Added to NRHP: August 25, 1988

First Baptist Church is a historic Southern Baptist church on D'Olive Street in Bay Minette, Alabama, United States. It was built in 1914 and added to the National Register of Historic Places in 1988. The Bay Minette Public Library currently occupies the building.
