= First Baptist Church (East Thomas, Alabama) =

Historic church in Alabama, United States

- First Baptist Church, East Thomas
- U.S. National Register of Historic Places
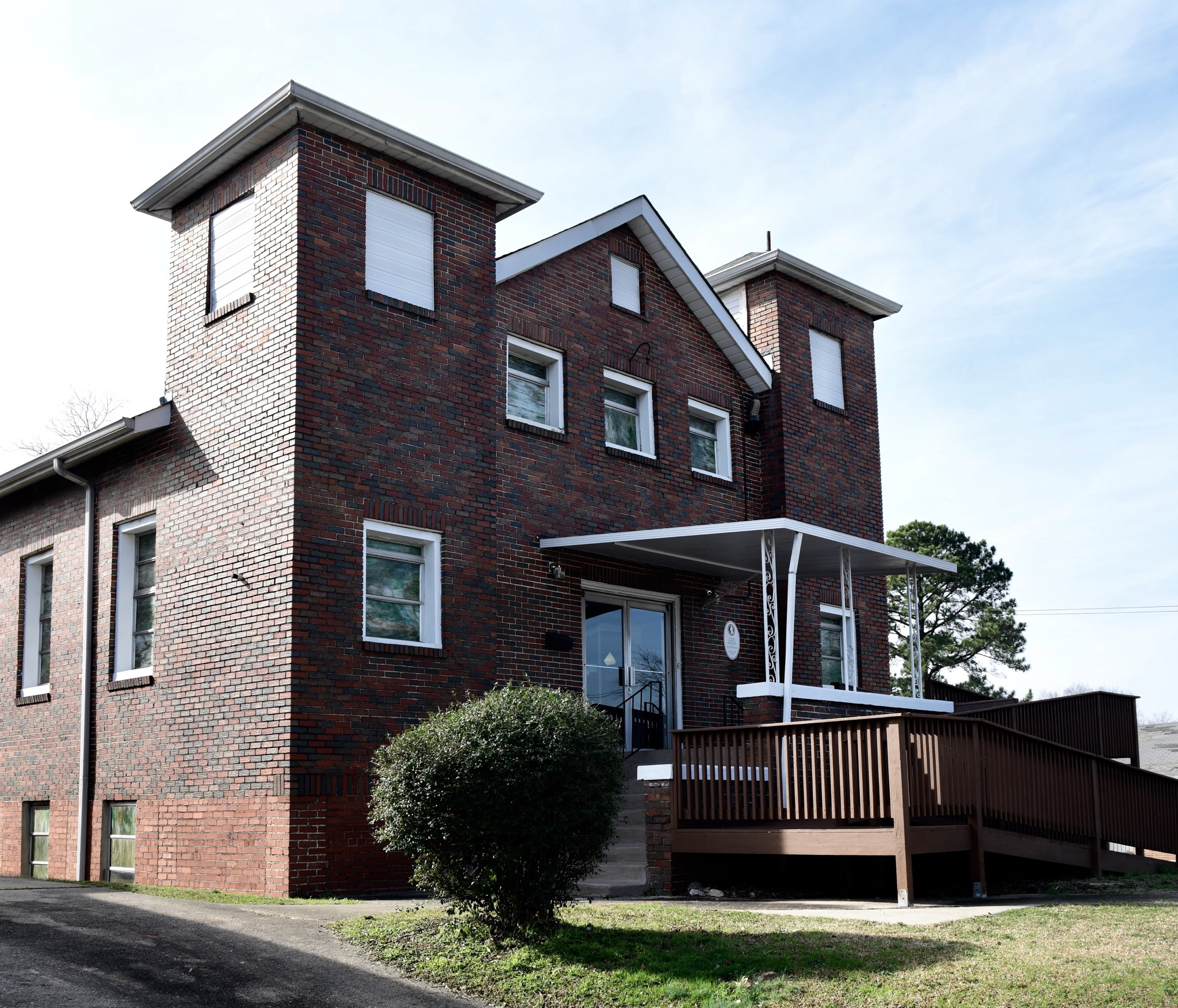

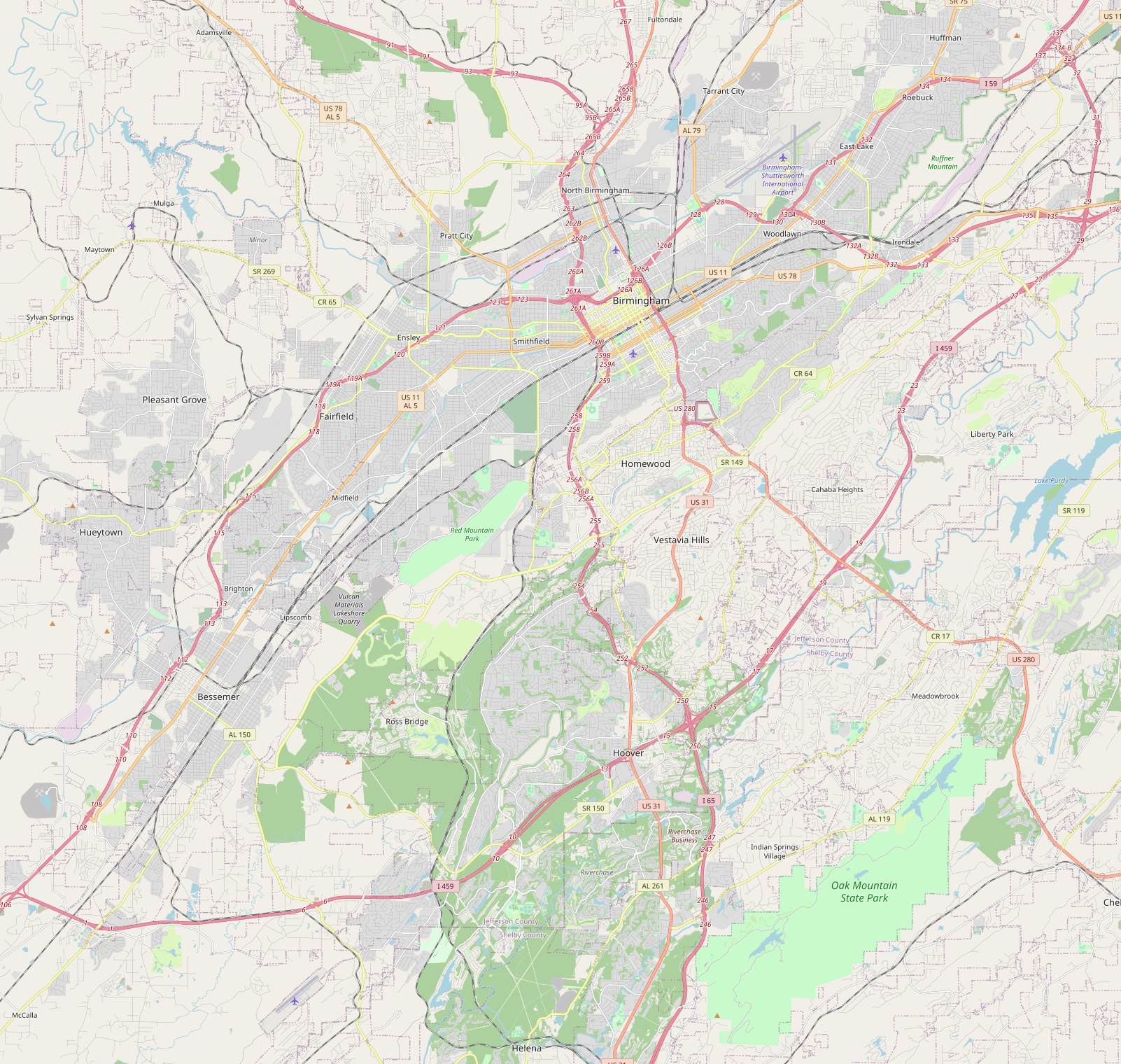
- Location within Birmingham, Alabama Location within Alabama Location within the United States
- Location: 419 11th Court West; Birmingham, Alabama
- Coordinates: 33°31′20″N 86°50′36″W
- Area: less than one acre
- Built: 1939
- Built by: James Prowell
- Architectural style: Gothic Revival
- MPS: Civil Rights Movement in Birmingham, Alabama MPS
- NRHP reference No.: 05000291
- Added to NRHP: April 19, 2005

First Baptist Church, East Thomas is a historic church at 419 11th Court West in Birmingham, Alabama. It was built in 1939 in a Gothic Revival style and was added to the National Register of Historic Places in 2005.
