= First Baptist Church (Hardin, Montana) =

- U.S. National Register of Historic Places
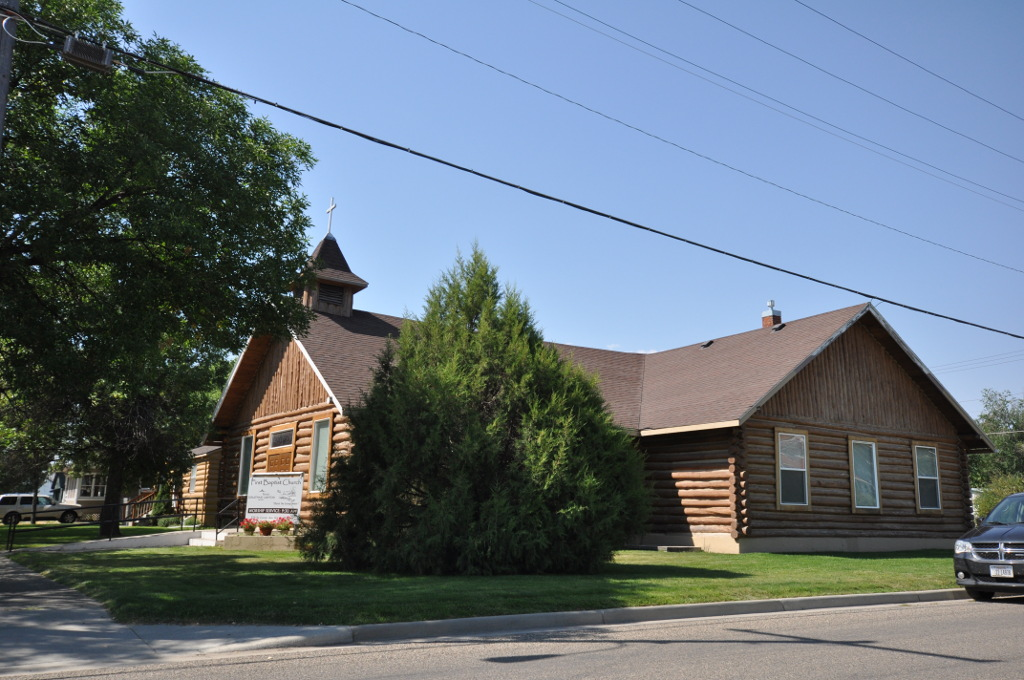

- Location within Montana Location within the United States
- Location: 524 N. Custer Ave., Hardin, Montana
- Coordinates: 45°44′03″N 107°36′26″W
- Area: less than one acre
- Built: 1931
- Architect: Morissette, Edelbert
- Architectural style: Craftsman, Rustic
- MPS: Hardin MPS
- NRHP reference No.: 91000369
- Added to NRHP: April 11, 1991

The First Baptist Church in Hardin, Montana, at 524 N. Custer Ave., was built in 1931. It was listed on the National Register of Historic Places in 1991.

It is a one-story Craftsman style log building.

It was designed by Edelbert Morisette, a French-Canadian, who could communicate the plan only via a model.
