= First Baptist Church (Panama City, Florida) =

Coordinates: 30.16025°N 85.66085°W

First Baptist Church is a Baptist megachurch located in Panama City, Florida. It is affiliated with the Southern Baptist Convention.

== History ==
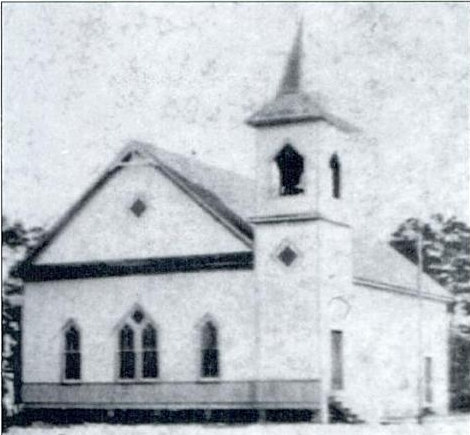
The first sanctuary of First Baptist Church in Panama City

Before First Baptist Church of Panama City was built, early residents of Panama City worshiped in a one-room schoolhouse with other denominations. First Baptist Church was started in 1908, and the first pastor was F. H. Poston.

W. A. Burns moved the church from its first location to a more stately location during his tenure as senior pastor from 1926 until 1929.

E. D. McDaniel began to record the history of the church during his tenure as pastor trom July 1931 until May 1949.

=== Building and facility ===
The original church building was still being used as of 2008. Over the years First Baptist Church also bought several properties and buildings to accommodate their ministries and mission. They constructed an educational building in the 1950s and utilized many different sanctuaries over the years. The Church purchased the town's old National Guard Armory to renovate it into the Family Life Building.
