= First Baptist Church (Madison, Florida) =

Historic church in Florida, United States

- U.S. National Register of Historic Places
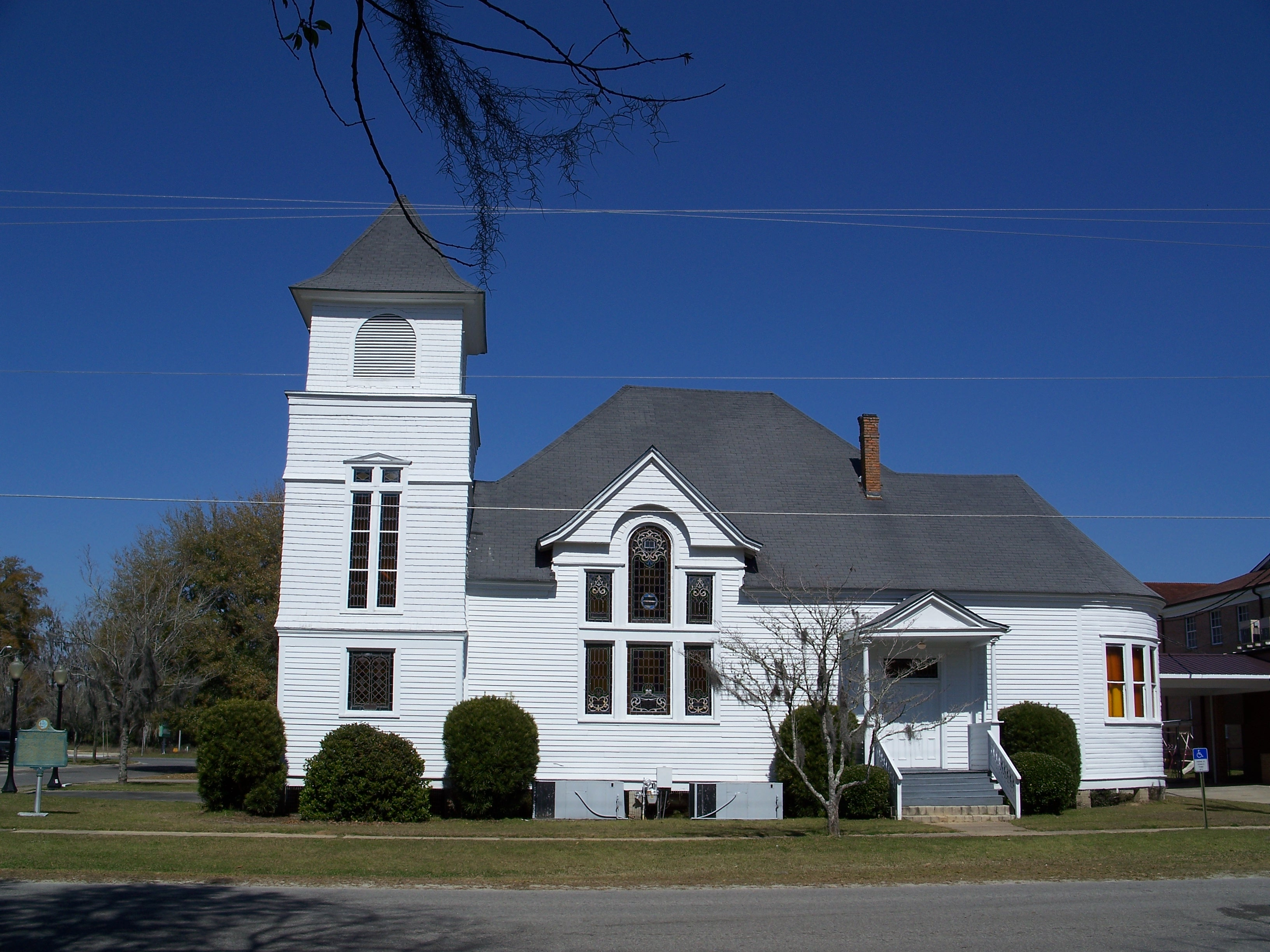

- Location within Florida Location within the United States
- Location: Madison, Florida
- Coordinates: 30°28′6″N 83°25′5″W
- Built: 1898+
- Architect: Stephen Crockett
- Architectural style: Queen Anne
- NRHP reference No.: 78000953
- Added to NRHP: November 14, 1978

The First Baptist Church is a historic U.S. Southern Baptist church in Madison, Florida. It is located at the corner of Pickney and Orange Streets. On November 14, 1978, it was added to the U.S. National Register of Historic Places.

== Gallery ==
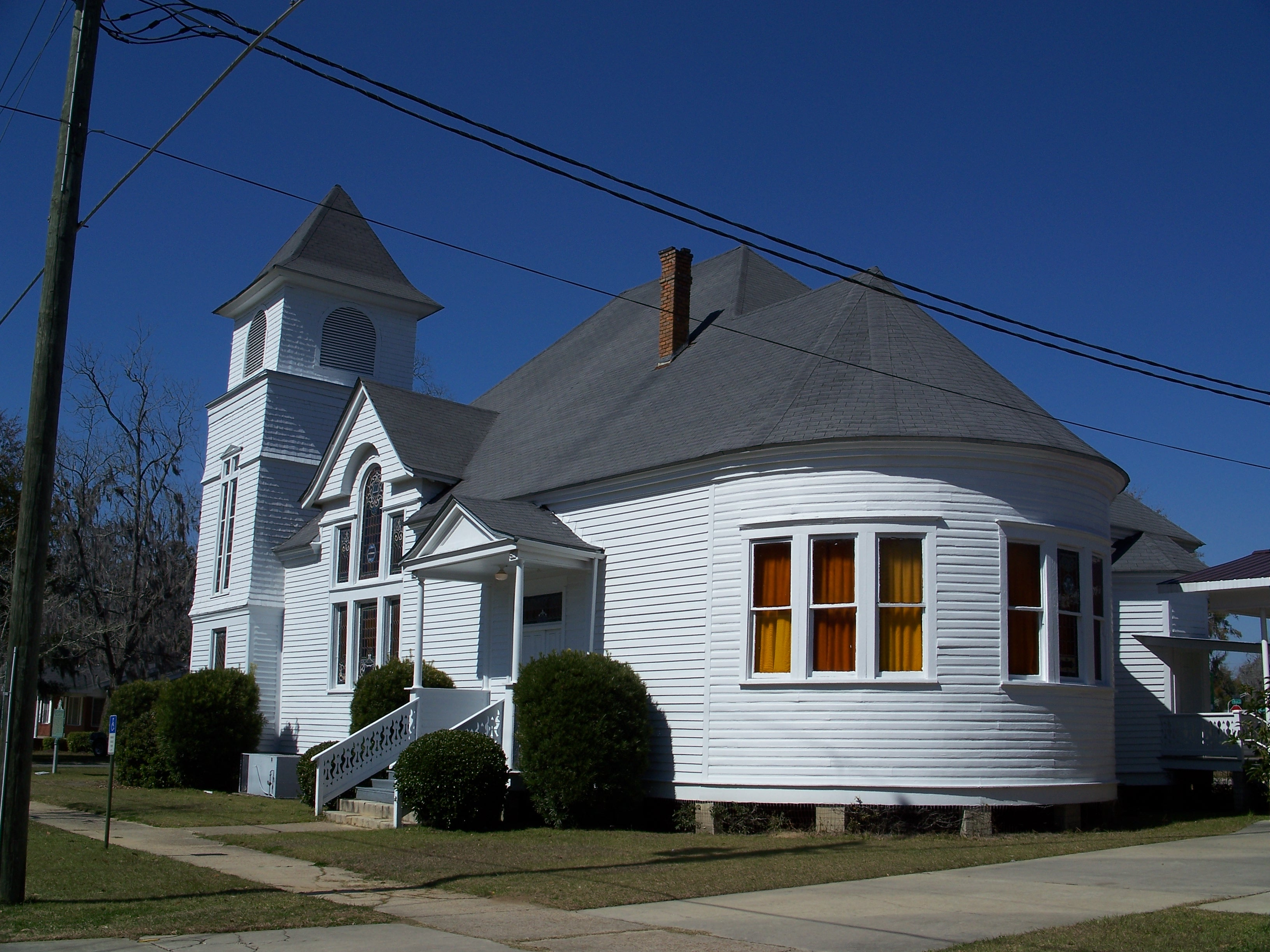

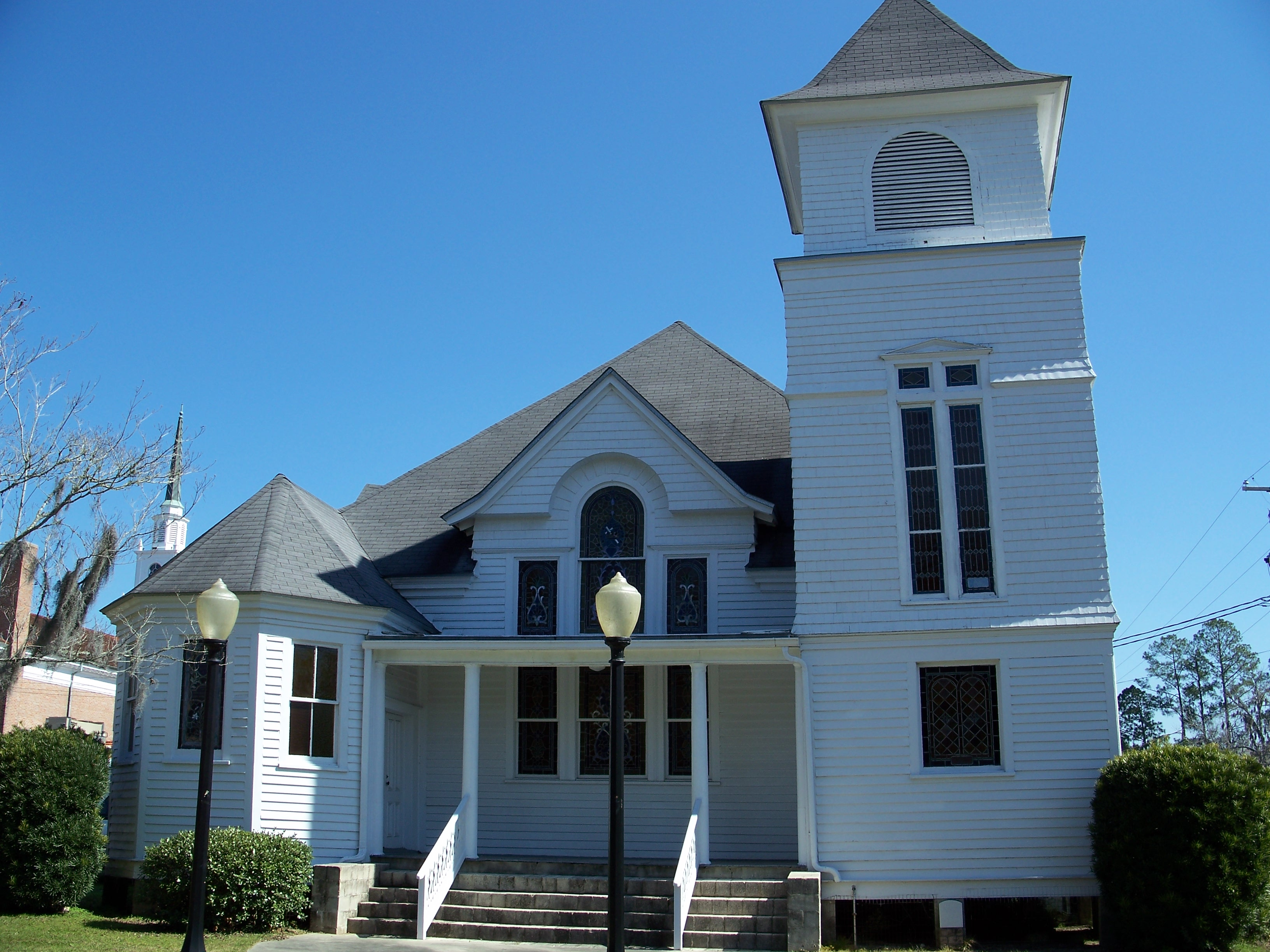

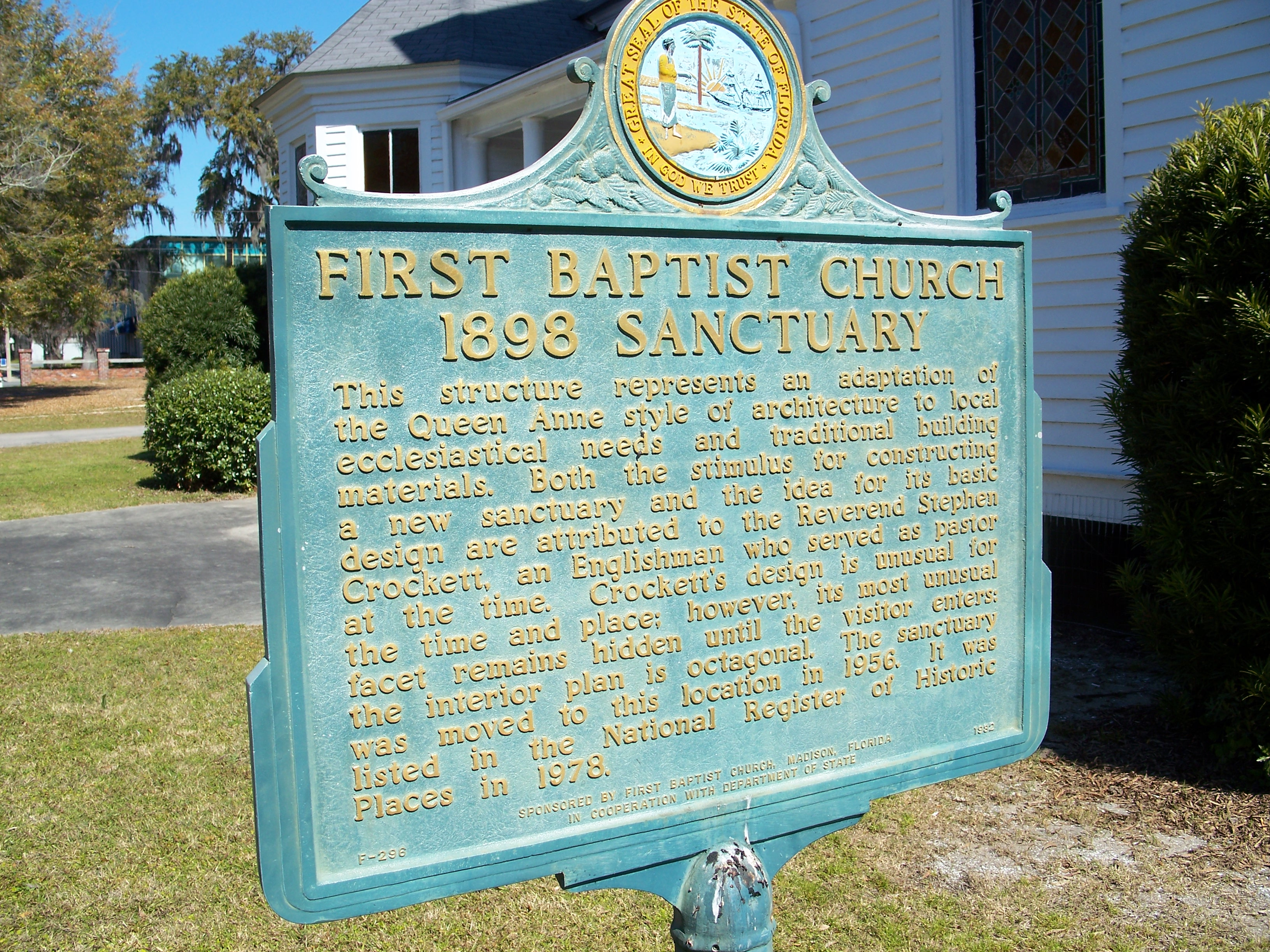
