= First Baptist Church (Cumberland, Maryland) =

Historic church in Maryland, US

- U.S. National Register of Historic Places
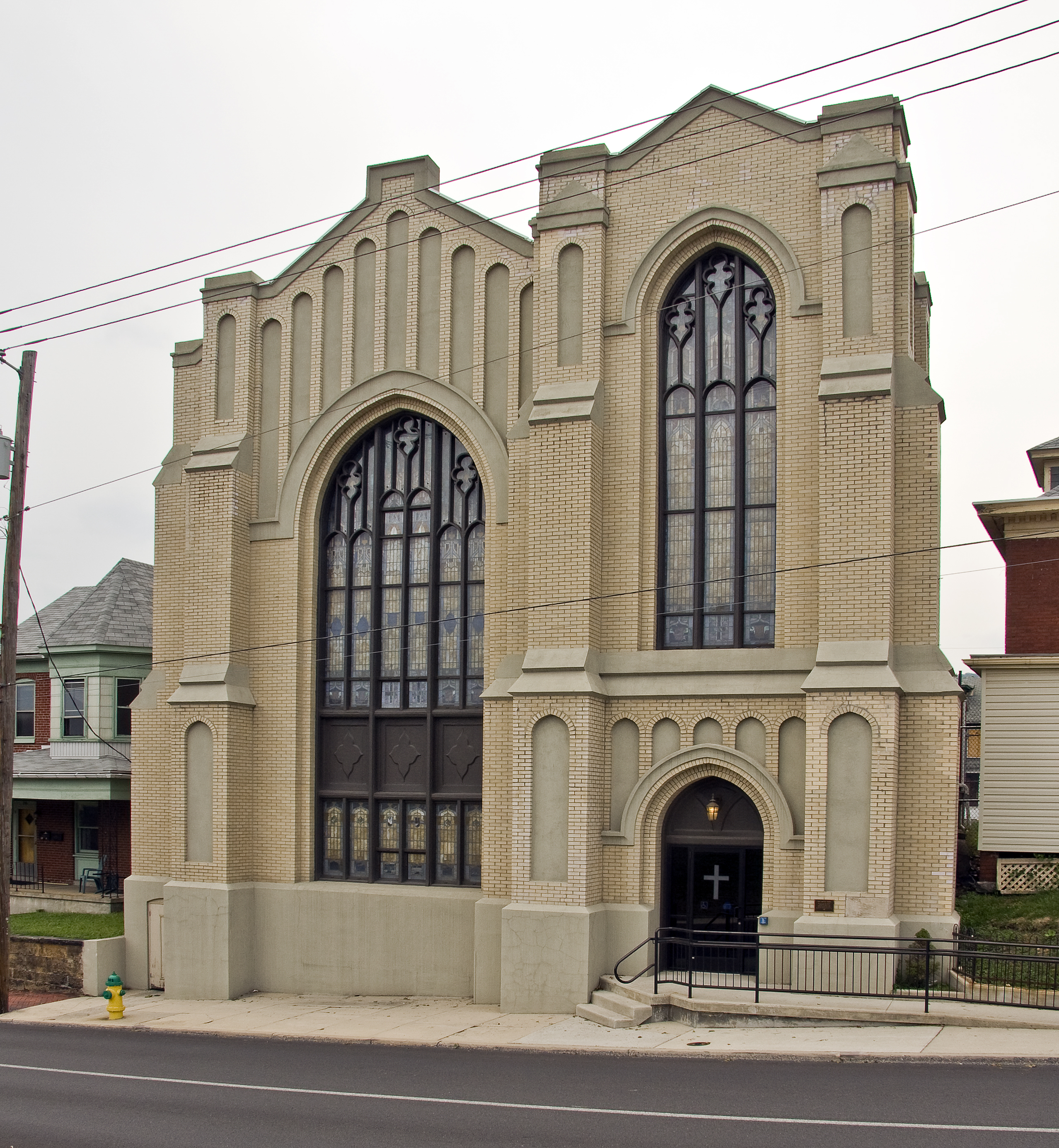

- Location within Maryland Location within the United States
- Location: 212 Bedford St., Cumberland, Maryland
- Coordinates: 39°39′21″N 78°45′41″W
- Area: 0.2 acres (0.081 ha)
- Built: 1849
- Architectural style: Gothic Revival
- NRHP reference No.: 80001776
- Added to NRHP: November 10, 1980

First Baptist Church is a historic church in Cumberland, Allegany County, Maryland. It is a T-shaped gable-front brick structure of one and a half stories, with a white glazed brick facade that was added in 1917 to the existing church structure erected in 1849. The architecture is a modest interpretation of the late Gothic Revival style.

It was listed on the National Register of Historic Places in 1980.
