= First Baptist Church of Brownsville =

Historic church in Oregon, United States

- U.S. National Register of Historic Places
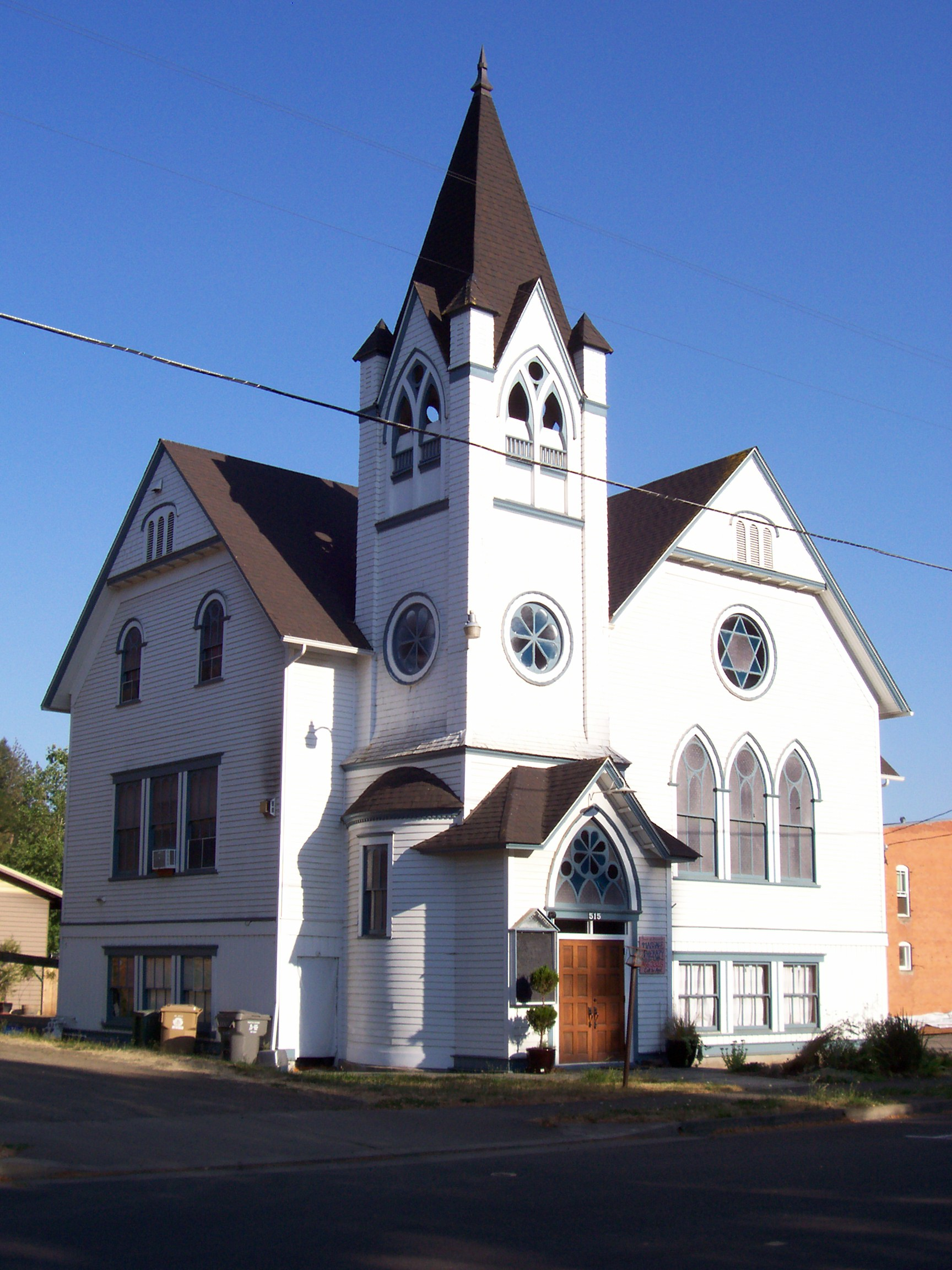

- Location within Oregon Location within the United States
- Location: 515 N. Main St., Brownsville, Oregon
- Coordinates: 44°23′44″N 122°59′1″W
- Area: 0.5 acres (0.20 ha)
- Built: 1907
- Architect: Gingrich, D.P.
- Architectural style: Late Gothic Revival
- NRHP reference No.: 91000807
- Added to NRHP: June 19, 1991

First Baptist Church of Brownsville is a historic church at 515 N. Main Street in Brownsville, Oregon.

It was built in 1907 and added to the National Register in 1991.
