= First Baptist Church (Dayton, Oregon) =

Church in Dayton, Oregon, U.S.

- U.S. National Register of Historic Places
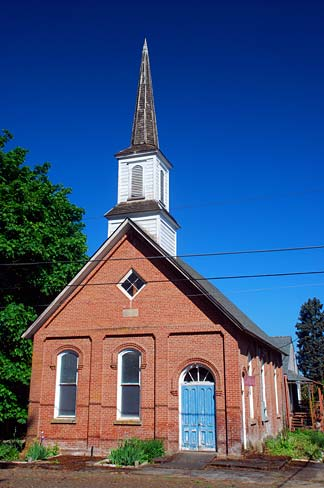
- The First Baptist Church in 2010

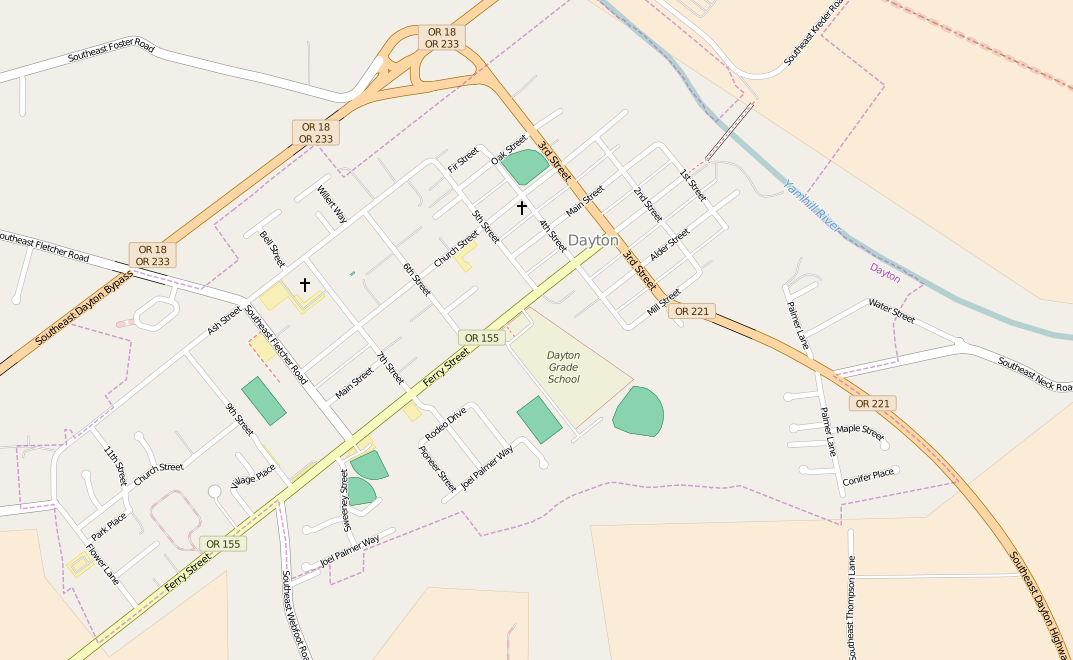
- Location within Dayton OR Location within Oregon Location within the United States
- Location: 3rd and Main Streets; Dayton, Oregon
- Coordinates: 45°13′18″N 123°04′36″W
- Area: 0.2 acres (0.081 ha)
- Built: 1886
- Built by: Jacob Seitter
- Restored: 2012–c. 2014
- MPS: Dayton MRA (AD)
- NRHP reference No.: 79002151
- Added to NRHP: October 16, 1979

First Baptist Church is a historic Baptist church building in Dayton, Oregon, United States.

The church building was constructed in 1886 and added to the National Register of Historic Places in 1979. In the mid-2010s, the building was restored and adapted for use as a restaurant.
