= First Baptist Church (Poughkeepsie, New York) =

Historic church in New York, United States

- U.S. National Register of Historic Places
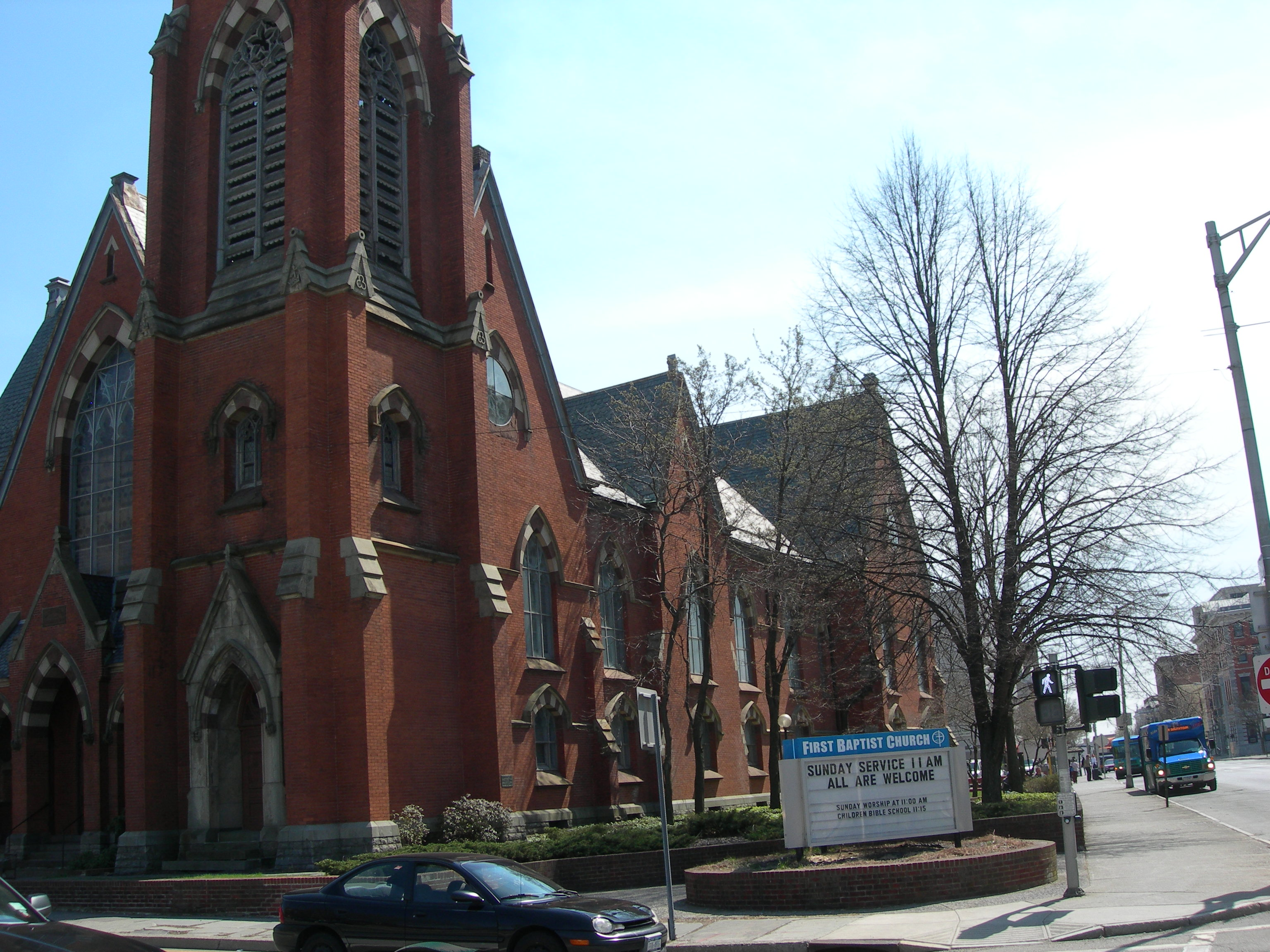
- First Baptist Church, April 2008

- Location within New York Location within the United States
- Location: 260 Mill St., Poughkeepsie, New York
- Coordinates: 41°42′19″N 73°55′43″W
- Area: less than one acre
- Built: 1875
- Architect: Post, James S.
- Architectural style: Gothic
- MPS: Poughkeepsie MRA
- NRHP reference No.: 01000774
- Added to NRHP: July 25, 2001

The First Baptist Church is an historic American Baptist church located at 164 South Cherry Street in Poughkeepsie, Dutchess County, New York. It was built between 1875 and 1877, and consists of a rectangular main church section, front entry pavilion, and tall rectangular bell tower. The brick building features Gothic arched openings and stone tracery.

It was added to the National Register of Historic Places in 2001.

The architectural design of the Baptist Church erected on the former site of the Temperance Hall on Mill Street was placed in the hands of the committee by Mr. James Strang Post, Architect, in July 1874. The edifice built has a frontage of seventy feet and a depth of one hundred and sixty feet; tower one hundred and eighty feet in height. The materials used are pressed brick, with Ohio and blue stone trimmings. The seating capacity was estimated to be about one thousand. The whole cost in 1874 was to be in the neighborhood of $55,000. The work commenced 1 August 1874.

The Corner Stone ceremony was reported in the Poughkeepsie Eagle News 11 Aug 1875, page 3. Many documents and articles of the time were deposited in the Corner Stone and listed in the newspaper article. The Corner Stone is made of brown stone and cut in relief on its outside was the year 1875. Inside the Corner Stone included the name of the architect James Strang Post, the many church officials, those present at the ceremony as well as an Honor Roll of those persons donating $1 or more to the building project fund. The church was organized in 1800. Its first church building was built in 1808 and removed in 1874 to prepare for the new structure in 1875. A larger house of worship was utilized in 1839 in Lafayette Place. The building of the 1875 structure allowed the two smaller houses of worship a facility large enough for all to attend.
