= First Baptist Church (Waterville, Maine) =

Historic church in Maine, United States

- U.S. National Register of Historic Places
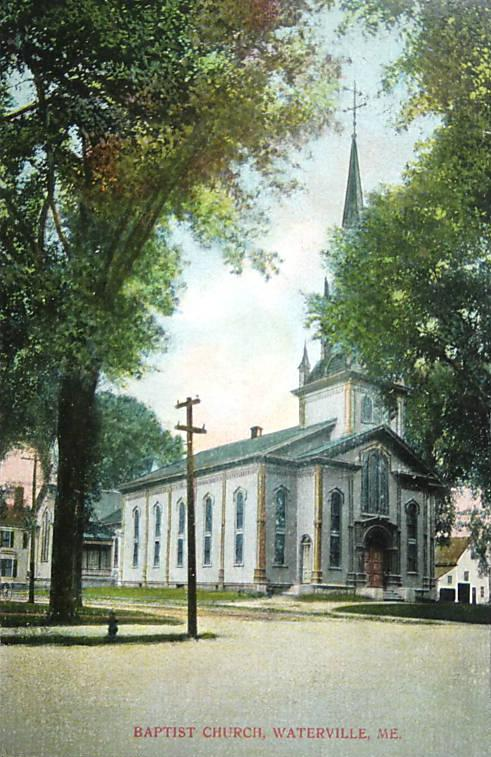
- General view in 1907

- Location within Maine Location within the United States
- Location: 1 Park St., Waterville, Maine
- Coordinates: 44°33′6″N 69°37′59″W
- Area: 2 acres (0.81 ha)
- Built: 1826
- Architect: James Packard; Francis H. Fassett
- Architectural style: Classical Revival, Late Victorian
- NRHP reference No.: 76000095
- Added to NRHP: November 07, 1976

The First Baptist Church is a historic church at 1 Park Street (corner of Elm) in Waterville, Maine. Built in 1826, it is the city's oldest standing public building. It was renovated in 1875 to a design by Francis H. Fassett. It was listed on the National Register of Historic Places in 1976.

== Description and history ==
The First Baptist Church building is located in the center of Waterville, at the northwest corner of Park and Elm Streets. It is a two-story wood frame structure, with a gabled roof, clapboard siding, and a granite foundation. It is basically rectanisgular in plan, with a projecting entry vestibule, and a vestry addition to the rear. The building's facade is ornately decorated, with paneled corner pilasters rising to bracketed eaves. Windows are narrow sash, separated between floors by panels, with moulded hoods above the second-floor windows. A tower rises above the main roof, with a square stage rising to an octagonal louvered belfry and then a steeple with flared base.

The Baptist congregation in Waterville was established in 1818 by Rev. Jeramiah Chaplin, and at first met in the town's meeting house. In 1824 the congregation began fundraising to build its own church, which resulted in construction of the present building two years later. In 1875, the building was renovated in the latest Victorian styles to a design by Portland-based Francis H. Fassett, then one of the state's leading architects.

Under the pastorship of Stephen O. Meidahl, the church became non-denominational and no longer affiliated with the Baptist Church; it was renamed simply First Church and as it states on its website it is "a non-denominational reformed church teaching historic Christianity" in a historic church building."

== See also ==
- National Register of Historic Places listings in Kennebec County, Maine
