= First Baptist Church (Owensboro, Kentucky) =

Historic church in Owensboro, Kentucky, United States

Coordinates: 37.774°N 87.109°W

The First Baptist Church in Owensboro, Kentucky, established in 1835 (191 years ago), is one of the oldest churches in the city. It has five pastoral staff members. It has programs for an age range of a few weeks old to 100 year olds. One activity includes the Family Pavilion during Owensboro's Barbeque Festival. It is affiliated with the Southern Baptist Convention.
