= First Baptist Church (Muncie, Indiana) =

Historic church in Indiana, United States

- U.S. National Register of Historic Places
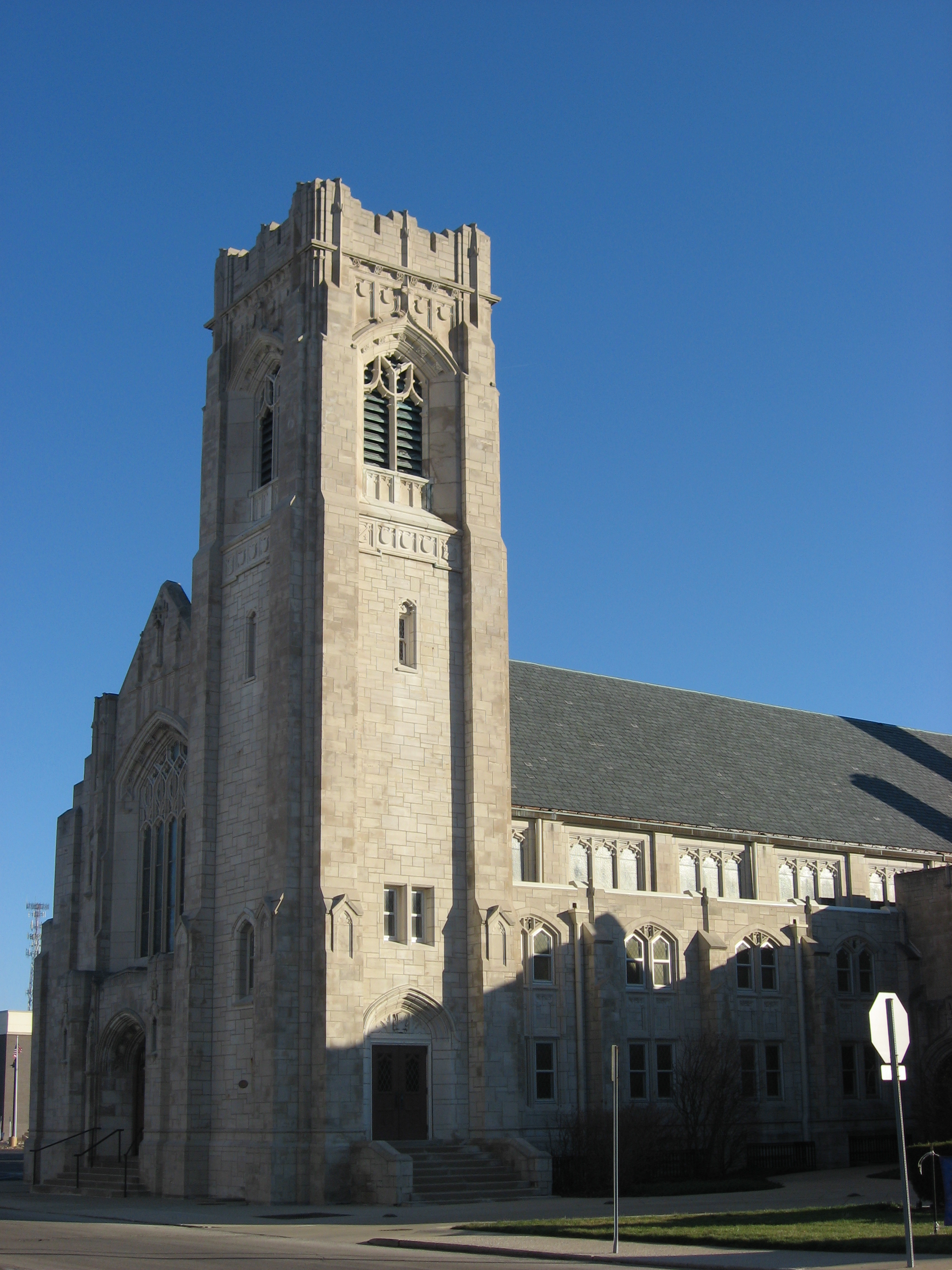

- Location within Indiana Location within the United States
- Location: 309 E. Adams St., Muncie, Indiana
- Coordinates: 40°11′30″N 85°23′2″W
- Area: less than one acre
- Built: 1928-1929
- Built by: Morrow & Morrow
- Architect: Hannaford, Samuel, & Sons
- Architectural style: Late Gothic Revival
- MPS: Downtown Muncie MRA
- NRHP reference No.: 88002125
- Added to NRHP: November 14, 1988

First Baptist Church is a historic Baptist church located at 309 E. Adams Street in Muncie, Indiana. The Late Gothic Revival building was designed by Samuel Hannaford & Sons and constructed in 1928–1929 by Morrow & Morrow. It is constructed of Indiana limestone and has a cruciform plan. It features and engaged five-story tower.

It was added to the National Register of Historic Places in 1988.
