= First Baptist Church (Waterboro, Maine) =

Historic church in Maine, United States

- U.S. National Register of Historic Places
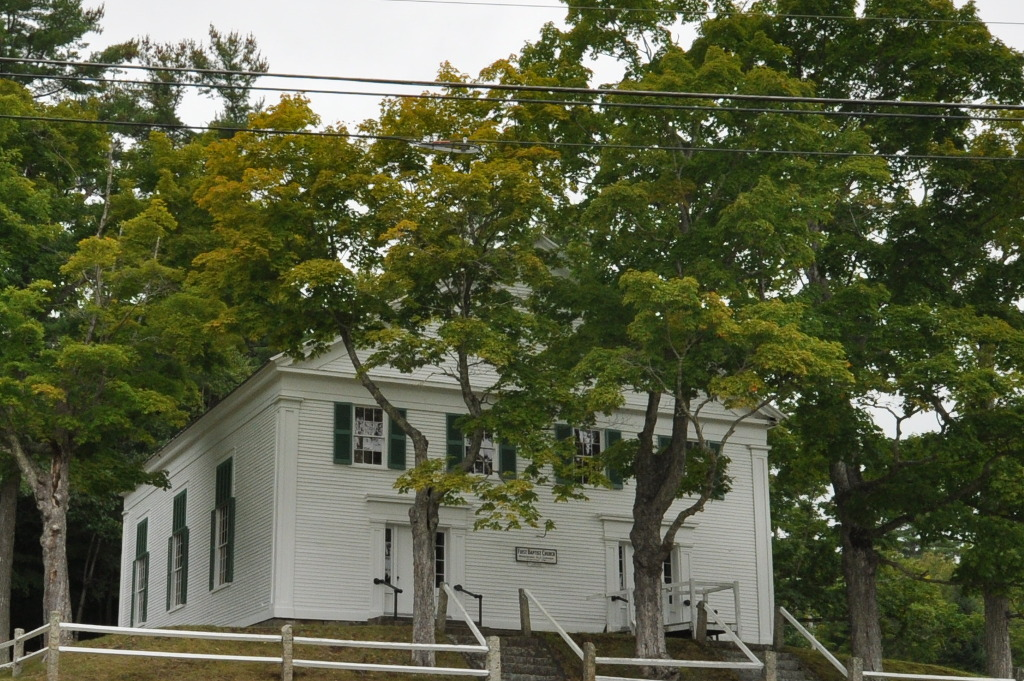

- Location within Maine Location within the United States
- Nearest city: Waterboro, Maine
- Coordinates: 43°32′16″N 70°44′12″W
- Area: less than one acre
- Built: 1849
- Architectural style: Greek Revival
- NRHP reference No.: 88000886
- Added to NRHP: June 28, 1988

The First Baptist Church, also known as the Old Corner Church, is a historic church at West and Federal Streets in Waterboro, Maine. Built in 1803-04 and altered to a Greek Revival appearance in 1849, it retains significant characteristics of more traditional Federal period meetinghouses. The building was listed on the National Register of Historic Places in 1988.

== Description and history ==
The Old Corner Church is located on a rise overlooking the southwest corner of West and Federal Streets, west of the main village of the town of Waterboro. It is a rectangular wood frame structure, about 40 by 50 feet (12 m × 15 m) in size, with a front-facing gable roof, clapboard siding, and a granite foundation obscured by a wooden water table. Its Greek Revival features include corner pilasters rising to a broad entablature, and a fully pedimented gable. The main facade faces east, and is symmetrically arranged, with a pair of entrances, each flanked by pilasters and topped by an entablature. At the gallery level there are four sash windows. The side walls each have five triple-hung sash windows, with the pilasters, entablature and water table continued from the front.

The entrances lead into a narrow vestibule area, from which two stairs (one now closed off) lead to the gallery. The interior has rows of bench pews leading to a raised sanctuary area, with additional pews at the sides of the sanctuary. The sanctuary houses the pulpit, organ, and seating for deacons, with a raised area at the rear set off by an ornate stained woodwork balustrade.

The church was built in 1803-04 for a Baptist congregation organized in 1791. When built, this building originally had a gallery extending around three sides; this was reduced to a rear gallery when the building received its Greek Revival treatment in 1849. Despite these stylistic alterations (as well as the addition of a pressed-tin roof around the turn of the 20th century), the building retains a clearer indication of its Federal period roots than other such buildings in the state. This church was in active use until about 1947; it is still maintained by the local Baptist congregation, and is used for special events.

== See also ==
- National Register of Historic Places listings in York County, Maine
