= First Baptist Church of Medfield =

Historic church in Massachusetts, United States

- U.S. National Register of Historic Places
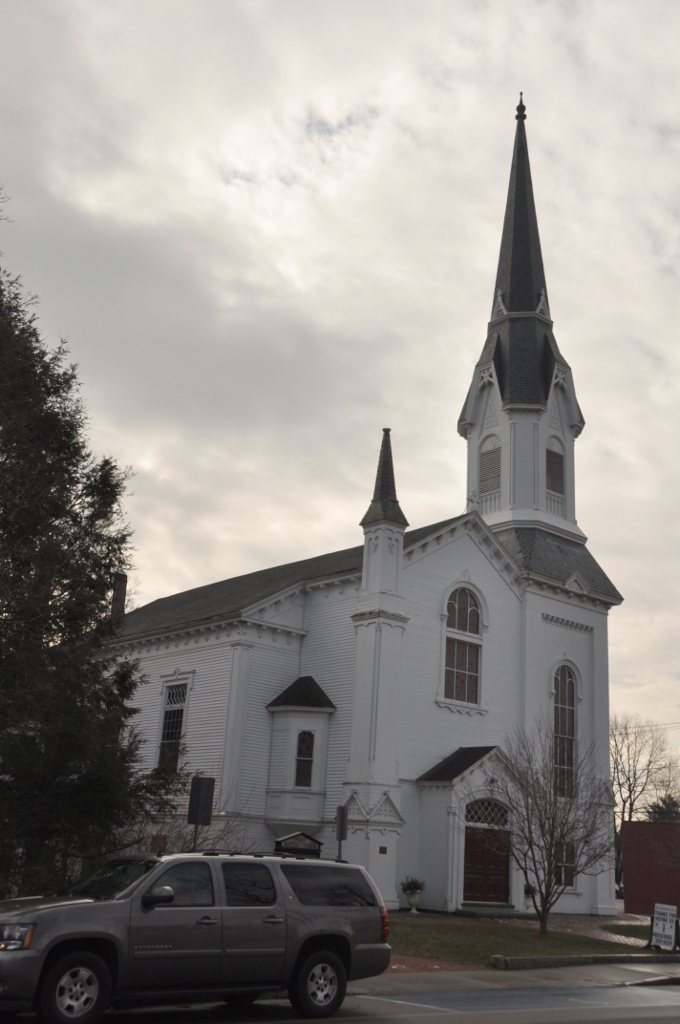

- Location within Massachusetts Location within the United States
- Location: Medfield, Massachusetts
- Coordinates: 42°11′13″N 71°18′15″W
- Built: 1874
- Architect: Jonathan E. Gleason; Arland A. Dirlam
- Architectural style: Gothic, Greek Revival
- NRHP reference No.: 03000921
- Added to NRHP: September 11, 2003

The First Baptist Church of Medfield is a historic Baptist church building at 438 Main Street in Medfield, Massachusetts, United States.

The church building, the second for the congregation, was constructed in 1838, and originally had Greek Revival styling. In 1874 it was significantly renovated, and given its present Gothic Revival appearance. The building was listed on the National Register of Historic Places in 2003.

The congregation was established in 1752. It was formally incorporated and given recognition in 1776 under Thomas Gair, its first pastor. Today it is a member of the American Baptists churches, and it theologically aligns with a Reformed Theology and movements such as The Gospel Coalition. Its worship today is a blend of Biblically founded, Gospel Centered preaching, and heartfelt praise. The music style is a blend of contemporary and traditional music. Worship starts at 10:00 a.m.

== See also ==
- National Register of Historic Places listings in Norfolk County, Massachusetts
