= First Baptist Church East Nashville =

Historic church in Tennessee, United States

- U.S. National Register of Historic Places
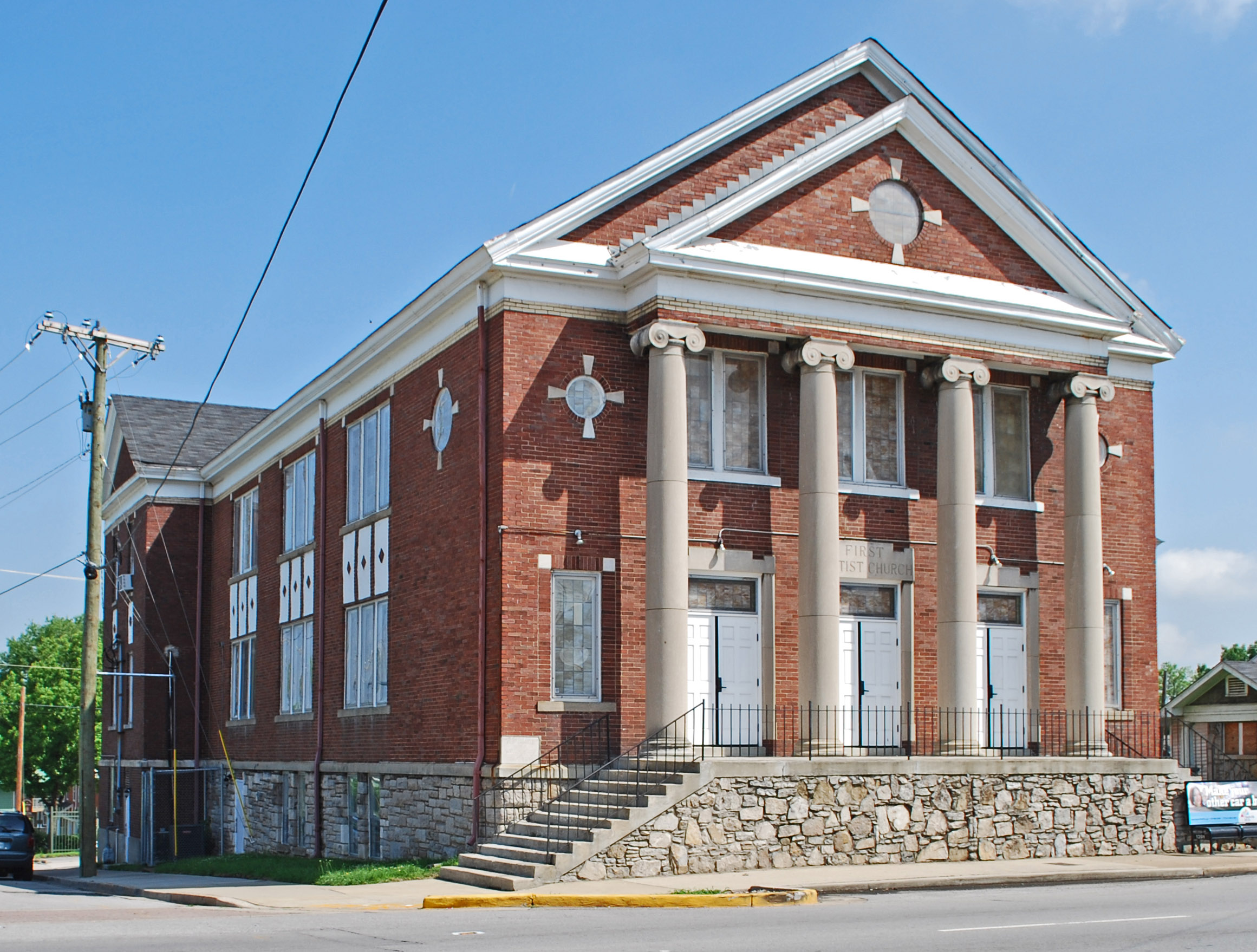

- Location within Tennessee Location within the United States
- Location: 601 Main St., Nashville, Tennessee
- Coordinates: 36°10′33″N 86°45′46″W
- Area: less than one acre
- Built: 1928
- Architectural style: Classical Revival
- NRHP reference No.: 05000761
- Added to NRHP: July 27, 2005

First Baptist Church East Nashville is a historic church at 601 Main Street in Nashville, Tennessee.

The Classical Revival building was constructed in 1928 and added to the National Register of Historic Places in 2005.
