= First Baptist Church (San Andrés) =

First Baptist Church of San Andrés
- First Baptist Church of San Andrés Island
- First Baptist Church of San Andrés
- 12°33′43″N 81°43′01″W
- Country: Colombia
- Denomination: Baptist
- Tradition: Protestant
- Churchmanship: Evangelical

History
- Status: Parish church

Architecture
- Functional status: Active
- Architectural type: Church

The First Baptist Church of San Andrés is a church on the Colombian Island of San Andres. Built in 1847, it is the oldest church on the island.

== History ==
The church was built in 1847 with pine wood sourced from the state of Alabama in the United States. After the church was built, its founders taught the former slaves of the island English. The church is seen as a great pride for the Raizals, the English-speaking ethnic group on the island who are mostly Protestant.
