= First Baptist Church (Covington, Virginia) =

Historic church in Virginia, US

- First Baptist Church of Covington, Virginia
- U.S. National Register of Historic Places
- Virginia Landmarks Register
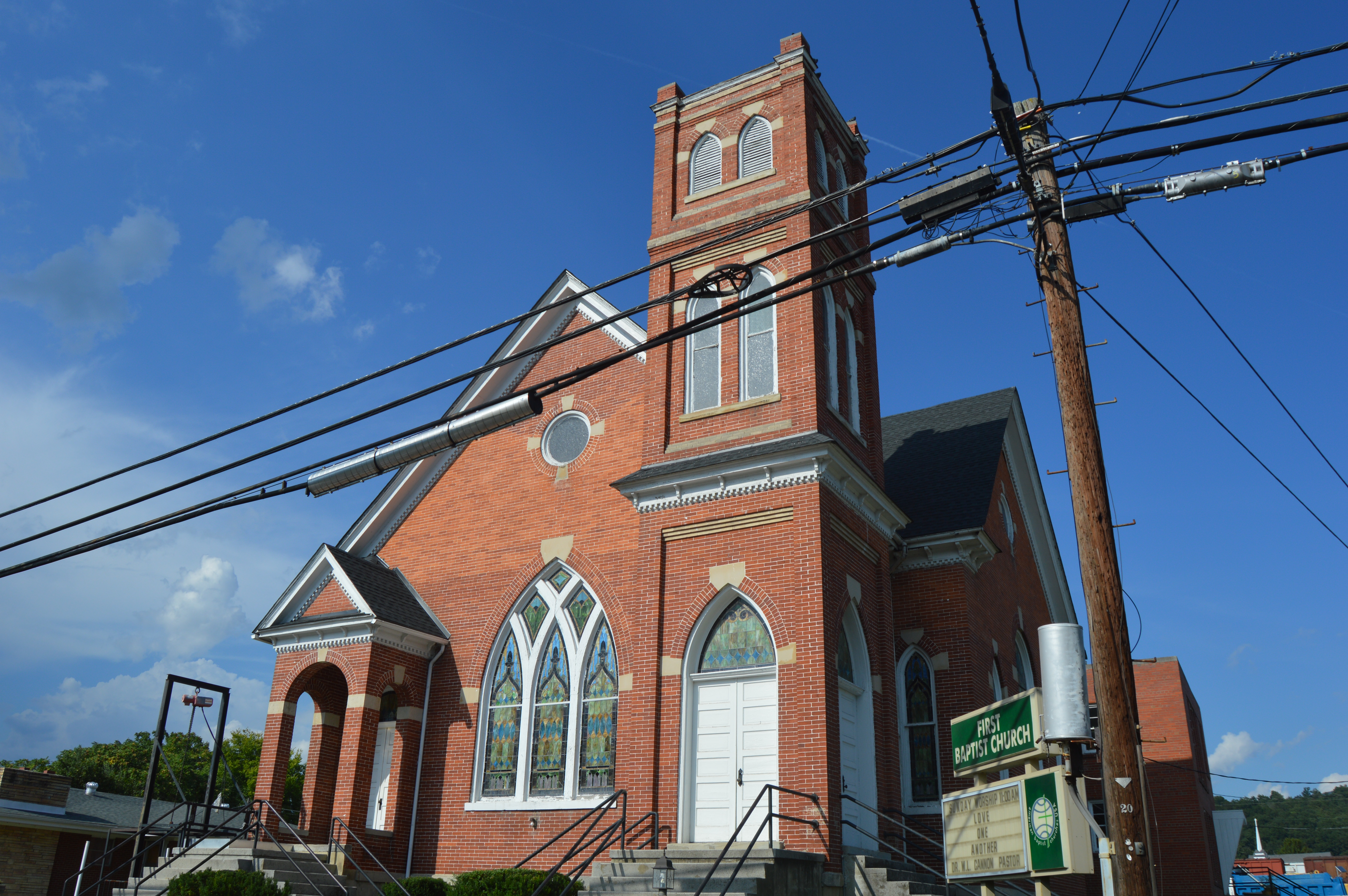
- Front and southeastern side

- Location within Virginia Location within the United States
- Location: 337 S. Lexington Ave., Covington, Virginia
- Coordinates: 37°47′11″N 79°59′35″W
- Area: 0.7 acres (0.28 ha)
- Built: c. 1890, 1911
- Architect: Hunter, James R. & Sons
- Architectural style: Gothic Revival, Colonial Revival
- NRHP reference No.: 01001518
- VLR No.: 107-0039

Significant dates
- Added to NRHP: January 24, 2002
- Designated VLR: June 13, 2001

First Baptist Church is a historic African-American Baptist church complex located at Covington, Virginia. The property includes two churches. One of the churches was built about 1890, and is a Gothic Revival style frame church. After construction of the 1911 church, it served as a classroom annex and cafeteria for a nearby school. The 1911 church is a Gothic Revival / Colonial Revival brick church. It features a corner belfry tower, lancet arched stained-glass windows, and a modernistic 1955 education wing.

It was added to the National Register of Historic Places in 2002.
