= List of Baptist churches =

This is a list of Baptist churches that are notable either as congregations or as buildings.

== Australia ==
Church	Image	Dates	Location	City, County	Description
Baptist Church, Ipswich		1877 built; 1938 modified; 2006 QHR	188 Brisbane Street; 27.6148°S 152.755°E	Ipswich, Queensland	Gothic Revival building designed by Richard Gailey built in 1877; given an Art Deco makeover in 1938, designed by George Brockwell Gill.
Baptist City Tabernacle		1890 built; 1992 QHR	163 Wickham Terrace, Spring Hill; 27.4646°S 153.0247°E	Brisbane, Queensland	Designed by Richard Gailey.
Sandgate Baptist Church		1887 built; 2003 QHR	6-8 Flinders Parade, Sandgate; 27.3202°S 153.0743°E	Brisbane, Queensland	Designed by Richard Gailey.
Brunswick Baptist Church		1859 founded; 1889 building	491 Sydney Road; 37.765534°S 144.962310°E	Brunswick, Victoria	

== United Kingdom ==
=== England ===
Church	Image	Dates	Location	City, County	Description
Metropolitan Tabernacle		1650 founded 1861 built (current church)	51°29′39″N 0°6′4″W	London	Building was the largest non-conforming church, world-wide, when built in 1861. Designed by William Willmer Pocock.
Soho Baptist Chapel			166a Shaftesbury Avenue	London	Built as a Baptist church in 1887–88; designed by William Gillbee Scott for a Strict Baptist church that had been formed in 1791. Now the Chinese Church in London.
Welsh Church of Central London, aka Welsh Baptist Chapel		1888-89 built		London	One of only seven Welsh chapels in London that continue to perform services in Welsh and minister to the London Welsh communities.
East Finchley Baptist Church		1902; 1931	Creighton Ave. 51.5939°N 0.1667°W	East Finchley, London	1902-built church, now the church hall, is Grade II listed building; current church built 1931.
Carey Baptist Church		1867 founded	51°27′11.1″N 0°58′47.13″W	Reading	Named for William Carey (1761–1834), a missionary to India, and continues to send missionaries to India.
Broadmead Baptist Church		1640 est. 1969 built (current building)	Union St. 51.45738°N 2.59140°W	Broadmead neighborhood, Bristol	First dissenting church in Bristol
Stoney Street Baptist Church		1799 built	Plumptre Place Rd. 52.952295°N 1.141293°W	Nottingham	Former Baptist church, later St. Marys Boys School
Park Lane Chapel, Farnham		1852 or 53 built	Bear Lane; 51.216585°N 0.798528°W	Farnham, Surrey	
Wellington Square Baptist Church		1838	47 Wellington Square; 50.856088°N 0.581905°E	Hastings, East Sussex	A Grade II*-listed Neoclassical chapel.
Evington Chapel, aka Baptist Chapel			Main Street & High St. 52.621055°N 1.074554°W	Evington, Leicester, Leicestershire, East Midlands	A small "Gothick" chapel, with a gabled front and crenellated parapets continued up over gable ends, with a pinnacle topping the front (west-facing) gable. West door has a "C14 type canopy with crockets and pinnacles". A Grade II listed building.
Central Baptist Church		1830 built	Bishop Street	Leicester, Leicestershire	Has a stuccoed front with a parapet, and is a Grade II listed building It has been renovated.
Robert Hall Memorial Baptist Church				Leicester, Leicestershire	Red brick church, Grade II listed.
Hansom Hall, also known as "Pork Pie Chapel"				Leicester, Leicestershire	Grade II listed. Built by Joseph Aloysius Hansom (best known for his invention of the Hansom Cab).
Quorn Baptist Church		Originally built 1770	Meeting St 52°44′26.53″N 1°10′30.39″W	Quorn, Leicestershire	
West Cliff Baptist Church		1891	Poole Road	Bournemouth, Dorset	Red brick church, Grade II listed.

See also List of Baptist churches in Leicester.

=== Wales ===
Church	Image	Dates	Location	City, State	Description
Monmouth Baptist Church		Built 1907	3 Monk St. 51°48′49.186″N 2°42′45.365″W	Monmouth	

== United States ==
There are numerous notable Baptist churches in the U.S., including many whose buildings are listed on the National Register of Historic Places.

=== Alabama ===
There are at least 36 notable Baptist churches in Alabama.

=== Arkansas ===
Church	Image	Dates	Location	City, State	Description
Oak Grove Missionary Baptist Church		1942 built 2003 NRHP-listed	33°49′57″N 93°36′39″W	Blevins, Arkansas	Has a "Plain/Traditional" style building
Mo-Ark Baptist Academy		1996 NRHP-listed	South of the western terminus of Park St. 36°29′52″N 93°23′57″W	Blue Eye, Arkansas	
Mount Zion Missionary Baptist Church (Brinkley, Arkansas)		1909 built 1986 NRHP-listed	409 S. Main St. 34°52′56″N 91°11′39″W	Brinkley, Arkansas	
Mt. Zion Missionary Baptist Church (Enola, Arkansas)		1952 built 2009 NRHP-listed	249 AR 107; 35°11′56″N 92°12′12″W	Enola, Arkansas	Bungalow/Craftsman
First Baptist Church (Eudora, Arkansas)		1900 built 1998 NRHP-listed	AR 159 S, 1 mi. S of Eudora33°5′24″N 91°16′8″W	Eudora, Arkansas	Bungalow/craftsman, listed within the Ethnic and Racial Minority Settlement of the Arkansas Delta MPS
South Side Baptist Church		1948 built 2006 NRHP-listed	2400 Dodson Ave. 35°22′19″N 94°24′24″W	Fort Smith, Arkansas	Moderne
Gravel Hill Baptist Church		1935 built 1992 NRHP-listed	Gravel Hill Road; 35°14′56″N 91°58′40″W	Gravel Hill, Arkansas	NPS Rustic architecture
Centennial Baptist Church		1917 built 1995 NRHP-listed	522 Arkansas St. 34°31′18″N 90°35′25″W	Helena, Arkansas	Late Gothic Revival
New Light Missionary Baptist Church		1917 built 1995 NRHP-listed	522 Arkansas St.34°31′18″N 90°35′25″W	Helena, Arkansas	Late Gothic Revival
New Hope Missionary Baptist Church Cemetery, Historic Section		built 1992 NRHP-listed	St. Marys St. 33°19′48″N 91°17′12″W	Lake Village, Arkansas	
First Baptist Church (Little Rock, Arkansas)		1941 built 1994 NRHP-listed	Jct. of 12th and Louisiana Sts., SW corner34°44′14″N 92°16′26″W	Little Rock, Arkansas	Late Gothic Revival
First Missionary Baptist Church (Little Rock, Arkansas)		1882 built 1983 NRHP-listed	701 S. Gaines St. 34°44′35″N 92°16′41″W	Little Rock, Arkansas	Gothic Revival
Main Building, Arkansas Baptist College		built NRHP-listed		Little Rock, Arkansas	
Mount Zion Baptist Church (Little Rock, Arkansas)		1926 built 1987 NRHP-listed	900 Cross St. 34°44′30″N 92°17′7″W	Little Rock, Arkansas	Prairie School
St. Peter's Rock Baptist Church		1941 built 2005 NRHP-listed	1401 W 18th St. 34°44′6″N 92°17′19″W	Little Rock, Arkansas	Plain/traditional
First Baptist Church (Marvell, Arkansas)		built 1991 NRHP-listed	Jct. of Pine and Carruth Sts. 34°33′26″N 90°54′44″W	Marvell, Arkansas	Vernacular Collegiate Gothic
Parkdale Baptist Church-AS0051		1910 built 2007 NRHP-listed	127 Bride St. 33°7′22″N 91°32′57″W	Parkdale, Arkansas	Late Gothic Revival
Prosperity Baptist Church		1904 built 2003 NRHP-listed	AR 8 W 33°52′29″N 92°33′9″W	Ramsey, Arkansas	Plain-Traditional architecture
Lone Star Baptist Church		2005 NRHP-listed	620 Sheridan Rd. 34°26′38″N 92°11′17″W	Redfield, Arkansas	Plain traditional
Canaan Baptist Church (Texarkana, Arkansas)		1990 NRHP-listed	Jct. of Laurel and 10th Sts. 33°25′59″N 94°2′29″W	Texarkana, Arkansas	Colonial Revival, Late Gothic Revival, Other

=== Arizona ===
Church	Image	Dates	Location	City, State	Description
First Baptist Church (Casa Grande, Arizona)		1938 built 2002 NRHP-listed	218 E. Eighth St. 32°52′51″N 111°45′2″W	Casa Grande, Arizona	Mission/Spanish Revival
First Baptist Church (Flagstaff, Arizona)		1939 built 1991 NRHP-listed	123 S. Beaver St. 35°11′43″N 111°39′3″W	Flagstaff, Arizona	Late Gothic Revival
First Baptist Church (Phoenix, Arizona)		1929 built 1982 NRHP-listed	302 W. Monroe St. 33°27′2″N 112°4′39″W	Phoenix, Arizona	Italian Gothic, Moderne, other architecture
Bethlehem Baptist Church (Phoenix, Arizona)		built 1993 NRHP-listed	1402 E. Adams St. 33°26′59″N 112°1′46″W	Phoenix, Arizona	Colonial Revival
Catalina American Baptist Church		built 2008 NRHP-listed	1900 N. Country Club Rd. 32°14′49″N 110°55′35″W	Tucson, Arizona	Modern Movement, Sculptural Expressionism, Other

=== California ===
Church	Image	Dates	Location	City, State	Description
First Baptist Church (Bakersfield, California)		1931 built 1979 NRHP-listed	1200 Truxtun Ave. 35°22′26″N 119°0′54″W	Bakersfield, California	Mission/Spanish Revival, Romanesque
Second Baptist Church (Los Angeles, California)		1926 built 2009 NRHP-listed	2412 Griffith Avenue; 34°1′16″N 118°15′23″W	Los Angeles, California	Lombardy Romanesque Revival
First Baptist Church of Orange		1912 built 1996 NRHP-listed	192 S. Orange St. 33°47′11″N 117°51′5″W	Orange, California	Queen Anne, Gothic
Friendship Baptist Church (Pasadena, California)		1925 built 1978 NRHP-listed	80 W. Dayton St. 34°8′36″N 118°9′4″W	Pasadena, California	Mission/Spanish Revival
Third Baptist Church (San Francisco, California)		1852 founded, 1952 built	1399 McAllister St.	San Francisco, California	Mid-Century
First Baptist Church of Ventura		2009 NRHP-listed	101 S. Laurel St. 34°16′45″N 119°17′4″W	Ventura, California	Late 19th and 20th Century Revivals
First Chinese Baptist Church of San Francisco		1880 founded, 1908 rebuilt	15 Waverly Pl. 37°47′36″N 122°24′25″W	San Francisco, California	Rebuilt with gothic elements out of ruins of old building
Beth Eden Baptist Church (Oakland, California)		1890 founded, 1982 built	1183-10th St.	Oakland, California	

=== Colorado ===
Church	Image	Dates	Location	City, State	Description
First Baptist Church (Alamosa, Colorado)		1907 built 2005 NRHP-listed	408 State Ave.37°28′8″N 105°51′53″W	Alamosa, Colorado	
First Baptist Church of Boulder		2004 NRHP-listed	1237 Pine St. 30°01′13″N 105°16′45″W	Boulder, Colorado	
First Baptist Church of Denver		1938 built 2005 NRHP-listed	230 E. 14th Av.--1373 Grant St. 39°44′18″N 104°59′1″W	Denver, Colorado	Georgian Revival
First Baptist Church (Greeley, Colorado)		1911 built 1987 NRHP-listed	Tenth Ave. at Eleventh St., NW corner 40°25′18″N 104°41′39″W	Greeley, Colorado	Neo-Classical
First Baptist Church of Moffat		1911 built 2008 NRHP-listed	401 Lincoln Ave. 37°59′54″N 105°54′18″W	Moffat, Colorado	Listed on the NRHP as part of the "Ornamental Concrete Block Buildings in Colorado MPS"
First Baptist Church of Salida		1895 built 2024 NRHP-listed	419 D Street; 38°31′56.28″N 105°59′32″W	Salida, Colorado	Gothic revival
First Baptist Church (Trinidad, Colorado)		1890 built 2000 NRHP-listed	809 San Pedro St. 37°10′31″N 104°30′27″W	Trinidad, Colorado	Romanesque

=== Connecticut ===
Church	Image	Dates	Location	City, State	Description
First Baptist Church (Bridgeport, Connecticut)		1990 NRHP-listed	126 Washington Ave. 41°10′35″N 73°11′53″W	Bridgeport, Connecticut	
Union Baptist Church (Hartford, Connecticut)		1871 built 1979 NRHP-listed	1913 and 1921 Main St. 41°46′52″N 72°40′37″W	Hartford, Connecticut	Early English Gothic Revival
Huntington Street Baptist Church		1843 built 1982 NRHP-listed	29 Huntington St. 41°21′12″N 72°5′57″W	New London, Connecticut	Greek Revival

=== Delaware ===
Church	Image	Dates	Location	City, State	Description
Welsh Tract Baptist Church		1746 built 1973 NRHP-listed	Welsh Tract Rd. 39°39′1″N 75°45′7″W	Newark, Delaware	
Cow Marsh Old School Baptist Church		1872 built 1976 NRHP-listed	Northeast of Sandtown on Delaware Route 10, near Sandtown; 39°2′31″N 75°41′42″W	Sandtown, Delaware	

=== District of Columbia ===
Church	Image	Dates	Location	City, State	Description
First Baptist Church of Deanwood		1938 built 2008 NRHP-listed	1008 45th St. N.E. 38°54′10.4″N 76°56′17.0″W	Washington, D.C.	Late Gothic Revival
Friendship Baptist Church (Washington, D.C.)		1886 built 2004 NRHP-listed	734 First St. SW; 38°52′54.768″N 77°0′42.9438″W	Washington, D.C.	James A. Boyce-designed, Romanesque
Third Baptist Church (Washington, D.C.)		1893 built 2008 NRHP-listed	1546 5th St., NW.	Washington, D.C.	Late Gothic Revival
Florida Avenue Baptist Church, Washington, D.C.		1912	623 Florida Avenue N.W.	Washington, D.C.	

=== Florida ===
Church	Image	Dates	Location	City, State	Description
First Baptist Church of Boca Grande		2009 NRHP-listed		Boca Grande, Florida	
Shady Grove Primitive Baptist Church		1935 built 2005 NRHP-listed	29°38′47″N 82°19′47″W	Gainesville, Florida	
Bethel Baptist Institutional Church		1838 founded 1904 built 1978 NRHP-listed	1058 Hogan Street; 30°20′9″N 81°39′30″W	Jacksonville, Florida	Late 19th and 20th Century Revivals
Florida Baptist Building		1924-25 built 1984 NRHP-listed	30°19′49″N 81°39′37″W	Jacksonville, Florida	Henry John Klutho-designed
Riverside Baptist Church		1926 built 1972 NRHP-listed	30°18′37″N 81°41′35″W	Jacksonville, Florida	Addison Mizner-designed
First Baptist Church (Lake Wales, Florida)		1990 NRHP-listed	27°54′2″N 81°35′1″W	Lake Wales, Florida	Classical Revival
Johnson Chapel Missionary Baptist Church		1997 NRHP-listed	27°7′49″N 82°26′54″W	Laurel, Florida	
First Baptist Church (Madison, Florida)		1898+ built 1978 NRHP-listed	30°28′6″N 83°25′5″W	Madison, Florida	Queen Anne style
St. Luke Baptist Church		1921 built 2003 NRHP-listed	30°46′23″N 85°13′24″W	Marianna, Florida	Gothic Revival
Central Baptist Church (Miami, Florida)		1926 built 1989 NRHP-listed	500 N.E. 1st Ave. 25°46′31″N 80°11′31″W	Miami, Florida	Dougherty & Gardner-designed in Renaissance, Classical Revival, Neo-Classical, Other
Mount Zion Baptist Church (Miami, Florida)		NRHP-listed	25°46′58.3536″N 80°11′59.661″W	Miami, Florida	
St. John's Baptist Church		1940 built 1992 NRHP-listed	1328 N.W. 3rd Ave. 25°47′14.4528″N 80°11′59.9748″W	Miami, Florida	McKissack & McKissack, Moderne
Mt. Pilgrim African Baptist Church		built 1992 NRHP-listed	30°37′11″N 87°2′26″W	Milton, Florida	Late Gothic Revival
Mount Olive Missionary Baptist Church		1998 NRHP-listed	30°34′42″N 81°31′8″W	Nassauville, Florida	

=== Georgia ===
Church	Image	Dates	Location	City, State	Description
Mount Zion Baptist Church (Albany, Georgia)		built NRHP-listed		Albany, Georgia	
New Corinth Baptist Church		built NRHP-listed		Americus, Georgia	
Kiokee Baptist Church		1808 built 1978 NRHP-listed	Kiokee Rd. 33°34′41″N 82°17′32″W	Appling, Georgia	
First Baptist Church of Augusta		1902 built 1972 NRHP-listed	Greene and 8th Sts. 33°28′21″N 81°58′3″W	Augusta, Georgia	Beaux Arts
Springfield Baptist Church (Augusta, Georgia)		1801 built 1982 NRHP-listed	112 12th St. and 114 Twelfth St. 33°28′43″N 81°58′18″W	Augusta, Georgia	
First African Missionary Baptist Church		1904-09 built 2002 NRHP-listed	30°54′36″N 84°34′22″W	Bainbridge, Georgia	
Needwood Baptist Church and School		1885 built 1998 NRHP-listed	31°16′54″N 81°26′28″W	Brunswick, Georgia	
Shiloh-Marion Baptist Church and Cemetery		1835 built 1984 NRHP-listed	32°9′36″N 84°32′36″W	Buena Vista, Georgia	Greek Revival
Sardis Baptist Church (Chattoogaville, Georgia)		built NRHP-listed		Chattoogaville, Georgia	
First African Baptist Church (Columbus, Georgia)		1915 built 1980 NRHP-listed	901 5th Ave. 32°27′46″N 84°59′12″W	Columbus, Georgia	Gothic Revival
First African Baptist Church Parsonage		1915 built 1980 NRHP-listed	911 5th Ave. 32°27′47″N 84°59′12″W	Columbus, Georgia	Late Victorian
Dove Creek Baptist Church		built NRHP-listed		Elberton, Georgia	
Springfield Baptist Church (Greensboro, Georgia)		built NRHP-listed		Greensboro, Georgia	
Hamilton Baptist Church and Pastorium		built NRHP-listed		Hamilton, Georgia	
Sunnyside School-Midway Baptist Church and Midway Cemetery Historic District		built NRHP-listed		Hamilton, Georgia	
First African Baptist Church at Raccoon Bluff		1900 built 1996 NRHP-listed	31°28′0″N 81°13′57″W	Hog Hammock, Georgia	Late Gothic Revival
Richland Baptist Church		built NRHP-listed		Jeffersonville, Georgia	
Hopeful Baptist Church		built NRHP-listed		Keysville, Georgia	
Zion Baptist Church (Marietta, Georgia)		built NRHP-listed		Marietta, Georgia	
Upper Lott's Creek Primitive Baptist Church and Cemetery		built NRHP-listed		Metter, Georgia	
Mother Easter Baptist Church and Parsonage		built NRHP-listed		Moultrie, Georgia	
Notchaway Baptist Church and Cemetery		built NRHP-listed		Newton, Georgia	
Nicholsonville Baptist Church		built NRHP-listed		Nicholsonville, Georgia	
Carswell Grove Baptist Church and Cemetery		built NRHP-listed		Perkins, Georgia	
Bethlehem Baptist Church Colored School		built NRHP-listed		Pine Mountain Valley, Georgia	
Bethlehem Primitive Baptist Church and Cemetery		built NRHP-listed		Quitman, Georgia	
Thankful Baptist Church (Rome, Georgia)		built NRHP-listed		Rome, Georgia	
McCanaan Missionary Baptist Church and Cemetery		built NRHP-listed		Sardis, Georgia	
First Bryan Baptist Church		1873 built 1978 NRHP-listed	575 W. Bryan St.32°4′55″N 81°5′58″W	Savannah, Georgia	
New Ogeechee Missionary Baptist Church		built NRHP-listed		Savannah, Georgia	
Tennille Baptist Church		1903 built 1994 NRHP-listed	201-205 N. Main St. 32°56′17″N 82°48′42″W	Tennille, Georgia	Charles E. Choate-designed; Gothic
Bethesda Baptist Church and Cemetery		built NRHP-listed		Union Point, Georgia	
First African Baptist Church and Parsonage		built NRHP-listed		Waycross, Georgia	
Whitesburg Baptist Church		built NRHP-listed		Whitesburg, Georgia	
Woodville Baptist Church and School		built NRHP-listed		Woodville, Georgia	

=== Idaho ===
Church	Image	Dates	Location	City, State	Description
Arco Baptist Community Church		1929 built 2001 NRHP-listed	402 W. Grand Ave.43°38′2″N 113°18′14″W	Arco, Idaho	Romanesque Revival
St. Paul Missionary Baptist Church		built NRHP-listed		Boise, Idaho	
First Baptist Church of Emmett		built NRHP-listed		Emmett, Idaho	
Jerome First Baptist Church		1931 built 1983 NRHP-listed	42°43′32″N 114°30′50″W	Jerome, Idaho	Built out of lava rock by H.T. Pugh, stonemason, and others
Mountain Home Baptist Church		built NRHP-listed		Mountain Home, Idaho	
Pine Creek Baptist Church		1932 built 1982 NRHP-listed	47.53871°N 116.23684°W	Pinehurst, Idaho	Tourtellotte & Hummel-designed in "nostalgic log cabin revival" style
Baptist Church (Weiser, Idaho)		built NRHP-listed		Weiser, Idaho	

=== Indiana ===
Church	Image	Dates	Location	City, State	Description
Second Baptist Church (Bloomington, Indiana)		1913 built 1995 NRHP-listed; 1997 NRHP CP	321 N. Rogers St. 39°10′9″N 86°32′20″W	Bloomington, Indiana	Romanesque design by black architect Samuel Plato
Little Cedar Grove Baptist Church		1812 built 1990 NRHP-listed	39°23′14.16″N 84°58′52.99″W	Brookville, Indiana	
First Baptist Church (Columbus, Indiana)		built NRHP-listed		Columbus, Indiana	A National Historic Landmark
Liberty Baptist Church (Evansville, Indiana)		built NRHP-listed		Evansville, Indiana	
Salem's Baptist Church		built NRHP-listed		Evansville, Indiana	
Big Run Baptist Church and Cemetery		built NRHP-listed		Indianapolis, Indiana	
First Baptist Church (Muncie, Indiana)		built NRHP-listed		Muncie, Indiana	
Rising Hope Baptist Church (Nashville, Indiana)					
First Baptist Church (Salem, Indiana)		built NRHP-listed		Salem, Indiana	
First Baptist Church (West Baden Springs, Indiana)		built NRHP-listed		West Baden Springs, Indiana	
		built NRHP-listed			

=== Iowa ===
Church	Image	Dates	Location	City, State	Description
Second Baptist Church		1902 built 1999 NRHP-listed	422 S. 18th St. 40°43′47″N 92°52′4″W	Centerville, Iowa	Late Gothic Revival, of an African-American congregation
First Baptist Church		1890 built 1983 NRHP-listed	1401 Perry St. 41°32′3″N 90°34′20″W	Davenport, Iowa	Romanesque Revival
Swedish Baptist Church		1883 built 1983 NRHP-listed	700 E. 6th St. 41°31′36″N 90°33′51″W	Davenport, Iowa	The building now houses Kingdom Generation Church.
Coal Ridge Baptist Church and Cemetery		1909 built 2006 NRHP-listed	1034 IA S71; 41°22′41″N 93°1′15″W	Knoxville, Iowa	Late 19th and 20th Century Revivals
St. John Baptist Church		1937 built 2002 NRHP-listed	715 6th St. SW; 43°7′55″N 93°12′42″W	Mason City, Iowa	Ecclesiastical architecture
Sciola Missionary Baptist Church		1871 built 1983 NRHP-listed	US 71; 41°2′3″N 94°59′9″W	Sciola, Iowa	
Franklin Regular Baptist Church		1881 built 2008 NRHP-listed	40°37′27″N 93°1′58″W	Seymour, Iowa	Late 19th and 20th Century Revivals
Sioux City Baptist Church		1916-18 built 1979 NRHP-listed	1301 Nebraska Street; 42°30′15.1″N 96°24′14.3″W	Sioux City, Iowa	Prairie School
Baptist Church		1847 built 1977 NRHP-listed	40°57′30″N 91°11′56″W	Sperry, Iowa	
Walnut Street Baptist Church		built 2000 NRHP-listed	415 Walnut St. 42°30′9″N 92°20′2″W	Waterloo, Iowa	Clinton P. Shockley - designed
First Baptist Church of West Union		1867 built 1999 NRHP-listed	Main and Vine Sts. 42°57′46.2″N 91°48′30.9″W	West Union, Iowa	Greek Revival

=== Kansas ===
Church	Image	Dates	Location	City, State	Description
Ebenezer Baptist Church (Atchison, Kansas)		built NRHP-listed		Atchison, Kansas	
First Baptist Church (Council Grove, Kansas)		built NRHP-listed		Council Grove, Kansas	
Pottawatomie Baptist Mission Building		built NRHP-listed		Topeka, Kansas	
Pottawatomie Baptist Mission Building and Site		built NRHP-listed		Topeka, Kansas	boundary increase
Calvary Baptist Church (Wichita, Kansas)		built NRHP-listed		Wichita, Kansas	

=== Kentucky ===
Church	Image	Dates	Location	City, State	Description
Belleview Baptist Church		1903 built 1989 NRHP-listed	6658 Fifth St. 38°59′9″N 84°49′35″W	Belleview, Kentucky	Fourth building of Southern Baptist church organized in 1803.
Drakes Creek Baptist Church		built NRHP-listed		Bowling Green, Kentucky	
First Colored Baptist Church (Bowling Green, Kentucky)		built NRHP-listed		Bowling Green, Kentucky	
Clifton Baptist Church Complex		built NRHP-listed		Clifton, Kentucky	
Cane Springs Primitive Baptist Church		built NRHP-listed		College Hill, Kentucky	
Harrods Creek Baptist Church and Rev. William Kellar House		built NRHP-listed		Crestwood, Kentucky	
Long Run Baptist Church and Cemetery		built NRHP-listed		Eastwood, Kentucky	
First Baptist Church (Elizabethtown, Kentucky)		built NRHP-listed		Elizabethtown, Kentucky	
Bethel Baptist Church (Fairview, Kentucky)		built NRHP-listed		Fairview, Kentucky	
First Baptist Church (Frankfort, Kentucky)		built 1868	201 Saint Clair Street; 38°11′50.6322″N 84°52′41.8872″W	Frankfort, Kentucky	
First African Baptist Church and Parsonage		built NRHP-listed		Georgetown, Kentucky	
Mt. Gilead Baptist Church		built NRHP-listed		Haskingsville, Kentucky	
Nolynn Baptist Church		built NRHP-listed		Hodgenville, Kentucky	
Mt. Pleasant Baptist Church		built NRHP-listed		Keene, Kentucky	
First African Baptist Church (Lexington, Kentucky)		built NRHP-listed		Lexington, Kentucky	
Chestnut Street Baptist Church		built NRHP-listed		Louisville, Kentucky	
Good Spring Baptist Church and Cemetery		built NRHP-listed		Mammoth Cave, Kentucky	
Joppa Baptist Church and Cemetery		built NRHP-listed		Mammoth Cave, Kentucky	
Mammoth Cave Baptist Church and Cemetery		built NRHP-listed		Mammoth Cave, Kentucky	
Mt. Moriah Baptist Church		built NRHP-listed		Middlesboro, Kentucky	
Bracken Baptist Church		built NRHP-listed		Minerva, Kentucky	
Munfordville Baptist Church		built NRHP-listed		Munfordville, Kentucky	
First Baptist Church (Murray, Kentucky)		built NRHP-listed		Murray, Kentucky	
Old Cedar Baptist Church		built NRHP-listed		Owenton, Kentucky	
First Baptist Church (Paintsville, Kentucky)		built NRHP-listed		Paintsville, Kentucky	
Tates Creek Baptist Church		built NRHP-listed		Richmond, Kentucky	
Cooper's Run Baptist Church		built NRHP-listed		Shawhan, Kentucky	
Smiths Grove Baptist Church		built NRHP-listed		Smiths Grove, Kentucky	
Salem Baptist Church		built NRHP-listed		Southville, Kentucky	
Viney Fork Baptist Church		built NRHP-listed		Speedwell, Kentucky	
Springfield Baptist Church (Springfield, Kentucky)		built NRHP-listed		Springfield, Kentucky	
Goshen Primitive Baptist Church		built NRHP-listed		Winchester, Kentucky	
Providence Baptist Church		built NRHP-listed		Winchester, Kentucky	

=== Louisiana ===
Church	Image	Dates	Location	City, State	Description
Emmanuel Baptist Church (Alexandria, Louisiana)		1950 built 2001 NRHP-listed	430 Jackson St. 31°18′42″N 92°26′50″W	Alexandria, Louisiana	Gothic Revival, designed by Favrot & Reed
St. John Baptist Church (Dorseyville, Louisiana)		built NRHP-listed		Dorseyville, Louisiana	
Spring Ridge Baptist Church		built NRHP-listed		Enterprise, Louisiana	
Bayou Rouge Baptist Church		built NRHP-listed		Evergreen, Louisiana	
Mount Lebanon Baptist Church		built NRHP-listed		Gibsland, Louisiana	
Macedonia Baptist Church (Holden, Louisiana)		built NRHP-listed		Holden, Louisiana	
Keachi Baptist Church		built NRHP-listed		Keachi, Louisiana	
St. Paul Baptist Church-Morehead School		built NRHP-listed		Kinder, Louisiana	
St. John Baptist Church (Lecompte, Louisiana)		built NRHP-listed		Lecompte, Louisiana	
Antioch Baptist Church (Shreveport, Louisiana)		1903 built 1982 NRHP-listed	1057 Texas Avenue; 32°30′13″N 93°45′12″W	Shreveport, Louisiana	Romanesque Revival
Walnut Creek Baptist Church		built NRHP-listed		Simsboro, Louisiana	

=== Maine ===
Church	Image	Dates	Location	City, State	Description
Indian River Baptist Church		built NRHP-listed		Addison, Maine	
Free Baptist Church (Auburn, Maine)		built NRHP-listed		Auburn, Maine	
First Baptist Church of Bowdoin and Coombs Cemetery		built NRHP-listed		Bowdoin Center, Maine	
Damariscotta Baptist Church		built NRHP-listed		Damariscotta, Maine	
First Baptist Church (E. Lamoine, Maine)		built NRHP-listed		E. Lamoine, Maine	
East Harpswell Free Will Baptist Church		built NRHP-listed		East Harpswell, Maine	
Eastbrook Baptist Church and Eastbrook Town House		built NRHP-listed		Eastbrook, Maine	
Free Will Baptist Meetinghouse		built NRHP-listed		Farmington, Maine	
Free Will Baptist Church (Former)		built NRHP-listed		Milo, Maine	
Free Will Baptist Church and Cemetery		built NRHP-listed		North Islesboro, Maine	
First Baptist Church (Portland, Maine)		built NRHP-listed		Portland, Maine	
First Baptist Church (Sedgwick, Maine)		built NRHP-listed		Sedgwick, Maine	
First Baptist Church, Former		built NRHP-listed		Skowhegan, Maine	
First Baptist Church (Waterboro, Maine)		built NRHP-listed		Waterboro, Maine	
First Baptist Church (Waterville, Maine)		built NRHP-listed		Waterville, Maine	
Wells Baptist Church Parsonage		built NRHP-listed		Wells, Maine	
North Yarmouth and Freeport Baptist Meetinghouse		built NRHP-listed		Yarmouth, Maine	
		built NRHP-listed			

=== Maryland ===
Church	Image	Dates	Location	City, State	Description
Leadenhall Street Baptist Church		1873 built 1979 NRHP-listed	1021-1023 Leadenhall St. 39°16′38″N 76°37′3″W	Baltimore, Maryland	Romanesque
Union Baptist Church (Baltimore, Maryland)		2009 NRHP-listed	1219 Druid Hill Ave. 39°18′6″N 76°37′41″W	Baltimore, Maryland	
First Baptist Church (Cumberland, Maryland)		1849 built 1980 NRHP-listed	212 Bedford St. 39°39′21″N 78°45′41″W	Cumberland, Maryland	Gothic Revival
Mettam Memorial Baptist Church		1835 built 1975 NRHP-listed	Old Court Rd. between Sudbrook and Reisterstown Rds. 39°22′41″N 76°43′10″W	Pikesville, Maryland	

=== Massachusetts ===
Church	Image	Dates	Location	City, State	Description
Baptist Society Meeting House		built NRHP-listed		Arlington, Massachusetts	
Osterville Baptist Church		built NRHP-listed		Barnstable, Massachusetts	
North Shore Community Baptist Church		built NRHP-listed		Beverly, Massachusetts	
Roslindale Baptist Church		built NRHP-listed		Boston, Massachusetts	
First Baptist Church (Boston, Massachusetts)		built NRHP-listed		Boston, Massachusetts	
Dorchester Temple Baptist Church		built NRHP-listed		Boston, Massachusetts	
First Baptist Church (Cambridge, Massachusetts)		built NRHP-listed		Cambridge, Massachusetts	
Old Cambridge Baptist Church		built NRHP-listed		Cambridge, Massachusetts	
First Baptist Church (Fall River, Massachusetts)		built NRHP-listed		Fall River, Massachusetts	
First Baptist Church (Framingham, Massachusetts)		built NRHP-listed		Framingham, Massachusetts	
Still River Baptist Church		built NRHP-listed		Harvard, Massachusetts	
First Baptist Church of Medfield		built NRHP-listed		Medfield, Massachusetts	
First Baptist Church (Methuen, Massachusetts)		built NRHP-listed		Methuen, Massachusetts	
First Baptist Church (New Bedford, Massachusetts)		built NRHP-listed		New Bedford, Massachusetts	
Union Baptist Church (New Bedford, Massachusetts)		built NRHP-listed		New Bedford, Massachusetts	
First Baptist Church in Newton		built NRHP-listed		Newton, Massachusetts	
Evangelical Baptist Church (Newton, Massachusetts)		built NRHP-listed		Newton, Massachusetts	
Myrtle Baptist Church Neighborhood Historic District		built NRHP-listed		Newton, Massachusetts	
First Baptist Church of Wollaston		built NRHP-listed		Quincy, Massachusetts	
Hornbine Baptist Church		built NRHP-listed		Rehoboth, Massachusetts	
Montville Baptist Church		built NRHP-listed		Sandisfield, Massachusetts	
First Baptist Church (Stoneham, Massachusetts)		built NRHP-listed		Stoneham, Massachusetts	
First Baptist Church and Society		built NRHP-listed		Swansea, Massachusetts	
North Taunton Baptist Church		built NRHP-listed		Taunton, Massachusetts	
Winthrop Street Baptist Church		built NRHP-listed		Taunton, Massachusetts	
Beth Eden Baptist Church (Waltham, Massachusetts)		built NRHP-listed		Waltham, Massachusetts	
Emmanuel Baptist		built NRHP-listed		Worcester, Massachusetts	

=== Michigan ===
Church	Image	Dates	Location	City, State	Description
First Baptist Church of Detroit		1909 built 1982 NRHP-listed	Woodward Avenue; 42°22′43.74″N 83°4′46.98″W	Detroit, Michigan	Late Gothic Revival church building, now Peoples Community Church
Second Baptist Church of Detroit		1975 NRHP-listed	441 Monroe; 42°20′5.61″N 83°2′36.36″W	Detroit, Michigan	Oldest African-American Baptist church in the midwest, located in Greektown Historic District
First Baptist Church of Grand Blanc		built NRHP-listed		Grand Blanc, Michigan	
First Baptist Church (Lansing, Michigan)		built NRHP-listed		Lansing, Michigan	
First Baptist Church of Flint, known since 1960s as Woodside Church		formed 1830s	until 2018, at 1509 E Court Street.	Flint, MI	Oldest Baptist Church in Flint, now American Baptist, Alliance of Baptists and United Church of Christ.

=== Minnesota ===
Church	Image	Dates	Location	City, State	Description
First Baptist Church		1868 built 1980 NRHP-listed	44°2′51″N 94°10′0″W	Garden City, Minnesota	
First Baptist Church		1874 built 1983 NRHP-listed	499 Wacouta Street; 44°57′9″N 93°5′24.5″W	Saint Paul, Minnesota	William W. Boyington-designed; Gothic Revival
Pilgrim Baptist Church		1928 built 1991 NRHP-listed	732 Central Avenue West; 44°57′10″N 93°7′52″W	Saint Paul, Minnesota	Romanesque Revival

=== Mississippi ===
Church	Image	Dates	Location	City, State	Description
Mt. Zion Baptist Church (Canton, Mississippi)		1929 built 2000 NRHP-listed	514 West North St. 32°36′54″N 90°2′29″W	Canton, Mississippi	Classical Revival
Zion Baptist Church (Collinsville, Mississippi)		1910 built 2002 NRHP-listed	32°36′32″N 88°52′53″W	Collinsville, Mississippi	Carpenter Gothic
Shubuta Baptist Church		1894 built 1994 NRHP-listed	Eucutta St. at jct. with US 45; 31°51′37″N 88°42′0″W	Shubuta, Mississippi	Carpenter Gothic

=== Missouri ===
Church	Image	Dates	Location	City, State	Description
Second Baptist Church (Columbia, Missouri)		built NRHP-listed		Columbia, Missouri	
Eighth and Center Streets Baptist Church		built NRHP-listed		Hannibal, Missouri	
Bear Creek Baptist Church		built NRHP-listed		Kirksville, Missouri	
Free Will Baptist Church of Pennytown		built NRHP-listed		Marshall, Missouri	
Mount Horeb Baptist Church		built NRHP-listed		Mineola, Missouri	
Second Baptist Church (Neosho, Missouri)		built NRHP-listed		Neosho, Missouri	
Mount Nebo Baptist Church		built NRHP-listed		Pilot Grove, Missouri	
New Hope Primitive Baptist Church		built NRHP-listed		Richmond, Missouri	
Antioch Baptist Church (St. Louis, Missouri)		1999 NRHP-listed	4213 N. Market St. 38°39′35″N 90°14′17″W	St. Louis, Missouri	Late Gothic Revival
First Baptist Church City of St. Louis, formerly First African Baptist Church	3100 Bell Avenue	built 1917 founded 1827		St. Louis, Missouri	
Pleasant Ridge United Baptist Church		built NRHP-listed		Weston, Missouri	
		built NRHP-listed			

=== Montana ===
Church	Image	Dates	Location	City, State	Description
First Baptist Church (Bozeman, Montana)		built NRHP-listed		Bozeman, Montana	
Saint John the Baptist Catholic Church		built NRHP-listed		Frenchtown, Montana	
First Baptist Church (Hardin, Montana)		built NRHP-listed		Hardin, Montana	
First Baptist Church (Stevensville, Montana)		built NRHP-listed		Stevensville, Montana	

=== Nebraska ===
Church	Image	Dates	Location	City, State	Description
Moses Merrill Baptist Camp		built NRHP-listed		Fullerton, Nebraska	
First Baptist Church (Red Cloud, Nebraska)		built NRHP-listed		Red Cloud, Nebraska	

=== New Hampshire ===
Church	Image	Dates	Location	City, State	Description
Second Free Baptist Church		built NRHP-listed		Alton, New Hampshire	
First Free Will Baptist Church and Vestry		built NRHP-listed		Ashland, New Hampshire	
First Baptist Church of Cornish		built NRHP-listed		Cornish Flat, New Hampshire	
First Freewill Baptist Church		built NRHP-listed		East Alton, New Hampshire	
First Baptist Church of Gilmanton		built NRHP-listed		Gilmanton, New Hampshire	
North Holderness Freewill Baptist Church-Holderness Historical Society Building		built NRHP-listed		Holderness, New Hampshire	
Evangelical Baptist Church (Laconia, New Hampshire)		built NRHP-listed		Laconia, New Hampshire	
United Baptist Church of Lakeport		built NRHP-listed		Laconia, New Hampshire	
First Free Will Baptist Church in Meredith		built NRHP-listed		Meredith, New Hampshire	
Free Will Baptist Church (New Durham, New Hampshire)		built NRHP-listed		New Durham, New Hampshire	
Baptist New Meeting House		built NRHP-listed		New London, New Hampshire	
First Free Will Baptist Church		built NRHP-listed		Ossipee, New Hampshire	
Freewill Baptist Church-Peoples Baptist Church-New Hope Church		built NRHP-listed		Portsmouth, New Hampshire	
First Baptist Church of Lebanon		built NRHP-listed		Lebanon, New Hampshire	

=== New Jersey ===
Church	Image	Dates	Location	City, State	Description
First Baptist Church (Hoboken, New Jersey)		built NRHP-listed		Hoboken, New Jersey	
Upper Meeting House of the Baptist Church of Middletown		built NRHP-listed		Holmdel, New Jersey	
Old School Baptist Church		1822 built 2024 NRHP-listed	46 West Broad Street; 40°23′16.3″N 74°45′53.2″W	Hopewell, New Jersey	Congregation formed in 1715. Also known as the Hopewell Old School Baptist Meeting House, and the First Baptist Church of Hopewell
Upper Freehold Baptist Meeting		1737 built 1975 NRHP-listed	Yellow Meetinghouse and Red Valley roads 40°10′8″N 74°28′28″W	Imlaystown, New Jersey	built in 1737, is the oldest Baptist meeting house in New Jersey
Orient Baptist Church		built NRHP-listed		Laurelton, New Jersey	
Manahawkin Baptist Church		built NRHP-listed		Manahawkin, New Jersey	
Mount Bethel Baptist Meetinghouse		1761 built 1976 NRHP-listed	Mount Bethel; 40°38′16.6″N 74°30′51.1″W	Warren Township, New Jersey	
Community of St. John Baptist		built NRHP-listed		Mendham, New Jersey	
Bethany Baptist Church		built NRHP-listed		Newark, New Jersey	
First Baptist Peddie Memorial Church		built NRHP-listed		Newark, New Jersey	
New Point Baptist Church		built NRHP-listed		Newark, New Jersey	
Calvary Baptist Church (Ocean View, New Jersey)		built NRHP-listed		Ocean View, New Jersey	
Cathedral of St. John the Baptist		built NRHP-listed		Paterson, New Jersey	
Penns Neck Baptist Church		1812 built 1989 NRHP-listed	US 1 at Washington Road; 40°19′52.8″N 74°38′12.4″W	Penns Neck, New Jersey	
Old Baptist Parsonage		built NRHP-listed		Scotch Plains, New Jersey	
Old School Baptist Church and Cemetery		built NRHP-listed		South River, New Jersey	
Locktown Baptist Church		built NRHP-listed		Stockton, New Jersey	
First Baptist Church of Caldwell		built NRHP-listed		Caldwell, New Jersey	Built in late 1880s Rebuilt in 1911

=== New Mexico ===
Church	Image	Dates	Location	City, State	Description
Clovis Baptist Hospital		1982 NRHP-listed	515 Prince St. 34°24′12″N 103°11′44″W	Clovis, New Mexico	
First Baptist Church (Las Vegas, New Mexico)		1922 built 1985 NRHP-listed	700 University Avenue; 35°35′44″N 104°13′1.8″W	Las Vegas, New Mexico	

=== New York ===
Church	Image	Dates	Location	City, State	Description
Baptist Temple		1894 built; 1995 NRHP-listed	360 Schermerhorn St. 40°41′11″N 73°58′48″W	Brooklyn, New York	Romanesque
Greenwood Baptist Church (Brooklyn, New York)		1900 built; 2016 NRHP-listed	461 6th Street; 40°40′8″N 73°58′48.5″W	Brooklyn, New York	Gothic Revival
Sand Lake Baptist Church		1805 built; 2004 NRHP-listed	2960 State Route 43; 42°38′7″N 73°32′59″W	Averill Park, New York	
Wheatland Baptist Cemetery		built NRHP-listed		Belcoda, New York	
Tremont Baptist Church		1904-1912 built; 2009 NRHP-listed	40°50′54″N 73°54′8″W	Bronx, New York	
Macedonia Baptist Church (Buffalo, New York)		built NRHP-listed		Buffalo, New York	
First Baptist Church of Camillus		built NRHP-listed		Camillus, New York	
First Baptist Church and Cook Memorial Building		built NRHP-listed		Carthage, New York	
First Baptist Church (Charleston, New York)		built NRHP-listed		Charleston, New York	
Clifton Park Center Baptist Church and Cemetery		built NRHP-listed		Clifton Park Center, New York	
Delphi Baptist Church		built NRHP-listed		Delphi Falls, New York	
Seventh Day Baptist Church		1835 built 2005 NRHP-listed		DeRuyter, New York	Architectural style Federal NRHP reference No. 05001136 Two-story, rectangular frame meeting house, sheathed in clapboard and with a gable roof.
Duanesburg-Florida Baptist Church		built NRHP-listed		Duanesburg, New York	
First Baptist Church of Fairport		built NRHP-listed		Fairport, New York	
Fenner Baptist Church		built NRHP-listed		Fenner, New York	
First Baptist Church (Geneva, New York)		built NRHP-listed		Geneva, New York	
Old School Baptist Church of Halcottsville		built NRHP-listed		Halcottsville, New York	
Hartford Baptist Church and Cemetery		built NRHP-listed		Hartford, New York	
St. Mark's Baptist Church		built NRHP-listed		Village of Highland Falls, New York	
First Baptist Church of Interlaken		built NRHP-listed		Interlaken, New York	
Livonia Baptist Church		1870 built 1977 NRHP-listed		Livonia, New York	
Himrod Baptist Church		built NRHP-listed		Milo, New York	
First Baptist Church of Mumford		built NRHP-listed		Mumford, New York	
First Baptist Church (Newfane, New York)		built NRHP-listed		Newfane, New York	
First Baptist Church of Cold Spring		built NRHP-listed		Nelsonville, New York	
Emmanuel Baptist Church (New York, New York)		built NRHP-listed		New York, New York	
Norway Baptist Church (former)		built NRHP-listed		Norway, New York	
First Baptist Church of Ossining		built NRHP-listed		Ossining, New York	
Otsdawa Baptist Church		built NRHP-listed		Otsdawa, New York	
First Baptist Church of Painted Post		built NRHP-listed		Painted Post, New York	
First Baptist Church of Phelps		built NRHP-listed		Phelps, New York	
First Baptist Church (Poughkeepsie, New York)		built NRHP-listed		Poughkeepsie, New York	
Second Baptist Church (Poughkeepsie, New York)		built NRHP-listed		Poughkeepsie, New York	
Immanuel Baptist Church (Rochester, New York)		built NRHP-listed		Rochester, New York	
First Old School Baptist Church of Roxbury and Vega Cemetery		built NRHP-listed		Roxbury, New York	
Second Old School Baptist Church of Roxbury		built NRHP-listed		Roxbury, New York	
First Baptist Church (Sandy Creek, New York)		built NRHP-listed		Sandy Creek, New York	
Olive and Hurley Old School Baptist Church		built NRHP-listed		Shokan, New York	
Primitive Baptist Church of Brookfield		built NRHP-listed		Slate Hill, New York	
The Baptist Church of Springville		built NRHP-listed		Springville, New York	
First Baptist Church and Rectory		built NRHP-listed		Tarrytown, New York	
Second Baptist Society of Ulysses		built NRHP-listed		Trumansburg, New York	
Ten Mile River Baptist Church		built NRHP-listed		Tusten, New York	
First Baptist Church of Deerfield		built NRHP-listed		Utica, New York	
First Baptist Church of Watkins Glen		built NRHP-listed		Watkins Glen, New York	
Webster Baptist Church		built NRHP-listed		Webster, New York	
Wells Baptist Church		built NRHP-listed		Wells, New York	
First Baptist Church of Weedsport		built NRHP-listed		Weedsport, New York	
First Baptist Church		1881 built	New Hartford St.	Wolcott, New York	Romanesque Revival; one of three contributing buildings in Wolcott Square Historic District, built in 1881 and extended in 1927
		built NRHP-listed			

=== North Carolina ===
Church	Image	Dates	Location	City, State	Description
First Baptist Church (Andrews, North Carolina)		built NRHP-listed		Andrews, North Carolina	
First Baptist Church (Asheville, North Carolina)		built NRHP-listed		Asheville, North Carolina	
Bear Grass Primitive Baptist Church		built NRHP-listed		Bear Grass, North Carolina	
Red Banks Primitive Baptist Church		built NRHP-listed		Bell Fork, North Carolina	
Hannah's Creek Primitive Baptist Church		built NRHP-listed		Benson, North Carolina	
Shiloh Primitive Baptist Church		built NRHP-listed		Brogden, North Carolina	
First Baptist Church (Burlington, North Carolina)		built NRHP-listed		Burlington, North Carolina	
Oconaluftee Baptist Church		built NRHP-listed		Cherokee, North Carolina	
First Baptist Church–West				Charlotte, North Carolina	
First Baptist Church (Eden, North Carolina)		built NRHP-listed		Eden, North Carolina	
Mt. Sinai Baptist Church		built NRHP-listed		Eden, North Carolina	
Smithwick's Creek Primitive Baptist Church		built NRHP-listed		Farm Life, North Carolina	
First Baptist Church (Fayetteville, North Carolina)		built NRHP-listed		Fayetteville, North Carolina	
Forest City Baptist Church		built NRHP-listed		Forest City, North Carolina	
Forestville Baptist Church		built NRHP-listed		Forestville, North Carolina	
Cape Fear Baptist Church		built NRHP-listed		Grays Creek, North Carolina	
Spring Green Primitive Baptist Church		built NRHP-listed		Hamilton, North Carolina	
Damascus Baptist Church Arbor		built NRHP-listed		Harmony, North Carolina	
Baptist Chapel Church and Cemetery		built NRHP-listed		Helton, North Carolina	
First Baptist Church (High Point, North Carolina)		built NRHP-listed		High Point, North Carolina	
Black River Presbyterian and Ivanhoe Baptist Churches		built NRHP-listed		Ivanhoe, North Carolina	
Jamesville Primitive Baptist Church and Cemetery		built NRHP-listed		Jamesville, North Carolina	
First Baptist Church (Kernersville, North Carolina)		built NRHP-listed		Kernersville, North Carolina	
Kinston Baptist-White Rock Presbyterian Church		built NRHP-listed		Kinston, North Carolina	
First Baptist Church (Lincolnton, North Carolina)		built NRHP-listed		Lincolnton, North Carolina	
Jersey Baptist Church Cemetery		built NRHP-listed		Linwood, North Carolina	
California Creek Missionary Baptist Church		built NRHP-listed		Mars Hill, North Carolina	
First Baptist Church (New Bern, North Carolina)		built NRHP-listed		New Bern, North Carolina	
First Missionary Baptist Church (New Bern, North Carolina)		built NRHP-listed		New Bern, North Carolina	
Mount Shiloh Missionary Baptist Church		built NRHP-listed		New Bern, North Carolina	
St. John's Missionary Baptist Church		built NRHP-listed		New Bern, North Carolina	
First Baptist Church (Reidsville, North Carolina)		built NRHP-listed		Reidsville, North Carolina	
Robersonville Primitive Baptist Church		built NRHP-listed		Robersonville, North Carolina	
Mount Zion Baptist Church (Salisbury, North Carolina)		built NRHP-listed		Salisbury, North Carolina	
Kehukee Primitive Baptist Church		built NRHP-listed		Scotland Neck, North Carolina	
Eastern Star Baptist Church		built NRHP-listed		Tarboro, North Carolina	
St. Paul Baptist Church (Tarboro, North Carolina)		built NRHP-listed		Tarboro, North Carolina	
Webster Baptist Church		built NRHP-listed		Webster, North Carolina	
Skewarkey Primitive Baptist Church		built NRHP-listed		Williamston, North Carolina	
Brassfield Baptist Church		built NRHP-listed		Wilton, North Carolina	
Mars Hill Baptist Church		built NRHP-listed		Winston-Salem, North Carolina	
The Summit Church			12 campuses across the Raleigh-Durham area	Durham, NC	
Bridge42 Church				Morganton, NC	

=== North Dakota ===
Church	Image	Dates	Location	City, State	Description
Liberty Baptist Church		1902 built 1987 NRHP-listed	Fifth & Christina Sts. 47°51′24″N 100°31′29″W	Kief, North Dakota	Late Gothic Revival

=== Ohio ===
Church	Image	Dates	Location	City, State	Description
Mount Zion Baptist Church (Athens, Ohio)		built NRHP-listed		Athens, Ohio	
Free Will Baptist Church of Auburn		built NRHP-listed		Auburn Corners, Ohio	
Bedford Baptist Church		built NRHP-listed		Bedford, Ohio	
Columbia Baptist Cemetery		built NRHP-listed		Cincinnati, Ohio	
Union Baptist Cemetery		built NRHP-listed		Cincinnati, Ohio	
Shiloh Baptist Church (Cleveland, Ohio)		built NRHP-listed		Cleveland, Ohio	
Columbia Baptist Church		built NRHP-listed		Columbia Center, Ohio	
Shiloh Baptist Church (Columbus, Ohio)		built NRHP-listed		Columbus, Ohio	
West Baptist Church		built NRHP-listed		Lebanon, Ohio	
Park Avenue Baptist Church		built NRHP-listed		Mansfield, Ohio	
Mechanicsburg Baptist Church		built NRHP-listed		Mechanicsburg, Ohio	
Second Baptist Church (Mechanicsburg, Ohio)		built NRHP-listed		Mechanicsburg, Ohio	
Bethel Baptist Church (Pataskala, Ohio)		built NRHP-listed		Pataskala, Ohio	
Second Baptist Church (Sandusky, Ohio)		built NRHP-listed		Sandusky, Ohio	
Ashland Avenue Baptist Church		built NRHP-listed	Ashland and Woodruff Sts. 41°39′37.55″N 83°32′56.88″W	Toledo, Ohio	Romanesque-style
First Baptist Church (Vermilion, Ohio)		built NRHP-listed		Vermilion, Ohio	
		built NRHP-listed			

=== Oklahoma ===
Church	Image	Dates	Location	City, State	Description
First Baptist Church (Colored)		built NRHP-listed		Anadarko, Oklahoma	
New Hope Baptist Church (Chickasha, Oklahoma)		built NRHP-listed		Chickasha, Oklahoma	
Hopewell Baptist Church		built NRHP-listed		Edmond, Oklahoma	
St. Paul Baptist Church and Cemetery		built NRHP-listed		Meeker, Oklahoma	
Morison Baptist Church		built NRHP-listed		Morrison, Oklahoma	or is it Morrison Baptist Church? try wp:NRIS info issues OK
First Baptist Church (Muskogee, Oklahoma)		built NRHP-listed		Muskogee, Oklahoma	
Central Baptist Church (Muskogee, Oklahoma)		built NRHP-listed		Muskogee, Oklahoma	
Calvary Baptist Church (Oklahoma City, Oklahoma)		built NRHP-listed		Oklahoma City, Oklahoma	
Eastside Baptist Church		built NRHP-listed		Okmulgee, Oklahoma	
First Baptist Central Church		built NRHP-listed		Okmulgee, Oklahoma	
Irving Baptist Church		built NRHP-listed		Ryan, Oklahoma	
St. Thomas Primitive Baptist Church		built NRHP-listed		Summit, Oklahoma	
Bethel Missionary Baptist Church		built NRHP-listed		Tatums, Oklahoma	
Mount Zion Baptist Church (Tulsa, Oklahoma)		built NRHP-listed		Tulsa, Oklahoma	
Lone Grove Free Will Baptist Church		built NRHP-listed		Scipio Oklahoma	

=== Oregon ===
Church	Image	Dates	Location	City, State	Description
First Baptist Church (Ashland, Oregon)		built NRHP-listed		Ashland, Oregon	
First Baptist Church of Brownsville		built NRHP-listed		Brownsville, Oregon	
First Baptist Church (Dayton, Oregon)		built NRHP-listed		Dayton, Oregon	
Hugo Community Baptist Church		built NRHP-listed		Grants Pass, Oregon	
West Union Baptist Church		built NRHP-listed		West Union, Oregon	
Holgate Baptist Church (SBC)			11242 SE Holgate Blvd	Portland, OR 97266	
		built NRHP-listed			

=== Pennsylvania ===
Church	Image	Dates	Location	City, State	Description
Baptist Institute for Christian Workers		built NRHP-listed		Philadelphia, Pennsylvania	
Nugent Home for Baptists		built NRHP-listed		Philadelphia, Pennsylvania	
Allegheny Baptist Church		built NRHP-listed		Pleasantville, Pennsylvania	
Southampton Baptist Church and Cemetery		built NRHP-listed		Southampton, Pennsylvania	
Upland Baptist Church		built 1851		Upland, Pennsylvania	

=== Rhode Island ===
Church	Image	Dates	Location	City, State	Description
Baptist Church in Exeter		built 1838; NRHP-listed		Exeter, Rhode Island	
Narragansett Baptist Church		built 1850; NRHP-listed		Narragansett, Rhode Island	
Six Principle Baptist Church		built 1703; NRHP-listed		North Kingstown, Rhode Island	built circa 1703, may be the oldest Baptist church building in the U.S.
Calvary Baptist Church (Providence, Rhode Island)		built 1896; NRHP-listed		Providence, Rhode Island	
Congdon Street Baptist Church		built 1874-75; NRHP-listed		Providence, Rhode Island	
First Baptist Meetinghouse		built 1775; NRHP-listed		Providence, Rhode Island	oldest Baptist church congregation in the U.S., founded by Roger Williams in 1636, current meeting house dates from 1775
Harbor Church		built 1886		Block Island, Rhode Island	currently building was originally a Victorian hotel, but congregation dates to 1600s
West Greenwich Baptist Church and Cemetery		built 1822; NRHP-listed		West Greenwich Center, Rhode Island	
United Baptist Church (Newport, Rhode Island)		built 1846		Newport, Rhode Island	Second oldest Baptist congregation in America, founded in 1638-1644
Shiloh Church (Newport, Rhode Island)		built 1798; NRHP-listed		Newport, Rhode Island	
		built NRHP-listed			

=== South Carolina ===
Church	Image	Dates	Location	City, State	Description
Smyrna Baptist Church		built NRHP-listed		Allendale, South Carolina	
Bethlehem Baptist Church (Barnwell, South Carolina)		built NRHP-listed		Barnwell, South Carolina	
Central Baptist Church (Charleston, South Carolina)		built NRHP-listed		Charleston, South Carolina	
First Baptist Church (Columbia, South Carolina)		built NRHP-listed		Columbia, South Carolina	
Padgett's Creek Baptist Church		1844 built 1971 NRHP-listed	843 Olde Buncombe Road 34°37′30.162″N 81°44′42.18″W	Cross Keys, South Carolina	
First Baptist Church (Darlington, South Carolina)		built NRHP-listed		Darlington, South Carolina	
Good Hope Baptist Church		built NRHP-listed		Eastover, South Carolina	
Horn Creek Baptist Church		built NRHP-listed		Edgefield, South Carolina	
Edisto Island Baptist Church		built NRHP-listed		Edisto Island, South Carolina	
Gillisonville Baptist Church		built NRHP-listed		Gillisonville, South Carolina	
Downtown Baptist Church		built NRHP-listed		Greenville, South Carolina	
Little River Baptist Church		built NRHP-listed		Jenkinsville, South Carolina	
Unity Baptist Church		built NRHP-listed		Kershaw, South Carolina	
Catfish Creek Baptist Church		built NRHP-listed		Latta, South Carolina	
Mt. Olive Baptist Church		built NRHP-listed		Mullins, South Carolina	
Mt. Pisgah Baptist Church		built NRHP-listed		Orangeburg, South Carolina	
Oolenoy Baptist Church Cemetery		built NRHP-listed		Pickens, South Carolina	
Robertville Baptist Church		built NRHP-listed		Robertville, South Carolina	
Mount Prospect Baptist Church		built NRHP-listed		Rock Hill, South Carolina	
Simpsonville Baptist Church		built NRHP-listed		Simpsonville, South Carolina	
Corinth Baptist Church		built NRHP-listed		Union, South Carolina	
		built NRHP-listed			

=== South Dakota ===
Church	Image	Dates	Location	City, State	Description
Ipswich Baptist Church		1924 built 1978 NRHP-listed	Main St. and 3rd Ave. 45°26′41″N 99°1′32″W	Ipswich, South Dakota	Gothic Revival
First Scandinavian Baptist Church		1888 built 2000 NRHP-listed	43°52′15″N 96°38′41″W	Trent, South Dakota	Country church
First Baptist Church of Vermillion		1925 built 1982 NRHP-listed	101 E. Main St. 42°46′44″N 96°55′49″W	Vermillion, South Dakota	Richardsonian Romanesque

=== Tennessee ===
Church	Image	Dates	Location	City, State	Description
Beesley Primitive Baptist Church		built NRHP-listed		Murfreesboro, Tennessee	
Baptist Female College-Adams House		built NRHP-listed		Woodbury, Tennessee	
Ogburn Chapel Missionary Baptist Church		Founded 1865		Clarksville, TN	

There are many more NRHP-listed and other Baptist churches in Tennessee.

=== Texas ===
Church	Image	Dates	Location	City, State	Description
First Baptist Church (Amarillo, Texas)		built NRHP-listed		Amarillo, Texas	
University Baptist Church (Austin, Texas)		built NRHP-listed		Austin, Texas	
Macedonia Baptist Church (Cuero, Texas)		1890 built 1988 NRHP-listed	512 S. Indianola; 29°5′12″N 97°17′54″W	Cuero, Texas	
Saint James Second Street Baptist Church		1913 built 1999 NRHP-listed	210 Harding St. 32°45′34″N 97°19′28″W	Fort Worth, Texas	Late Victorian
Tabernacle Baptist Church		built NRHP-listed		Fort Worth, Texas	
Antioch Missionary Baptist Church		1875 built 1976 NRHP-listed	313 Robin Street; 29°45′20″N 95°21′54″W	Houston, Texas	
Bethel Baptist Church (Houston, Texas)		built NRHP-listed		Houston, Texas	
St. Paul's Baptist Church		built NRHP-listed		Paris, Texas	
Prospect Hill Missionary Baptist Church		built NRHP-listed		San Antonio, Texas	
First Baptist Church (Stamford, Texas)		built NRHP-listed		Stamford, Texas	
		built NRHP-listed			
Harmony Hill Baptist Church		Founded; 1913	2708 S. Chestnut St.	Lufkin, Texas	

=== Utah ===
Church	Image	Dates	Location	City, State	Description
Magna Community Baptist Church		1924 built 1986 NRHP-listed	2908 S. Eight Thousand Nine Hundred W 40°42′26″N 112°6′13″W	Magna, Utah	
Immanuel Baptist Church (Salt Lake City, Utah)		1910 built 1978 NRHP-listed	401 E. 200 South; 40°46′4″N 111°53′0″W	Salt Lake City, Utah	Classical Revival

=== Vermont ===
Church	Image	Dates	Location	City, State	Description
Addison Baptist Church		1816 built 1978 NRHP-listed	44°5′18.21″N 73°18′10.71″W	Addison, Vermont	
Italian Baptist Church		1906 built 1975 NRHP-listed	10 N. Brook St. 44°12′13″N 72°30′34″W	Barre, Vermont	Renaissance
First Baptist Church (Burlington, Vermont)		1864 built 2001 NRHP-listed	81 St. Paul St. 44°28′40″N 73°12′52″W	Burlington, Vermont	Italianate
Georgia Plain Baptist Church		1877 built 2001 NRHP-listed	Stonebridge Rd. and Georgia Plain Rd. 44°43′15″N 73°10′2″W	Georgia, Vermont	Gothic Revival
Monkton Borough Baptist Church		1811 built 1989 NRHP-listed	Town Hwy. 1; 44°13′55″N 73°8′13″W	Monkton, Vermont	Greek Revival, Federal
West Haven Baptist Church		1831 built 2007 NRHP-listed	48 Book Rd. 43°39′2″N 73°20′53″W	West Haven, Vermont	Federal, Gothic Revival
		built NRHP-listed			

=== Virginia ===
Church	Image	Dates	Location	City, State	Description
Mount Zion Old School Baptist Church-VDHR 53-339		built NRHP-listed		Aldie, Virginia	
Alfred Street Baptist Church		1818 built 2004 NRHP-listed	313 S. Alfred Street; 38°48′16″N 77°3′0″W	Alexandria, Virginia	Mid 19th Century Revival architecture
Beulah Baptist Church		built NRHP-listed		Alexandria, Virginia	
Ebenezer Baptist Churches		built NRHP-listed		Bloomfield, Virginia	
Mount Zion Baptist Church (Charlottesville, Virginia)		built NRHP-listed		Charlottesville, Virginia	
Delevan Baptist Church		built NRHP-listed		Charlottesville, Virginia	
First Baptist Church of Covington, Virginia		built NRHP-listed		Covington, Virginia	
Big Spring Baptist Church		built NRHP-listed		Elliston, Virginia	
Flint Hill Baptist Church		built NRHP-listed		Flint Hill, Virginia	
Zion Poplars Baptist Church		built NRHP-listed		Gloucester, Virginia	
Coan Baptist Church		built NRHP-listed		Heathsville, Virginia	
First Baptist Church (Lexington, Virginia)		1896 built 2006 NRHP-listed	103 N. Main St. 37°47′10″N 79°26′26″W	Lexington, Virginia	
First Baptist Church (Lynchburg, Virginia)		built NRHP-listed		Lynchburg, Virginia	
Court Street Baptist Church		built NRHP-listed		Lynchburg, Virginia	
Massaponax Baptist Church		built NRHP-listed		Massaponax, Virginia	
Bethel Baptist Church (Midlothian, Virginia)		built NRHP-listed		Midlothian, Virginia	
Montgomery Primitive Baptist Church		built NRHP-listed		Merrimac, Virginia	
Olive Branch Missionary Baptist Church		built NRHP-listed		Moneta, Virginia	
First Baptist Church-Newport News		built NRHP-listed		Newport News, Virginia	
First Baptist Church (Norfolk, Virginia)		built NRHP-listed		Norfolk, Virginia	
First Calvary Baptist Church		built NRHP-listed		Norfolk, Virginia	
Freemason Street Baptist Church		built NRHP-listed		Norfolk, Virginia	
Queen Street Baptist Church		built NRHP-listed		Norfolk, Virginia	
Emmaus Baptist Church		built NRHP-listed		Providence Forge, Virginia	
First Baptist Church (Richmond, Virginia)		built NRHP-listed		Richmond, Virginia	
Fourth Baptist Church		built NRHP-listed		Richmond, Virginia	
Leigh Street Baptist Church		built NRHP-listed		Richmond, Virginia	
First African Baptist Church (Richmond, Virginia)		built NRHP-listed		Richmond, Virginia	
Sixth Mount Zion Baptist Church		built NRHP-listed		Richmond, Virginia	
Mount Moriah Baptist Church and Cemetery		built NRHP-listed		Roanoke, Virginia	
Ketoctin Baptist Church		built NRHP-listed		Round Hill, Virginia	
Mount Sinai Baptist Church		built NRHP-listed		Suffolk, Virginia	
Mount Salem Baptist Meetinghouse		built NRHP-listed		Washington, Virginia	
		built NRHP-listed			

=== Washington ===
Church	Image	Dates	Location	City, State	Description
Chinese Baptist Church		1922 built 1986 NRHP-listed		Seattle, Washington	
Grace Baptist Church (Spokane, Washington)		1905 built 1992 NRHP-listed		Spokane, Washington	
First Baptist Church (Yakima, Washington)		built 2016 NRHP-listed	515 E. Yakima Avenue; 46°36′15.11″N 120°29′55.98″W	Yakima, Washington	

=== West Virginia ===
Church	Image	Dates	Location	City, State	Description
Charleston Baptist Temple		1924 built 2000 NRHP-listed	38°20′43″N 81°37′44″W	Charleston, West Virginia	Georgian- and Federal-style church designed by Ernest Flagg
Mt. Tabor Baptist Church		1832 built 1976 NRHP-listed	37°48′6.5″N 80°26′50″W	Lewisburg, West Virginia	Gothic style church
Mount Zion Baptist Church (Martinsburg, West Virginia)		1836-38 built 1980 NRHP-listed	Opequon Lane; 39°23′19″N 77°55′25″W	Martinsburg, West Virginia	Has stonework "unequalled" in Berkeley County
First Baptist Church (Parkersburg, West Virginia)		1871 built 1982 NRHP-listed	813 Market Street; 39°16′4″N 81°33′24″W	Parkersburg, West Virginia	Church of congregation founded in 1817; replaced 1837-built church on the site.
St. Paul Baptist Church (St. Albans, West Virginia)		1921 built 1998 NRHP-listed	821 B St. 38°23′4″N 81°50′20″W	St. Albans, West Virginia	Late Gothic Revival style

=== Wisconsin ===
Church	Image	Dates	Location	City, State	Description
First Baptist Church of Fond du Lac		built NRHP-listed		Fond du Lac, Wisconsin	
Freewill Baptist Church		built NRHP-listed		New Berlin, Wisconsin	
First Baptist Church (Osceola, Wisconsin)		built NRHP-listed		Osceola, Wisconsin	
Baptist Church (Ripon, Wisconsin)		built NRHP-listed		Ripon, Wisconsin	
First Baptist Church (Waukesha, Wisconsin)		built NRHP-listed		Waukesha, Wisconsin	
Seventh Day Baptist Church in Milton		1934 built 2016 NRHP-listed		Milton, Wisconsin	Architect Hugo Haeuser Architectural style Gothic Revival NRHP reference No.16000569

== Malaysia ==
- D'Gap Baptist Church Located in Kota Kinabalu, Sabah, Malaysia.

== South Africa ==
Church	Image	Dates	Location	City, County	Description
Baptist Church, Troyeville		1897 founded; 1909 current building	26.20108°S 28.06721°E	Troyeville	Oldest Baptist church in South Africa.

== Other Baptist related entities and buildings ==
Church	Image	Dates	Location	City, State	Description
Crozer Building, headquarters of the American Baptist Publication Society		built NRHP-listed	1420-22 Chestnut St.	Philadelphia, Pennsylvania	
Baptist Parsonage		built NRHP-listed		Kinston, North Carolina	
Old Baptist Parsonage		built NRHP-listed		Wellington, Ohio	

== Primitive Baptist churches ==
There are several Primitive Baptist churches in the U.S.
