= West Baptist Church =

Historic church in Ohio, United States

- U.S. National Register of Historic Places
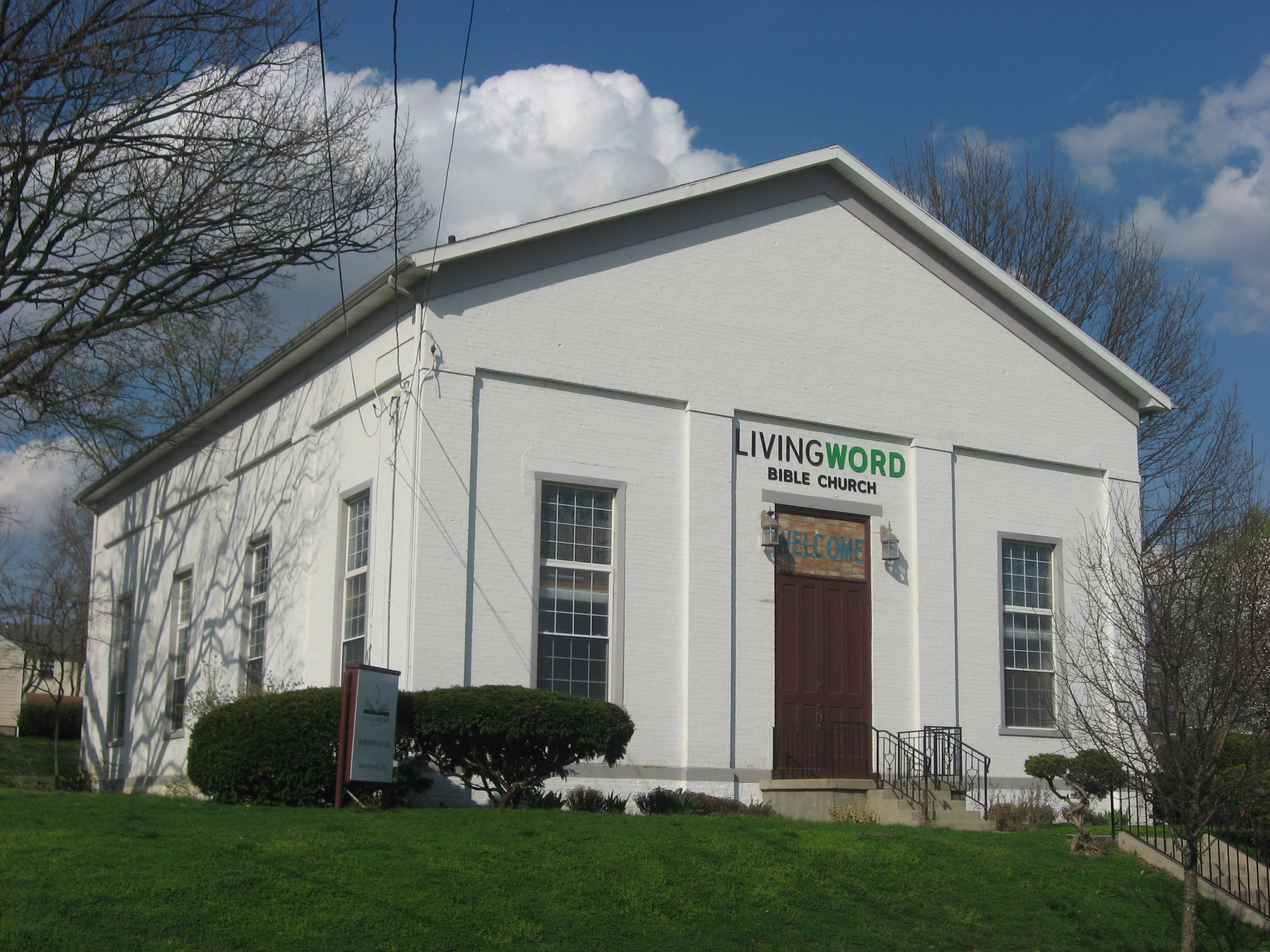
- Front and western side of the church

- Location within Ohio Location within the United States
- Location: 500 W. Mulberry St., Lebanon, Ohio
- Coordinates: 39°26′6″N 84°12′51″W
- Area: less than one acre
- Built: 1860
- Architectural style: Greek Revival
- MPS: Lebanon MRA
- NRHP reference No.: 84000161
- Added to NRHP: October 18, 1984

West Baptist Church (Bible Church of God; Old School; Hardshell Baptist Church) is a historic church building at 500 W. Mulberry Street in Lebanon, Ohio.

The Greek Revival building was constructed in 1860 and added to the National Register of Historic Places in 1984.
