= Salem's Baptist Church =

Historic church in Indiana, United States

- U.S. National Register of Historic Places
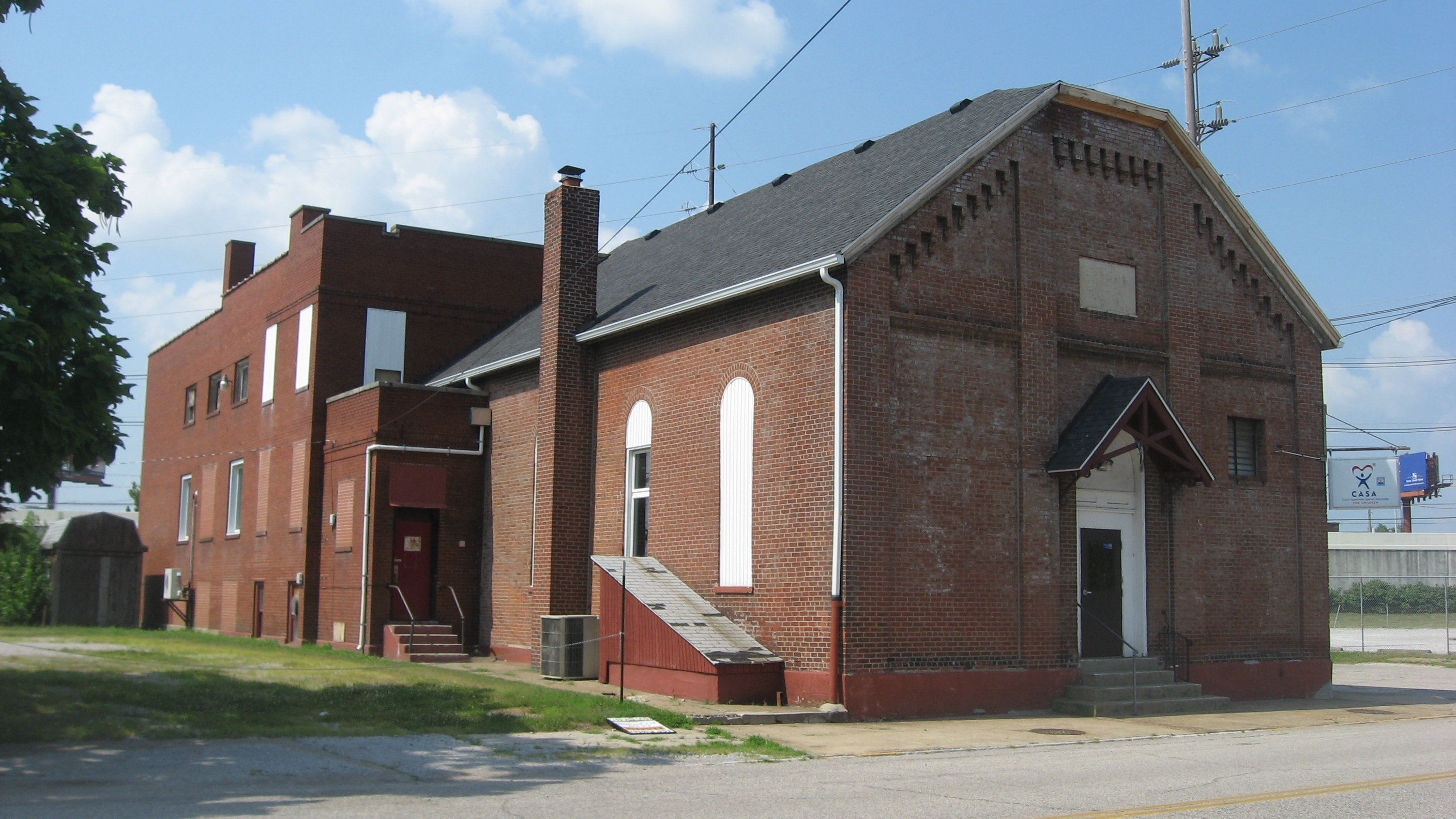
- Front and side of the church

- Location within Indiana Location within the United States
- Location: 728 Court St., Evansville, Indiana
- Coordinates: 37°58′34″N 87°34′9″W
- Area: less than one acre
- Built: 1873
- Architectural style: Prairie School
- MPS: Downtown Evansville MRA
- NRHP reference No.: 82000121
- Added to NRHP: July 01, 1982

Salem's Baptist Church is a historic Baptist church located at 728 Court Street in downtown Evansville, Indiana. It was built in 1873, and is representative of Prairie School architecture.

It was listed on the National Register of Historic Places in 1982.
