= Duanesburg-Florida Baptist Church =

Historic church in New York, United States

- U.S. National Register of Historic Places
- Location within New York Location within the United States
- Location: NY 30, Duanesburg, New York
- Coordinates: 42°48′31″N 74°12′58″W
- Area: 1.9 acres (0.77 ha)
- Built: 1868
- Architect: Wilmot, A.
- Architectural style: Greek Revival, Late Victorian, Vernacular Greek Revival
- MPS: Duanesburg MRA
- NRHP reference No.: 84003185
- Added to NRHP: October 11, 1984

Duanesburg-Florida Baptist Church is a historic Baptist church on NY 30 in Duanesburg, Schenectady County, New York. It was built between 1868 and 1869 and is a three-by-four-bay frame building with a gable roof in a vernacular Greek Revival style. It features an engaged central square tower with a pyramidal roof erected as part of the front facade in 1891. Also on the property is a contributing church hall dated to about 1913.

The property was covered in a 1984 study of Duanesburg historical resources. It was listed on the National Register of Historic Places in 1984.
