= Mars Hill Baptist Church =

Historic church in North Carolina, United States

- U.S. National Register of Historic Places
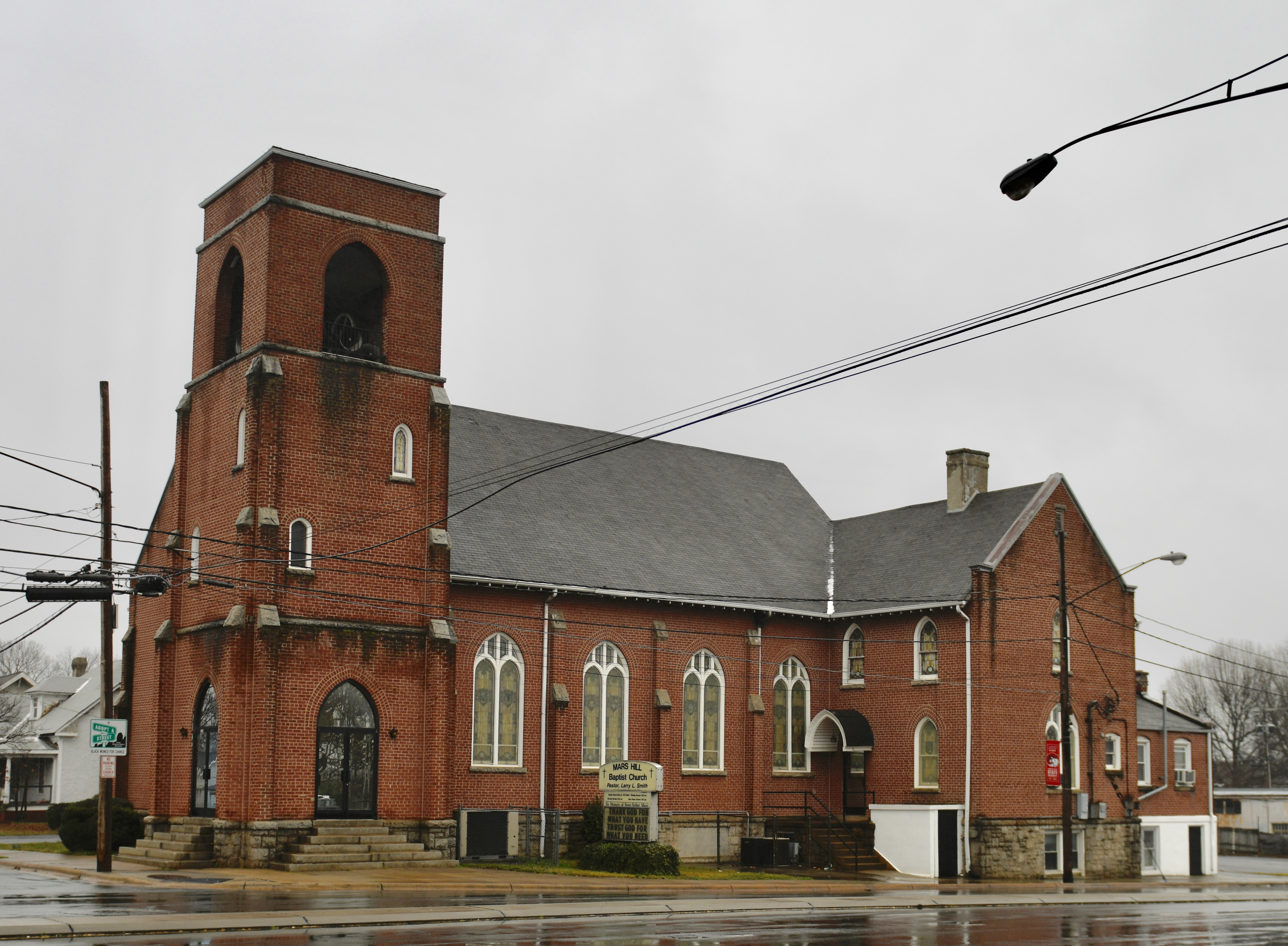

- Location within North Carolina Location within the United States
- Location: 1331 E. Fourth St. Winston-Salem, North Carolina
- Coordinates: 36°5′58″N 80°13′46″W
- Area: less than one acre
- Built: 1915
- Architectural style: Late Gothic Revival, Queen Anne
- MPS: African-American Neighborhoods in Northeastern Winston-Salem MPS
- NRHP reference No.: 99000061
- Added to NRHP: January 27, 1999

Mars Hill Baptist Church, also known as Fries Memorial Moravian Church, is a historic African-American Baptist church. It is located at Winston-Salem, Forsyth County, North Carolina, and was built in 1915. It is a T-shaped brick building with corner tower in the Gothic Revival style. Also on the property is the parsonage; a one-story, pebble-dash finished Queen Anne-style dwelling. It has a high hipped roof, a central hipped dormer, and a hipped-roof full-front porch supported by fluted columns. It was originally built for a white Moravian congregation, until the Mars Hill Baptist Church congregation purchased the building in 1944 for $4,000.

It was listed on the National Register of Historic Places in 1999.
