= Mount Zion Baptist Church (Salisbury, North Carolina) =

Historic church in North Carolina, United States

- U.S. National Register of Historic Places
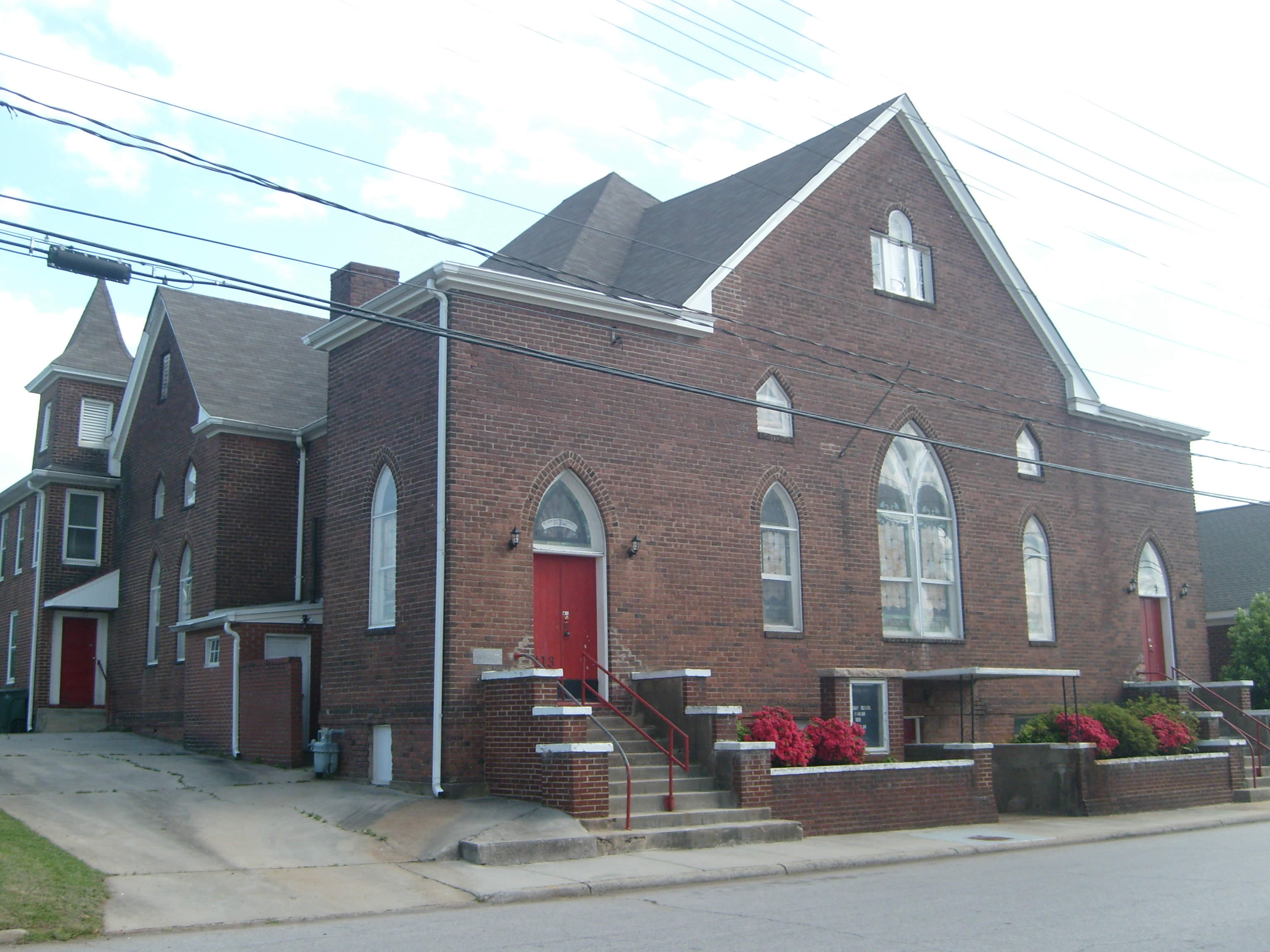

- Location within North Carolina Location within the United States
- Location: 413 N. Church St., Salisbury, North Carolina
- Coordinates: 35°40′15″N 80°28′2″W
- Area: less than one acre
- Built: 1907
- Architectural style: Gothic Revival
- NRHP reference No.: 85003188
- Added to NRHP: December 30, 1985

Mount Zion Baptist Church is a historic African-American Baptist church located at 413 N. Church Street in Salisbury, Rowan County, North Carolina. The sanctuary was built in 1907, and is a red brick Gothic Revival-style building. It features stained glass lancet windows and small triangular shaped windows and former towers capped by octagonal conical roofs. A brick-veneered educational/manse wing added between 1913 and 1920.

It was listed on the National Register of Historic Places in 1985.
