= Gravel Hill Baptist Church =

Historic church in Arkansas, United States

- U.S. National Register of Historic Places
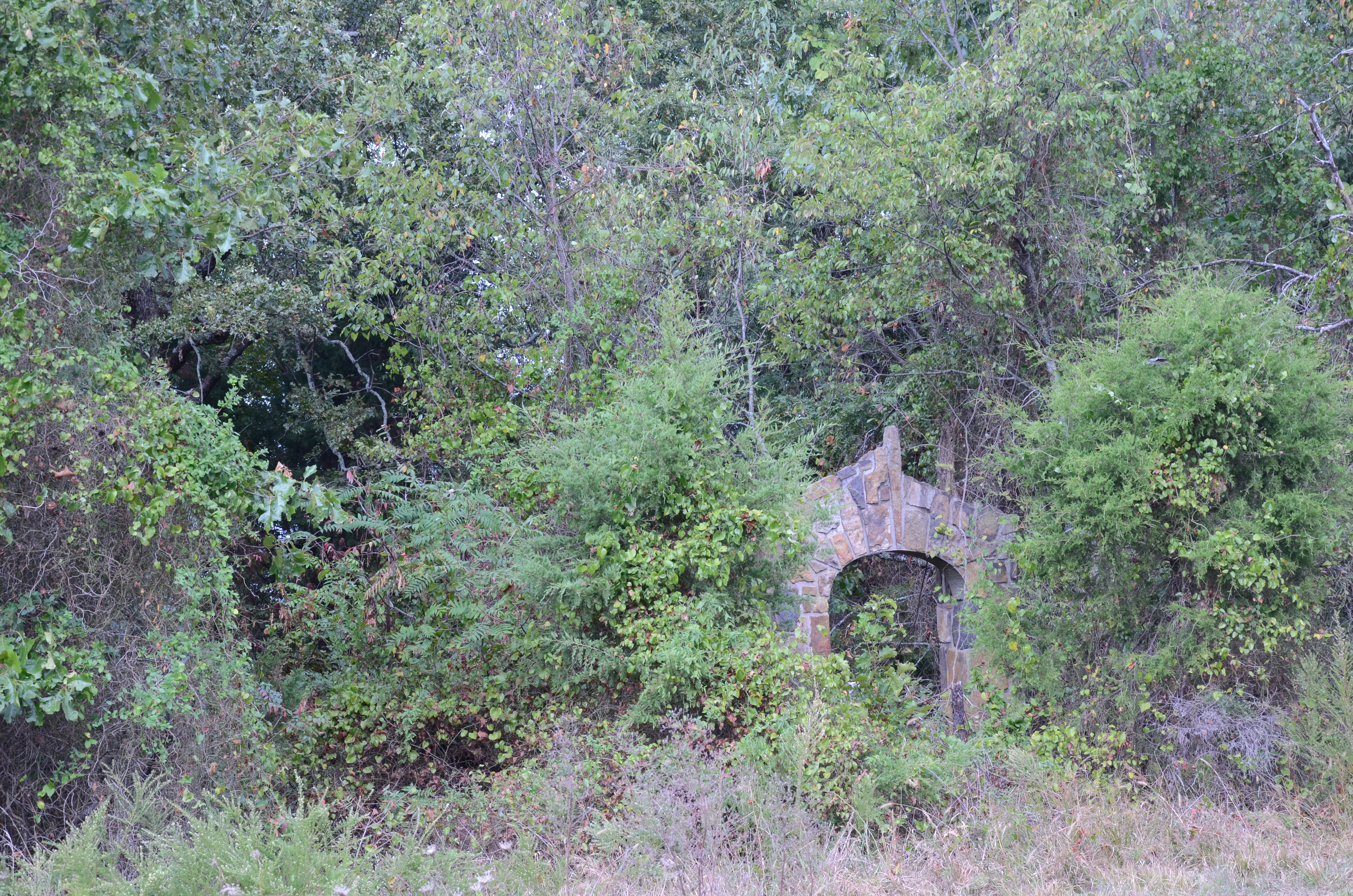
- All that remains of the Gravel Hill Baptist Church

- Location within Arkansas Location within the United States
- Location: Gravel Hill Road, Gravel Hill, Arkansas
- Coordinates: 35°14′56″N 91°58′40″W
- Area: less than one acre
- Built: 1935
- Architectural style: NPS Rustic architecture
- MPS: White County MPS
- NRHP reference No.: 91001323
- Added to NRHP: July 21, 1992

The Gravel Hill Baptist Church was a historic church on Gravel Hill Road in rural western White County, Arkansas, United States of America. It was located on Gravel Hill Road in the community of Gravel Hill, south of County Road 26 and west of Searcy. It was a single-story fieldstone structure, built in the Rustic or National Park style. It had a front-facing gable roof, with exposed rafter ends in the Craftsman style, and had a gable roofed entrance porch. The church was built in 1935, and was the only building of its type in the area.

The building was listed on the National Register of Historic Places in 1992. It has been listed as destroyed in the Arkansas Historic Preservation Program database.

== See also ==
- National Register of Historic Places listings in White County, Arkansas
