= Mount Zion Baptist Church (Little Rock, Arkansas) =

Historic church in Arkansas, United States

- U.S. National Register of Historic Places
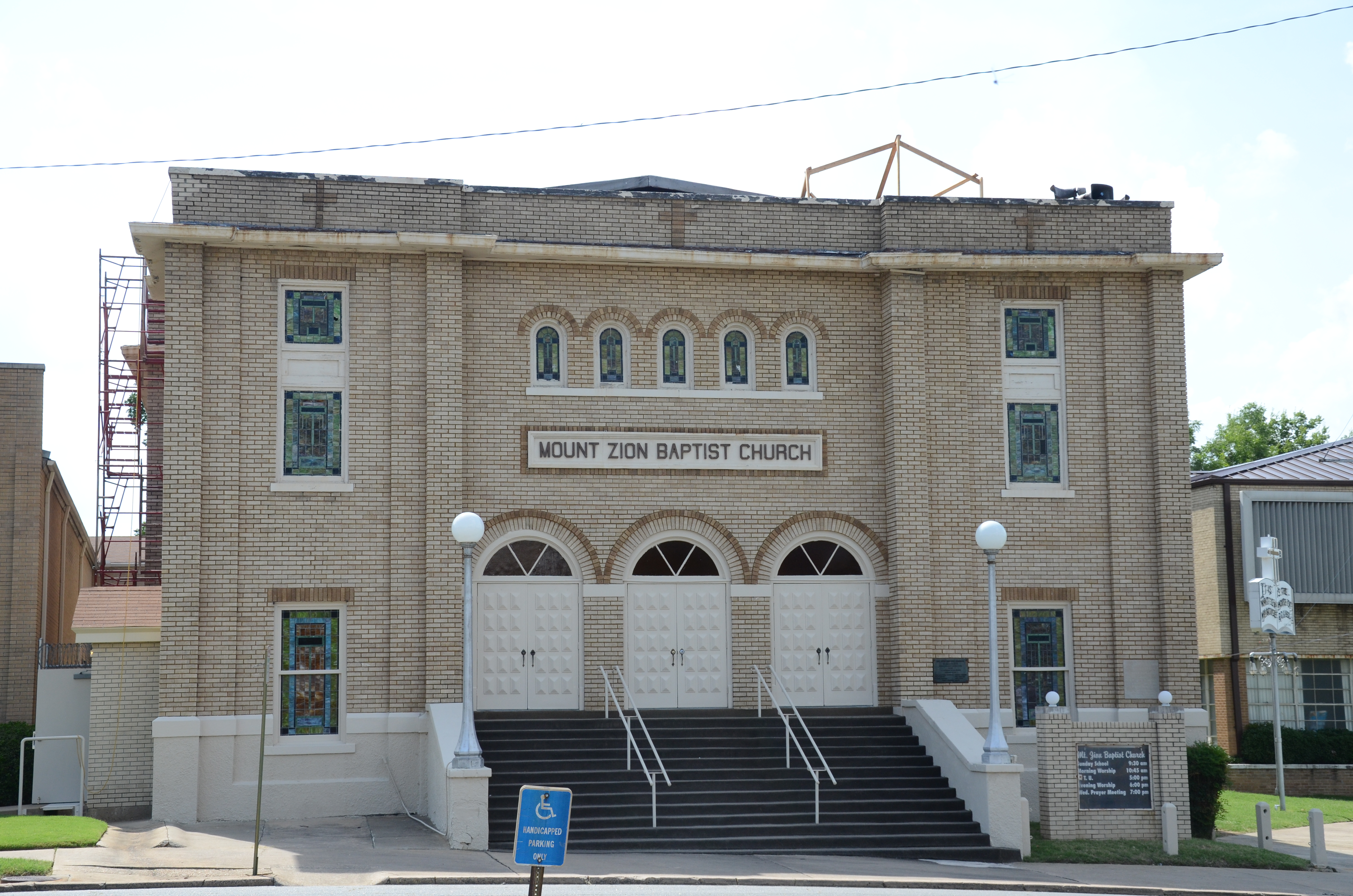

- Location within Arkansas Location within the United States
- Location: 900 Cross St., Little Rock, Arkansas
- Coordinates: 34°44′30″N 92°17′7″W
- Area: less than one acre
- Built: 1926
- Built by: P.S. Jones
- Architectural style: Prairie School
- NRHP reference No.: 86003230
- Added to NRHP: March 27, 1987

Mount Zion Baptist Church is a historic church at 900 Cross Street in Little Rock, Arkansas. It is a buff brick structure with modest Prairie School features on its exterior, with a three-part facade articulated by brick pilasters, and a trio of entrances set in the center section above a raised basement. The interior of the church is extremely elaborate in its decoration, with a pressed-metal ceiling, elaborate central copper light fixture, and banks of stained glass windows. The church was built in 1926 for a predominantly African-American congregation founded in 1877.

The building was listed on the National Register of Historic Places in 1987.

== See also ==
- National Register of Historic Places listings in Little Rock, Arkansas
