= Mount Prospect Baptist Church =

Historic church in South Carolina, United States

- U.S. National Register of Historic Places
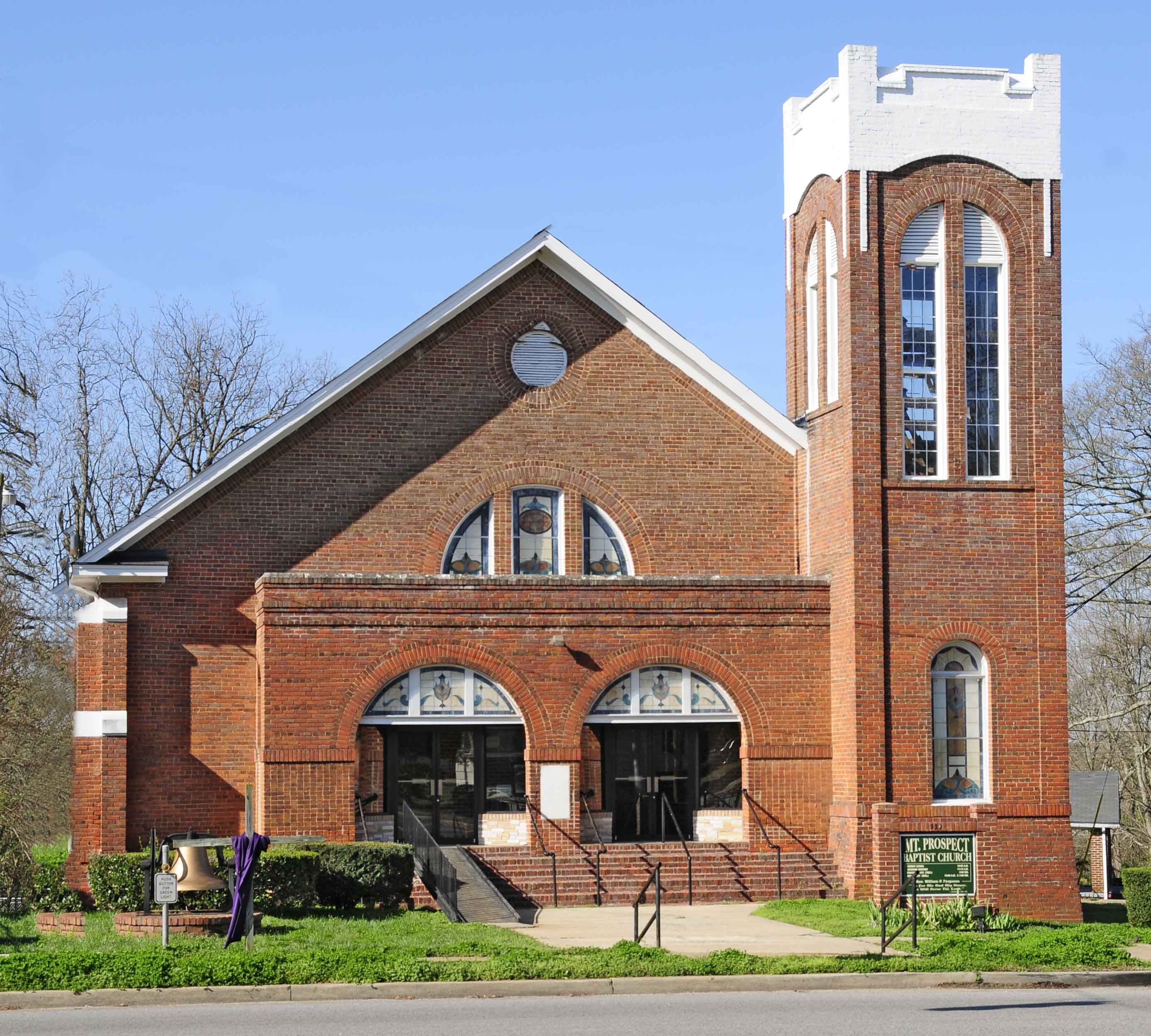

- Location within South Carolina Location within the United States
- Location: 339 W. Black St., Rock Hill, South Carolina
- Coordinates: 34°55′45″N 81°2′8″W
- Area: less than one acre
- Built: 1915
- Architectural style: Romanesque
- MPS: Rock Hill MPS
- NRHP reference No.: 92000656
- Added to NRHP: June 10, 1992

Mount Prospect Baptist Church is a historic church at 339 W. Black Street in Rock Hill, South Carolina.

It was built in 1915 and added to the National Register in 1992.
