= St. Paul Missionary Baptist Church =

Historic church in Idaho, United States

- St Paul Missionary Baptist Church
- U.S. National Register of Historic Places
- Location within Idaho Location within the United States
- Location: 124 Broadway Ave., Boise, Idaho
- Coordinates: 43°36′37″N 116°11′31″W
- Area: less than one acre
- Built: 1921
- Built by: Baptist Church Congregation
- Architectural style: Bungalow/American craftsman
- NRHP reference No.: 82000247
- Added to NRHP: October 29, 1982

The St. Paul Missionary Baptist Church in Boise, Idaho is a historic Baptist church founded in 1909, and its building at 124 Broadway Avenue which was built in 1921. The building was added to the National Register of Historic Places in 1982.

In 1982 it was deemed "historically significant as one of two churches still in existence in Idaho with a predominantly black congregation", when the congregation was about 150. The church was built by church members, including William Riley Hardy, its first pastor. It is described as "a vernacular structure with bungalow elements."
