= Prospect Hill Missionary Baptist Church =

Historic church in Texas, United States

- U.S. National Register of Historic Places
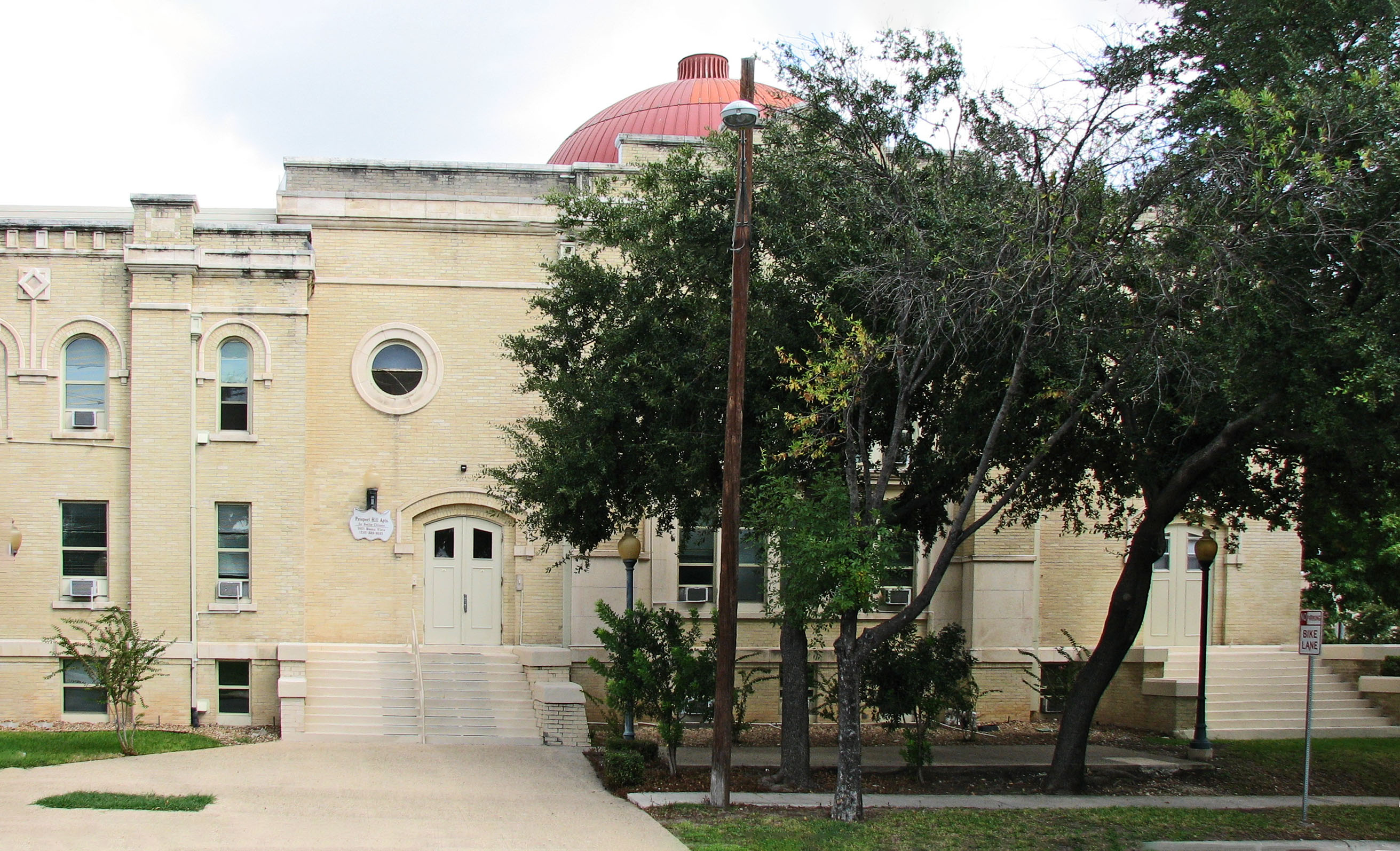

- Location within Texas Location within the United States
- Location: 1601 Buena Vista, San Antonio, Texas
- Coordinates: 29°25′34″N 98°30′19″W
- Area: less than one acre
- Built: 1911
- Architect: Harker, Henry J.; Evans, Arthur A.
- Architectural style: Beaux Arts
- NRHP reference No.: 86002185
- Added to NRHP: September 18, 1986

Prospect Hill Missionary Baptist Church (Prospect Hill Baptist Church) is a historic Baptist church building at 1601 Buena Vista in San Antonio, Texas.

The Beaux Arts style building was constructed in 1911 and added to the National Register of Historic Places in 1986.
