= Swedish Baptist Church (Davenport, Iowa) =

- U.S. National Register of Historic Places
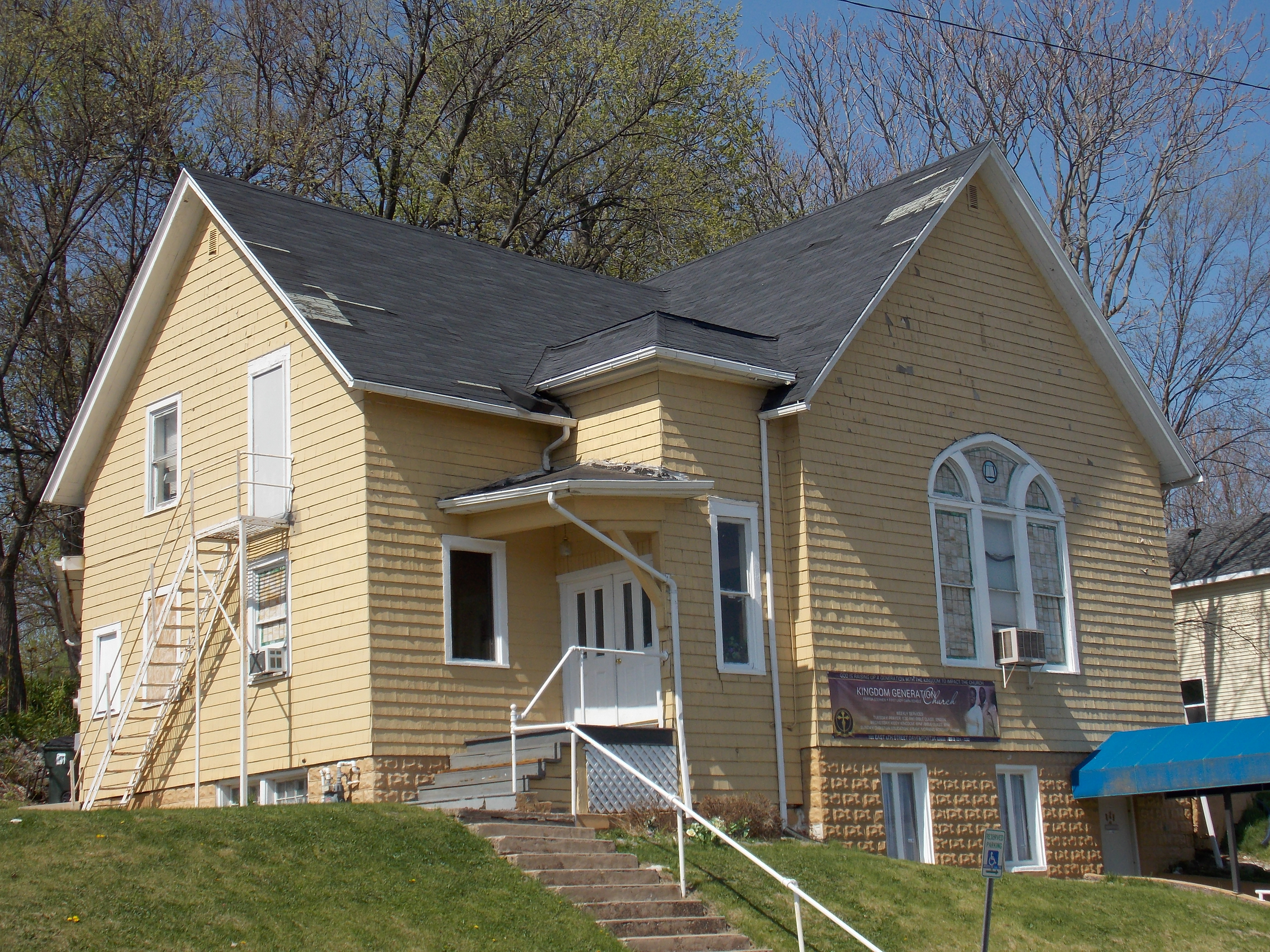
- The church building in 2015

- Location within Iowa Location within the United States
- Location: 700 East 6th Street; Davenport, Iowa
- Coordinates: 41°31′36″N 90°33′51″W
- Area: 1 acre (0.40 ha)
- MPS: Davenport MRA
- NRHP reference No.: 83002515
- Added to NRHP: July 7, 1983

The former Swedish Baptist Church is a historic building located on the east side of Davenport, Iowa, United States. The congregation was organized in 1883 in the city's Swedish neighborhood and included about 50 people. The building was originally a Presbyterian Church and was moved here from its original location at Eleventh and Scott Streets. In the 1920s it became Second Baptist Church and by the 1930s it was renamed Grand Avenue Baptist Church. The building subsequently housed other denominations, including the Mennonites, and now houses Kingdom Generation Church.

The church building is a simple frame building with Greek Revival and Romanesque Revival elements. The structure is more typical of 19th century rural and small-town Iowa Protestant churches rather than those found in an urban center. It was listed on the National Register of Historic Places in 1983.

The church later became Greater Praise Temple, Pastored by then-Pastor Stephen Echols.
