= First Calvary Baptist Church =

Historic church in Virginia, US

- U.S. National Register of Historic Places
- Virginia Landmarks Register
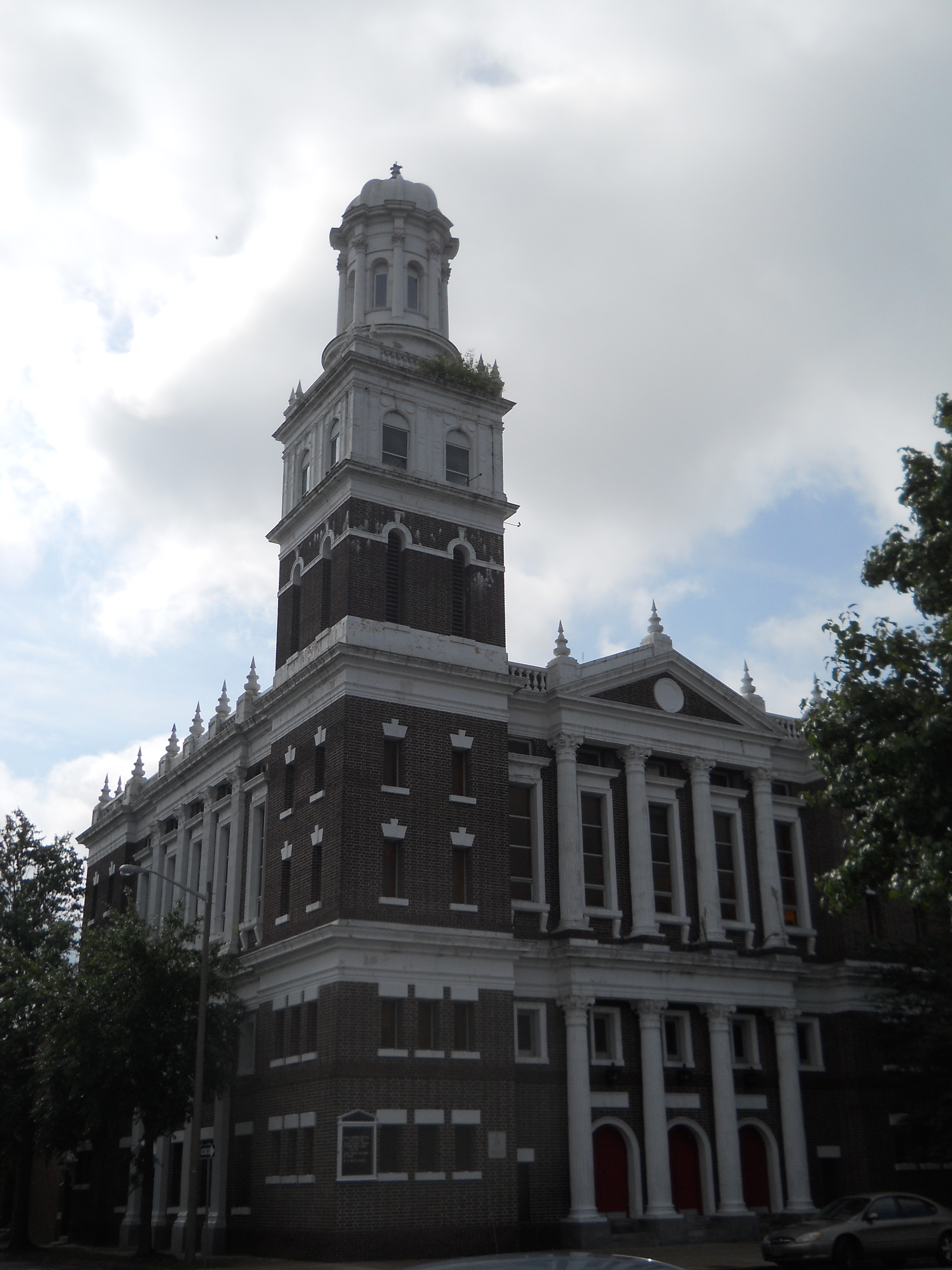
- First Calvary Baptist Church, September 2013

- Location within Virginia Location within the United States
- Location: 1036-1040 Wide St., Norfolk, Virginia
- Coordinates: 36°51′22″N 76°16′41″W
- Area: 0.5 acres (0.20 ha)
- Built: 1915-1916
- Architect: Mitchell & Wilcox
- Architectural style: Late 19th And 20th Century Revivals, Second Renaissance Revival
- NRHP reference No.: 87001853
- VLR No.: 122-0073

Significant dates
- Added to NRHP: October 15, 1987
- Designated VLR: June 17, 1987

First Calvary Baptist Church is a historic African-American Baptist church located in Norfolk, Virginia. It was built in 1915 and 1916 and is a four-story, 11 bay, brick church building in the Second Renaissance Revival style. The building features decorative terra cotta and a stained-glass dome. It has a two-tier, engaged entrance portico with fluted columns, Corinthian order capitals, and terra cotta entablatures. The building also has a three-stage bell tower.

It was listed on the National Register of Historic Places in 1987.
