= Baptist Church (Ripon, Wisconsin) =

Historic church in Wisconsin, United States

- U.S. National Register of Historic Places
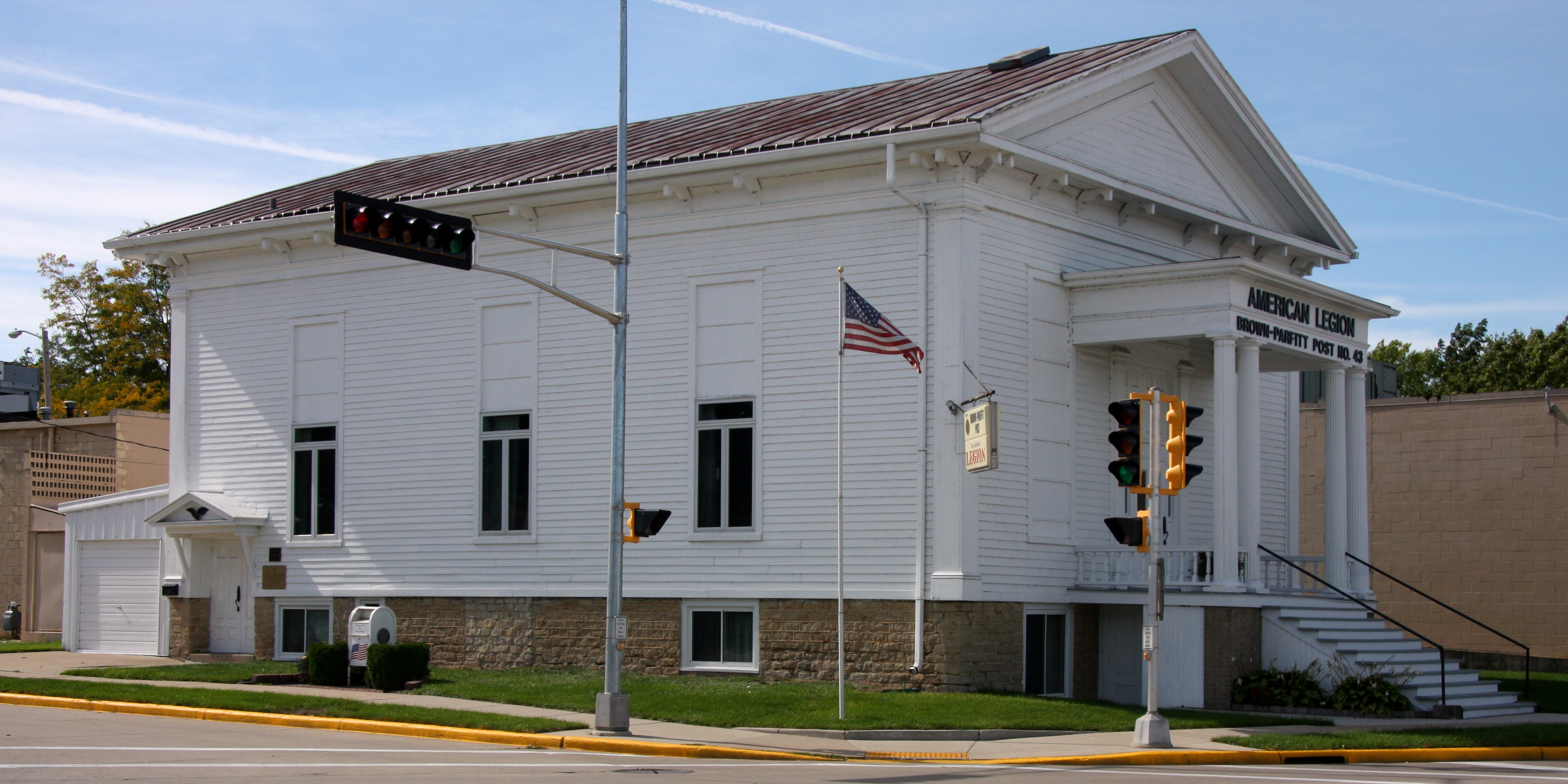
- Location: 133 East Fond du Lac St. Ripon, Wisconsin
- Coordinates: 43.84212°N 88.83735°W
- Built: 1857
- NRHP reference No.: 07000237
- Added to NRHP: March 29, 2007

The Ripon Baptist Church is located in Ripon, Wisconsin. It was added to the National Register of Historic Places for its architectural significance in 2007.
