= Himrod Baptist Church =

Historic church in New York, United States

- U.S. National Register of Historic Places
- Location within New York Location within the United States
- Location: Himrod Rd., Milo, New York
- Coordinates: 42°35′22″N 76°57′17″W
- Area: less than one acre
- Built: 1833
- Architectural style: Greek Revival
- MPS: Yates County MPS
- NRHP reference No.: 94000940
- Added to NRHP: August 24, 1994

Himrod Baptist Church, also known as First Baptist Church of Milo, is a historic Baptist church located at Milo in Yates County, New York. It is a Greek Revival style structure built about 1833.

It was listed on the National Register of Historic Places in 1994.
