= Irving Baptist Church =

Historic church in Oklahoma, United States

- U.S. National Register of Historic Places
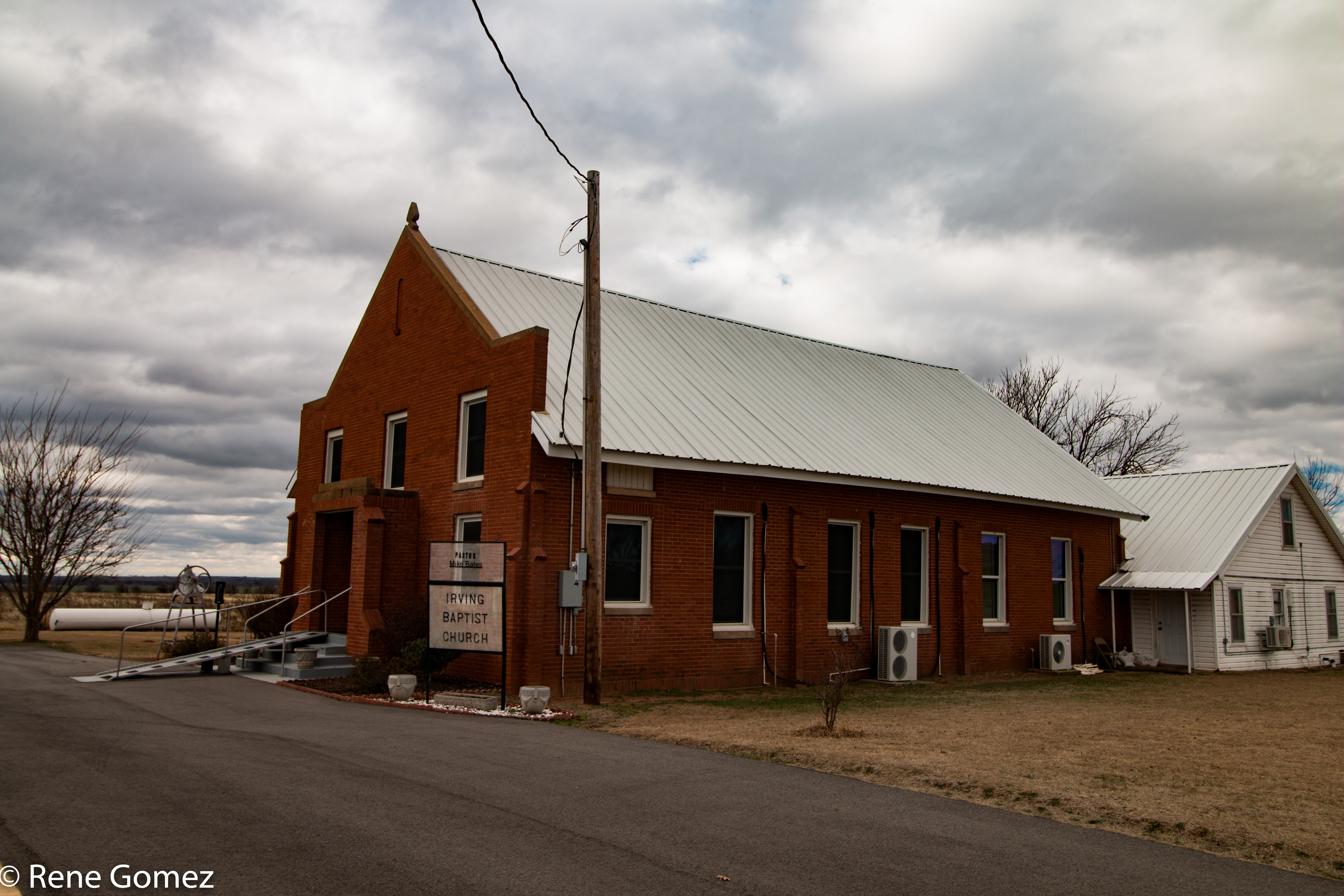

- Location within Oklahoma Location within the United States
- Location: Corner of E2050 Rd. and N2770 Rd., Ryan, Oklahoma
- Coordinates: 34.04155°N 98.05272°W
- Area: 1 acre (0.40 ha)
- Built: 1928
- Architectural style: Gothic Revival
- NRHP reference No.: 09000977
- Added to NRHP: December 3, 2009

The Irving Baptist Church is a historic Baptist church in Ryan, Oklahoma. It was built in 1928 and added to the National Register of Historic Places in 2009. The building has some elements of Gothic Revival architecture.

The first wedding in the church was on April 1, 1934, the marriage of Una Ellie Smith (1912-2014) and Russell Harris.

According to a business directory, the current church entity was created in 2005 and has five employees.
