= First Baptist Church of Moffat =

Historic church in Colorado, United States

- U.S. National Register of Historic Places
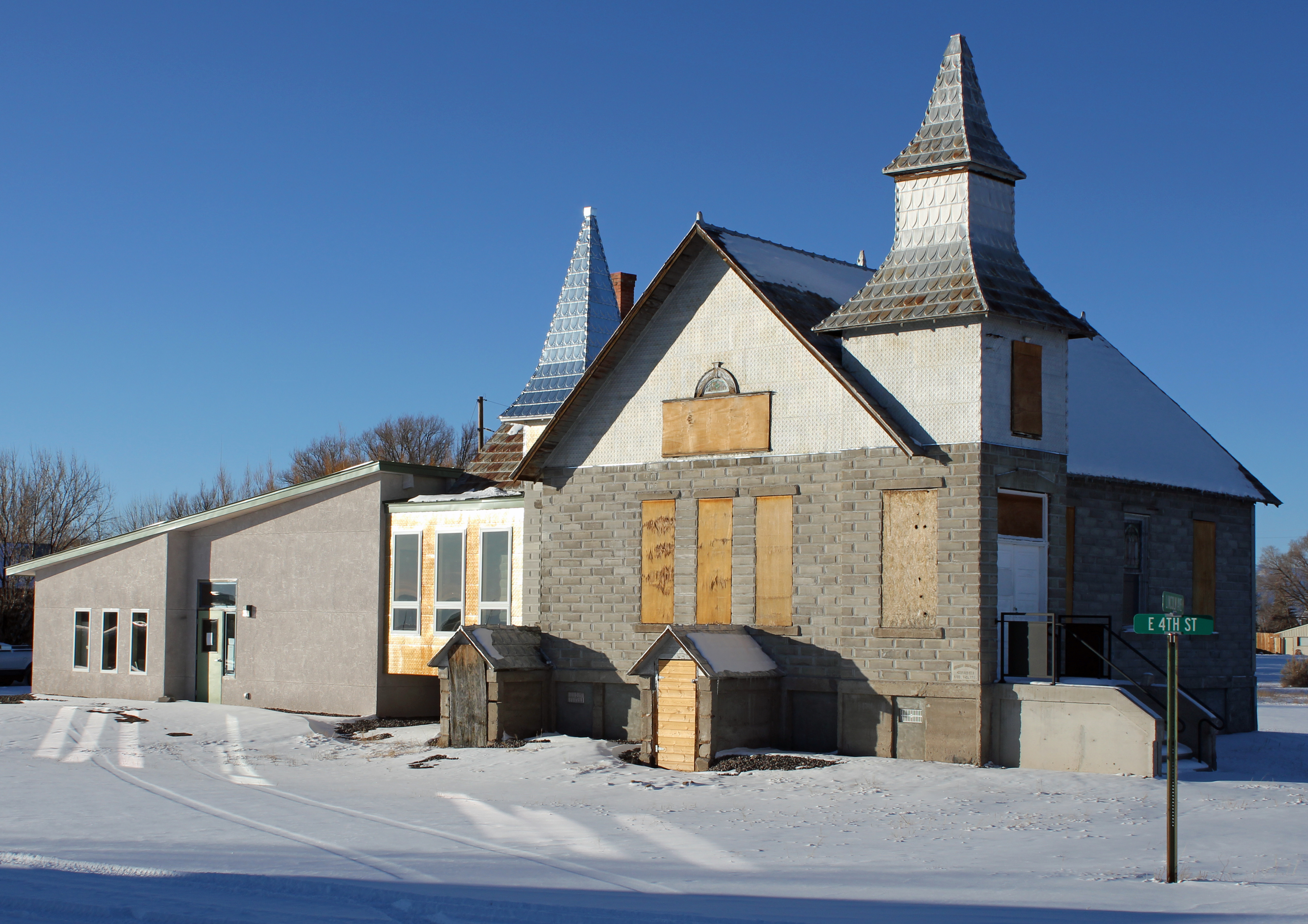

- Location within Colorado Location within the United States
- Location: 401 Lincoln Ave., Moffat, Colorado
- Coordinates: 37°59′54″N 105°54′18″W
- Area: less than one acre
- Built: 1911
- Architectural style: Late 19th and 20th Century Revivals
- MPS: Ornamental Concrete Block Buildings in Colorado MPS
- NRHP reference No.: 08000710
- Added to NRHP: July 24, 2008

First Baptist Church of Moffat (also known as Moffat Community Church) was a Baptist church in Moffat, Colorado and is a historic Place at 401 Lincoln Avenue.

It was built in 1911 and was added to the National Register in 2008.

It is a T-shaped, cross-gabled building on a concrete foundation, built with ornamental concrete block walls. It has a corner steeple and two secondary steeples. Its gables, spires, and roofs are covered with fishscale-patterned stamped metal panels.
