= Quorn Baptist Church =

Church in Leicestershire, England

Coordinates: 52°44′26.53″N 1°10′30.39″W

Quorn Baptist Church is a Baptist church in the village of Quorn, Leicestershire, England. The church is part of the Baptist Union but its congregation is made up of Christians from a variety of church backgrounds. It is a Grade II listed building.

== History ==
The original meeting house was the granite house opposite the present chapel, which was licensed for meetings in 1760. It was the home of Robert Parkinson, who played an important role in the church's founding. By 1766, preaching was being conducted regularly, the congregation had grown and, in 1770, a neat, plain meeting house was built at a cost of £270.

In 1780, a Sunday school was started by John Gamble. The same year, the church held a revival, with a hundred believers professing their faith and offering themselves for baptism. The meeting house was enlarged in 1780 at a cost of £160, but by 1790 it was again found to be too small to seat the members so the walls and roof were raised and galleries placed on three sides, all at a further cost of £200.

The three-storied middle building housing the present vestry was erected in 1818. Further alterations took place in 1846 and 1861, all to give more seating. In 1884, some old cottages were purchased, demolished and the present Sunday Schoolroom built in 1897 at a cost of £540.

== Current Church Activities ==
In 2011, the pews and organ were removed to make the church more accessible and to support its present mission. The church has a choir, a kids' club, and monthly communion. The minister is Ian Smith.
