= Needwood Baptist Church and School =

Historic church in Georgia, United States

- U.S. National Register of Historic Places
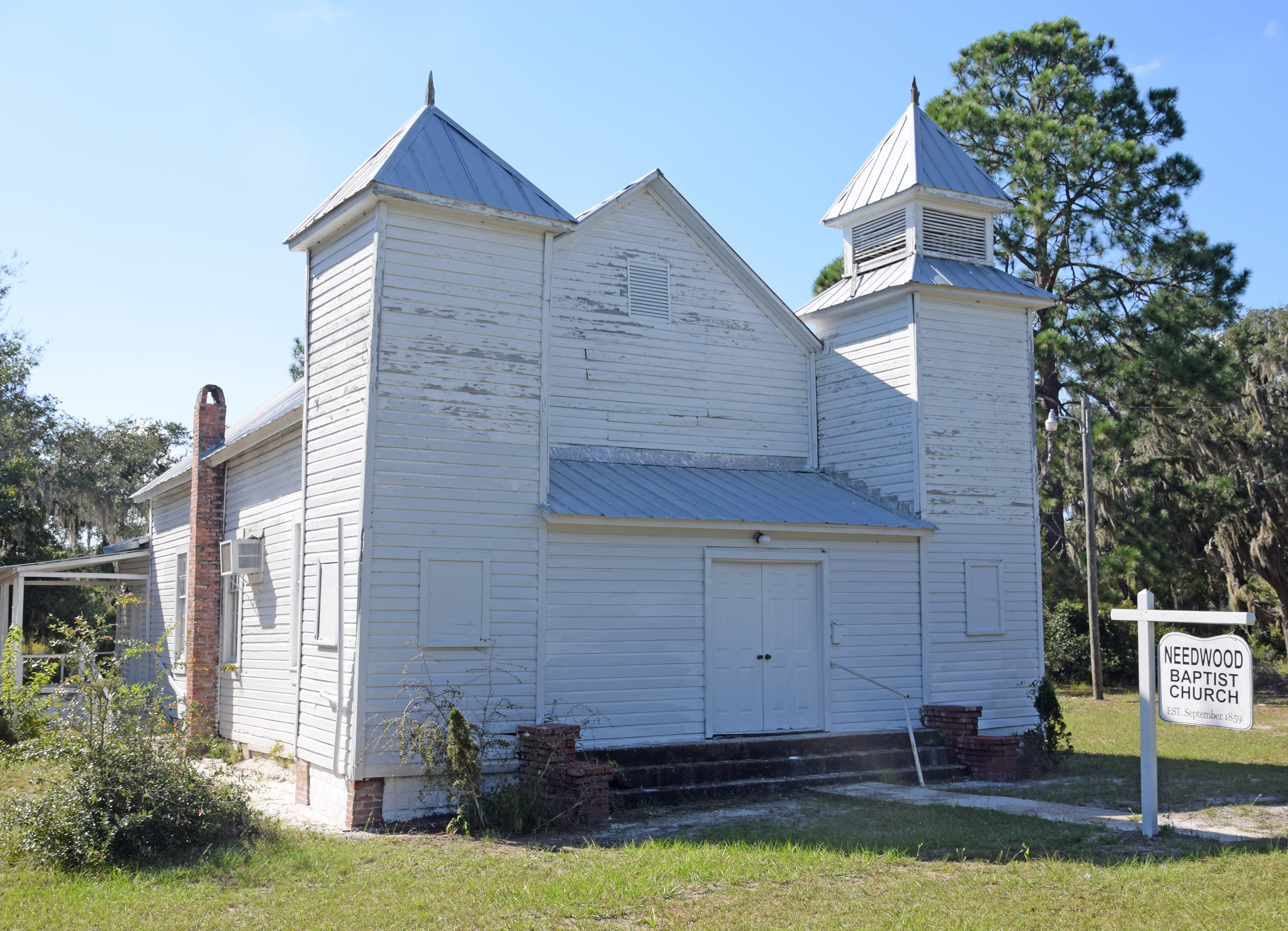

- Location within Georgia Location within the United States
- Nearest city: Brunswick, Georgia
- Coordinates: 31°16′55″N 81°26′27″W
- Area: 1 acre (0.40 ha)
- Built: 1885
- NRHP reference No.: 98001520
- Added to NRHP: December 17, 1998

Needwood Baptist Church and School are historic buildings (a church and a school) north of Brunswick, Georgia, along US 17. The oldest parts of the church date to the 1870s. The towers were added circa 1885 and contain a bell dated 1884. Thirty original pews and other original furnishings remain. The church is of no particular style, but is similar to many rural African-American churches. The school has one room and is of similar age and construction as the church. The school was used for African-American students until the 1960s. The church and school were added to the National Register of Historic Places in 1998.

== Gallery ==
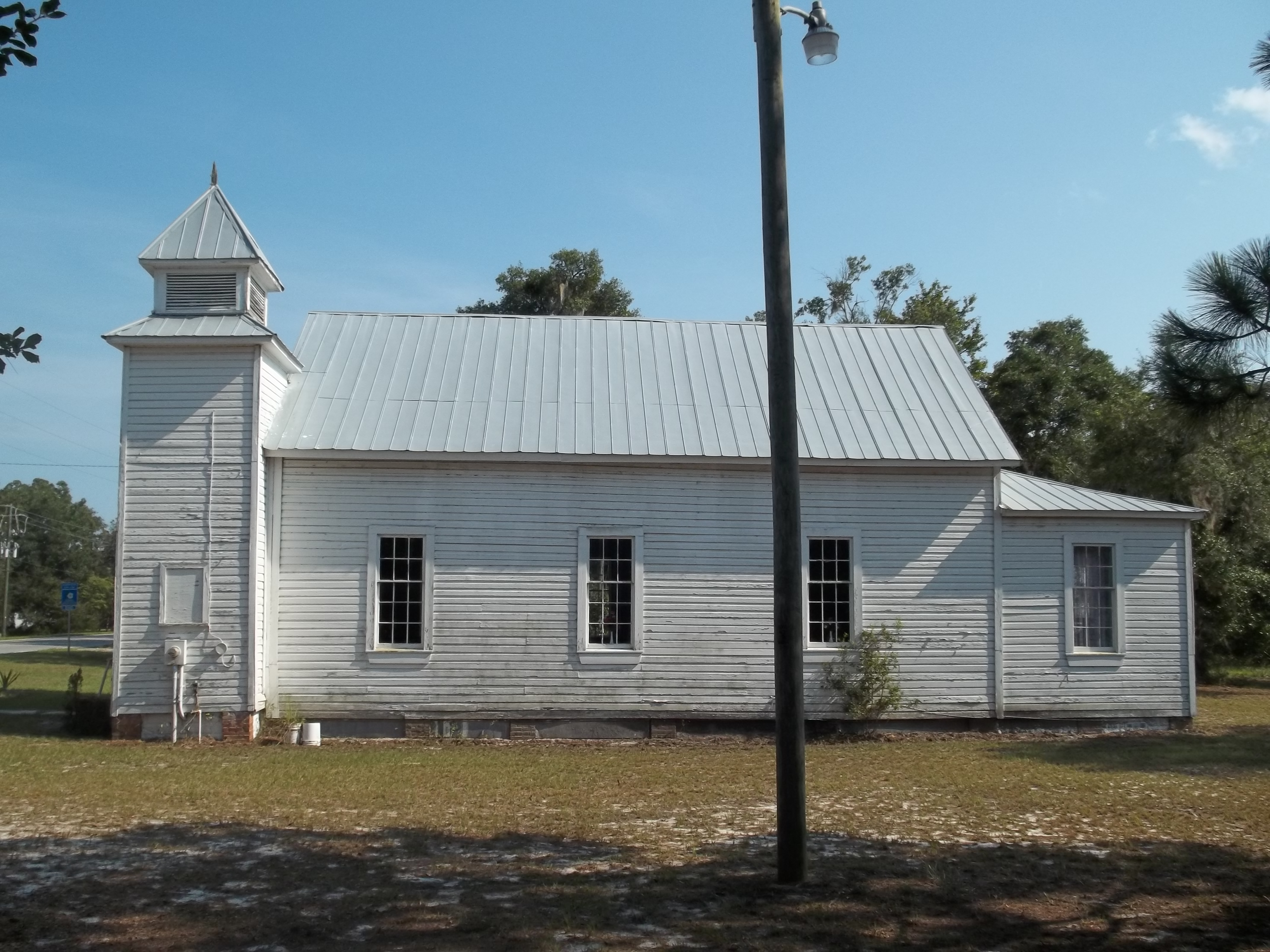
Church

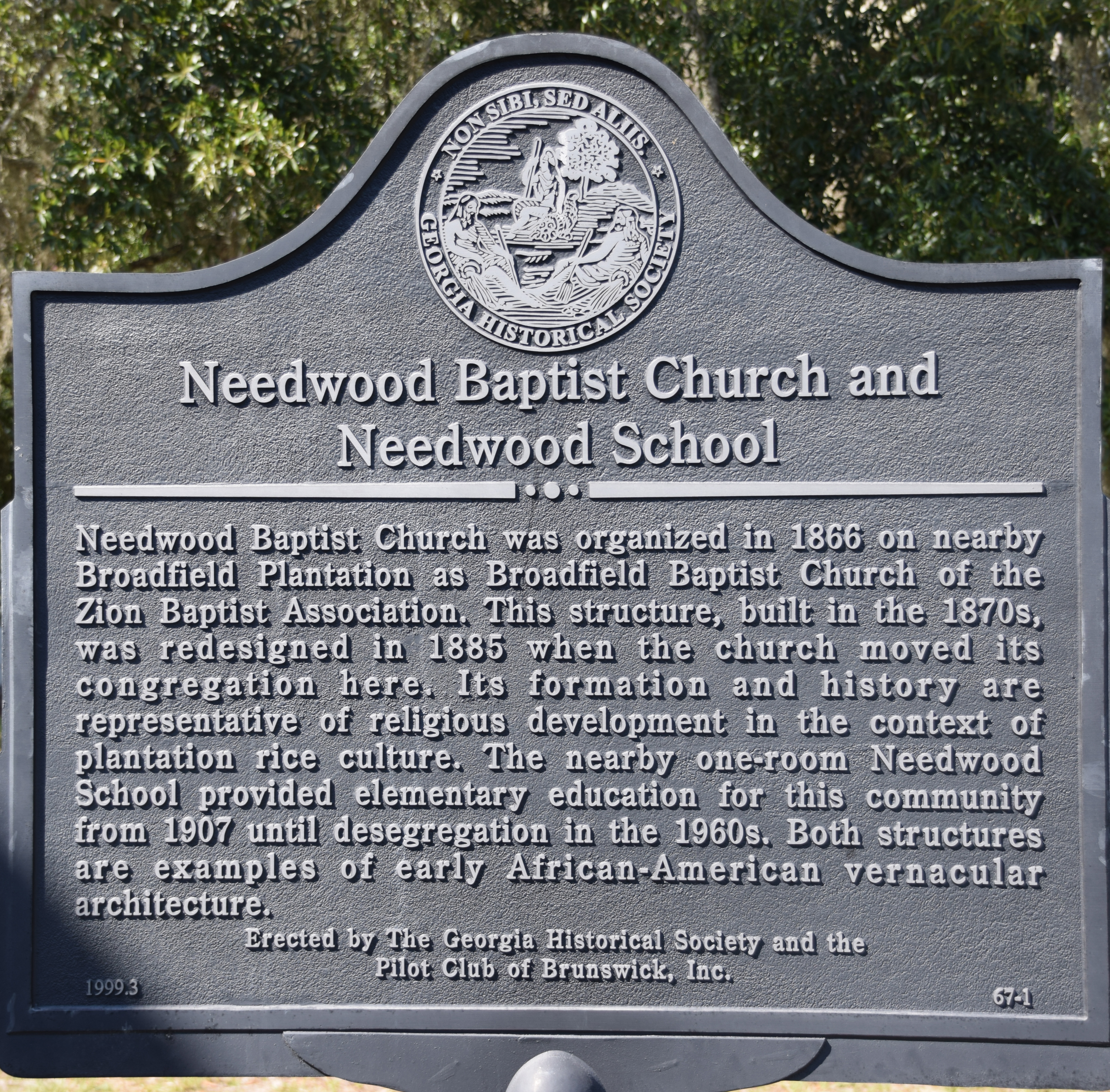
Historical marker

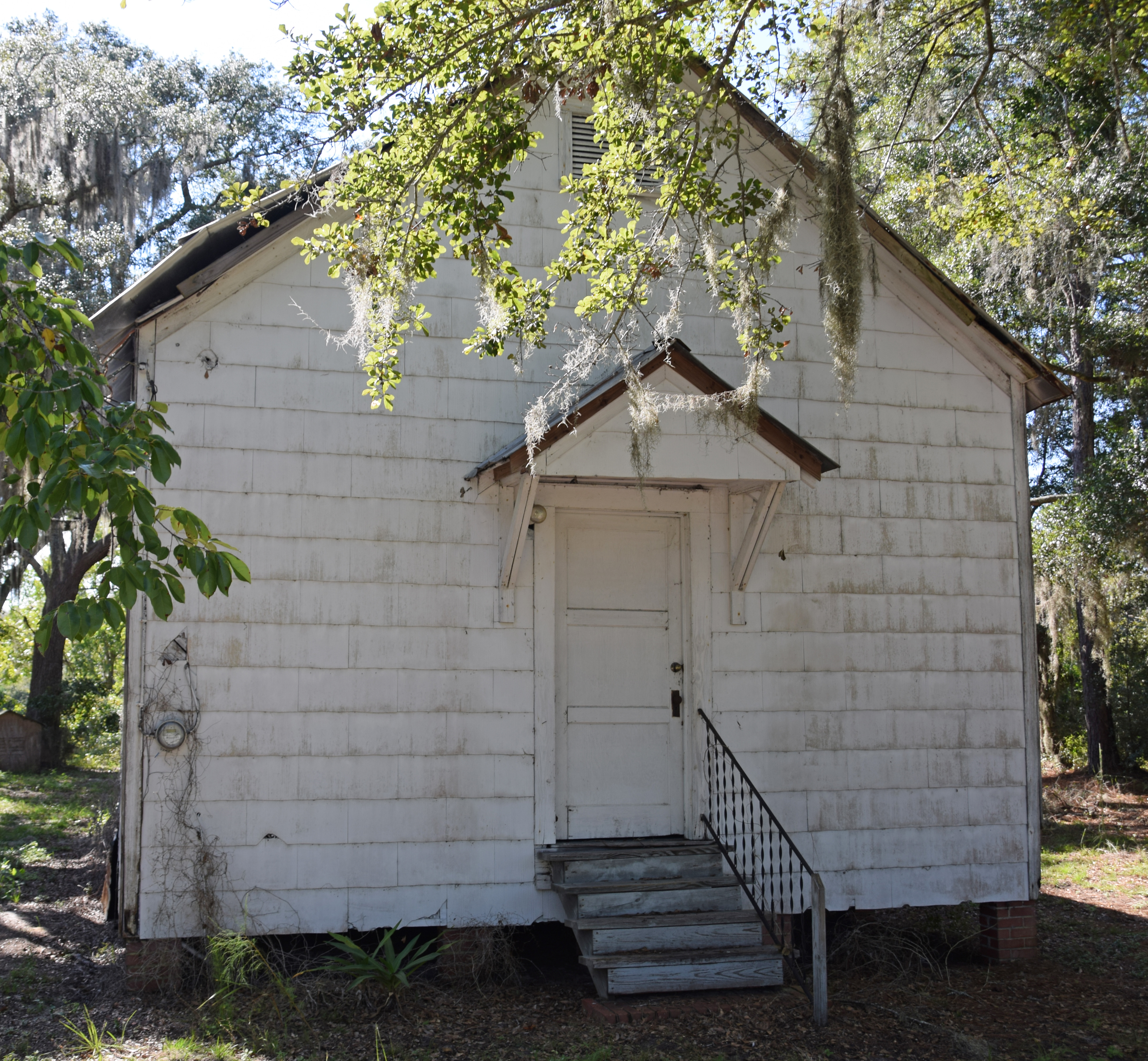
Schoolhouse
