= Mount Zion Baptist Church =

Mount Zion Baptist Church or Mt. Zion Missionary Baptist Church or variations may refer to:

== United States ==
(by state)

- Mount Zion Baptist Church (Anniston, Alabama), listed on the NRHP in Alabama
- Mt. Zion Baptist Church (Mobile, Alabama), listed on the NRHP in Alabama - Pastor Montgomery Portis Jr.
- Mount Zion Baptist Church (Brinkley, Arkansas), listed on the NRHP in Arkansas
- Mount Zion Missionary Baptist Church (Brinkley, Arkansas), listed on the NRHP in Arkansas
- Mt. Zion Missionary Baptist Church (Enola, Arkansas), listed on the NRHP in Arkansas
- Mount Zion Baptist Church (Little Rock, Arkansas), listed on the NRHP in Arkansas
- Mount Zion Baptist Church (Miami, Florida), listed on the NRHP in Florida
- Mount Zion Missionary Baptist Church (Pensacola, Florida), listed on the NRHP in Florida
- Mount Zion Baptist Church (Albany, Georgia), listed on the NRHP in Georgia
- Mt. Zion Missionary Baptist Church (Hammond, Indiana)
- Mount Zion Baptist Church (Indianapolis)
- Mt. Zion Baptist Church (Canton, Mississippi), listed on the NRHP in Mississippi
- First Mount Zion Baptist Church, Newark, New Jersey
- Mount Zion Baptist Church (Salisbury, North Carolina), listed on the NRHP in North Carolina
- Mt. Zion Baptist Church (Winston-Salem, North Carolina)
- Mount Zion Baptist Church (Athens, Ohio), listed on the NRHP in Ohio
- Mount Zion Baptist Church (Tulsa, Oklahoma)
- Mount Zion Missionary Baptist Church (Fayetteville, Tennessee), listed on the NRHP in Tennessee
- Mount Zion Baptist Church (Nashville, Tennessee), listed on the NRHP in Tennessee
- Mount Zion First Baptist Church, in San Antonio, Texas
- Mount Zion Old School Baptist Church, Aldie, Virginia, listed on the NRHP in Virginia
- Mount Zion Baptist Church (Arlington, Virginia)
- Mount Zion Baptist Church (Charlottesville, Virginia), listed on the NRHP in Virginia
- Sixth Mount Zion Baptist Church, Richmond, Virginia, listed on the NRHP in Virginia
- Mount Zion Baptist Church (Seattle, Washington), listed on the NRHP in Washington state
- Mount Zion Baptist Church (Martinsburg, West Virginia), listed on the NRHP in West Virginia
- Mount Zion Baptist Church (Wood County, West Virginia)
- Mount Zion Baptist Church, (Madison, Wisconsin)

== See also ==
- Mount Zion Church (disambiguation)
- Zion Baptist Church (disambiguation)
