= Mount Zion (disambiguation) =

Mount Zion is a hill in Jerusalem.

Mount Zion may also refer to:

== Places ==
=== Canada ===
- Mount Zion, Quinte West, Ontario

=== United States ===
- Mount Zion (Colorado), a mountain
- Mount Zion, Georgia
- Mount Zion, Illinois
- Mount Zion Township, Macon County, Illinois
- Mount Zion, Indiana
- Mount Zion, Kentucky
- Mount Zion, Missouri
- Mount Zion (New York), a mountain
- Mount Zion, Wisconsin
- Mount Zion (Washington), a mountain
- Mount Zion, West Virginia

== Buildings and institutions ==
=== Religion ===
- Mount Zion African Methodist Episcopal Church (disambiguation)
- Mount Zion Baptist Church (disambiguation)
- Mount Zion Cemetery (disambiguation)
- Mount Zion Church (disambiguation)
- Mount Zion Memorial Church, Somerset County, Maryland, U.S., a historic church
- Mount Zion Methodist Church (disambiguation)
- Mount Zion Presbyterian Church (disambiguation)
- Mount Zion United Methodist Church (disambiguation)
- Mount Zion Temple, in St Paul, Minnesota, U.S., a synagogue
- Mount Zion United Methodist Church, in Longdale, Mississippi, U.S., associated with the 1964 murders of Chaney, Goodman, and Schwerner

=== Education ===
- Mount Zion Christian Academy, Durham, North Carolina, U.S., a high school
- Mount Zion Christian Schools (Manchester, New Hampshire), U.S.
- Mount Zion College of Engineering and Technology, Pudukkottai, Tamil Nadu, India
- Mount Zion High School (disambiguation)
- Mount Zion One Room School, in Snow Hill, Maryland, U.S., a historic school
- Mt. Zion Schoolhouse, Mount Solon, Augusta County, Virginia, U.S., a historic public school building

=== Other buildings and institutions ===
- Mount Zion (Milldale, Virginia), U.S., a historic home
- Mount Zion Hospital, UCSF Medical Center, in San Francisco, California, U.S.
- Mount Zion Memorial Fund, an American non-profit corporation

== Other uses ==
- Mt. Zion (film), a 2013 New Zealand film
- Mount Zion Award, awarded by the Institute for Jewish-Christian Research at the University of Lucerne in Switzerland
- Mt. Zion (album), by American folk rock musician Josiah Queen

== See also ==
- Zion Hill (disambiguation)
- Har-Zion (disambiguation)
- Zion (disambiguation)
- Thee Silver Mt. Zion Memorial Orchestra, a Canadian band
