= Mount Zion Church =

Mount Zion Church may refer to the following churches:

== United States ==
(by state, then city/town)

- Mt. Zion Christian Church, Richmond, Kentucky
- Mount Zion Church and Cemetery (Hallsville, Missouri), listed on the National Register of Historic Places (NRHP) in Boone County
- Mount Zion Brick Church, Barada, Nebraska, listed on the NRHP in Richardson County
- Mount Zion Church (Big Sandy, Tennessee), once listed on the NRHP in Benton County
- Mount Zion Church (Decatur, Tennessee), listed on the NRHP in Meigs County
- Mt. Zion Church and Cemetery (Elkhorn, Tennessee), listed on the NRHP in Henry County

== United Kingdom ==
- West Church, Pitlochry Church of Scotland, in Perthshire, known as Mount Zion

== See also ==
- Battle of Mount Zion Church
- Mount Zion (disambiguation)
- Zion Church (disambiguation)
- Mount Zion A.M.E. Church (disambiguation)
- Mount Zion Baptist Church (disambiguation)
- Mount Zion Methodist Episcopal Church (disambiguation)
- Mount Zion Presbyterian Church (disambiguation)
- Mount Zion United Methodist Church (disambiguation)
