= Mount Zion Methodist Church =

Mount Zion Methodist Church, or variations, may refer to:

== In the United States (by state) ==
- Mt. Zion Methodist Church (Carthage, Arkansas), listed on the National Register of Historic Places (NRHP) in Arkansas
- Mount Zion Methodist Episcopal Church (Eaton, Indiana), listed on the NRHP in Indiana
- Old Zion Methodist Church (Park City, Kentucky), listed on the NRHP in Kentucky
- Mount Zion Methodist Church (Neshoba County, Mississippi), a Black church which was burned down, leading to the Mississippi Burning murders
- Mount Zion Methodist Church (Somers, New York), listed on the NRHP in New York
- Mount Zion Methodist Episcopal Church South (Fall River, Tennessee), listed on the NRHP in Tennessee
- Mt. Zion Methodist Church (Brenham, Texas), listed on the NRHP in Texas
- Zion Methodist Church (Norfolk, Virginia), listed on the NRHP in Virginia

== See also ==
- Mount Zion Church (disambiguation)
- Mount Zion Methodist Episcopal Church (disambiguation)
- Mount Zion African Methodist Episcopal Church (disambiguation)
