= Mount Zion Cemetery =

Mount Zion Cemetery may refer to:

== United States ==
- Mount Zion Cemetery (Walnut Ridge, Arkansas)
- Mount Zion Cemetery (Los Angeles, California)
- Mount Zion Church and Cemetery (Hallsville, Missouri)
- Mount Zion African Methodist Episcopal Church and Mount Zion Cemetery, New Jersey
- Mount Zion Cemetery (Kingston, New York)
- Mount Zion Cemetery (New York City), New York
- Mt. Zion Church and Cemetery (Elkhorn, Tennessee)
- Mount Zion Cemetery (Washington, D.C.)

== Other places ==
- Mount Zion Cemetery, Jerusalem

== See also ==
- Mount Zion (disambiguation)
