= UCLA Lab School =

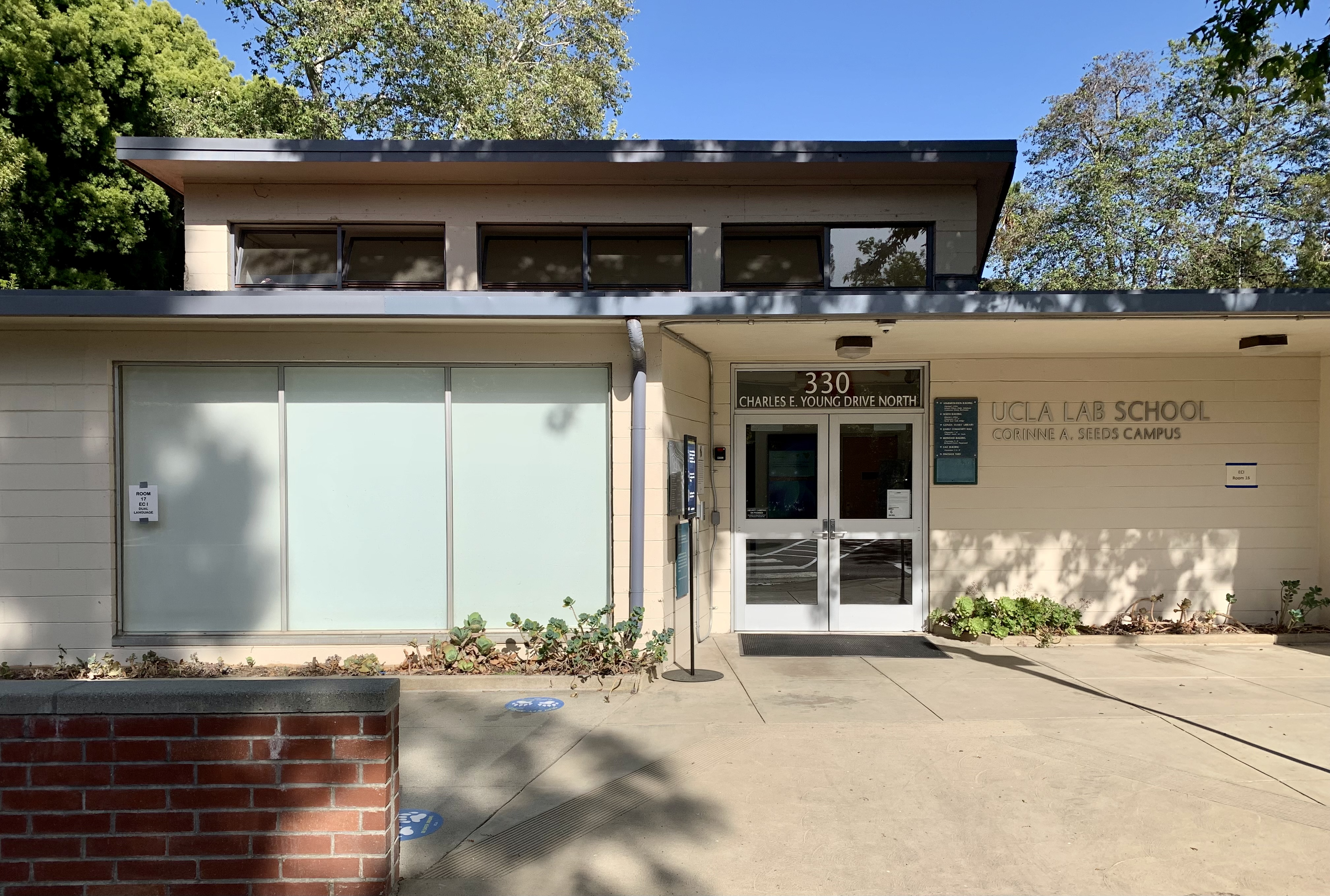

Location
- 330 Charles E. Young Drive North; Los Angeles, California 90095; United States; 34.0754°N 118.4441°W

Information
- Type: Laboratory school
- Established: 1882
- Oversight: University of California, Los Angeles
- Principal: Renata Christina Gusmao-Garcia Williams
- Grades: Pre-K–6
- Gender: Coeducational
- Website: labschool.ucla.edu

UCLA Lab School is the laboratory school of the UCLA School of Education and Information Studies. Located on UCLA's main Westwood campus since the 1950s, it currently serves 450 students ranging in ages from 4 to 12.

Founded as a demonstration school for the Los Angeles branch of the California State Normal School in 1882, the school was previously known as University Elementary School (1929-1982) and Corinne A. Seeds University Elementary School (1982-2009). The name was changed in 2009 to better convey the school's purpose as a laboratory for research and innovation in education. CONNECT, an onsite research center, allows educators and researchers to explore ideas about teaching, learning and child development.

== History ==
UCLA Lab School was founded in 1882 as the demonstration school of the California State Normal School at Los Angeles. Located on the site of today’s Central Library in downtown Los Angeles, the Normal School prepared teachers for educating the growing city. By 1914, enrollment had far exceeded capacity, so the Normal School and the children's school moved to a Hollywood campus off a dirt road that later became Vermont Avenue. In 1919, the regents approved the establishment of the “Southern Branch of the University of California,” which expanded and became the University of California at Los Angeles in 1927. With the university's move to Westwood in 1929, the children's school began leasing property owned by Los Angeles City Schools east of the main UCLA campus on Warner Avenue.

The children’s school was called University Elementary School (UES) and was led by principal Corinne A. Seeds. An educator heavily influenced by the teachings of John Dewey, Seeds became a key figure in developing and promoting progressive education during the 1930s, '40s and '50s. She believed that "to keep education dynamic, children must have experiences that they care about."

In 1945, the university lost its lease on the Warner Avenue location and left the site the following year. From September 1946 to June 1947, UES was without a schoolhouse, but some classes continued in private homes. Supporters of Seeds and progressive education successfully lobbied the state legislature to fund a relocation onto the UCLA campus. While World War II restrictions prevented building efforts, supporters found unused army barracks and transferred them to the Westwood campus to be used as a temporary school facility.

The first permanent school buildings for the elementary school were completed in 1950 and designed by architects Robert Alexander and Richard Neutra. The architects worked closely with Seeds and other members of the school community to promote children’s movement and exploration through the integration of indoor and outdoor space and flexible configurations of the learning environment.

Over the decades, UES has been led by directors and principals that include John Goodlad, Madeline Hunter and Deborah Stipek. In 1982, the school was renamed the Corinne A. Seeds University Elementary School. In 2009, the UCLA Lab School name took hold on the Corinne A. Seeds Campus.

== Notable alumni ==
- Derek Bok – lawyer, educator, and former president of Harvard University
- Leonardo DiCaprio – actor
- Andrea Fay Friedman – Actress
- Eric Garcetti – politician, Mayor of Los Angeles
- Kim Gordon – musician, Sonic Youth
- Alex Greenwald – lead singer of Phantom Planet
- Emma Walton Hamilton – actress and author of children's books
- Wendy Kellogg - social scientist, former manager of Social Computing at Thomas J. Watson Research Center
- Henry McHenry – biological anthropologist
- Jason Schwartzman – actor and musician
- Earl Sweatshirt – rapper, record producer, skateboarder, musician, and former member of Los Angeles–based hip hop collective Odd Future

== Bibliography ==
- Weiler, Kathleen (1998). Country Schoolwomen: Teaching in Rural California,1850-1950. Stanford: Stanford University Press. ISBN 978-0804730044.
- Weiler, Kathleen (2011). Democracy and Schooling in California: The Legacy of Helen Heffernan and Corrine Seeds. New York: Palgrave Macmillan. ISBN 978-0-230-33824-1.
