= Zion Hill =

Zion Hill may refer to:

- Mount Zion, a hill in Jerusalem, Israel
- Thompson, Texas, also known as Zion Hill
- Zion Hill Mission, in Queensland, Australia

== See also ==
- Zion's Hill or Hell's Gate, on the Dutch Caribbean island of Saba
- Zionhill, Pennsylvania, United States
- Zions Hill, an historic house in Dexter, Maine, United States
- Mount Zion (disambiguation)
