= Zion Baptist Church =

Zion Baptist Church may refer to:

in the United States

(by state)

- Zion Baptist Church (Marietta, Georgia), listed on the National Register of Historic Places (NRHP)
- Zion Baptist Church (Collinsville, Mississippi), NRHP-listed
- Zion Baptist Church (Omaha, Nebraska)

== See also ==
- Mount Zion Baptist Church (disambiguation)
