= Sandy Springs, South Carolina =

Sandy Springs
- CDP
- Location within the state of South Carolina
- Coordinates: 34°35′50″N 82°45′23″W
- Country: United States
- State: South Carolina
- County: Anderson

Area
  - Total: 2.90 sq mi (7.50 km^{2})
  - Land: 2.87 sq mi (7.44 km^{2})
  - Water: 0.023 sq mi (0.06 km^{2})
- Elevation: 810 ft (250 m)

Population (2020)
  - Total: 1,002
  - Density: 348.8/sq mi (134.69/km^{2})
- Time zone: UTC-5 (Eastern (EST))
  - Summer (DST): UTC-4 (EDT)
- FIPS code: 45-63655
- GNIS feature ID: 2812930

Sandy Springs is an unincorporated community and census-designated place (CDP) in Anderson County, South Carolina. It was first listed as a CDP in the 2020 census with a population of 1,002.

It is located on U.S. Route 76 between Anderson and Clemson. The name comes from a literal spring in the sands.

It is the birthplace of Freddie Stowers, the only African-American to be awarded the Medal of Honor for his service in World War I.

== Demographics ==
Historical population
Census	Pop.	Note	%±
2020	1,002		—
U.S. Decennial Census; 2020

Sandy Springs first appeared as a census designated place in the 2020 U.S. census.

=== 2020 census ===
Sandy Springs CDP, South Carolina – Demographic Profile (NH = Non-Hispanic)
Race / Ethnicity	Pop 2020	% 2020
White alone (NH)	785	78.34%
Black or African American alone (NH)	79	7.88%
Native American or Alaska Native alone (NH)	0	0.00%
Asian alone (NH)	25	2.50%
Pacific Islander alone (NH)	1	0.10%
Some Other Race alone (NH)	0	0.00%
Mixed Race/Multi-Racial (NH)	59	5.89%
Hispanic or Latino (any race)	53	5.29%
Total	1,002	100.00%

Note: the US Census treats Hispanic/Latino as an ethnic category. This table excludes Latinos from the racial categories and assigns them to a separate category. Hispanics/Latinos can be of any race.

== See also ==
- Mount Zion Presbyterian Church
