= Har-Zion =

Har-Zion or Har Zion (Hebrew: הר ציון, "Mount Zion") may refer to:

- Meir Har-Zion (1934-2014), Israeli commando
- Temple Har Zion, Thornhill, Ontario, Canada, see List of synagogues in the Greater Toronto Area
- Har Zion Cemetery near the community of Collingdale, Pennsylvania, United States, where the Hermesprota Creek begins
- Har Zion Temple, Penn Valley, Pennsylvania, United States

== See also ==
- Mount Zion (disambiguation)
