= Mount Zion High School =

Mount Zion High School may refer to:

- Mount Zion High School (Carrollton, Georgia)
- Mount Zion High School (Jonesboro, Georgia)
- Mount Zion High School (Illinois), Mount Zion, Illinois

== See also ==
- Mount Zion (disambiguation)#Education
- Mount Zion Christian Academy
