= Otego (town), New York =

Otego, New York
- Town
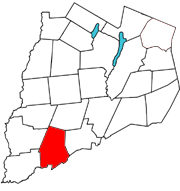
- Otsego County map with the Town of Otego in red
- Coordinates: 42.3973°N 75.1735°W
- Country: United States
- State: New York
- County: Otsego

Area
  - Total: 45.71 sq mi (118.38 km^{2})
  - Land: 45.63 sq mi (118.19 km^{2})
  - Water: 0.077 sq mi (0.20 km^{2})
- Elevation: 1,070 ft (330 m)

Population (2010)
  - Total: 3,115
  - Estimate (2016): 2,941
  - Density: 64.4/sq mi (24.88/km^{2})
- Time zone: UTC-5 (Eastern (EST))
  - Summer (DST): UTC-4 (EDT)
- ZIP code: 13825
- Area code: 607
- FIPS code: 36-077-55629
- Website: Town website

Otego is a town located in the southwest portion of Otsego County, New York, United States. The population was 3,115 at the 2010 census.

The Town of Otego is on the southern border of the county and contains a village with the same name, Otego. The town and the village are southwest of Oneonta.

== History ==
The town was first settled circa 1775, but few more arrived until after the American Revolution. Tension between ethnic Germans and New Englanders slowed early development.

The Town of Otego was formed in 1822 from the towns of Unadilla and Franklin (in Delaware County) as the "Town of Huntsville." In 1830, the name was changed to Otego, when part of the Town of Milford was added.

The Otsdawa Creek Site was listed on the National Register of Historic Places in 1980.

== Geography ==
According to the United States Census Bureau, the town has a total area of 44.9 square miles (116.2 km^{2}), all land.

The Susquehanna River flows through the southern part of the town. Otego Creek enters the Susquehanna River east of the eastern town line. Otsdawa Creek flows down the eastern side of Otego.

Interstate 88 and New York State Route 7 follow the course of the Susquehanna River.

The southern town line is the border of Delaware County.

== Demographics ==
Historical population
Census	Pop.	Note	%±
1820	1,414		—
1830	2,136		51.1%
1840	1,919		−10.2%
1850	1,792		−6.6%
1860	1,957		9.2%
1870	2,052		4.9%
1880	1,918		−6.5%
1890	1,840		−4.1%
1900	1,817		−1.2%
1910	1,699		−6.5%
1920	1,366		−19.6%
1930	1,373		0.5%
1940	1,508		9.8%
1950	1,769		17.3%
1960	2,008		13.5%
1970	2,249		12.0%
1980	2,801		24.5%
1990	3,128		11.7%
2000	3,183		1.8%
2010	3,115		−2.1%
2016 (est.)	2,941	▼	−5.6%
U.S. Decennial Census

As of the census of 2000, there were 3,183 people, 1,234 households, and 874 families residing in the town. The population density was 70.9 inhabitants per square mile (27.4/km^{2}). There were 1,383 housing units at an average density of 30.8 per square mile (11.9/km^{2}). The racial makeup of the town was 97.55% White, 1.01% Black or African American, 0.22% Native American, 0.44% Asian, 0.16% from other races, and 0.63% from two or more races. Hispanic or Latino people of any race were 1.19% of the population.

There were 1,234 households, out of which 33.8% had children under the age of 18 living with them, 56.2% were married couples living together, 9.6% had a female householder with no husband present, and 29.1% were non-families. 22.0% of all households were made up of individuals, and 10.3% had someone living alone who was 65 years of age or older. The average household size was 2.54 and the average family size was 2.93.

In the town, the population was spread out, with 27.0% under the age of 18, 5.9% from 18 to 24, 27.0% from 25 to 44, 25.8% from 45 to 64, and 14.2% who were 65 years of age or older. The median age was 39 years. For every 100 females, there were 93.0 males. For every 100 females age 18 and over, there were 89.5 males.

The median income for a household in the town was $31,563, and the median income for a family was $36,543. Males had a median income of $27,986 versus $25,868 for females. The per capita income for the town was $15,479. About 8.7% of families and 11.4% of the population were below the poverty line, including 13.8% of those under age 18 and 6.6% of those age 65 or over.

== Communities and locations in the Town of Otego ==
- Calder Hill – A small mountain chain located north of Otego. It consists of two main peaks, with the higher being 1841 feet. It was named after Godfrey Calder.
- Center Brook – A former location in the town
- Cooks Corners – A hamlet in the northwestern part of the town, located on County Highway 6
- Hell Hollow – Also known as "The Perry District", named by a former schoolteacher in response to the antics of his students
- Lake Misery – Small lake in the northwestern part of town
- Mill Creek – Small community west of Hell Hollow and north of the Village of Otego, on the creek of same name that once powered many small mills
- Mount Zion – An elevation southwest of Otego, partly in Delaware County
- Otego – The Village of Otego on NY-7
- Otsdawa – A hamlet in the northeastern part of the town, located on County Highway 8 and the West Branch Otsdawa Creek. The Otsdawa Baptist Church was listed on the National Register of Historic Places in 2002.

== Notable people ==
- Helen Burbank, secretary of state of Vermont
