= Davis Family House =

Historic house in North Carolina, United States

- U.S. National Register of Historic Places
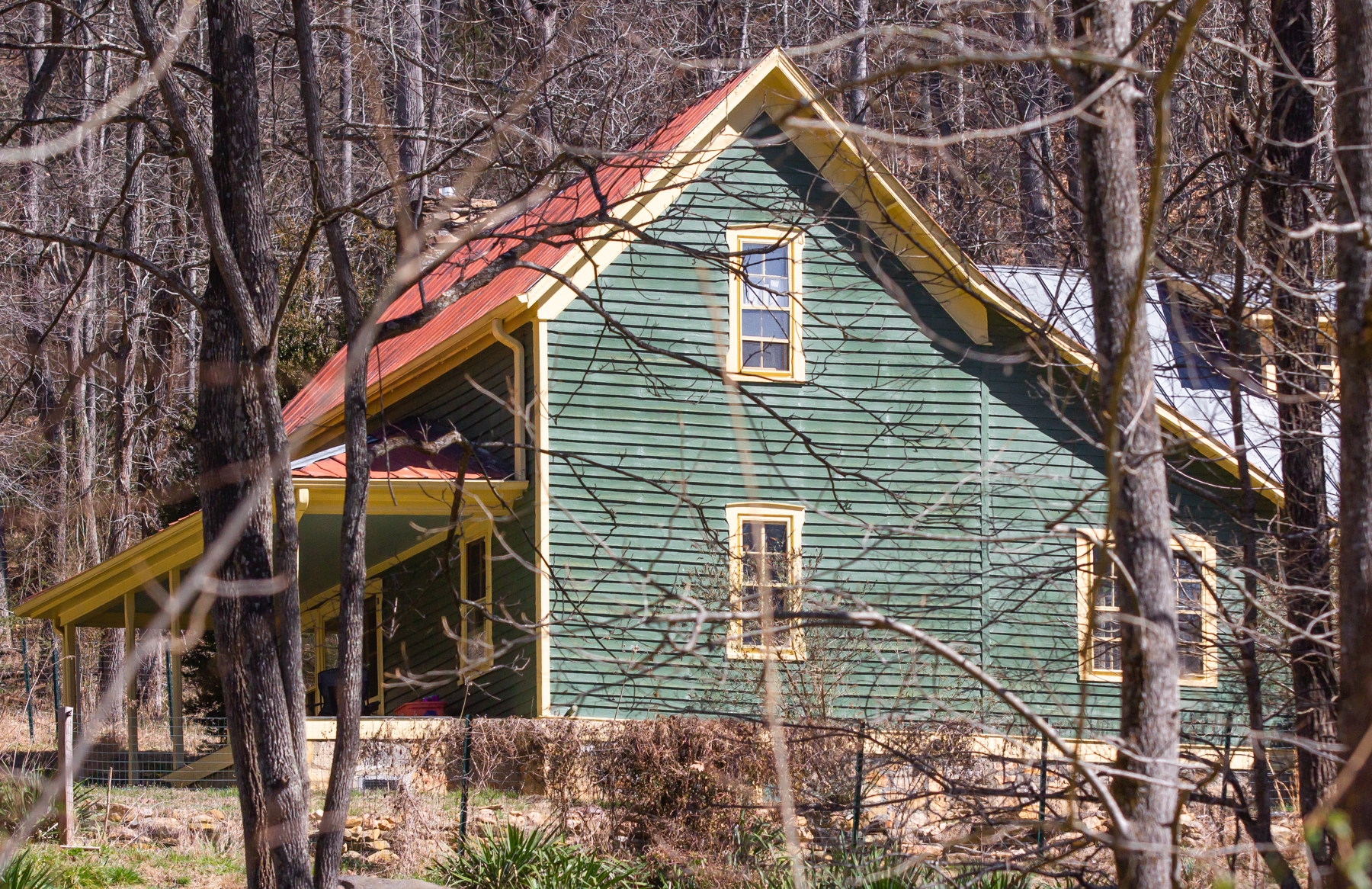

- Location within North Carolina Location within the United States
- Location: N side of NC 1355, .8 miles NW of Ferguson Br. over the Pigeon River, near Crabtree, North Carolina
- Coordinates: 35°37′21″N 82°58′26″W
- Area: 8 acres (3.2 ha)
- Built: c. 1880
- Built by: Arrington, R.F.; Rathbone, D.R.
- Architectural style: two room plan
- NRHP reference No.: 96001527
- Added to NRHP: December 27, 1996

Davis Family House, also known as the Davis-Forbes House, is a historic home located near Crabtree, Haywood County, North Carolina. It was built about 1880, and is a 1 1/2-story, two-room plan frame dwelling sheathed in weatherboard. It was expanded by a shed-room addition in 1925–1926. The front facade features a one-story hip-roof porch.

It was listed on the National Register of Historic Places in 1996.
