= Mount Zion Christian Schools (Manchester, New Hampshire) =

Coordinates: 42°57′39″N 71°27′32″W

- Manchester, NH; USA

Information
- Type: Private Christian
- Motto: Equipping Students for God's Purpose
- Religious affiliation: Non-denominational Christian
- Established: 2004
- Headmaster: Andrea Hamlin, M.Ed.
- Faculty: 20 per year on average
- Enrollment: 145 per year on average
- Average class size: 10 students
- Student to teacher ratio: often less than 10:1
- Campus: Urban
- Colors: Blue & Gold
- Athletics: 3 interscholastic (soccer, basketball, track)
- Mascot: Lion
- Website: www.mountzionnh.org

Mount Zion Christian Schools is a private, coeducational Christian school located at 132 Titus Avenue in Manchester, New Hampshire, United States. The school offers traditional Christian education for grades pre-K-12.

== History ==
The school was formed in 2004. Its elementary school was formerly known as Faith Christian Academy and Community Christian School. The high school took over teaching the students of the then-closing Concord Christian High School, with some of that school's faculty.

The school opened on the campus of Faith Christian Church in Bedford, New Hampshire. The campus has since moved to a facility of its own on Titus Avenue, in Manchester.

== Affiliations ==
Mount Zion Christian Schools is affiliated with the Intentional Schools. The school is accredited by the New England Association of Schools and Colleges. The school is also a member of the Granite State Christian Schools Association.

== Student body ==
Mount Zion Christian Schools is a coeducational institution. The student body consists roughly of half boys and half girls. The school has a multi-denominational tradition where parents or students are asked to sign a Christian statement of faith before admission is granted.

The school keeps low student-to-teacher ratios with most classes averaging 10 students.

Over the years, the school has hosted several international students as it is recognized as a SEVIS international-student visa-granting school.

The school has "rolling open admissions", admitting new students throughout the school year.

== Academics ==
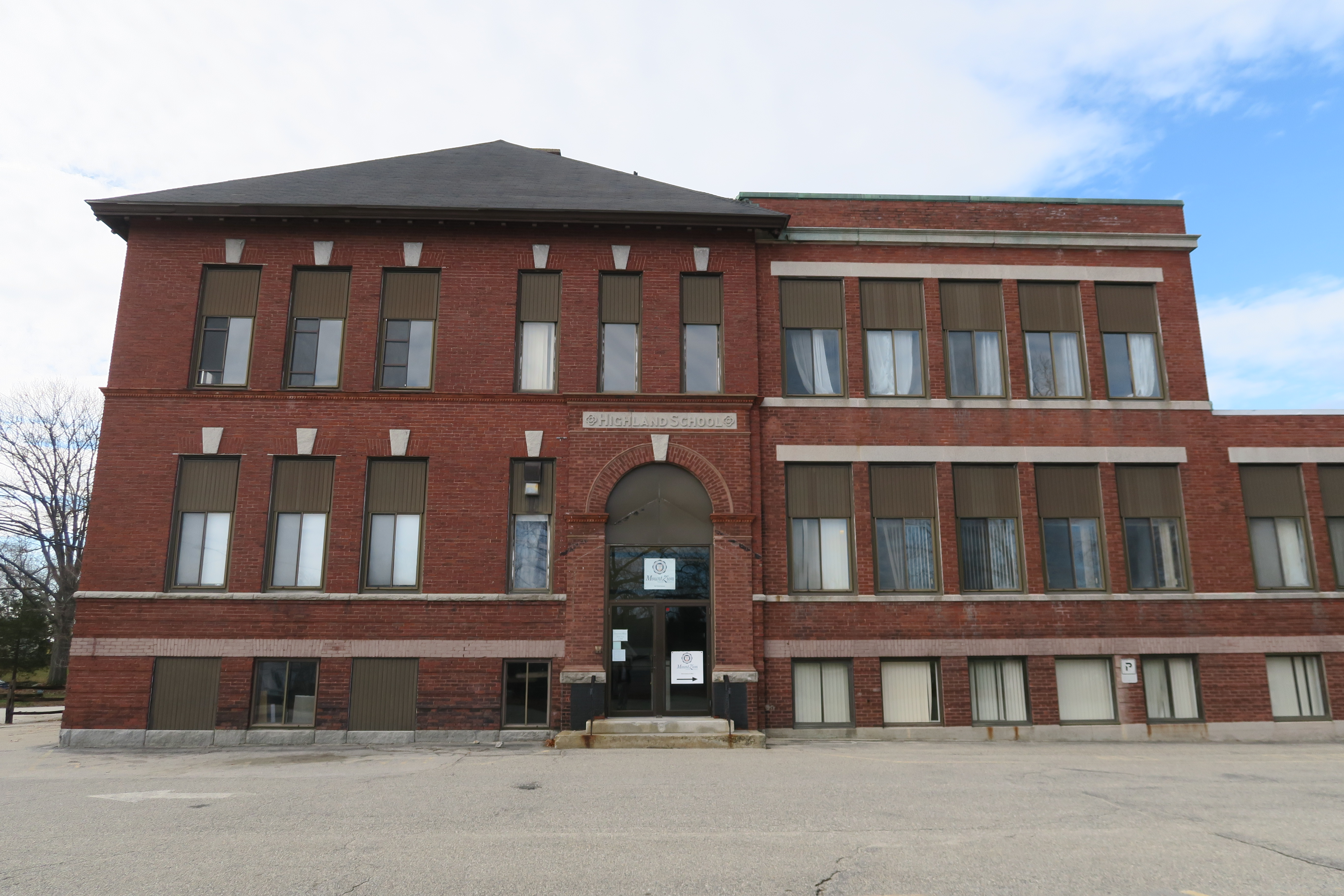

Mount Zion Christian Schools conduct most of their classes using direct teaching and Madeline Cheek Hunter's method.

Core subjects are taught using differentiated instruction where classes are taught at three different levels. Students with emerging skills operate in an inclusive classroom at "level 1" while more apt students exercise their skills at "level 2". Gifted and experienced students are assigned "level 3" tasks and assessments.

While all subjects are taught from a Biblical viewpoint, curricula includes Christian and secular resources. The Singapore Math program has been the signature math program for grades K to 6 since 2008. In Language Arts, "Six Traits of Writing" has been taught from grades K to 12, since 2010. The schools were early adopters of the Common Core State Standards Initiatie, meeting or exceeding its guidelines since before 2011.

The school has used the NWEA MAP standardized testing system since 2011. So far it has tested its student body on a seasonal basis. Reported gains in student scores have far exceeded nationwide norms. The school also has an Advanced Placement Calculus AB and Statistics program for qualifying high school students. Students in grades 10 and 11 participate in PSAT/NMSQT writing events in the fall of each academic year.

== Extra-curricular ==
Mount Zion Christian Schools offers a variety of extra-curricular programs.

Since 2012, the school offers Spanish as a World Language to its student body from grades 1 to High School "Spanish IV" levels.

The Performance Arts Department has instructors in music, dance, and drama.

== Athletics ==
Physical education classes are taken once to three times weekly by students grades preschool to 8.

In the high school, rather than having physical education classes, Mount Zion Christian Schools requires all its students to play sports. These sports include soccer and basketball.

== Traditions ==
Mount Zion Christian Schools are home to many traditions. The end of each quarter is celebrated in school-wide festivities.

The first quarter is celebrated with a Fall Festival where students participate in Harvest games such as making apple cider, bob-the-apple, climb the hay bale, etc. The second quarter closes with all-afternoon Christmas celebrations for each grade. The third quarter concludes with the popular Winter Festival where grades K to 12 are put into multi-age teams to compete in sleigh ride races, snowman making contest, get-the-headmaster snowball throwing contest, etc. The more recent end of the fourth quarter tradition has been a prayer walk where multi-age teams pilgrim around various points of interest around the school while keeping prayer intentions.

Chapel tradition for the last week of each quarter is a school favorite. Students gather for a school-wide "chapel buddies" chapel where older students are paired with younger students for a special worship service.

Over the years, the name "Chapel Buddies," was cycled out, becoming "Pride Buddies" before ultimately landing on "Lions and Cubs." Though the name has been changed, the fundamental idea is still the same.

At the beginning of each month, the school holds a "free community lunch" where students eat with their teachers, gathered around a large table for a family-style meal. Food and drinks are provided by the school for this occasion.

A Christmas recital is held yearly and features musical performances by the elementary and middle schools. The evening concert has been held at Manchester Christian Church since 2011.

Traditionally the student-elected high school student government has held a yearly Harvest party in the fall and a semi-formal Valentine's Day Banquet in the winter.

The schools put an Arts Festival together each spring to celebrate visual arts, graphic and computer-aided design. Drama and musical performances are sometimes showcased.
