= Otsdawa Baptist Church =

Historic church in New York, United States

- U.S. National Register of Historic Places
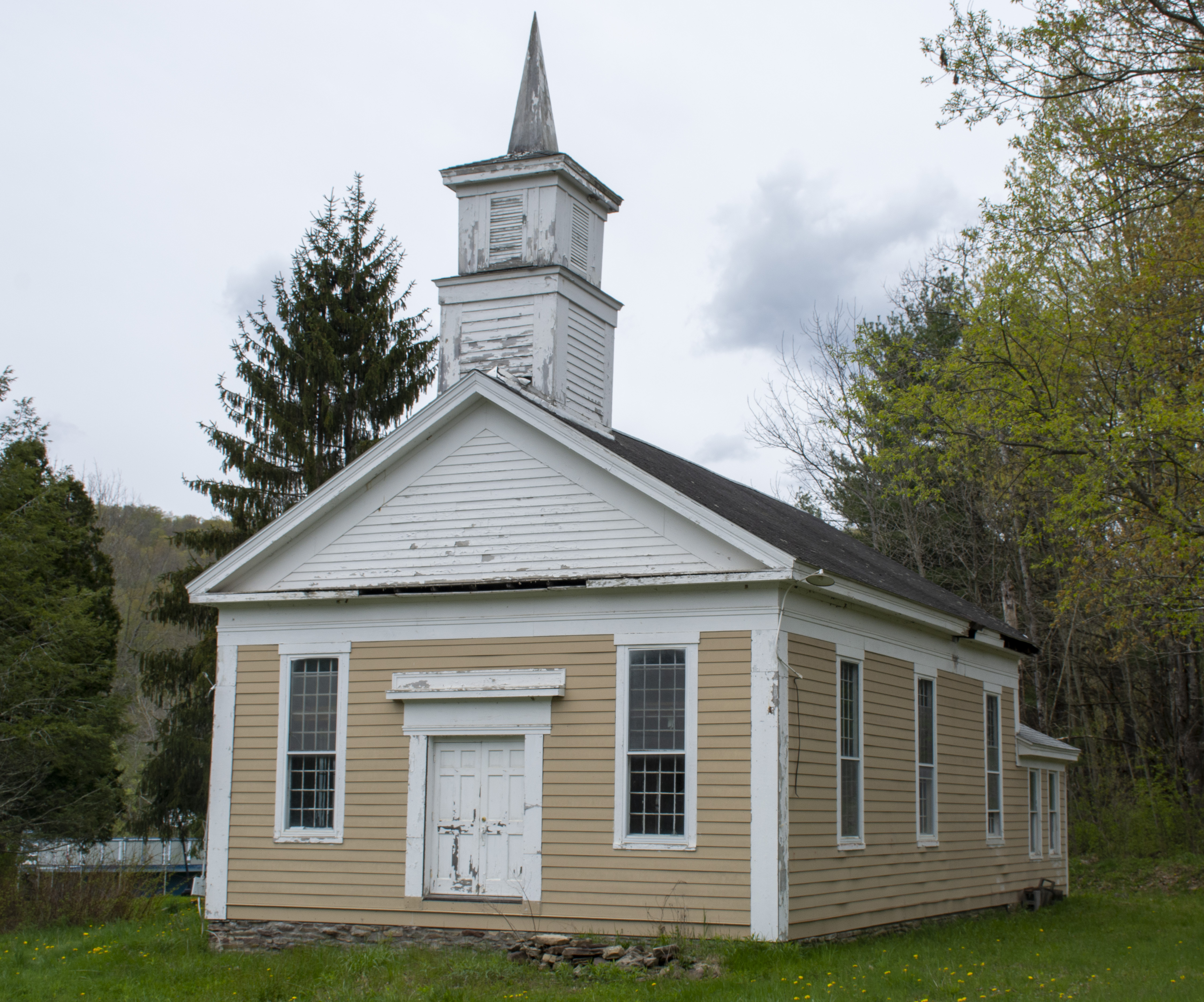

- Location within New York Location within the United States
- Location: Cty Rd. 8 Otsdawa, New York
- Coordinates: 42°29′11″N 75°10′25″W
- Area: less than one acre
- Built: 1840
- Architectural style: Greek Revival
- NRHP reference No.: 02000143
- Added to NRHP: March 6, 2002

Otsdawa Baptist Church is a historic Free Will Baptist church on City Road 8 in Otsdawa, Otsego County, New York. It was built in 1840 and is a one-story rectangular building, three bays wide and three bays deep. The building is of wood-frame construction with clapboard siding. It sits on a stone foundation with a gable roof in the Greek Revival style. The roof is surmounted by a two-stage tower with a small spire.

It was listed on the National Register of Historic Places in 2002.
