= Crabtree, North Carolina =

Unincorporated community in North Carolina, US

Coordinates: 35°36′06″N 82°56′28″W

Crabtree is an unincorporated community in Haywood County, North Carolina, United States. It is located north of Lake Junaluska along the Pigeon River.

The Davis Family House and Mount Zion United Methodist Church are listed on the National Register of Historic Places.

== History ==
Prior to European colonization, the area that is now Crabtree was inhabited by the Cherokee people and other Indigenous peoples for thousands of years. The Cherokee in Western North Carolina are known as the Eastern Band of Cherokee Indians, a federally recognized tribe.
