= Mount Zion Presbyterian Church =

Mount Zion Presbyterian Church, Mt. Zion Presbyterian Church, or Zion Presbyterian Church may refer to:

- Mount Zion Presbyterian Church (Chandlersville, Ohio)
- Mount Zion Presbyterian Church (Sandy Springs, South Carolina)
- Mt. Zion Presbyterian Church (Bishopville, South Carolina)
- Mt. Zion Presbyterian Church (Relfs Bluff, Arkansas)
- Zion Presbyterian Church (Clarkson, Nebraska)
- Zion Presbyterian Church (Columbia, Tennessee)
