= Mt. Zion Baptist Church (Canton, Mississippi) =

Historic church in Mississippi, United States

- U.S. National Register of Historic Places
- Location within Mississippi Location within the United States
- Location: 514 West North St., Canton, Mississippi
- Coordinates: 32°36′54″N 90°2′29″W
- Area: less than one acre
- Built: 1929
- Architect: Raymond H. Spencer
- Architectural style: Classical Revival
- NRHP reference No.: 00000333
- Added to NRHP: April 6, 2000

Mt. Zion Baptist Church is a historic church at 514 West North Street in Canton, Mississippi.

The Classical Revival building was constructed in 1929 and was added to the National Register of Historic Places in 2000.
