= Mount Zion (New York) =

Small mountain chain in New York State

- Location within New York Location within the United States

Highest point
- Elevation: 1,988 feet (606 m)
- Coordinates: 42°21′27″N 75°11′33″W

Geography
- Location: Otego, New York, U.S.
- Topo map: USGS Franklin

Mount Zion is a small mountain chain in the Central New York region of New York. It is located southwest of Otego, New York. It is made of two main peaks. One is in Otsego County and the other, being the tallest at 1988 feet, in Delaware County.
