= Mount Zion United Methodist Church (Crabtree, North Carolina) =

Historic church in North Carolina, United States

- U.S. National Register of Historic Places
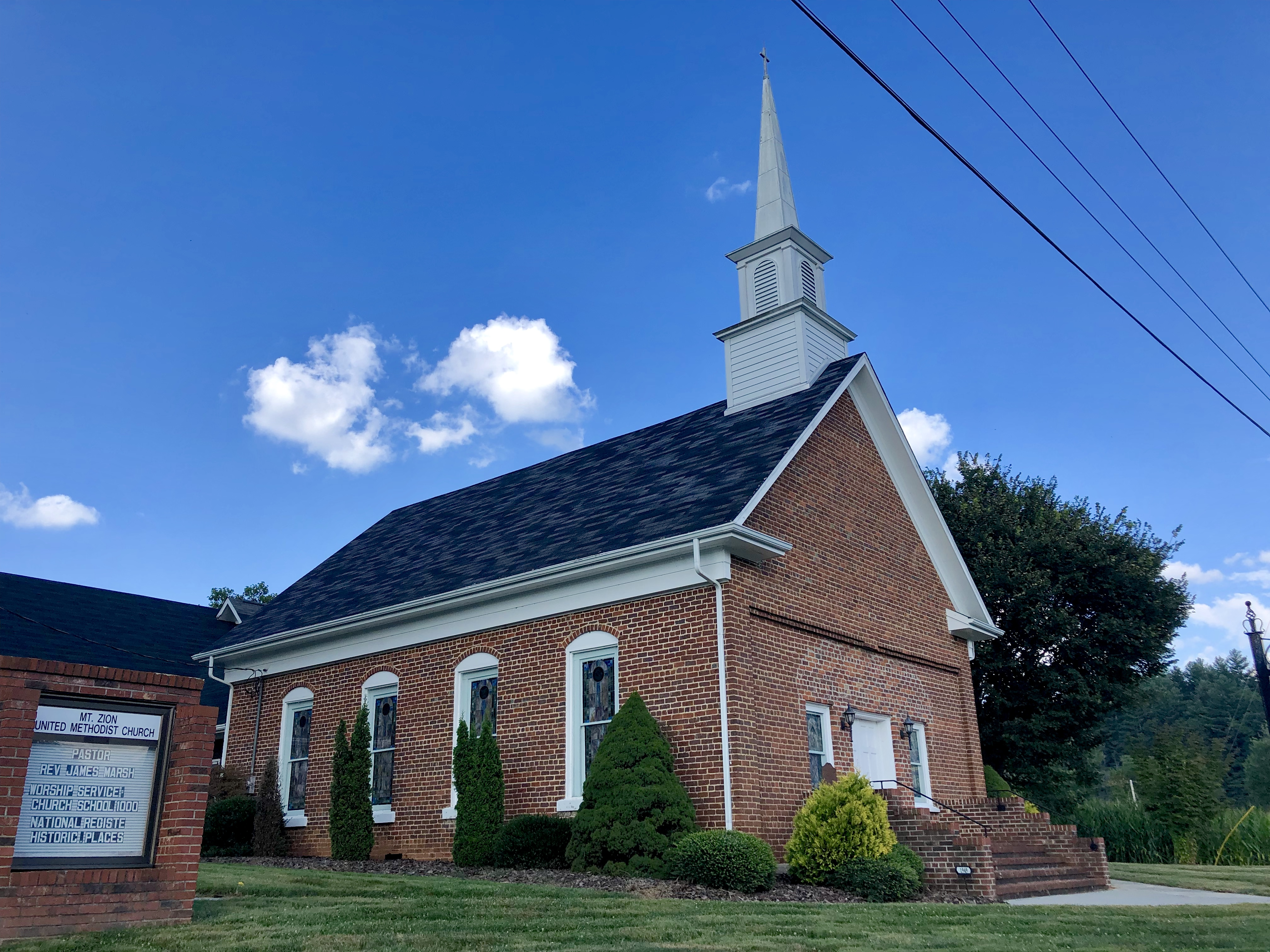
- The Church in September, 2019

- Location within North Carolina Location within the United States
- Location: SR 1503, near Crabtree, North Carolina
- Coordinates: 35°36′18″N 82°54′14″W
- Area: 0.4 acres (0.16 ha)
- Built: 1883
- Built by: Shank, Abner & Joe; Et al.
- NRHP reference No.: 86000156
- Added to NRHP: February 5, 1986

The Mount Zion United Methodist Church is a historic Methodist church located near Crabtree, Haywood County, North Carolina. It was built in 1883, and is a three bay by four bay rectangular gable front brick church. The church has been altered significantly during three separate rehabilitation projects undertaken since 1950. It is probably the oldest church building remaining in Haywood County.

It was listed on the National Register of Historic Places in 1986.
