= Mount Zion Baptist Church (Indianapolis) =

Historic Baptist church in Indianapolis

Coordinates: 39.8196°N 86.1631°W

Mount Zion Baptist Church is a historically African-American Baptist church Indianapolis, Indiana, United States. It is the only church in Indianapolis where Martin Luther King Jr. preached, and it did years of work in activism for the Black community of Indiana.

== History ==
In 1869, a group of former enslaved and free Black people left the Lick Creek Baptist Church to establish a church separately from Lick Creek. They were joined by the White Lick Creek Colored Baptist Church in the same year, forming Mount Zion Missionary Baptist Church. This location was in the Bridgeport neighborhood. The first pastor was Andrew Simms, serving starting in 1872. During this time, the congregation grew from 90 to 250 people. G. William Ward of Monumental Baptist Church of Chattanooga, Tennessee, took over in 1907, and the congregation grew to 1,000 members. The church moved locations after this to the west side of Indianapolis. After the move in 1921, Sandy B. Butler came to the church from Wichita, Kansas, and led until 1931. Marshall A. Talley took over upon Butler's death, and functioned as pastor until 1935, when he was elected to the Indiana General Assembly. R. T. Andrews Sr. took over in 1939. In 1951, the church began its move to a new building and started worshiping there in 1960. In 1961, Martin Luther King Jr. visited Indianapolis and preached at Mt. Zion to over 1,500 people as an NAACP meeting. The church was given an award by the NAACP in 1973 for its general work in activism and supporting the Black community in Indiana.
