= Mount Zion Baptist Church (Charlottesville, Virginia) =

Historic church in Virginia, United States

- U.S. National Register of Historic Places
- Virginia Landmarks Register
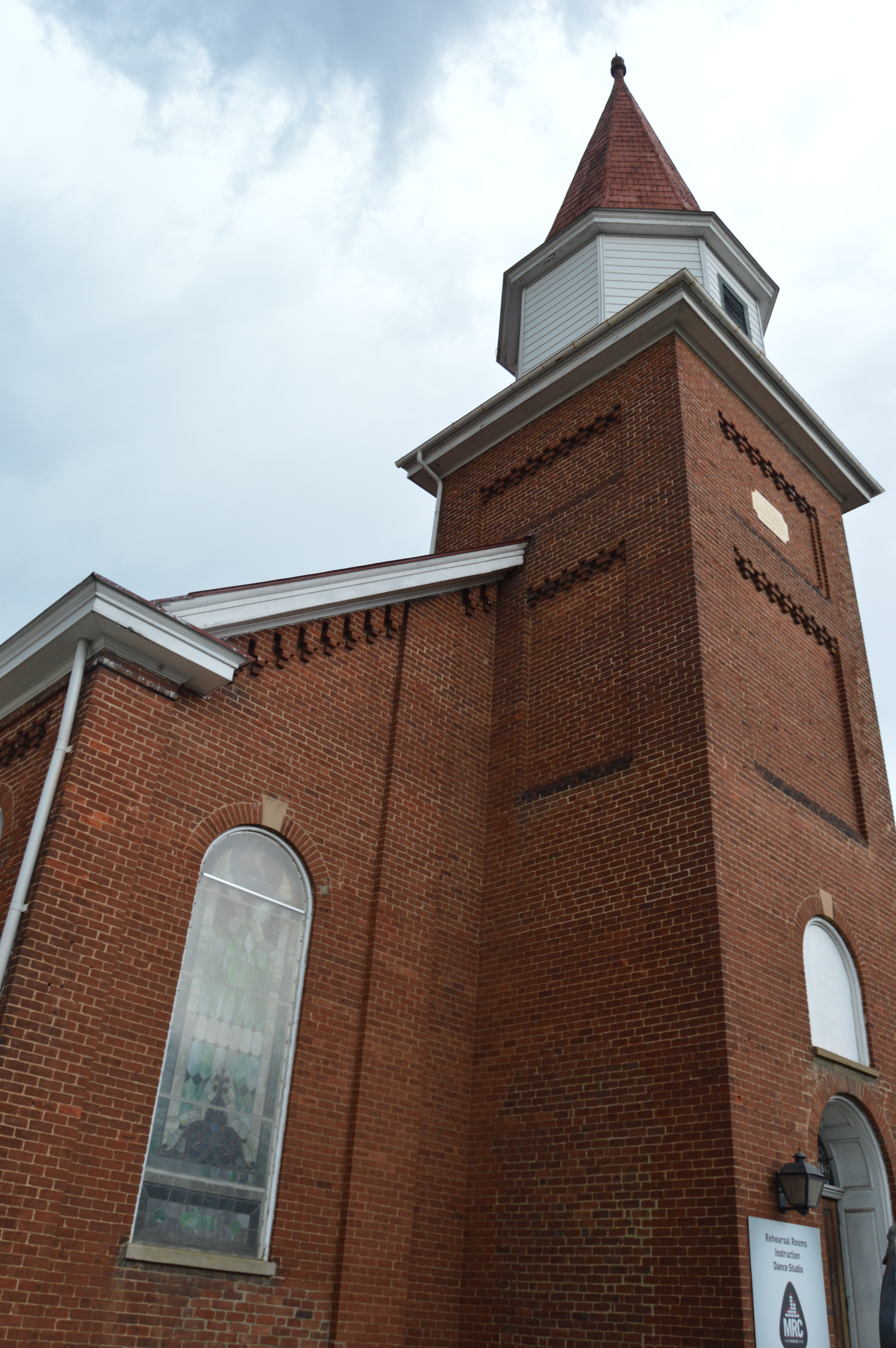
- Looking up from the base

- Location within Virginia Location within the United States
- Location: 105 Ridge St. Charlottesville, Virginia
- Coordinates: 38°1′48″N 78°29′10″W
- Architectural style: Classical Revival; Italianate
- NRHP reference No.: 92001388
- VLR No.: 104-0181

Significant dates
- Added to NRHP: October 15, 1992
- Designated VLR: June 19, 1991

Mount Zion is a historic Baptist church located at Charlottesville, Virginia. Although the current Mount Zion Baptist Church has only been in existence since 1884, the roots of the church are much deeper. The church began with a petition in 1864 to separate from the segregated white Baptist church, and the congregation was officially organized in 1867. Initially taking residence in the house of Samuel White, the congregation soon grew too large for the house, and in 1875 built a wooden church in the lot next door. In 1884, they finished the current, brick church that still stands today. The church was designed by George Wallace Spooner, who also helped rebuild the Rotunda at the University of Virginia.

The Mount Zion Baptist Church has also been used as a social and political hub for African Americans, existing through the periods of Jim Crow, the Civil Rights Movement, and Urban Renewal. The congregation is still in place today, and the church remains important to the local black community.

In 1966 the Minister of the Mount Zion Baptist Church was J.B. Hamilton and the Clerk was Mrs. Ethel P. Nicholas.

It was listed on the National Register of Historic Places in 1992.
