= Mount Zion Church (Big Sandy, Tennessee) =

Historic church in Tennessee, United States

- Formerly listed on the U.S. National Register of Historic Places
- Location within Tennessee Location within the United States
- Nearest city: Big Sandy, Tennessee
- Coordinates: 36°10′41″N 88°1′10″W
- Built: 1845
- NRHP reference No.: 73001752

Significant dates
- Added to NRHP: October 2, 1973
- Removed from NRHP: July 17, 2012

The Mount Zion Church was a historic church building near Big Sandy, Tennessee, USA. It was a hewn log structure built in either 1812 or 1845 and listed on the National Register of Historic Places in 1973. It was removed from the National Register in 2012.

This building, which is still standing, might be confused with the extant Mt. Zion Church and Cemetery located approximately 20 miles north in Henry County, Tennessee.

== History ==
The church building was a hewn log structure, approximately 18 feet (5.5 m) by 24 feet (7.3 m). It was built to house a Baptist congregation organized by B. S. Browning. The date of its completion has been given as either 1812, as suggested by a photo of the sign on the building, or as 1845 as listed in the National Register of Historic Places database. The builders were Joe Arnold, Eligh Hollaman, James Garner and another unknown person.

It was destroyed by fire in the early 1990s.
