= Mt. Zion Missionary Baptist Church (Hammond, Indiana) =

African-American Baptist church in the US

- Mt. Zion Missionary Baptist Church
- 41°35′58″N 87°30′10″W
- Location: Hammond, Indiana
- Address: 1047 Kenwood St
- Denomination: Baptist
- Website: historicmountzionmbc.org

History
- Status: Active
- Founded: 1919

Mt. Zion Missionary Baptist Church is a historically African-American Baptist church in Hammond, Indiana.

== History ==
Mt. Zion Church was established in 1919. Its location is an Indiana Landmark. Albert R. Burns Sr. was the pastor at this church for over 50 years, from 1945 to 1998, advocating for its Black congregation both in and out of the church. His daughter, Annie Burns-Hicks, became a teacher at Ball State University after the elder Burns succeeding in getting the right for Black people to teach in schools. A subsidiary of the church, the Mt. Zion Housing Authority, opened affordable senior citizen housing for Hammond's black community in 1983. Since 1998, William R. Collins has been the main pastor of the church.
