= Mount Zion Baptist Church (Athens, Ohio) =

Church building in Athens, Ohio, United States

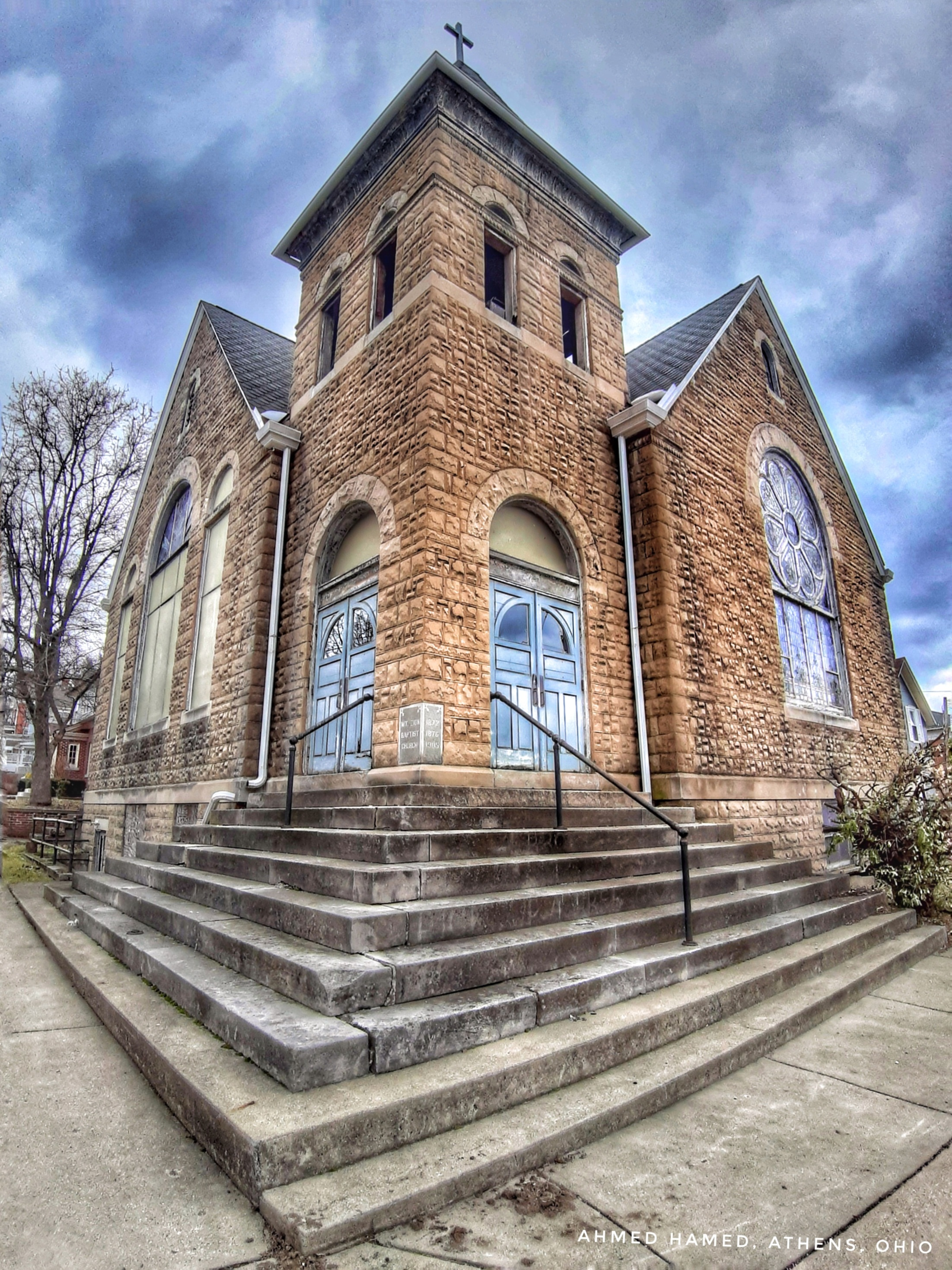

Religion
- Affiliation: Baptist Christian

Location
- Location: Athens, Ohio, United States
- Interactive map of Mount Zion Baptist Church

Architecture
- Groundbreaking: November 12, 1905
- Completed: 1909

The Mount Zion Baptist Church is a Baptist church in Athens, Ohio, which was frequently used as a meeting place for the Black community from its inception in 1905 until the 1990s. In 1980, the building was added to the National Register of Historic Places. It is the future home to The Mount Zion Black Cultural Center which is planned to open in 2026.

== Impact ==
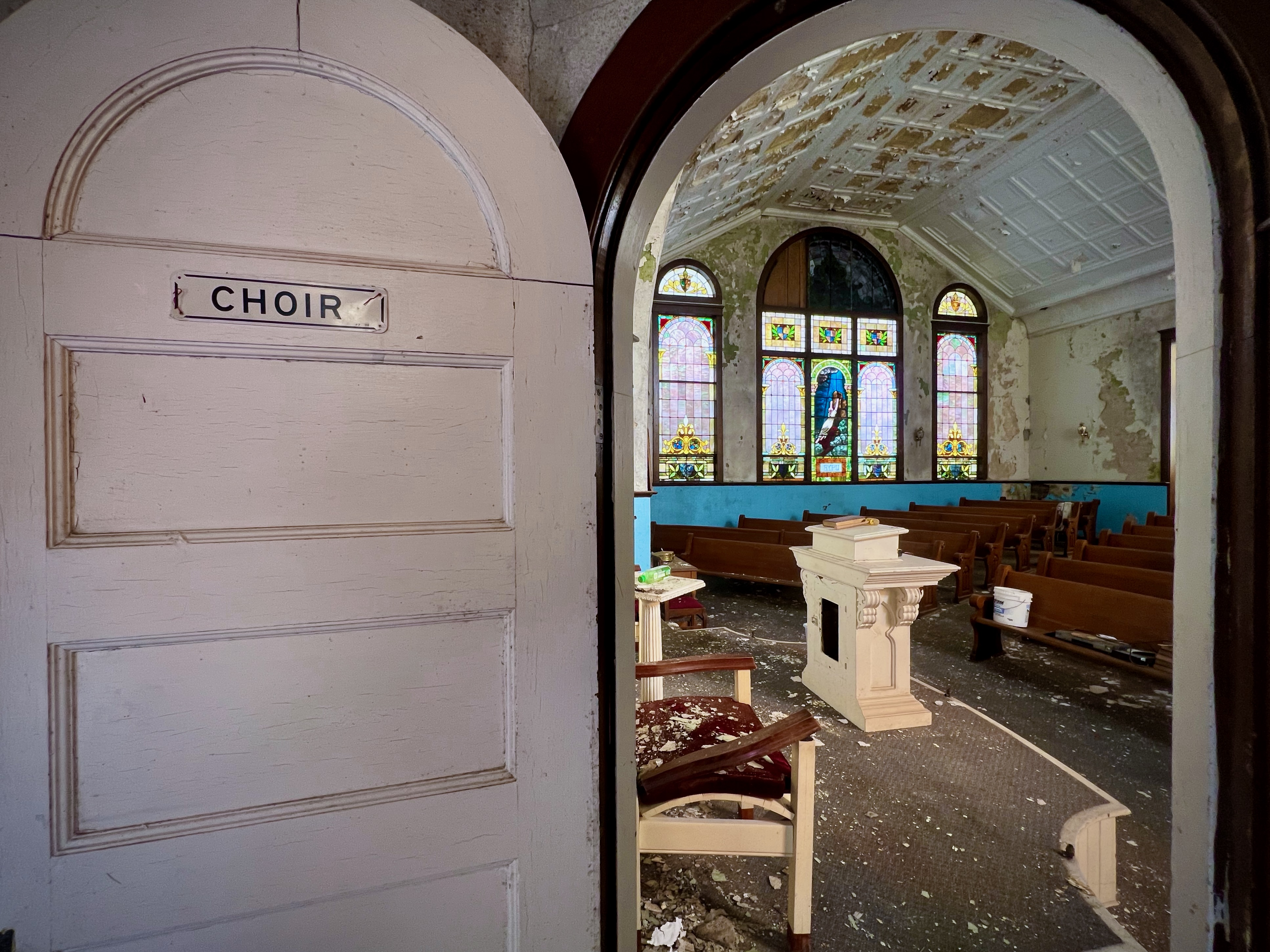
Mount Zion Baptist Church from the Choir room

Mount Zion Baptist Church has been more than a place of worship; it has been a cornerstone for the Black community's spiritual solace and social connection. At its public groundbreaking ceremony on November 12, 1905, copies of Black Ohio newspapers were placed within its cornerstone, emphasizing the church's mission to amplify the perspectives and accomplishments of Black Americans. Throughout the 20th century, Mount Zion served as a vital education hub, offering Bible classes and choir rehearsals as spaces free of cultural prejudice and racial discrimination. These activities provided opportunities for Black congregants to develop, hone, and expand their thought, speech, and voice.

== Historical timeline ==
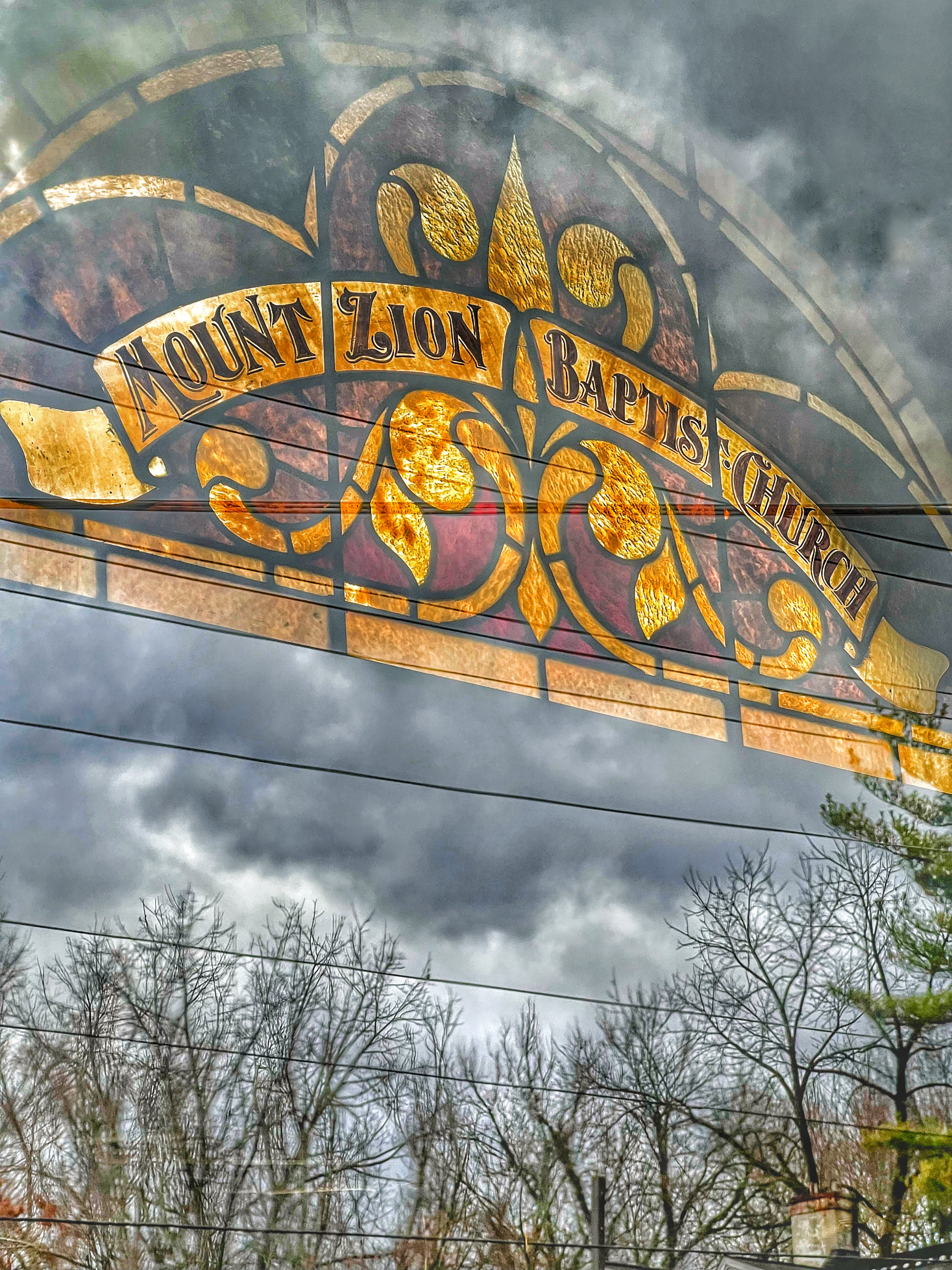
Mount Zion Baptist Church Stained glass

- 1872 – A small group of Black Athenians gather for religious services at the home of Joseph and Henrietta Miller.
- 1876 – Services held in a wood-framed single-room church on Lancaster Street.
- 1885 – Baptisms take place in the Hocking River before the new church building is constructed.
- 1902 – Edward and Mattie Berry donate a corner lot for the new building. The Berry Hotel, owned by the Berrys, was demolished in 1974.
- 1905 – Groundbreaking ceremony on September 12, with church services held in the basement starting in September.
- 1909 – The building is formally dedicated in a three-day ceremony in September.
- 1942 – Mount Zion Baptist Church had the honor of hosting Cab Calloway and his orchestra during their visit to Athens for the Ohio University Junior Prom on March 20. This event marked a notable cultural moment for the church and the broader community.
- 1974 – Gospel Voices of Faith choir is established under Dr. Francine Childs, marking a resurgence of the congregation.
- 1980 – The building is added to the National Register of Historic Places. Under number 80002938
- 1994 – Gospel Voices of Faith places 2nd in Gospel Fest, held in New York.
- 2000 - Last year there is a record of an active congregation existing
- 2006 - Funeral is the last known service in the building
- 2013 – Mt. Zion Baptist Church Preservation Society is formed with founding members Ada Woodson Adams, Ron Luce, Linda Philips, and Henry Woods.
- 2019 – The society is selected by the National Endowment for the Arts as one of three partner communities to work with the Citizens’ Institute on Rural Design.
- 2023 – Ahmed Hamed, a photographer from Cairo, Egypt, orchestrated a photo exhibition titled "Save Mount Zion Church." The purpose of this exhibition was to support the Mount Zion Preservation Society in fostering community awareness and solidarity for the restoration of the historic Mount Zion Church. The exhibition, which unfolded from October to December, was prominently hosted at the Athens Public Library. Additionally, a virtual version of the exhibition is accessible.

== The Mount Zion Black Cultural Center ==
After the congregation ceased to exist in the early 2000s, a group of concerned former members and other local residents including Ada Woodson Adams, Ron Luce, Linda Phillips, and Henry Woods founded the Mount Zion Baptist Church Preservation Society. In 2019, thanks to monies from the National Endowment for the Arts Citizens' Institute on Rural Design and a research report produced by Ohio University, College of Business students, plans were made for the restoration and reuse of the structure. Ideas for the reuse of the building include, using it as gathering space, a knowledge hub for the local African-American population, and as a site of heritage tourism.
