= Mount Zion Baptist Church (Tulsa) =

Historic church in Oklahoma, United States

- U.S. National Register of Historic Places
- U.S. National Register of Historic Places
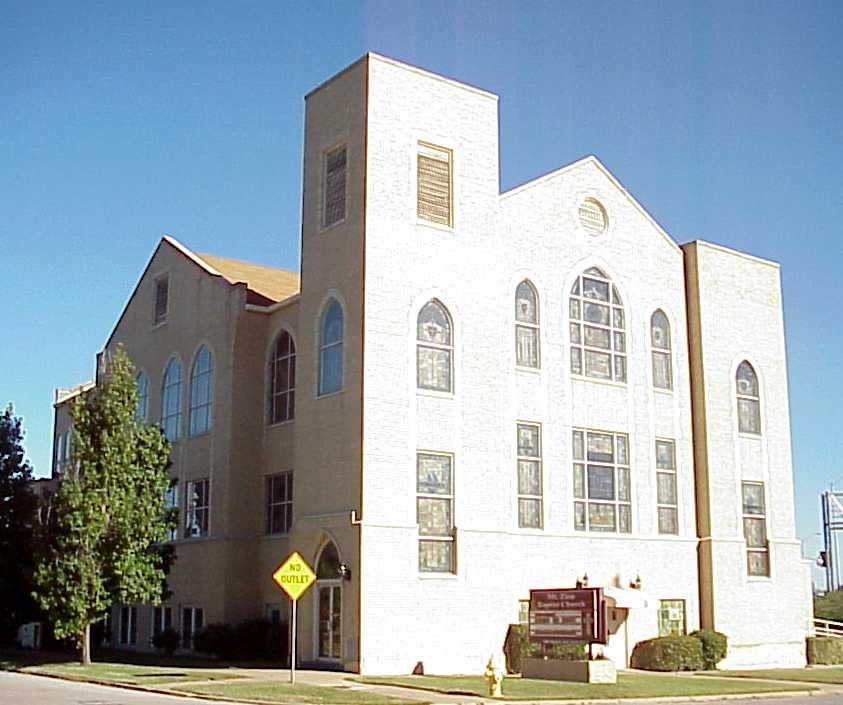
- Mount Zion Baptist Church in 2007

- Location within Oklahoma Location within the United States
- Location: 419 North Elgin Avenue Tulsa, Oklahoma
- Coordinates: 36°9′52″N 95°59′24″W
- Architect: W. S. and J. C. Latimer
- NRHP reference No.: 08000847
- Added to NRHP: September 5, 2008

Mount Zion Baptist Church is a historically significant church in the Greenwood District of Tulsa, Oklahoma. It was listed on the National Register of Historic Places on September 5, 2008. The original building was burned during the Tulsa race massacre on June 1, 1921. According to the Tulsa Preservation Commission, "... Mount Zion Baptist Church remains a testimony to the perseverance and tenacity of its congregants and the black community in Greenwood." The church building was rebuilt in 1952 on its original site.

== History ==
=== Genesis ===
In 1909, a religious study group led by Reverend Sandy Lyons organized the Second Baptist Church in a school in the 300 block of North Hartford in Tulsa. The group soon renamed their church as Mount Zion Baptist Church, bought a lot at 419 North Elgin and began planning to raise money for a permanent church building. Reverend R. A. Whitaker became pastor in 1914. About this time, the landlord of their rented building told the congregation that it was no longer available to them and gave them three days to move. The congregation moved to temporary quarters in a former dance hall on North Greenwood Avenue.

Reverend Whitaker led a campaign that raised $42,000 toward a permanent facility, far short of the estimated cost of $92,000. A local Jewish contractor offered an unsecured loan of $50,000. This enabled construction to begin in 1916. Completion took five years, and the first service was held in the new building on April 4, 1921.

=== Destruction ===
The Tulsa Race Massacre broke out on the night of May 31 - June 1, 1921. The new Mount Zion Baptist Church was deliberately burned by a mob of white men, who had heard a rumor that blacks were using the building to store rifles that had been brought there in caskets. No evidence of such storage ever surfaced. However, it was true that some armed blacks used the structure as a vantage point for firing on rioters that were attacking nearby houses. The whites could not dislodge the blacks until some local guardsmen brought up a truck with a machine gun and opened fire. This more powerful weaponry began knocking bricks out of the building, and it was soon in flames.

The building was a total loss. Furthermore, the insurance policy contained an escape clause that eliminated coverage for damages due to riot or rebellion. Additionally, as noted above, the congregation was already in debt for $50,000. The church had no choice but to declare bankruptcy. This action allowed the church to continue as an organization. Reverend Whitaker resigned because of ill health. A series of interim pastors followed before a Reverend Hamilton took over in 1928. The congregation soon split over the issue of whether to repay the $50,000 debt. Hamilton, and those who agreed with him, believed this was not a legal obligation because it was a loan in good faith and unsecured by any physical assets. Opponents contended that the loan should be repaid. Hamilton and his supporters resigned to form a new church, known as New Hope Baptist Church. The opposition remained as members of Mount Zion and began trying to repay the loan.

=== Recovery and rebuilding ===
Reverend J. H. Dotson became pastor in 1937. He brought in new members and raised $3,000 toward debt repayment within six months. He continued a vigorous fundraising campaign. The result was the full repayment of the old mortgage on November 23, 1942. Dotson then began raising funds to build a new building on the site.

Reverend Dotson closely supervised the construction of the new church building, which was designed by W. S. and J. C. Latimer. The Latimers were brothers, trained architects and members of Mount Zion. The new church building was dedicated in November 1952, twenty-five years after Reverend Dotson's arrival. At Dotson's request, the church called Reverend Calvin G. McCutchen as assistant pastor. McCutchen succeeded Dotson as pastor in 1957 and served until his retirement in 2007.
