= Old Zion Methodist Church =

Historic church in Kentucky, United States

- U.S. National Register of Historic Places
- Location within Kentucky Location within the United States
- Nearest city: Park City, Kentucky
- Coordinates: 36°59′0″N 86°3′53″W
- Area: less than one acre
- Built: 1856
- MPS: Barren County MRA
- NRHP reference No.: 83002541
- Added to NRHP: May 20, 1983

Old Zion Methodist Church is a historic church at Park City, Kentucky.

It was built in 1856 and added to the National Register of Historic Places in 1983.
