= Mount Zion Presbyterian Church (Sandy Springs, South Carolina) =

Coordinates: 34°35′29″N 82°45′33″W

Mt. Zion Presbyterian Church is located in Sandy Springs, South Carolina, USA. It is a part of the PCUSA denomination and is located in the Foothills Presbytery of the Synod of South Atlantic.

== Background ==
In the early 19th century, Sandy Springs residents, mainly Scotch-Irish pioneers, periodically gathered for a camp meeting at a spring located nearby; but for regular weekly worship, they traveled to Anderson's Presbyterian Church. In 1832, a request was made and granted to establish a local Presbyterian church, to be known as Sandy Spring Presbyterian Church. The church building, a frame structure, was erected at Mt. Zion's present site on land donated by Mr. Archibald McElroy. In 1842, the Presbytery changed the name to Mount Zion Presbyterian Church.

Church records indicate that in 1834 the church had 40 members.

During the Civil War years from 1861–1863, no records were kept, and some of the early records of the church were destroyed by fire. There were also years when the church was vacant (meaning that no minister served it in any capacity). In spite of this, the Sunday School was maintained.

There are two known Civil War graves in the church cemetery. James Waddell Hillhouse (20 April 1822 - 22 July 1861), son of the Rev. Joseph Hillhouse, and Michael Alexander Bellotte (1 January 1830 - 24 July 1861), son of Jacob Bellotte, an elder in Mt. Zion's first session, died from injuries in the first Battle of Manassas. They served together in the 4th SC Regiment, and died from the accidental discharge of a shell.

== Change Of Location ==
Hoping to increase the membership, the congregation of Mt. Zion voted in 1867 to move to a site near the railroad and about one half mile east of the original location. Later, on August 26, 1876, the building was sold, and the members decided to hold services at the old Grange Hall about three miles southwest of the Sandy Springs crossroads.

In 1882, under the leadership of Dr. J. B. Adger and his son, Mr. John Adger, a drive was started to raise funds to construct a new church building. Mr. John Adger was instrumental in beginning the movement when he was successful in collecting $250.00, the first money contributed to the building of the present Mt. Zion Church. In 1884 a Building Committee was formed which consisted of the following men: T. R. Simpson, W. J. Erwin, Alfred Benjamin Bowden, James Dickson McElroy and T. E. Dickson. When the church was completed, the total cost in cash was $800.00.

As was the custom in Presbyterian polity toward the end of the 19th century and the early 20th century, the church did not hesitate to call before the Session any member who was guilty of breaking a commandment. The accused party was given a chance to confess and ask forgiveness for his or her sin. After due consideration by the Session, a decision was made whether a suspension or vindication was in order. Records show that most parties confessed, asked forgiveness, and were vindicated.

== Major Times ==
The United States entered World War I on 6 April 1917. President Woodrow Wilson had worked hard for the nation's peace but to no avail. It was his hope that the involvement of the United States might help to "make the world safe for democracy." At this time the people of Mt. Zion displayed a high plane of patriotic sentiment. Young men volunteered for or were drafted into the armed forces. The women rolled bandages, made hospital garments, and took cookies, cakes, and sandwiches to soldiers who came through Sandy Springs on troop trains.

When the Great Depression hit America. Banks closed, businesses failed, people were without jobs. The churches, as well as individuals, were affected keenly by this period of disaster and despair. "The Lord's acre" was encouraged by Mt. Zion. The farmer set aside a good acre of land, planted a crop on it, gave it special attention, sold the crop, and then gave all proceeds to the church. Times were hard and money scarce so this project was most beneficial to the financial status of the church.

== Expansion ==
It was not until 1950 that plans for the Educational Building were drawn. Realization of the dream of expanded facilities came slowly. Construction was done on a time and materials basis as funds became available. Some labor was hired and the congregation donated some. The building of concrete blocks and brick veneer, which cost $8,000, is 54 feet long and 30 feet wide. It contains an assembly room, complete with cheerful fireplace, a kitchen, four Sunday school rooms and two rest rooms.

Although the Educational Building had been completed nearly two years previously, it was not until August 4, 1957, that it was officially dedicated during a Homecoming commemorating the 125th anniversary of the founding of the church.

In 1996, the church leased church property for a county park. The land was cleared, and a pavilion, playground, and walking track were built and are still enjoyed by the community today.

Mt. Zion continues to be an active congregation and an active part of the Sandy Springs Community.

== Sources used ==
- History - Mt. Zion Presbyterian Church - Presbyterian Church (USA) Archives, Columbia Theological Seminary, Decatur, GA
- A Dipper of Reflections from Sandy Springs - Pendleton Historical Commission, Pendleton, SC and Anderson County, SC Library
- "My Life and Times 1810-1899" by John B. Adger, D.D., Whitten & Shepperson, Richmond, VA, 1899
- MilitaryHistoryOnline.com
