= Mount Zion Missionary Baptist Church (Pensacola, Florida) =

Historic place in Florida, United States

- U.S. National Register of Historic Places
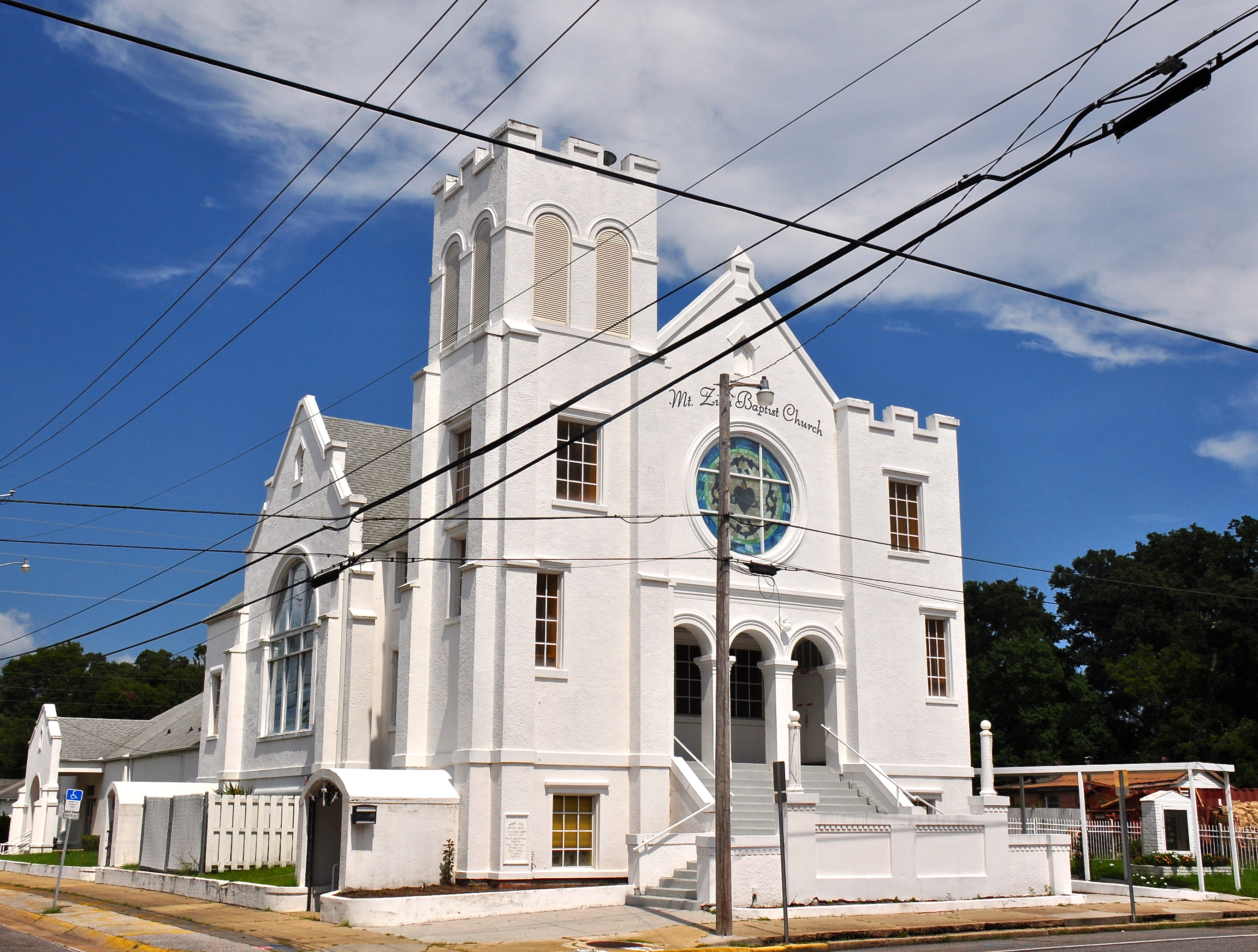
- Mount Zion Missionary Baptist Church, September 2014.

- Location within Florida Location within the United States
- Location: Pensacola, Florida
- Coordinates: 30°25′05″N 87°13′28″W
- Built: 1918
- Architect: Wallace Rayfield
- Architectural style: Eclecticism
- NRHP reference No.: 13000963
- Added to NRHP: December 24, 2013

Mount Zion Missionary Baptist Church is a national historic site located at 528 West Jackson Street, Pensacola, Florida in Escambia County. It is the second oldest black Baptist church in Pensacola. It was added to the National Register of Historic Places on December 24, 2013.

== History ==
In 1880, the Mt. Zion Missionary Baptist Church broke away from the John the Baptist Church over a philosophical dispute. Reverend H.E. Jones led a campaign to construct a new church and enlisted Wallace Rayfield to design it. In 1944 and 1945, the church's Reverend R.A. Cromwell successfully challenged the all-white Democratic primary in Florida.
