= Mount Zion African Methodist Episcopal Church =

Mt. Zion African Methodist Episcopal Church, Mt. Zion A.M.E. Church or other variants thereof, may refer to:

- Mount Zion AME Zion Church (Montgomery, Alabama)
- Mount Zion AME Church (Jacksonville, Florida)
- Mount Zion A.M.E. Church (Ocala, Florida)
- Mount Zion African Methodist Episcopal Church (Montgomery Township, New Jersey)
- Mount Zion African Methodist Episcopal Church and Mount Zion Cemetery, Woolwich, New Jersey
- Mount Zion A.M.E. Church (Tredyffrin Township, Pennsylvania)
- Mount Zion AME Church (Greeleyville, South Carolina)

== See also ==
- Mount Zion Church (disambiguation)
