= Mount Zion Baptist Church (Martinsburg, West Virginia) =

Historic church in West Virginia, United States

- U.S. National Register of Historic Places
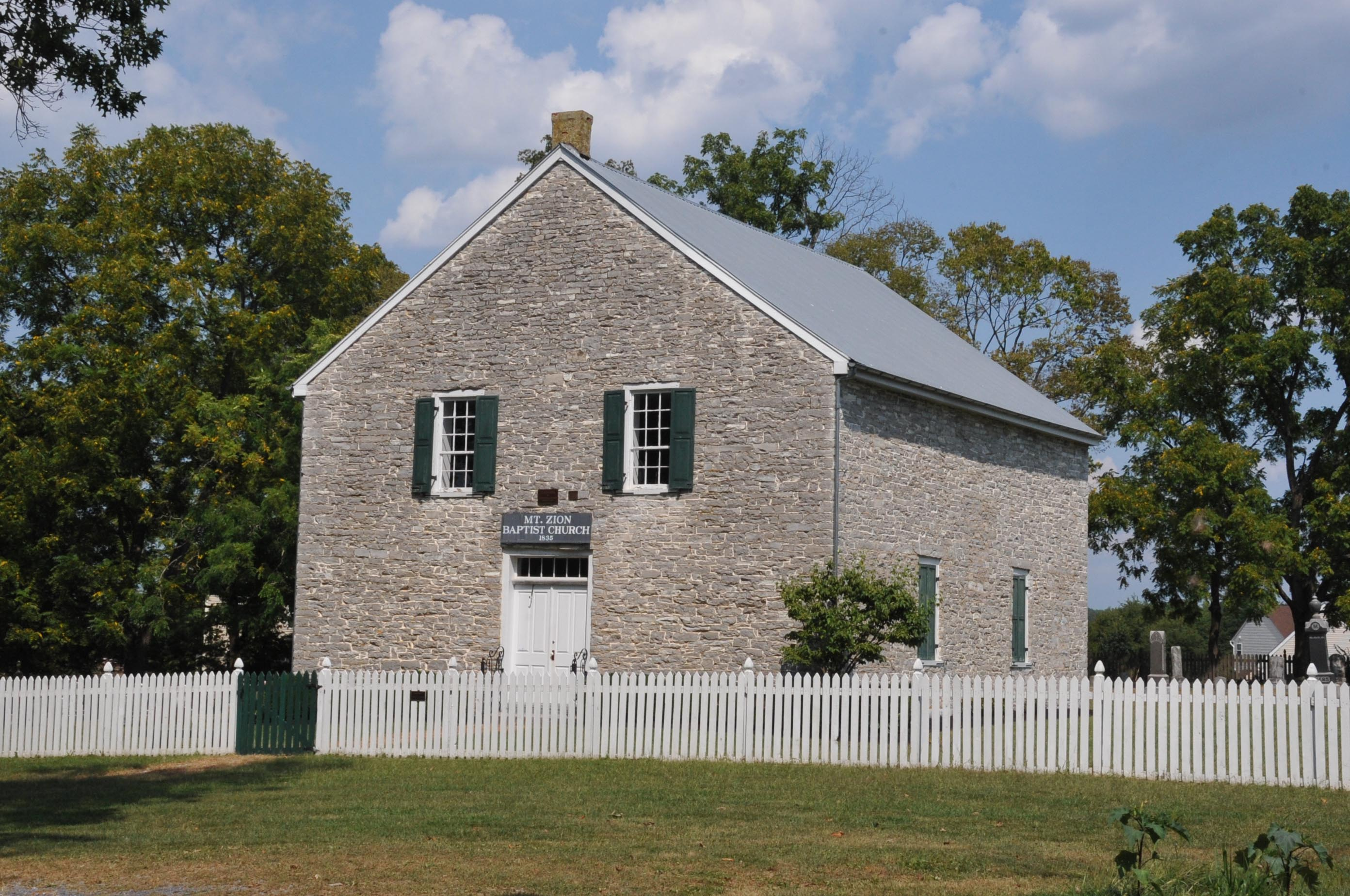

- Location within West Virginia Location within the United States
- Location: Opequon Lane, Berkeley County
- Coordinates: 39°23′19″N 77°55′25″W
- Area: 3 acres (1.2 ha)
- MPS: Berkeley County MRA
- NRHP reference No.: 80004422
- Added to NRHP: December 10, 1980

Mount Zion Baptist Church is a historic church on Opequon Lane in Martinsburg, West Virginia.

Built during 1836–38, 35 by 40 square feet (3.3 m^{2} × 3.7 m^{2}) in plan, with stonework "unequalled" in Berkeley County. As of 1980 the church was in use only about once yearly.

It was added to the National Register of Historic Places in 1980.
