= Mount Zion Baptist Church (Wood County, West Virginia) =

Church in Wood County, West Virginia, US

Coordinates: 39°10′26.7″N 81°30′22.3″W

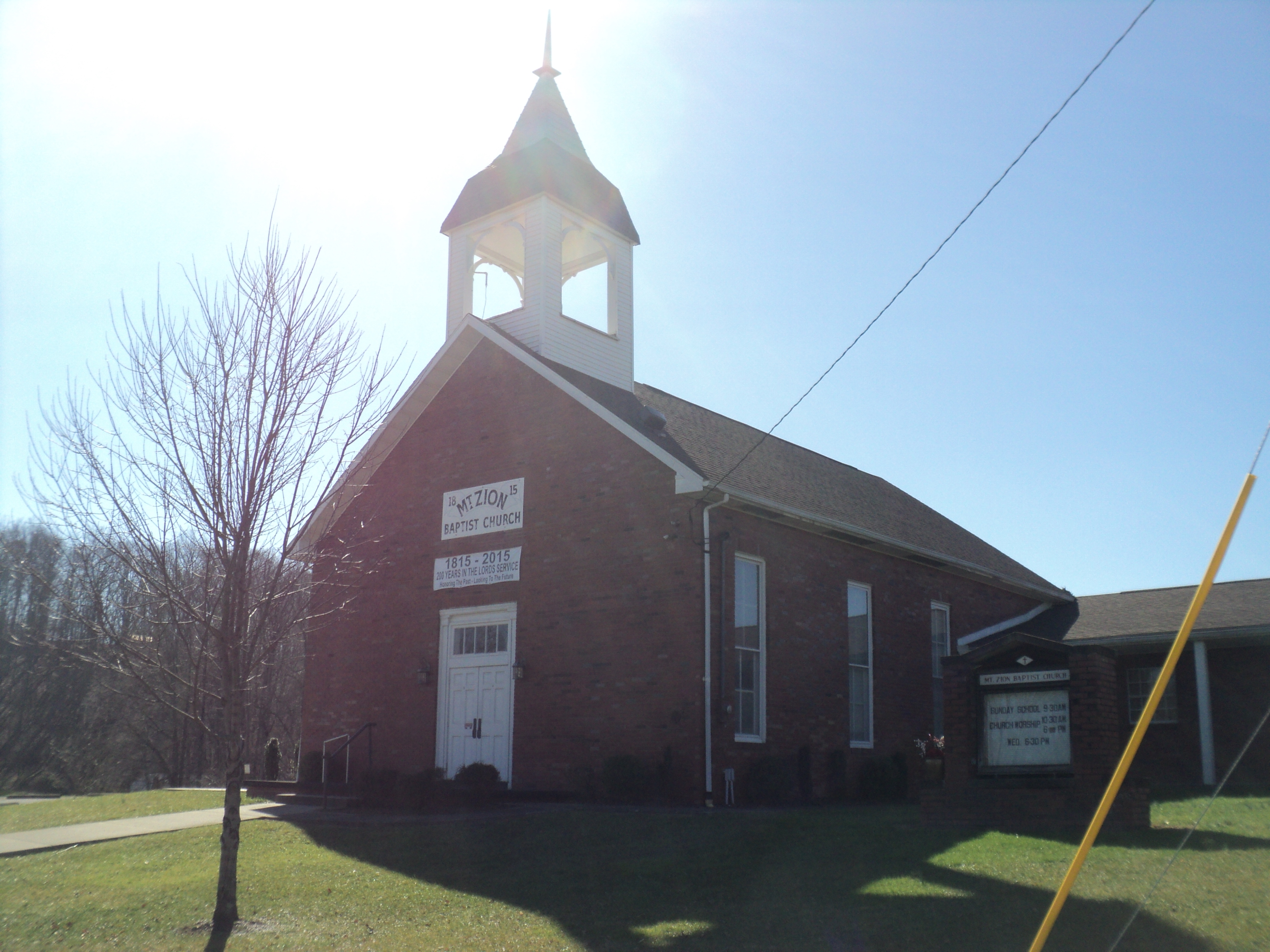
Mount Zion Baptist Church

Mount Zion Baptist Church, Wood County, West Virginia was founded in 1815 in the community of Mineral Wells, West Virginia on Route 14. On May 15, 1815, Mrs. Elizabeth Kettle opened her home for the organization of this frontier baptist church. The church first called Rev. John Drake to an area then called Butcher Bend. A missionary, Rev. Drake came to the area on foot, carrying a musket and a bible. Later Rev. James McAbbey built the first church made of logs in 1819. Then in 1883 the present building was constructed.

This church claims to be the mother church of at least seven other Baptist churches in the area.
