= Mount Zion Presbyterian Church (Chandlersville, Ohio) =

Historic church in Ohio, United States

- U.S. National Register of Historic Places
- Location within Ohio Location within the United States
- Nearest city: Chandlersville, Ohio
- Coordinates: 39°51′45″N 81°44′59″W
- Area: less than one acre
- Built: 1864
- NRHP reference No.: 78002152
- Added to NRHP: December 19, 1978

Mount Zion Presbyterian Church is a historic church in Chandlersville, Ohio.

It was built in 1864 and added to the National Register of Historic Places in 1978.
