= Mount Zion Missionary Baptist Church (Fayetteville, Tennessee) =

Historic church in Tennessee, United States

- U.S. National Register of Historic Places
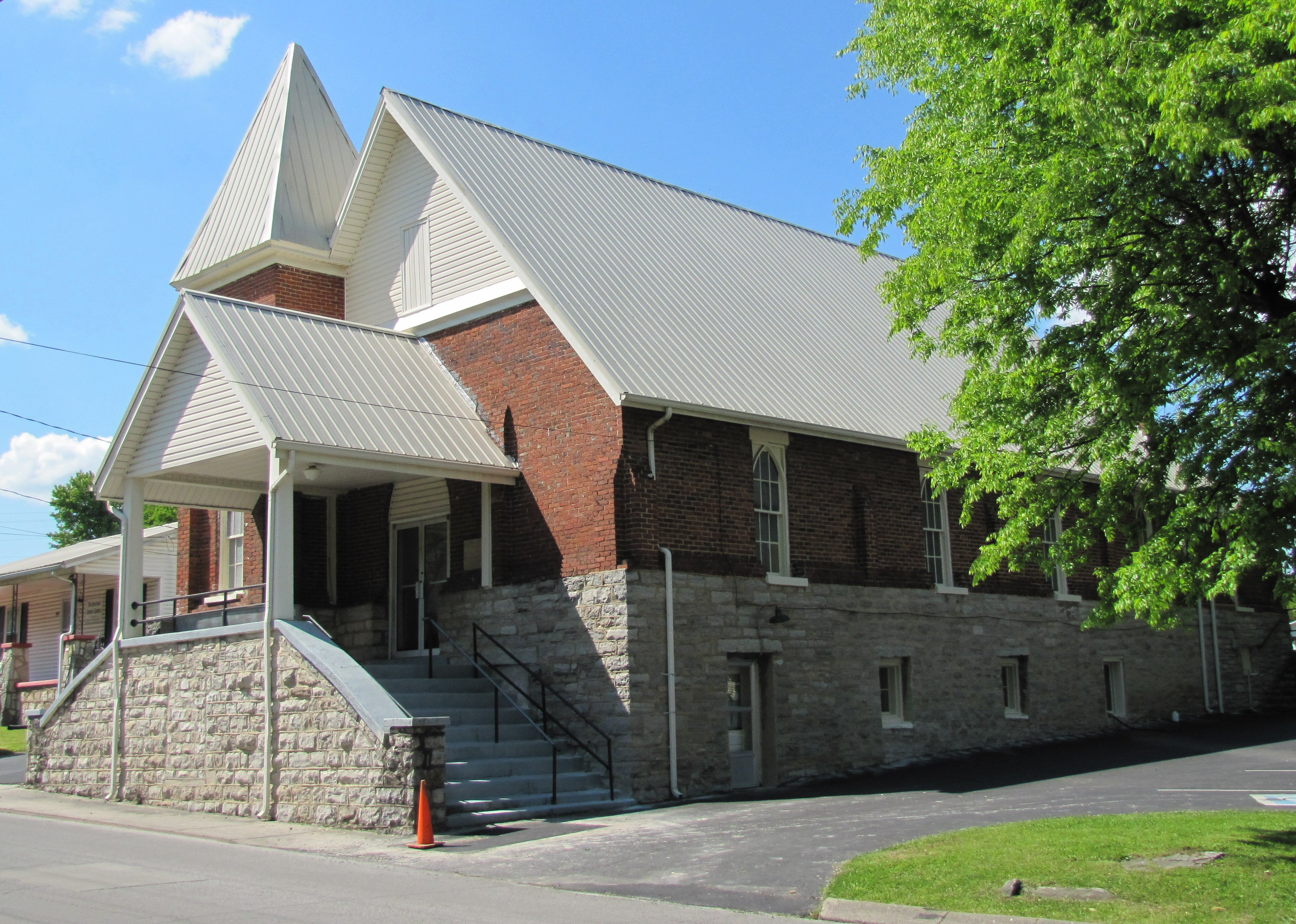

- Location within Tennessee Location within the United States
- Location: 305 W. Maple St., Fayetteville, Tennessee
- Coordinates: 35°9′0″N 86°34′26″W
- Area: less than one acre
- Built: 1902
- Architectural style: Gothic Revival
- MPS: Rural African-American Churches in Tennessee MPS
- NRHP reference No.: 00000731
- Added to NRHP: July 06, 2000

Mount Zion Missionary Baptist Church is a historic African-American church at 305 W. Maple Street in Fayetteville, Tennessee.

Mt. Zion Church was organized in 1873 by former slaves and sons of slaves. The land for the church building was purchased that same year.

The current church building was built in 1902 after an earlier building was destroyed by fire. It is a two-story brick and stone building of Gothic Revival design. It was the site of Lincoln County organizational meetings for the NAACP.

The church building was added to the National Register of Historic Places in 2000.
