= Mount Zion United Methodist Church =

Mount Zion United Methodist Church may refer to:

- Mount Zion United Methodist Church (Washington, D.C.), listed on the U.S. National Register of Historic Places
- Mount Zion United Methodist Church (Ellicott City, Maryland)
- Mount Zion United Methodist Church (Crabtree, North Carolina), NRHP-listed
- Mount Zion United Methodist Church (Belton, Texas), NRHP-listed
