= Mount Zion Methodist Episcopal Church South =

Historic church in Tennessee, United States

- U.S. National Register of Historic Places
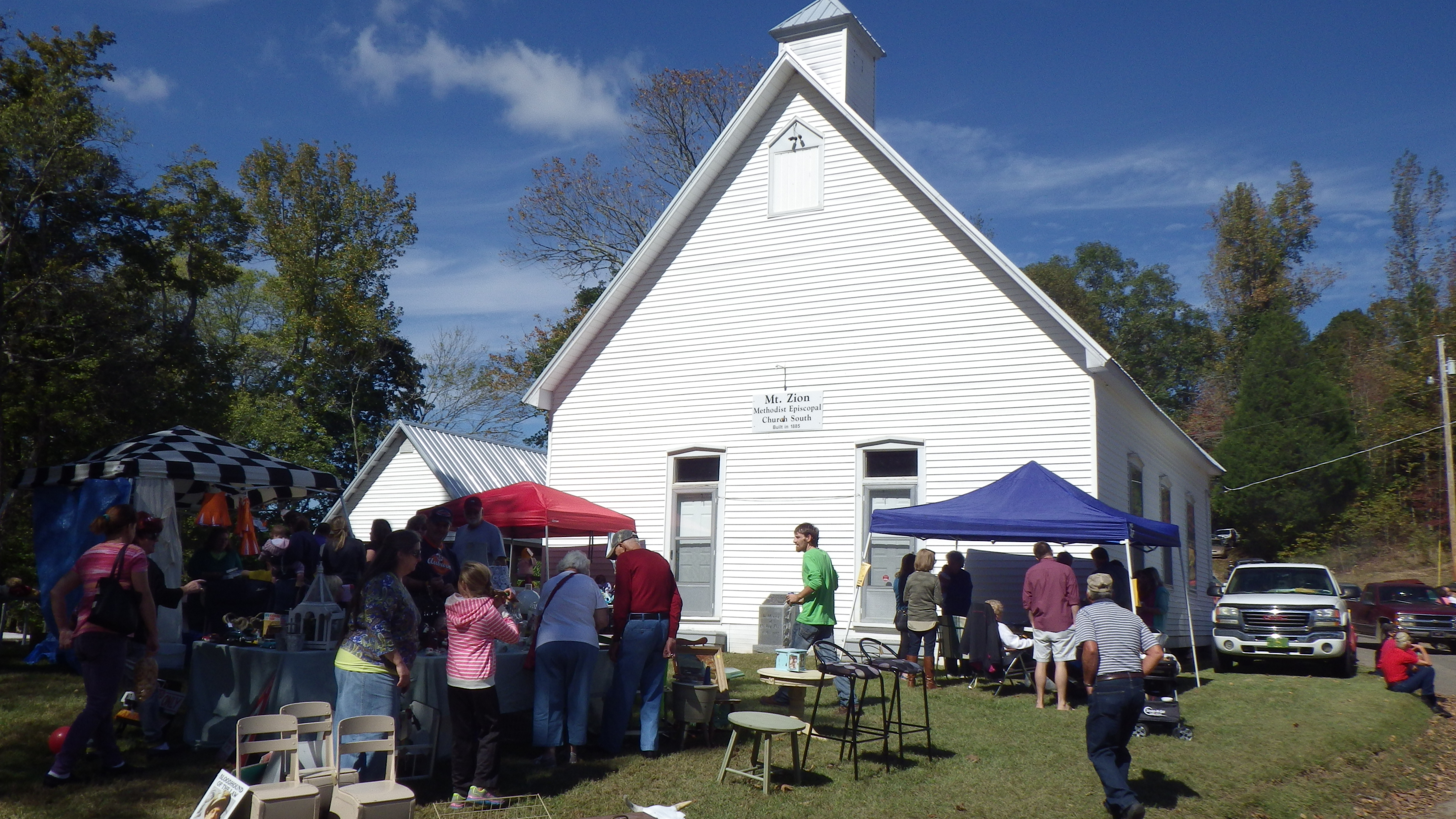

- Location within Tennessee Location within the United States
- Nearest city: Fall River, Tennessee
- Coordinates: 35.06529°N 87.23259°W
- Area: 1 acre (0.40 ha)
- Built: 1885
- Architect: James Bassham
- NRHP reference No.: 88000201
- Added to NRHP: March 10, 1988

Mount Zion Methodist Episcopal Church South, also known as Mount Zion United Methodist Church, is a historic church in Lawrence County, Tennessee, near the Fall River community.

It was built in 1885, replacing a log church that was destroyed in a fire. It was added to the National Register of Historic Places in 1988.
