= Mt. Zion Church and Cemetery (Elkhorn, Tennessee) =

Historic site in Henry County, Tennessee

- U.S. National Register of Historic Places
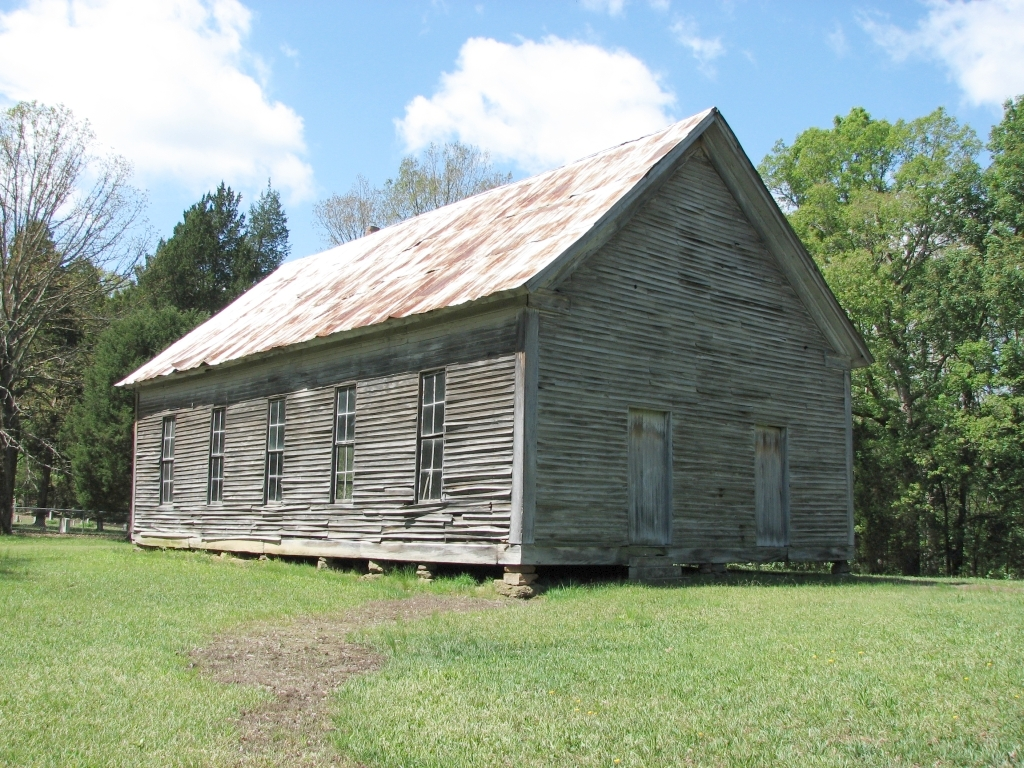

- Location within Tennessee Location within the United States
- Nearest city: Elkhorn, Tennessee
- Coordinates: 36°22′18″N 88°2′31″W
- Area: 2.7 acres (1.1 ha)
- Built: 1893
- NRHP reference No.: 74001916
- Added to NRHP: December 23, 1974

Mt. Zion Church and Cemetery (United Baptist Church) is a historic church building near Elkhorn, Henry County, Tennessee, United States. It was built sometime between 1872 and 1899, most likely in 1893, and added to the National Register of Historic Places in 1974. It is the only surviving building in the "Old 23rd District" of Henry County, an extinct community since 1944.

This building might be confused with Mount Zion Church located approximately twenty miles south near Big Sandy, Benton County, Tennessee, which was destroyed by fire in the 1990s, possibly 1992.

== Location ==
The building is on a small, remote peninsula colloquially referred to as the "Old 23rd District." Today, this land is part of the Big Sandy Unit of the Tennessee National Wildlife Refuge. Between about 1821 and 1944, a small community of families lived and farmed there. Besides farming, the community produced timber and lumber, railroad cross ties and cleaned mussel shells for the button-making industry. The remote location also made moonshining quite lucrative. In the community, there were two churches, two or three stores, a sawmill and a post office at various times. The first post office was Gillie, Tennessee, established in 1888 and absorbed by Pace, Tennessee in 1899. Pace, Tennessee was established in 1890 and absorbed by a rural route out of Big Sandy in Benton County, Tennessee in 1904.

In 1938, the Tennessee Valley Authority (TVA) began construction of Kentucky Dam on the Tennessee River. Impounding the river meant that flood waters would consume a large part of the community, so in 1940, TVA began buying out property and moving all families out of the area. Buildings below the flood level were given to their prior owners and buildings above the flood level were auctioned off. All buildings had to be moved out by a certain date after which TVA burned what remained. Timber below the flood level was cut and burned on a tight schedule, preventing much of its use to sawmillers. Cemeteries that would be flooded or whose access would be flooded were surveyed, next of kin contacted, and decisions made on removal and relocation or remaining in place.

The Mt. Zion Church building and cemetery exist well above the flood level therefore they enjoyed some special treatment. When TVA purchased the site, an agreement was made with the church trustees to leave the building standing and allow the congregation to meet there annually for a homecoming. This homecoming still occurs on the first Sunday in July of each year.

== History ==
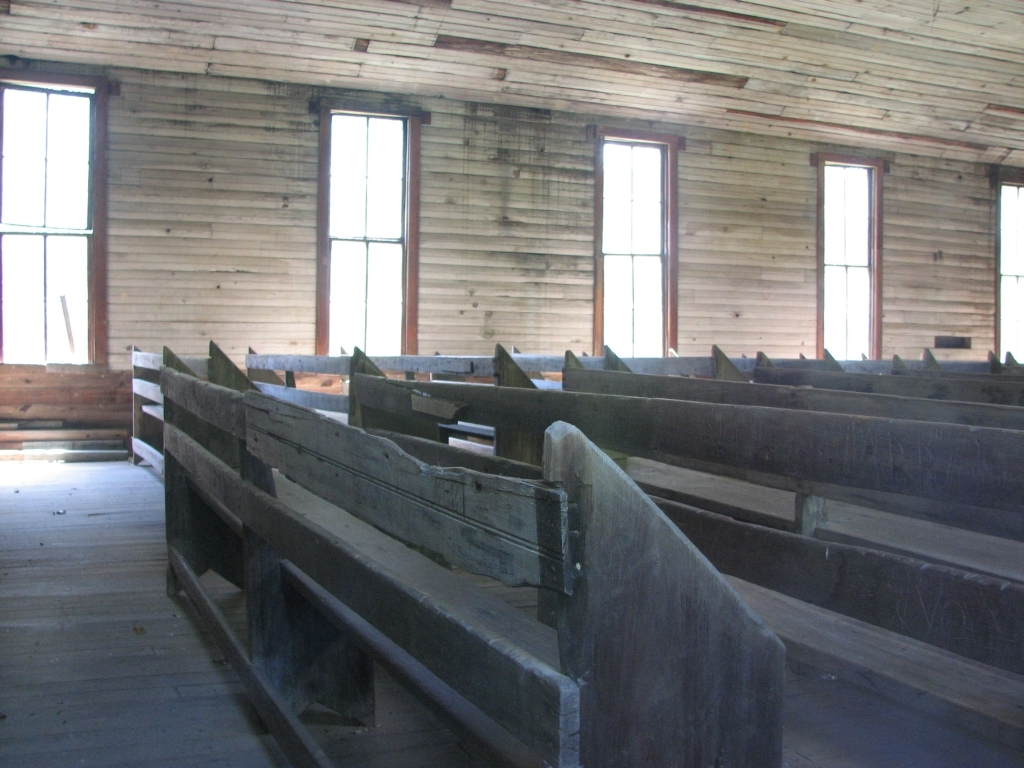
Benches of Mt. Zion Church, 28 April 2007

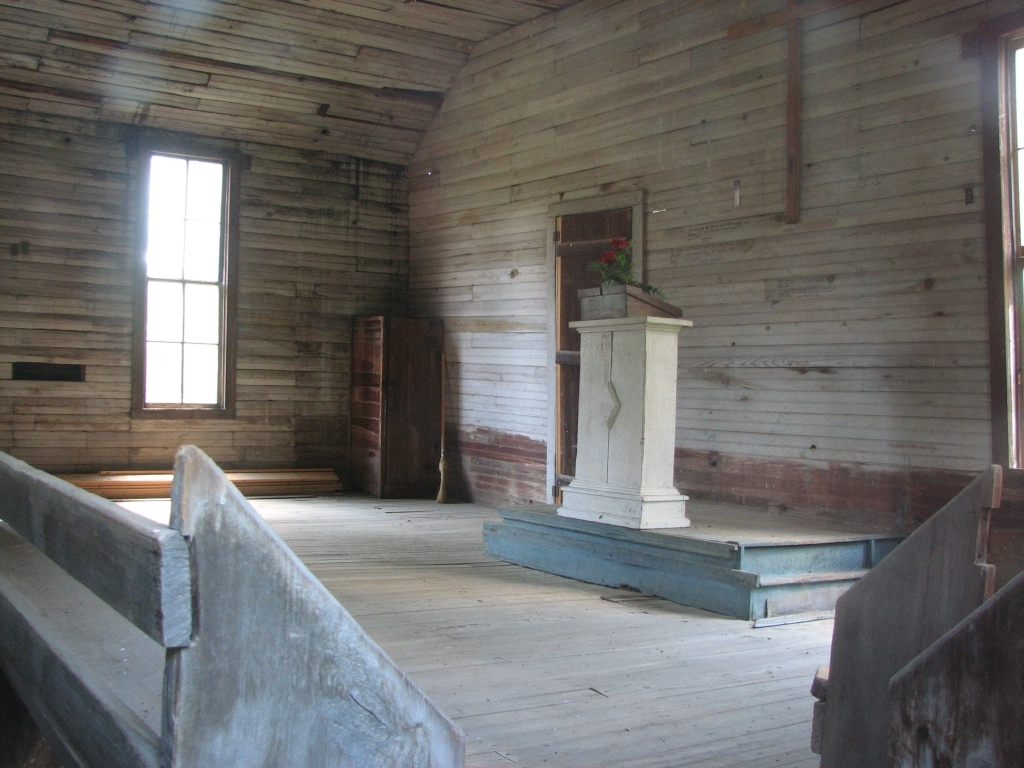
Pulpit of Mt. Zion Church, 28 April 2007

Mt. Zion Church may have first met in 1829. It petitioned to and was accepted by the Western District Baptist Association in 1853.

The first church building was a log structure built on land donated by James Monroe Gray. It stood across the road from the current building and was also used as a school. It was torn down sometime between 1890 and 1900.

Land for the current building was donated by Rhoda Gray McDaniel, daughter of James Monroe Gray. In the Pictorial History of the Old 23rd District, Larry T. Perry states that the current church was built in 1897, however the National Register of Historical Places has listed 1893. Entries in the Western District Association minutes list also 1872, 1896 and 1899 as dates of construction for the current building.

Pastors included pillars of the local community such as James Monroe Gray, Buck Williams and Frank Robbins but also W. W. Dickerson, who lived about 50 miles (80 km) away in Murray, Kentucky. Dickerson served Mt. Zion for 18 years and never lived within the church community. Every Saturday, he would come to Paris where he was met by a member of the congregation and taken back to the community. He would spend the night with a church family, preach on Sunday morning and then leave on Sunday afternoon with some farm produce given by church members.

In 1896 and 1938, the Western District Association held their annual conferences at the Mt. Zion church.

By 1943, the church was without a pastor and in the process of disbanding. TVA purchased the church building and the 2.7 acres (1.1 ha) on which it stood for $1006. They agreed with the church trustees, Isham Robbins, T. J. Fielder and W. C. Flowers, to leave the building standing and to allow the congregation to meet there annually for a homecoming. The last report was sent to the Association in 1944.

Mt. Zion Church had an irregular representation and report in the Association minutes. However spotty these reports may be, they are the most tangible way to understand the size and impact the church had upon its community. The following aggregate data is taken from Perry's book.

Year	Pastor	Pastor's Salary	Membership	Property Value
1853	James Monroe Gray of Mouth of Sandy, Tennessee		24	
1890	P. I. Summers of Gillie, Tennessee		32	
1894	W. Buck Williams of Sip, Tennessee		44	
1895			79	
1896	W. Buck Williams	$40	80	$355
1897		$25		
1898			102	
1899			115	
1900			117	
1901			120	
1902	D. T. Spaulding		117	$450
1904	T. B. Holcomb			
1906	A. M. Hawley of Big Sandy, Tennessee		123	
1907			124	
1908			134	
1909	No Pastor		124	
1910			146	$400
1911	A. M. Hawley		157	
1912			193	
1913			188	
1915	A. M. Hawley			
1917	A. M. Hawley		93	$1000
1919	Henry Frank Robbins		105	
1920	No Pastor		110	
1921	Will Jones	$60.5	102	
1923	No Pastor			
1924	W. W. Dickerson of Murray, Kentucky	$73.13		
1925	W. W. Dickerson		112	
1926	W. W. Dickerson	$125	112	$500
1927	W. W. Dickerson	$150	111	
1928	W. W. Dickerson		111	
1929	W. W. Dickerson	$120	108	
1930	W. W. Dickerson		150	$800
1931	W. W. Dickerson		101	$300
1932	W. W. Dickerson	$100	104	
1933	W. W. Dickerson	$80	127	
1934	W. W. Dickerson		135	$100
1935	W. W. Dickerson	$100	120	
1936	W. W. Dickerson	$100	60	$200
1937	W. W. Dickerson	$125	59	
1938	W. W. Dickerson	$182.25	59	$400
1940	W. W. Dickerson	$266.81	71	
1941	W. W. Dickerson	$267.9	78	$1000
1942	No Pastor		71	
1943	No Pastor		70 (50 are non-resident)	$1006 sold to TVA
1944	No Pastor		49 (46 are non-resident)	

== Cemetery ==
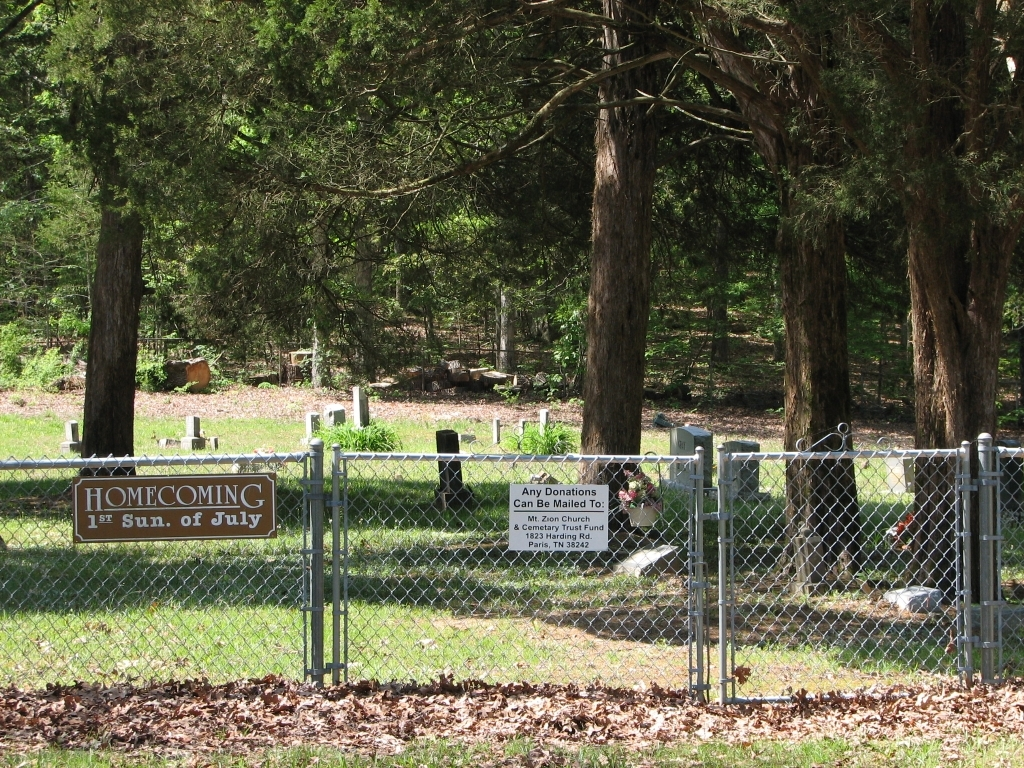
Entrance to Mt. Zion Cemetery, 28 April 2007

The Mt. Zion cemetery is located just behind, to the west of the church building. It is surrounded by a chain link fence and is regularly cared for. As of April 2007, there were 222 graves known. Burials still occur there.
