= Mount Zion African Methodist Episcopal Church and Mount Zion Cemetery =

Church and cemetery in Woolwich Township, New Jersey, U.S.

- U.S. National Register of Historic Places
- New Jersey Register of Historic Places
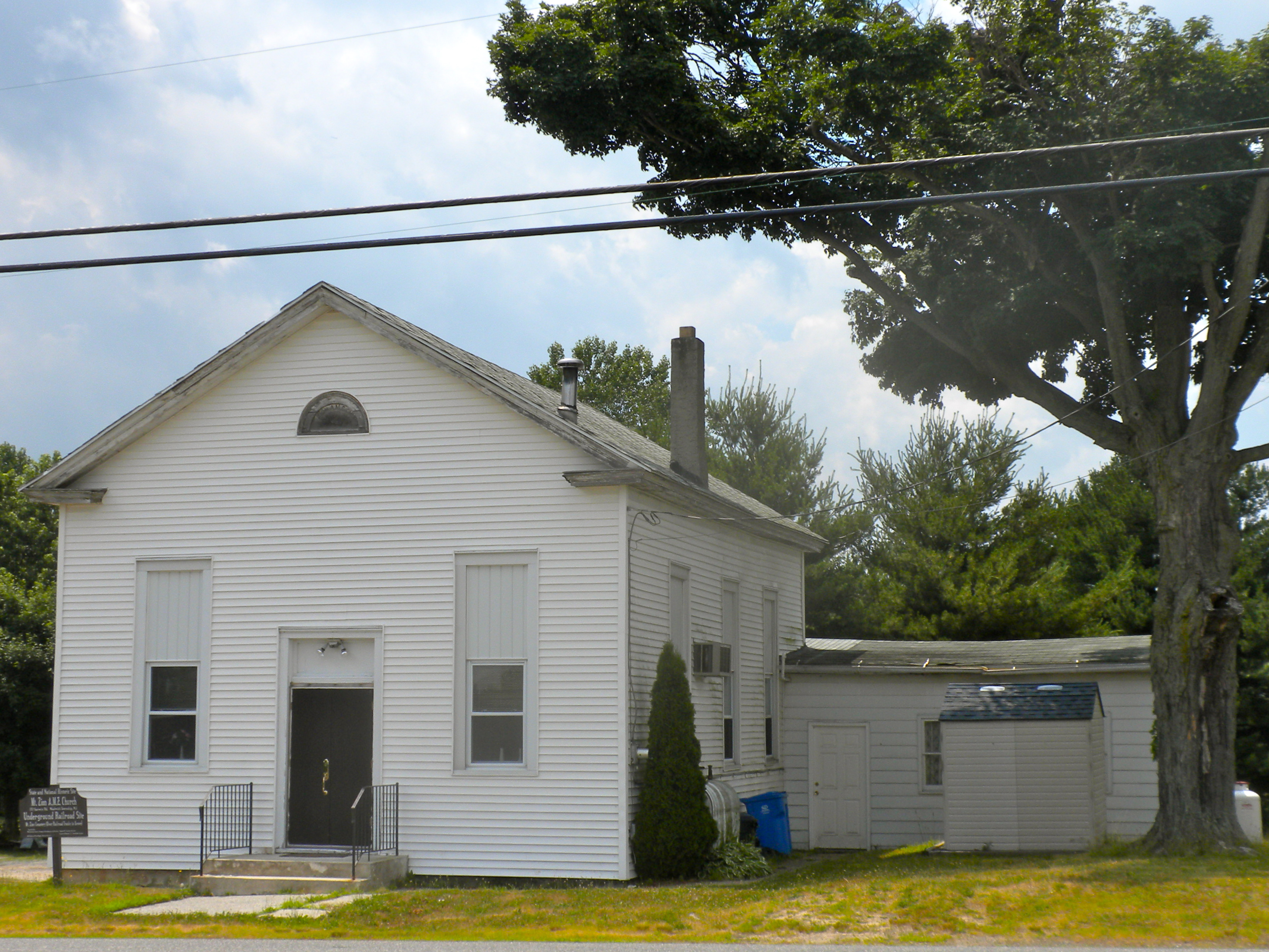

- Location within Gloucester County, New Jersey Location within New Jersey Location within the United States
- Location: 172 Garwin Road, Woolwich Township, New Jersey, U.S.
- Coordinates: 39°45′54″N 75°17′50″W
- Area: church 0.1 acres (0.040 ha) cemetery 0.25 acres (0.10 ha)
- Built: 1834
- Architectural style: Mid 19th Century Revival
- NRHP reference No.: 01000768
- Added to NRHP: July 25, 2001

Mount Zion African Methodist Episcopal Church and Mount Zion Cemetery is a historic church and cemetery located at 172 Garwin Road in Woolwich Township, New Jersey, United States. The church was a stop on the Greenwich Line of the Underground Railroad through South Jersey operated by Harriet Tubman for 10 years. The church provided supplies and shelter to runaway slaves on their way to Canada from the South. The church and cemetery were part of the early 19th-century free negro settlement sponsored by Quakers known as Small Gloucester.

The church was founded in 1799 as a Methodist Society and became part of the African Methodist Episcopal Church in 1813. The current structure was built in 1834, remodeled in 1887 and expanded in 1959. The cemetery is a quarter of an acre in size and located just west of the church. It contains more than 200 graves, some of which date back to 1861. The church and cemetery are on the New Jersey Register of Historic Places and were added to the National Register of Historic Places in 2001.

== Church ==
In the 17th century, Swedish, Dutch and English settlers brought slaves to South Jersey to perform the manual labor needed to establish their colonies. Many of the English settlers that founded the West Jersey colony were Quaker and began to debate the morality of owning human beings. In 1738, the Quakers of New Jersey and Pennsylvania united and submitted an agreement to the Society of Friends which recommended to discontinue the use of Africans as slaves. While the Quakers were early proponents of the religious education of slaves, few African-Americans took up Quakerism. However, many Methodists evangelized in South Jersey to slaves and converted many of them. Several African-American preachers, including Richard Allen, traveled throughout the West Jersey colony, including around Woolwich township, and had a great impact on establishing Methodism among the African-Americans living there.

After the American Revolutionary War, the Quakers and other anti-slavery proponents established small hamlets on their property for freed slaves and African Americans to live. The church and cemetery were part of the early 19th-century free negro settlement known as Small Gloucester supported by local Quakers including the Van Leer family. The church was founded in 1799 as a Methodist Society and became a member of the African Methodist Episcopal Church in 1813. The land for the church was purchased in 1833 and the one-story frame church was built in 1834. It was remodeled in 1887 and expanded in 1959. The changes made in 1959 include the addition of a social hall, kitchen, pastor's study and bathrooms. The additions gave the building an L-shape. The addition of vinyl siding and minor cosmetic changes were made in the 1990s.

The church was part of the Underground Railroad route through South Jersey known as the Greenwich Line. The line began in Springtown, New Jersey through Small Gloucester and north to Mount Holly, Burlington and Jersey City. Harriet Tubman helped operate the Greenwich Line for over 10 years. The church provided supplies and shelter for slaves using the Underground Railroad to flee to Canada. A secret three-by-four foot trap door in the vestibule of the church was used to access a crawlspace to hide runaway slaves.

The church and cemetery are on the New Jersey Register of Historic Places and they were added to the National Register of Historic Places in 2001. The congregation is still active and holds worship services on Sundays.

== Cemetery ==
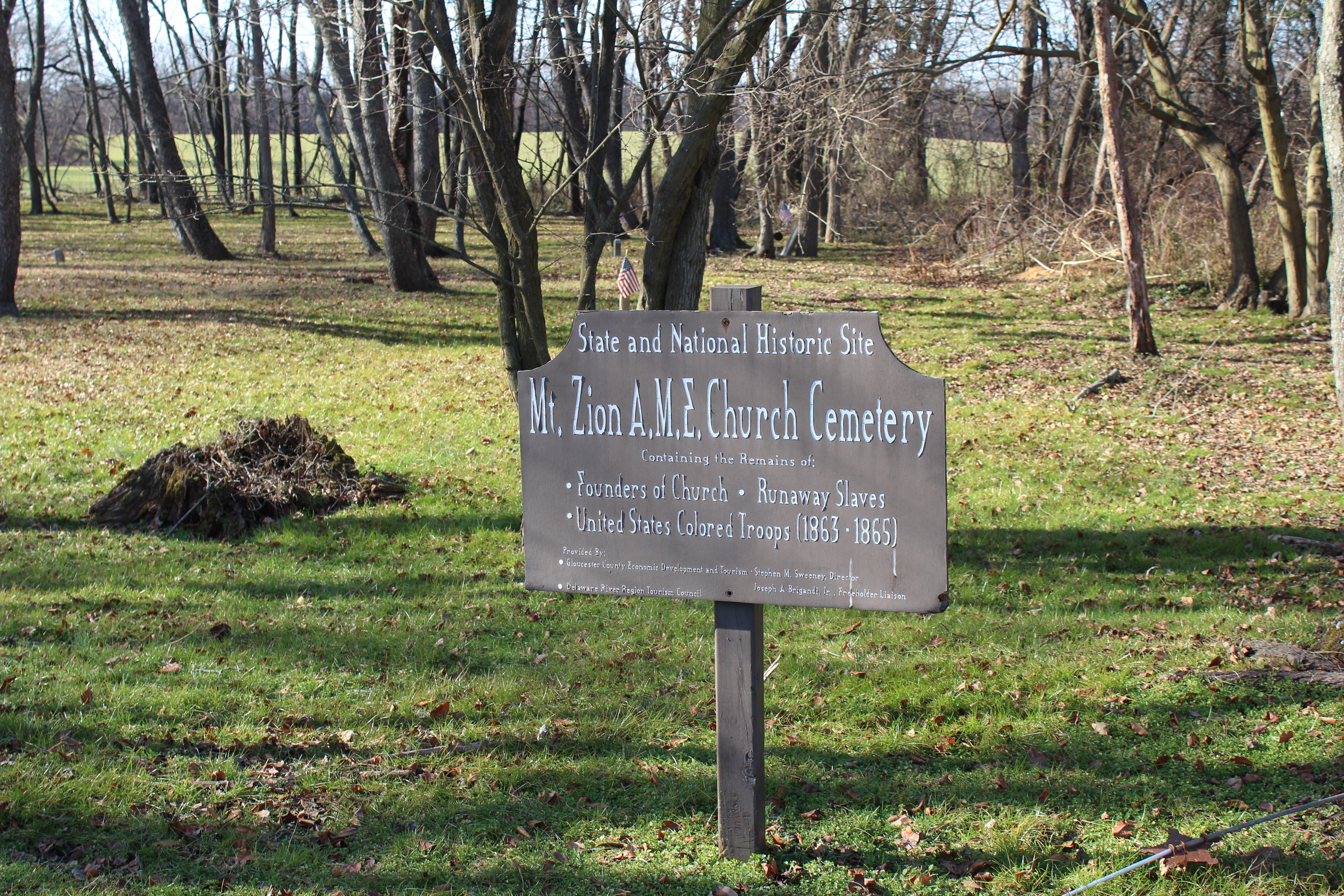
Mount Zion African Methodist Episcopal Church Cemetery sign

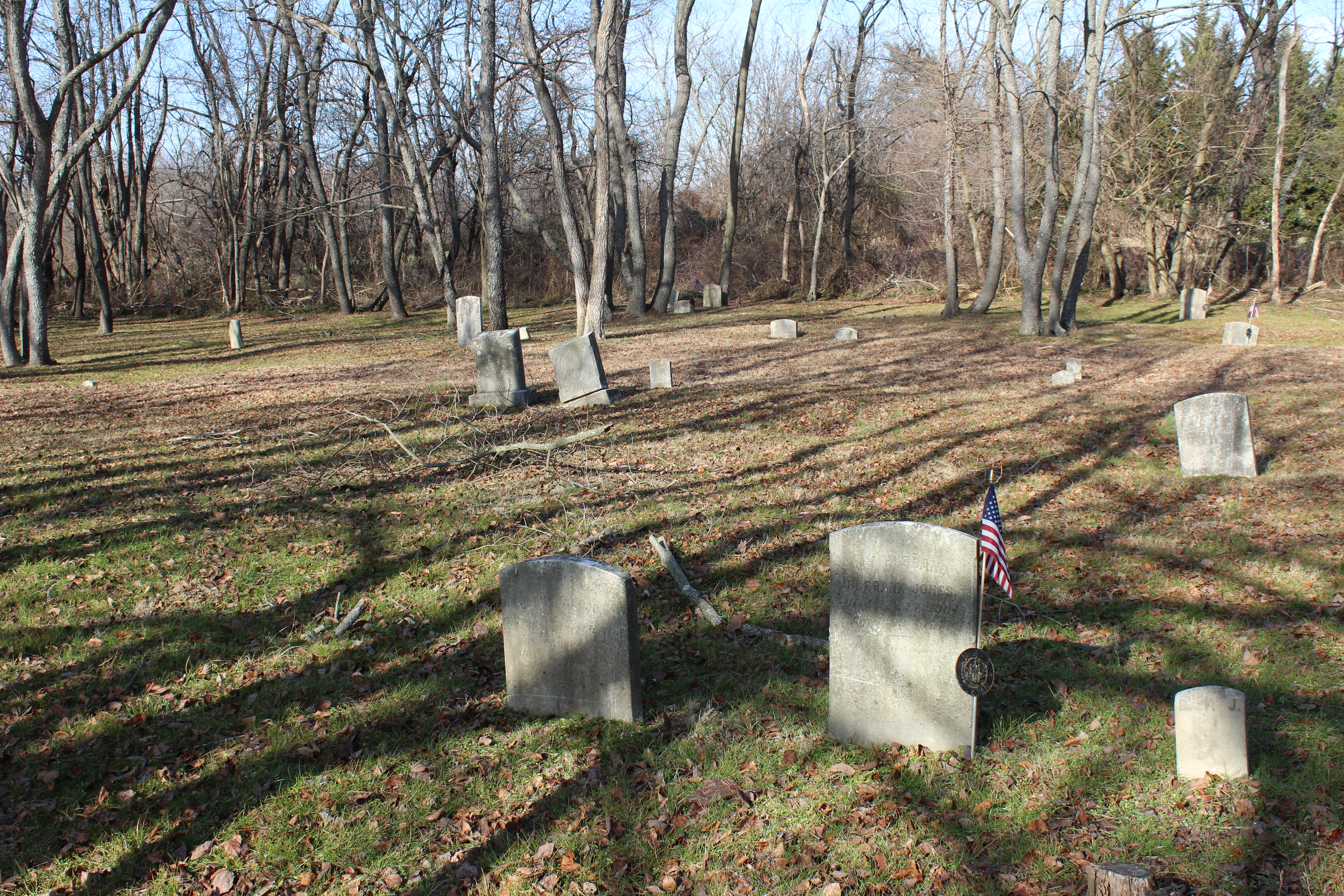
Gravestones in Mount Zion African Methodist Episcopal Church Cemetery

The cemetery is a quarter of an acre in size and is located just west of the church. The plot contains more than two hundred graves, most of which are unmarked. The oldest gravestone has a date of 1861, however it is believed that burials date back to the 1830s. Thirteen black soldiers from the American Civil War are buried in the cemetery. The cemetery was closed to new burials, fell into disrepair, many of the stones sank into the ground and the plot became overgrown with trees. Many of the overgrown trees have been cut back and the cemetery is currently maintained by the Gloucester County Probation Office.

== See also ==
- List of Underground Railroad sites
- National Register of Historic Places listings in Gloucester County, New Jersey
