= Madeline Cheek Hunter =

American educator

Madeline Cheek Hunter (1916–1994) was an American educator who developed a model for teaching and learning that was widely adopted by schools during the last quarter of the 20th century.

She was named one of the hundred most influential women of the 20th century and one of the ten most influential in education by the Sierra Research Institute and the National Women's Hall of Fame.

== Life ==
Hunter's family originally lived in Canada where she was born. Her father was an avid hunter who liked Canada because "the duck hunting was better there." As Hunter was a "sickly" child, the family ultimately moved to California to avoid the harsh winters in Saskatchewan. Although they returned to Canada from May to October for many years, most of her schooling was in California.

In junior high she was placed in an experimental school to test some of Stanford University's psychological theories on intelligence. They used her to score intelligence tests. As a result, she became interested in human intelligence; this along with classical ballet became her passions in life. As a 16-year-old she entered the University of California at Los Angeles as a combination pre-medicine and psychology major while continuing her ballet dancing. She had to choose either going to South America on tour with the Ballet Russe or finishing her degree in pre-medicine. She chose to finish her degree and then realized that she had limited hand eye coordination which would deny her the chance of becoming a neurological surgeon. Two additional events influenced her choice of a career in school psychology. The first occurred in seventh grade, while sitting in an auditorium waiting to be assigned a class. She felt hurt when she was labeled as dumb; these feelings were never forgotten. Because of this experience she felt the need to give positive reinforcement to students in schools--"Never put a kid down, always build the kid up." A second influence occurred during her first work experiences at Children's Hospital in Los Angeles and at Juvenile Hall.

During World War II she married an engineer, Robert Hunter, who worked at Lockheed Aviation until he retired. They had two children, a daughter and a son. In 1944 their first child, Cheryl, was born. She went on to become a film editor. In 1946 they had their second child, Robin, who became a school principal.

After her children were on their own, she went back to working full-time as an educator. She held many positions, including school psychologist, principal, director of research, and assistant superintendent. She was given the opportunity to implement her educational model in a laboratory school setting. In Hunter's lifetime, she wrote 12 books, over 300 articles, and produced 17 videotape collections.

According to the Graduate School of Education at U.C.L.A where she worked, Hunter died at the age of 78 in Los Angeles from a series of strokes.

== Educational Beliefs ==
She believed that the foremost job of teachers was decision making, and that each teacher makes thousands of decisions each day. All of the decisions a teacher makes can be put into one of three categories: (1) content category - what you are going to teach; (2) teaching behavior category - what you as the teacher will do to facilitate and escalate that learning; and (3) learning behavior category - how the students are going to learn and how they will let you know that they've learned it.

In response to a question asking her to assess the current educational situation in the 1990s, she said, "I believe the future of education is bright! We are beginning to unlock the mystery of the human brain and how it processes and learns. We, now, can enable teachers to use that knowledge to accelerate that learning process. No longer is teaching a 'laying on of hands.' It has become a profession that combines science with art to create a better and a more productive world for humankind." (Source?)

== Theories on Education ==
Madeline Hunter developed the Instructional Theory into Practice teaching model. It is a direct instruction program that was implemented in thousands of schools throughout the United States.

Hunter identified seven components for teaching:

1. knowledge of human growth and development
2. content
3. classroom management
4. materials
5. planning
6. human relations
7. instructional skills

Hunter also developed a direct instructional model and elements of effective instruction.

The instructional model has seven components:

1. objectives
2. standards
3. anticipatory set
4. teaching (input, modeling, checking for understanding)
5. guided practice/monitoring
6. closure
7. independent practice

The elements of effective instruction are very similar to those of the instructional model, featuring seven components of teaching and behavioral objectives:

1. objectives
2. set(hook)
3. standards/expectations
4. teaching (input, modeling/demo, direction giving, and checking for understanding)
5. guided practice
6. closure
7. independent practice

Hunter was the creator of Instructional Theory into Practice (ITIP). ITIP is a teaching model on inservice/staff development program widely used during the 1970s and 1980s.

Madeline Cheek Hunter. (n.d.). Biographies. Retrieved November 5, 2008, from Answers.com Web site: http://www.answers.com/topic/madeline-cheek-hunter

Saxon, Wolfgang. "Madeline C. Hunter, Teaching Innovator And an Author, 78." Obituaries. 3 Feb. 1994. The New York Times. 29 Oct. 2008,
