= List of Baptist churches on the National Register of Historic Places in Alabama =

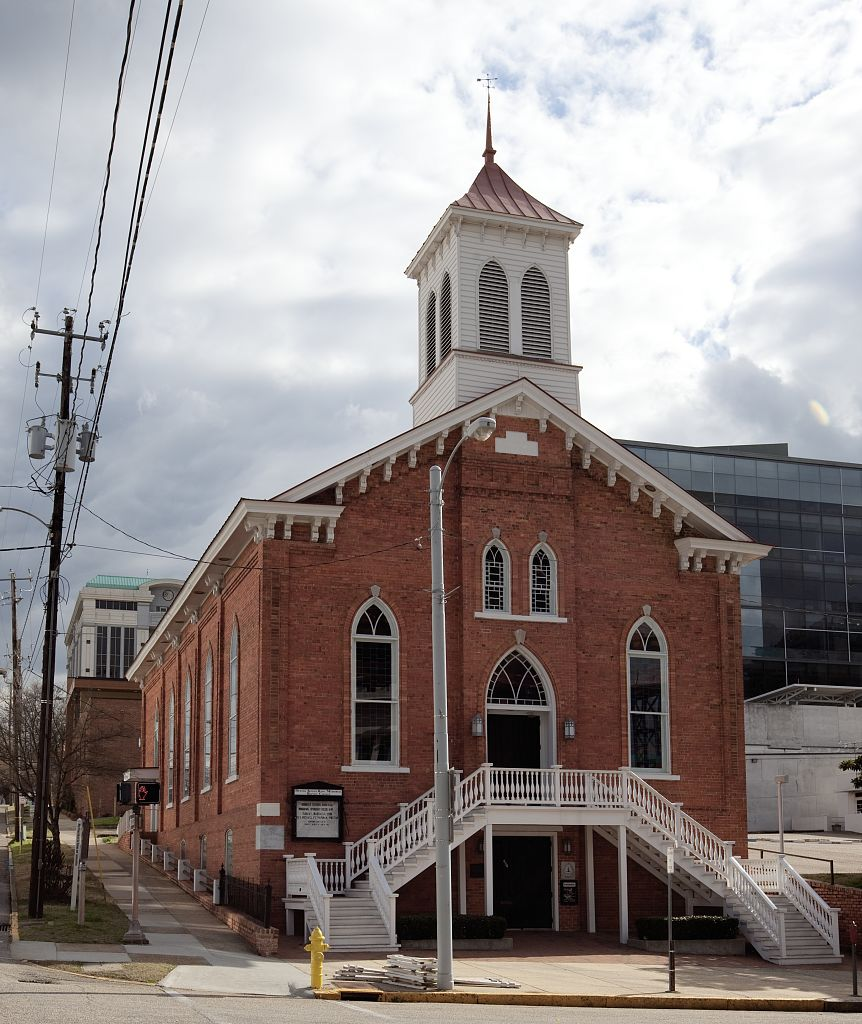
Dexter Avenue Baptist Church, pastored by Martin Luther King Jr. and used as a base of operations during the Civil Rights Movement.

This is a list of Baptist churches in the U.S. state of Alabama that are notable because they are National Historic Landmarks (NHL), listed on the National Register of Historic Places (NRHP), listed on the Alabama Register of Landmarks and Heritage (ARLH), or are otherwise significant for their history, association with significant events or people, or their architecture and design.

Baptist churches have been centers of worship and leadership in the state from the Mississippi Territorial period onward. Early Baptist churches were usually biracial in membership, although the African American members were almost always slaves belonging to the white congregants. The church buildings were often simple and unadorned. As the pioneer period faded and society developed, the churches tended to reflect the social order of southern society via gender, class, and racial divisions. Sometimes there were separate entrance doors for male and female members, with members remaining separated by gender inside. In wealthier communities, the more well-to-do members usually had reserved seats in the front. Slaves were always relegated to the rear or a mezzanine gallery in the building.

Baptist churches played pivotal roles in such issues as national divisions over the issue of slavery and the Civil Rights Movement. The Alabama Baptist Convention formed in 1823, only a few years after statehood, and helped lead the breakaway of southern Baptist churches from their northern counterparts many years prior to the outbreak of the American Civil War. The Alabama convention, along with Baptist conventions in other southern states, formed the Southern Baptist Convention after the breakup over the legality of slavery. Considered by Southern Baptists in Alabama as one of the most important churches during the early years of statehood is the Siloam Baptist Church in Marion. The congregation was established in 1822. The current brick Greek Revival building was completed in 1848. It is considered by Baptist leaders in the state as one of the most important mother churches of many of Alabama's Baptist institutions and churches because members of this church were instrumental in establishing both Judson College in 1838 and Howard College, now Samford University, in 1841. Judson College remains in Marion, while Howard College was moved to Birmingham in 1887 and was later renamed Samford University.

Although some African American Baptist churches formed in Alabama's cities prior to the Civil War, such as the St. Louis Street Missionary Baptist Church that formed in 1836 in Mobile, most African Americans in Alabama separated from white-dominated churches and set up their own congregations after the war and end of slavery. African-American Baptist congregations in Alabama played an important primary role in the civil rights movement in the United States. The St. Louis Street Missionary Baptist Church was host to the seventh Colored Baptist Convention of Alabama in 1874, a meeting that lead to the formation of Selma University in 1878. The Dexter Avenue Baptist Church is a National Historic Landmark near the Alabama State Capitol in Montgomery. Dr. Martin Luther King Jr. helped to organize the Montgomery bus boycott in the church's basement. The 16th Street Baptist Church is nationally known as the site of a Civil Rights-era bombing that killed four young girls. The church had served as an organizational headquarters, site of mass meetings and rallying point for blacks protesting widespread institutionalized racism in Birmingham. It is also recognized as a National Historic Landmark due to the fact that the tragedy marked a turning point in the Civil Rights Movement and contributed to the public outcry that added support for the passage of the Civil Rights Act of 1964.

In 1995, the Southern Baptist Convention voted to adopt a resolution that renounced its racist roots and apologized for its past defense of slavery. Alabama Baptist Convention churches and denominational leadership were supportive of this apology. In the first decade of the 21st century, two out of every three church members in Alabama and more than two-fifths of all residents consider themselves Baptists, with 1.1 million belonging to the churches in the Southern Baptist Convention and another 750,000, primarily African Americans, belonging to a variety of other Baptist associations. Following the 2011 Super Outbreak in Alabama, many Alabama Baptist churches of all races were active in providing relief to the victims.

Name	Image	Historic register	Locality	County	Notes
16th Street Baptist Church		NHL and NRHP-listed	Birmingham	Jefferson	Built in 1911. Significant for its participation in the Civil Rights Movement.
Ackerville Baptist Church of Christ		NRHP-listed	Ackerville	Wilcox	Built in 1848. Significant as an example of Greek Revival architecture in a rural religious building.
Aimwell Baptist Church		NRHP-listed	Mobile	Mobile	Congregation established in 1890, current building built in 1946. Significant as an early African American Baptist congregation.
Bethel Baptist Church		NRHP-listed	Birmingham	Jefferson	Significant for its participation in the Civil Rights Movement.
Canaan Baptist Church		NRHP-listed	Bessemer	Jefferson	Significant for its participation in the Civil Rights Movement.
County Line Baptist Church		NRHP-listed	Dudleyville vicinity	Chambers	Built in 1889.
Dexter Avenue Baptist Church		NHL and NRHP-listed	Montgomery	Montgomery	Built in 1883–89. Significant for its association with Dr. Martin Luther King Jr. and its participation in the Civil Rights Movement.
East End Baptist Church		NRHP-listed	Birmingham	Jefferson	Significant for its participation in the Civil Rights Movement.
Ebenezer Missionary Baptist Church		NRHP-listed	Auburn	Lee	Current building completed in 1908. It was the first African American congregation founded in the Auburn area, in 1865.
First African Baptist Church		NRHP-listed	Tuscaloosa	Tuscaloosa	Built in 1907. Significant for its participation in the Civil Rights Movement.
First Baptist Church, East Thomas		NRHP-listed	Birmingham	Jefferson	Significant for its participation in the Civil Rights Movement.
First Baptist Church, Kingston		NRHP-listed	Birmingham	Jefferson	Significant for its participation in the Civil Rights Movement.
First Baptist Church of Bay Minette		NRHP-listed	Bay Minette	Baldwin	Built in 1853.
First Baptist Church of Greenville		NRHP-listed	Greenville	Butler	Built in 1908.
First Baptist Church of Huntsville			Huntsville	Madison	Established in 1809, the oldest Southern Baptist church in Alabama. Current building completed in 1960.
First Baptist Church of Montgomery		ARLH-listed	Montgomery	Montgomery	Established in 1866 as one of the first African American churches in Montgomery. Current building completed in 1915.
First Baptist Church of Selma		NRHP-listed	Selma	Dallas	Built in 1894. Significant for its participation in the Civil Rights Movement.
First Baptist Church of Wetumpka		NRHP-listed	Wetumpka	Elmore	Congregation formed in 1821. Now part of a larger campus, the historic original church building is significant for its architecture, which combines Greek Revival and Gothic Revival motifs, and was built in 1852.
First Ebenezer Baptist Church		NRHP-listed	Birmingham	Jefferson	Significant for its participation in the Civil Rights Movement.
Holt Street Baptist Church			Montgomery	Montgomery	Built in 1913. Significant for its role in the Montgomery bus boycott.
Montgomery Hill Baptist Church		NRHP-listed	Tensaw	Baldwin	Built in 1914.
Mount Ararat Baptist Church		NRHP-listed	Birmingham	Jefferson	Significant for its participation in the Civil Rights Movement.
Mount Olive Missionary Baptist Church		NRHP-listed	Mobile	Mobile	Built in 1916. Significant as an early African American Baptist church.
Mount Zion Baptist Church		NRHP-listed	Mobile, AL	Mobile	Built in 1888. Significant for its participation in the Streetcar Boycott of 1902; the Civil Rights Movement
Mount Zion Baptist Church		NRHP-listed	Anniston	Calhoun	Built in 1890.
New Hope Baptist Church		NRHP-listed	Beatrice	Monroe	Built in 1870.
New Pilgrim Baptist Church		NRHP-listed	Birmingham	Jefferson	Significant for its participation in the Civil Rights Movement.
New Rising Star Baptist Church		NRHP-listed	Birmingham	Jefferson	Significant for its participation in the Civil Rights Movement.
Parker Memorial Baptist Church		NRHP-listed	Anniston	Calhoun	Built in 1888.
Peace Baptist Church		NRHP-listed	Birmingham	Jefferson	Significant for its participation in the Civil Rights Movement.
St. Louis Street Missionary Baptist Church		NRHP-listed	Mobile	Mobile	Founded by African Americans in 1836, the current building was completed in 1931. Significant for the age of its congregation, its architecture, and its leadership in African American education.
Sardis Baptist Church		NRHP-listed	Birmingham	Jefferson	Significant for its participation in the Civil Rights Movement.
Sardis Baptist Church		NRHP and ARLH-listed	Union Springs	Calhoun	Built in 1850.
Shady Grove Baptist Church		NRHP-listed	Birmingham	Jefferson	Significant for its participation in the Civil Rights Movement.
Shiloh Missionary Baptist Church		NRHP and ARLH-listed	Notasulga	Macon	Built in 1916. Site for some the infamous Tuskegee syphilis experiments.
Siloam Baptist Church		NRHP-listed	Marion	Perry	Congregation established in 1822. Current building completed in 1848. Considered by Southern Baptist leaders in the state as a mother church of many Alabama Baptist institutions and churches. The Founder of Siloam Baptist Church was Reverend Charles Crow who was also the founder of the Alabama Baptist Convention. Prior to establishing Siloam Baptist he founded Ocmulgee Baptist Church in June 1820.
Stone Street Baptist Church		NRHP-listed	Mobile	Mobile	Established in 1843 when the historically white Saint Anthony Street Baptist Church purchased property for the use of an African branch of the church. Current structure built in 1909. Significant for its architecture and as an early and influential African American Baptist church.
West End Hills Missionary Baptist Church		NRHP-listed	Birmingham	Jefferson	Significant for its participation in the Civil Rights Movement.

== See also ==
- History of Baptists in Alabama
- List of Baptist churches in the United States
