= St. Louis Street Missionary Baptist Church =

Historic church in Alabama, United States

- U.S. National Register of Historic Places
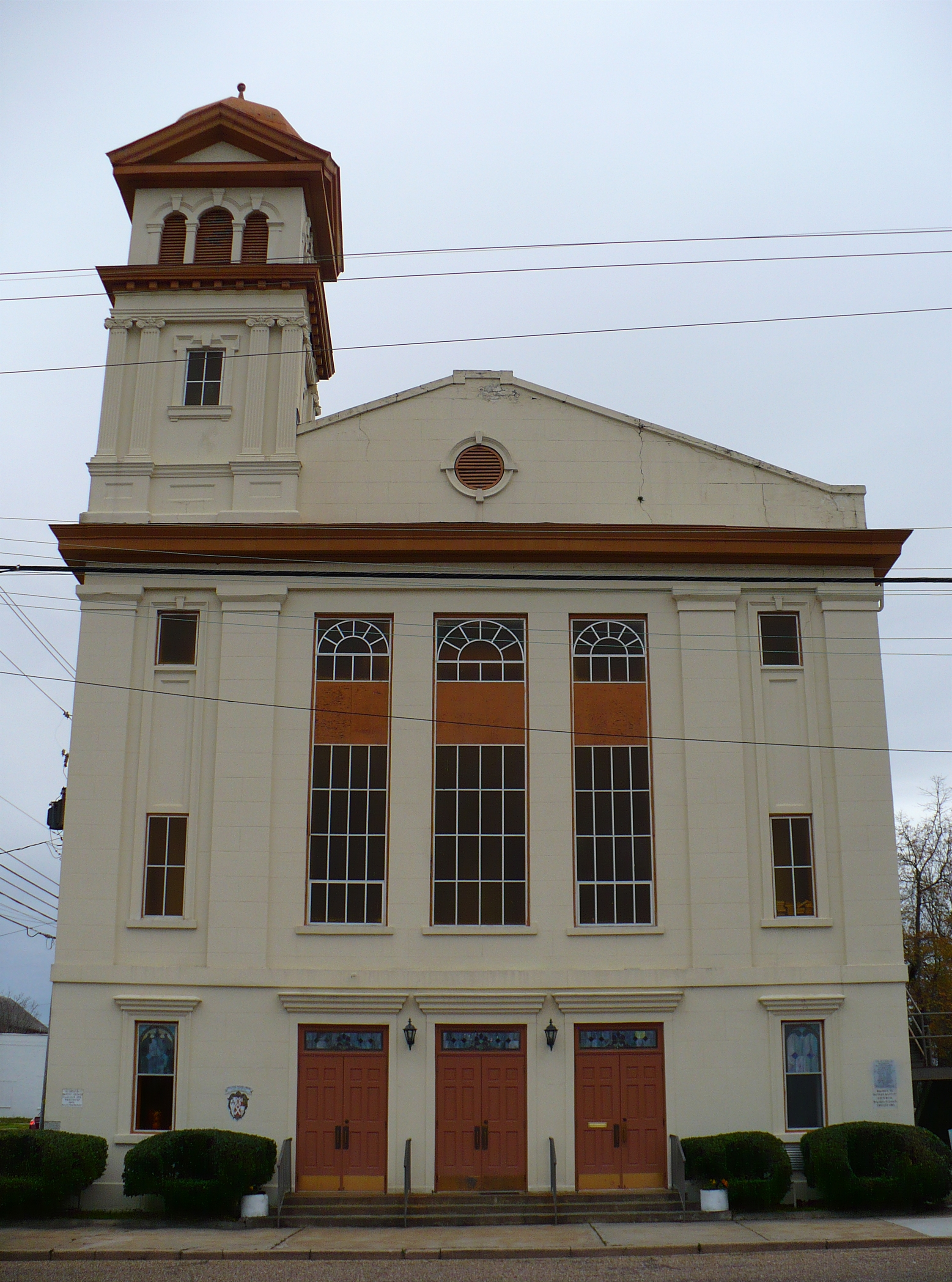
- St. Louis Street Missionary Baptist Church in 2009

- Location within Mobile, Alabama Location within Alabama Location within the United States
- Location: 108 N. Dearborn Street; Mobile, Alabama
- Coordinates: 30°41′29″N 88°3′4″W
- Built: 1872
- Architect: Hutchinsson, C.L.; et al.
- Architectural style: Classical Revival, Renaissance
- Restored: 1897
- NRHP reference No.: 76000347
- Added to NRHP: October 08, 1976

St. Louis Street Missionary Baptist Church is a historic African American church in Mobile, Alabama. It was added to the National Register of Historic Places on October 8, 1976, due to its architectural and historic significance.

== History ==
St. Louis Street Missionary Baptist Church began as a part of Mobile's African Baptist Church, located near the intersection of Springhill Avenue and Ann Street. The congregation was active by 1836, constructed its own building by 1839, and eventually became known as the Stone Street Baptist Church. A rift in this earlier church, over the sponsorship of a statewide missionary program, lead some members to establish what would become the St. Louis Street Missionary Baptist Church. The new congregation initially met near the intersection of Springhill Avenue and Broad Street, but by 1859 they had purchased the property on Dearborn Street.

The first pastor for the church was the Reverend Joshua Hawthorn, a white Baptist minister. Hawthorn left in 1860. He was followed by the Reverend Charles Leavens, the congregation's first African American minister. The congregation sent organizers all over the state, with the result of bringing in many new churches and pastors. The congregation built the current building in 1872, with the design by C. L. Hutchinsson, a local architect. The new building was host to the seventh Colored Baptist Convention of Alabama in 1874, a meeting that lead to the formation of Selma University in 1878. The present edifice religious was restored much time after in 1897.

== See also ==
- List of Baptist churches in Alabama
