= Alabama Baptist =

Alabama Baptist may refer to:

- Alabama Baptist Convention, a church organization
- The Alabama Baptist, a weekly newspaper
- History of Baptists in Alabama
