= Ackerville Baptist Church of Christ =

Historic church in Alabama, United States

- U.S. National Register of Historic Places
- Alabama Register of Landmarks and Heritage
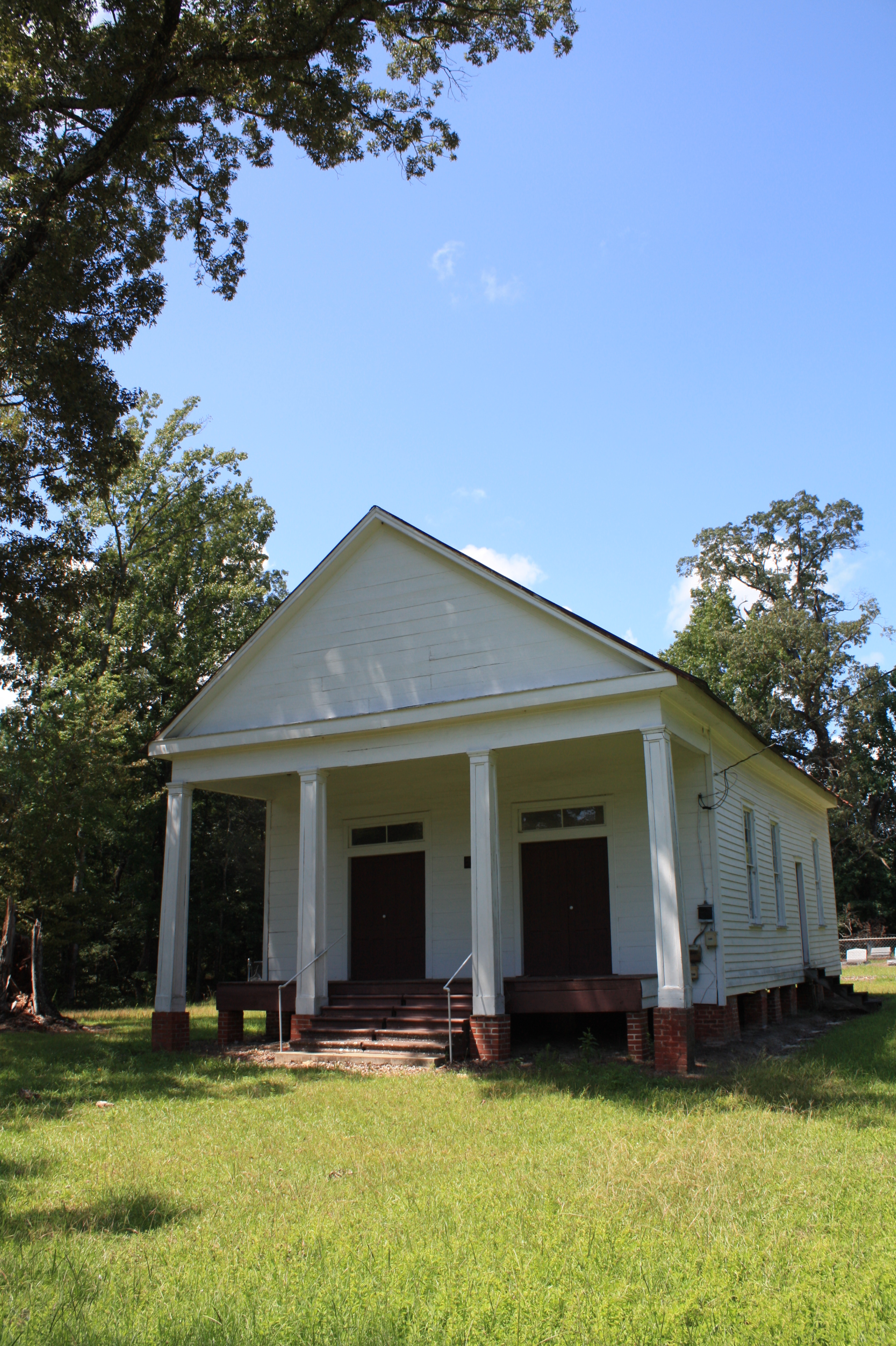
- Ackerville Baptist Church of Christ in 2009.

- Location within Alabama Location within the United States
- Location: Ackerville, Alabama
- Coordinates: 32°1′54″N 87°4′6″W
- Built: 1848
- Architectural style: Greek Revival
- NRHP reference No.: 03000228

Significant dates
- Added to NRHP: April 18, 2003
- Designated ARLH: July 22, 1991

The Ackerville Baptist Church of Christ is a historic Baptist Church of Christ building in Ackerville, Alabama. The one-story Greek Revival style church was built in 1848. It was added to the Alabama Register of Landmarks and Heritage on July 22, 1991, and to the National Register of Historic Places on April 18, 2003, due to its architectural significance.

== See also ==
- List of Baptist churches in Alabama
