= West End Hills Missionary Baptist Church =

Historic church in Alabama, United States

- U.S. National Register of Historic Places
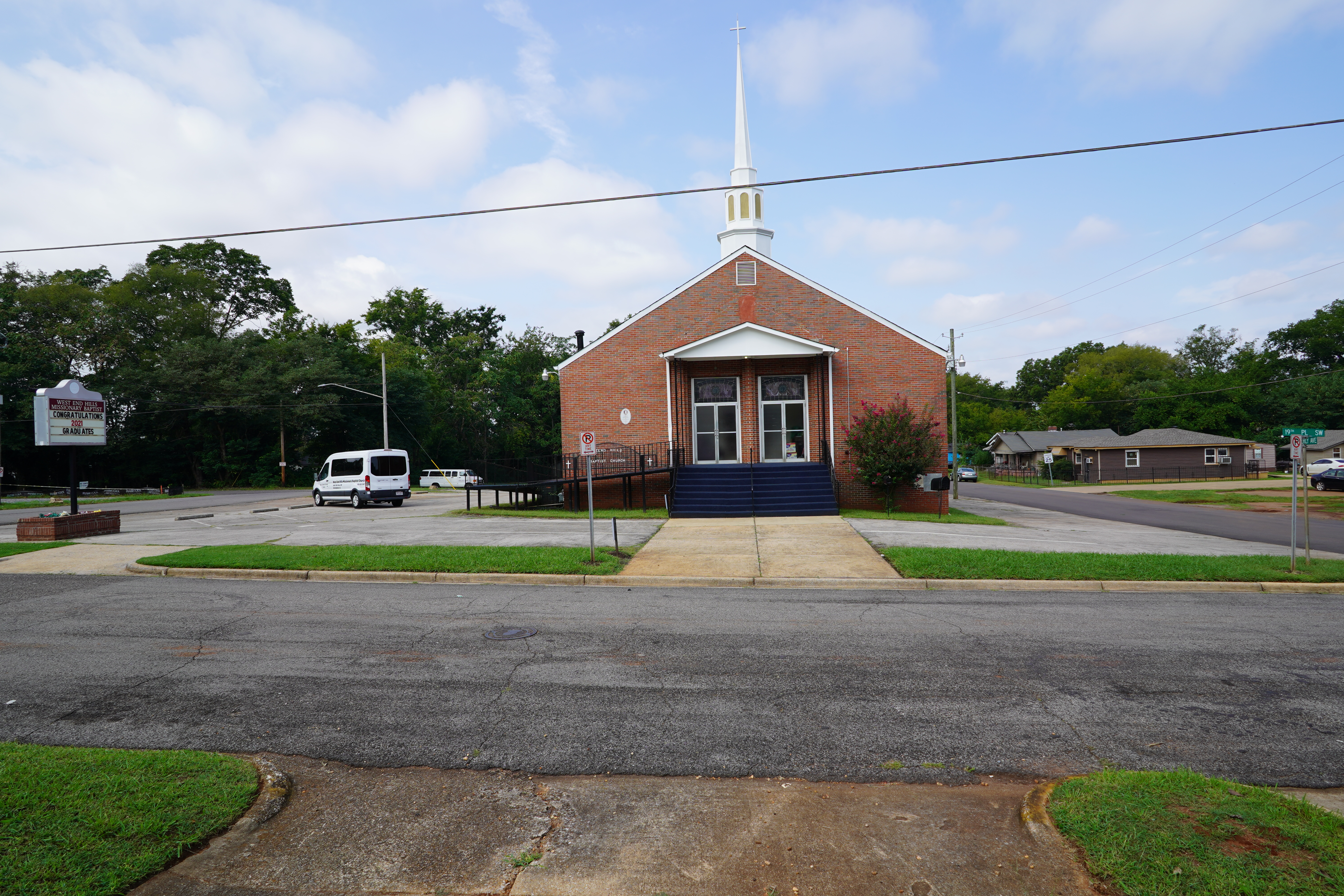

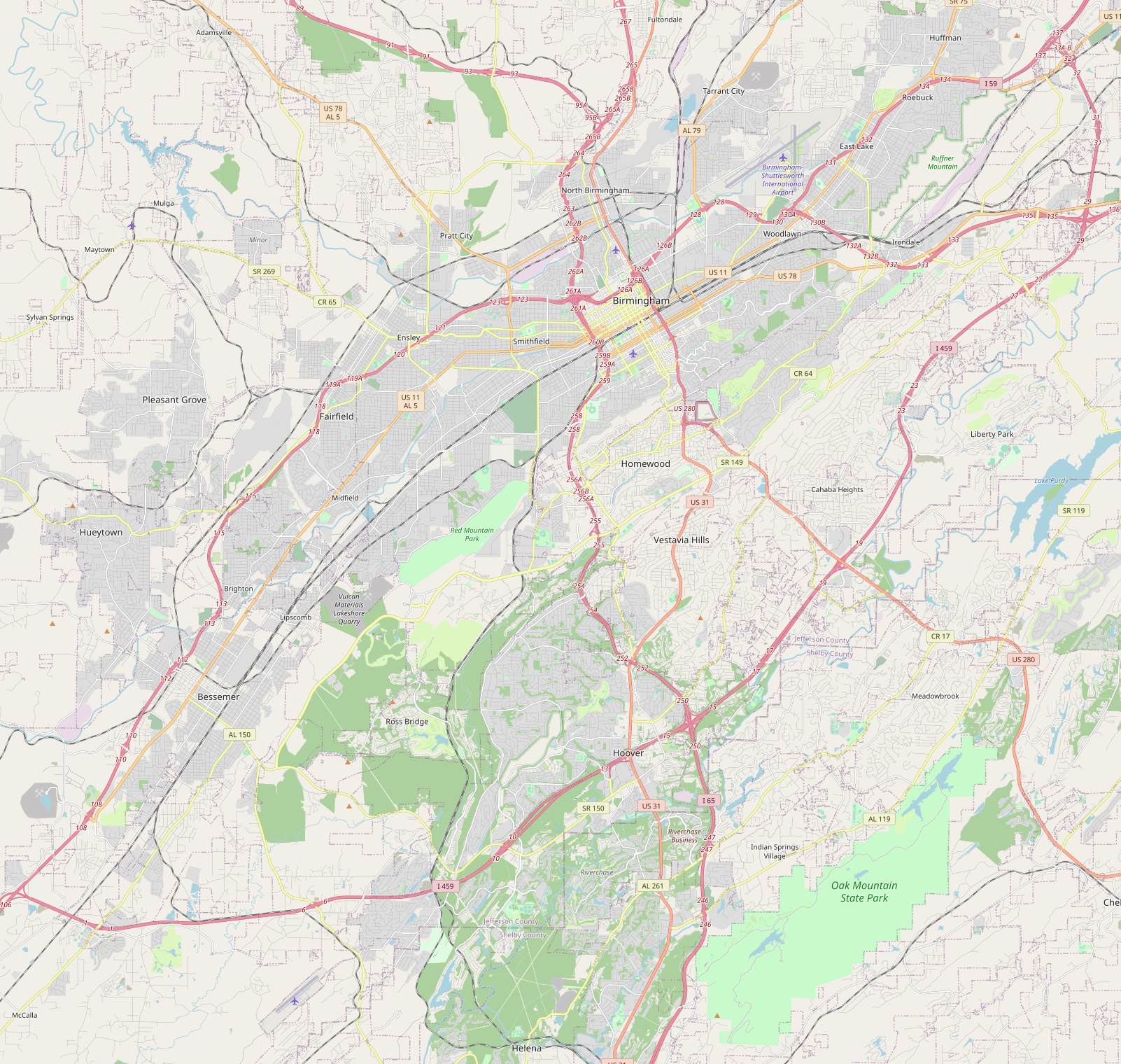
- Location within Birmingham, Alabama Location within Alabama Location within the United States
- Location: 1680 19th Place SW; Birmingham, Alabama
- Coordinates: 33°28′5″N 86°52′11″W
- Area: less than one acre
- Built: 1959–1965
- Architectural style: Colonial Revival
- MPS: Civil Rights Movement in Birmingham, Alabama MPS
- NRHP reference No.: 05000303
- Added to NRHP: April 20, 2005

West End Hills Missionary Baptist Church is a historic church at 1680 19th Place SW in Birmingham, Alabama. It was built between 1959 and 1965 when the main sanctuary was dedicated. The church is significant for its congregation's participation in the Alabama Christian Movement for Human Rights rallies for Civil rights in the 1950s and the 1960s under the direction of its pastor, the Rev. Coleman M. Smith. It was added to the National Register of Historic Places in 2005.
