= Mount Olive Missionary Baptist Church (Mobile, Alabama) =

Historic church in Alabama, United States

- Mt. Olive Missionary Baptist Church No.1
- U.S. National Register of Historic Places
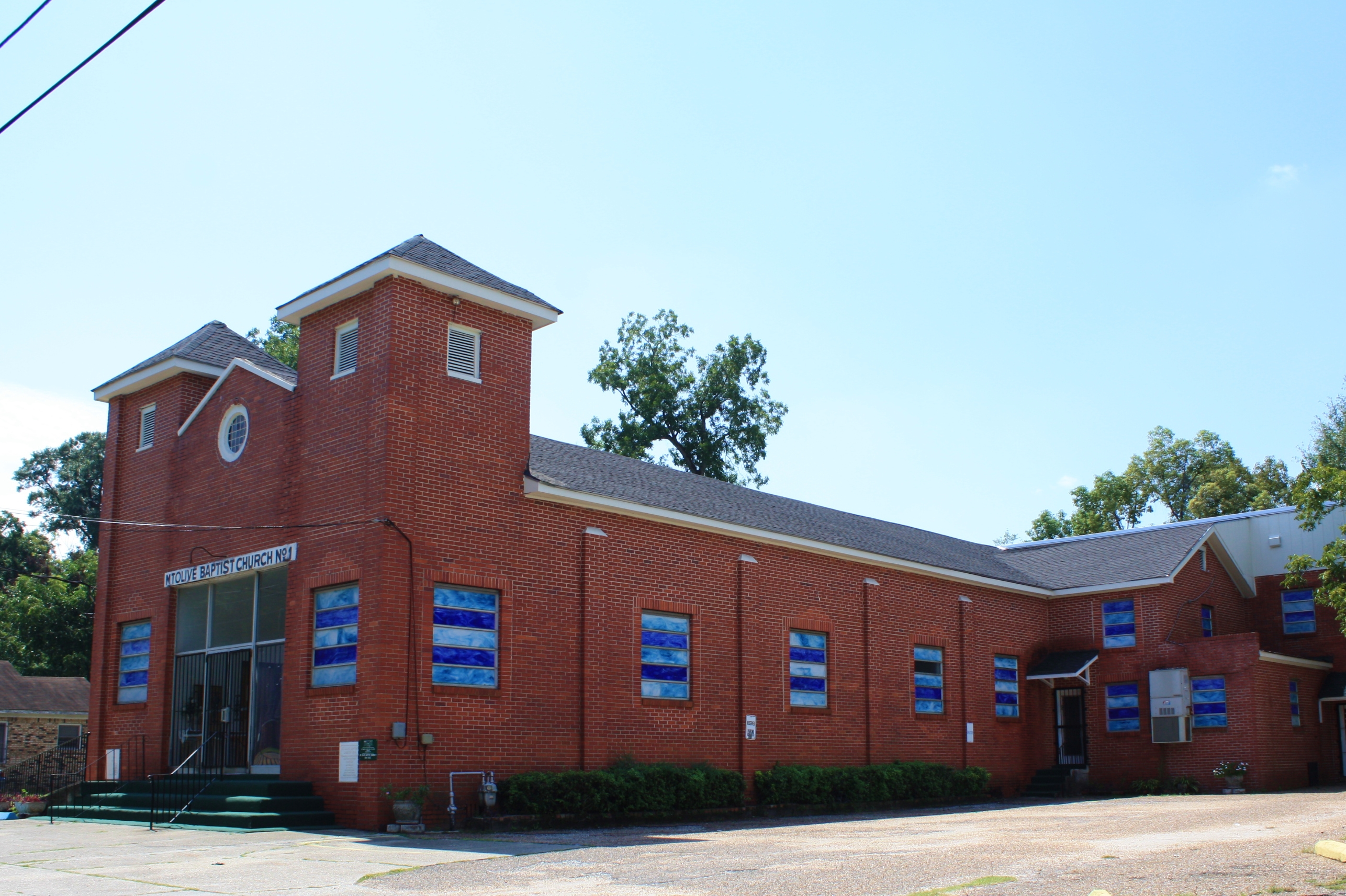

- Location within Mobile, Alabama Location within Alabama Location within the United States
- Location: 409 Lexington Avenue, Mobile, Alabama
- Coordinates: 30°42′0″N 88°4′8″W
- Built: 1916
- NRHP reference No.: 08000459
- Added to NRHP: May 29, 2008

Mt. Olive Missionary Baptist Church No.1 is a historic Missionary Baptist church building in Mobile, Alabama. The church was built in 1916 by the local African American community. It was added to the National Register of Historic Places on May 29, 2008, based on its architectural significance.
