= Mount Zion Baptist Church (Anniston, Alabama) =

Historic church in Alabama, United States

- U.S. National Register of Historic Places
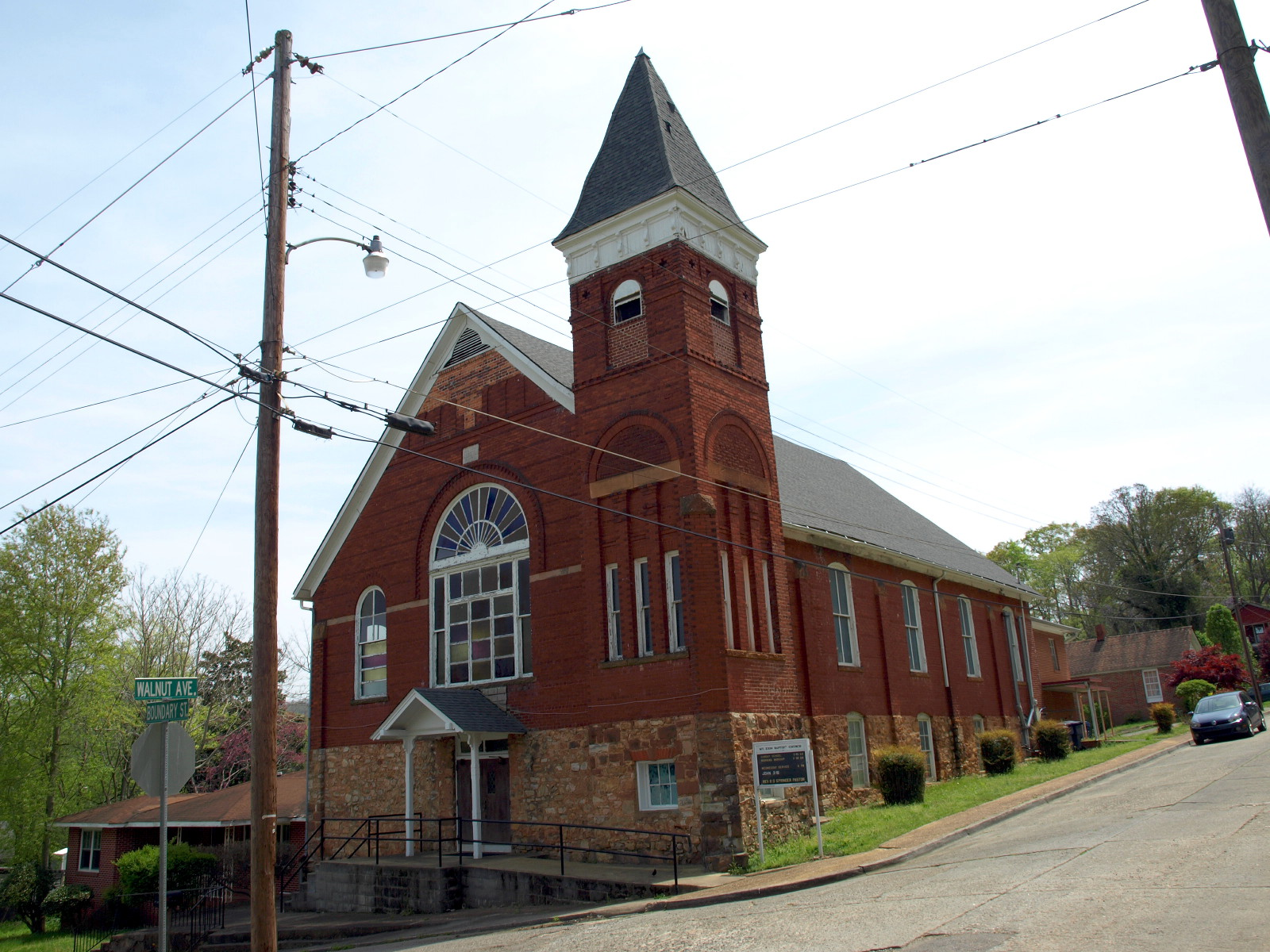
- The church in April 2014

- Location within Alabama Location within the United States
- Location: 212 Second St., Anniston, Alabama
- Coordinates: 33°38′47″N 85°49′58″W
- Area: less than one acre
- Built: 1890-1894
- Architectural style: Romanesque
- MPS: Anniston MRA
- NRHP reference No.: 85002875
- Added to NRHP: October 3, 1985

Mount Zion Baptist Church is a historic church at 212 Second Street in Anniston, Alabama, United States. It was built in 1890 and added to the National Register of Historic Places in 1985.
