= County Line Baptist Church =

Historic church in Alabama, United States

- U.S. National Register of Historic Places
- Alabama Register of Landmarks and Heritage
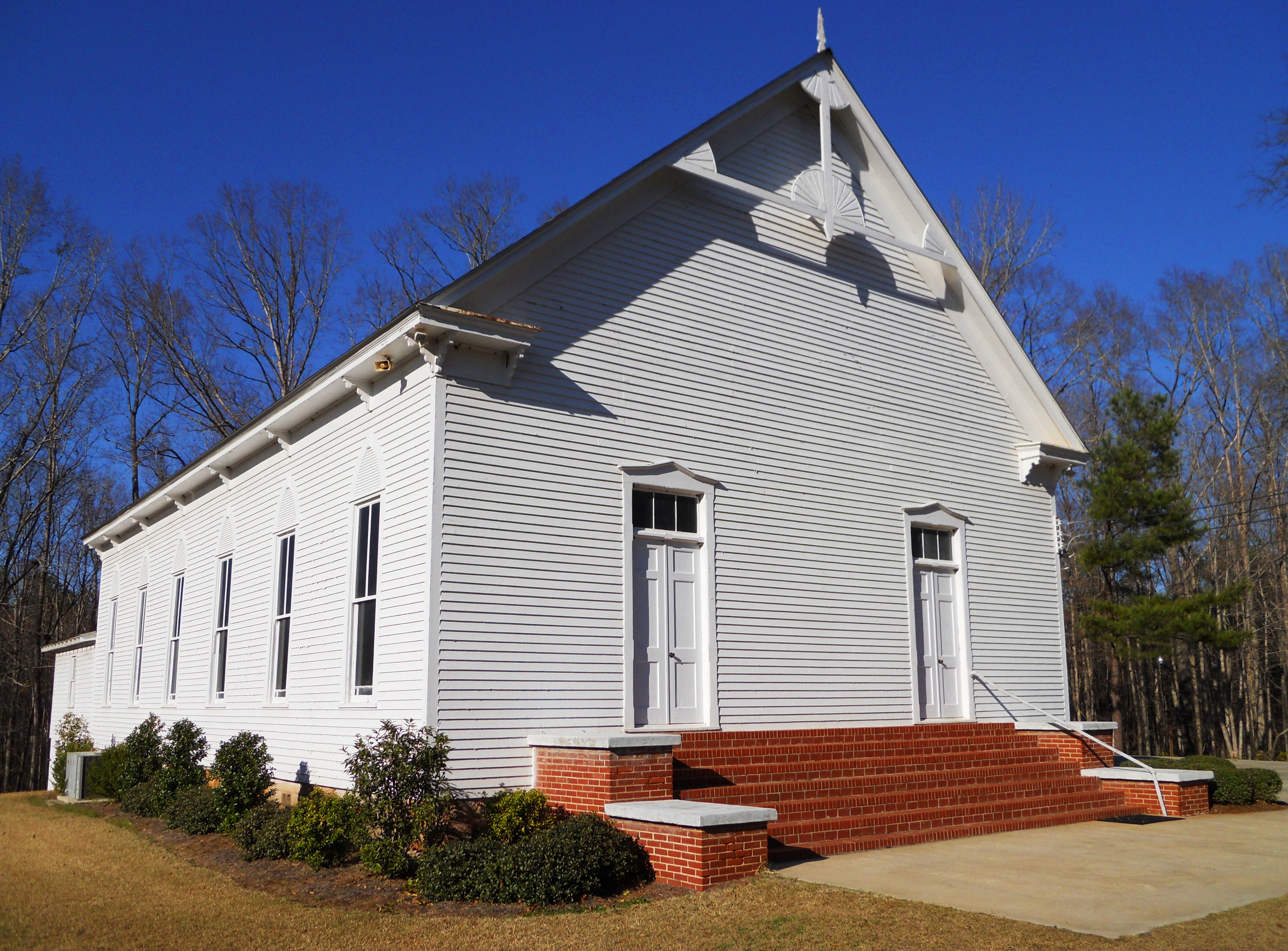
- County Line Baptist Church in 2011

- Location within Alabama Location within the United States
- Location: East of Dudleyville, Alabama
- Coordinates: 32°55′4″N 85°35′23″W
- Area: 5 acres (2.0 ha)
- Built: 1890
- NRHP reference No.: 82002001

Significant dates
- Added to NRHP: August 19, 1982
- Designated ARLH: January 14, 1980

County Line Baptist Church is a historic Southern Baptist church east of Dudleyville, Alabama, United States. The church was first organized on May 2, 1835, in the frontier home of William C. Morgan. Morgan purchased the 2-acre (0.81 ha) site from Creek Indians and contributed it to the church. The current church building on the site was built in 1890, and has been in continuous use, and remained virtually unaltered since its construction.

The church was added to the Alabama Register of Landmarks and Heritage on January 14, 1980, and the National Register of Historic Places on August 19, 1982.

== See also ==
- National Register of Historic Places listings in Alabama
