= History of Baptists in Alabama =

The history of the Baptist movement in the state of Alabama predates Alabama statehood.

== First Baptist churches ==
The first Baptist church in what was then the territory of Alabama was the Flint River Baptist church founded by twelve people on October 2, 1808, at the house of James Deaton a few miles to the north of Huntsville (now known as the Flint River Primitive Baptist Church). The pastor was John Nicholson. Prior to that there had been several Baptist preachers in the territory, including John Canterbery and Zadock Baker. Several more churches were founded over the next few years. The second Baptist church was founded on June 3, 1809, originally named West Fork of Flint River Church, although renamed to Enon Baptist Church shortly thereafter. (In 1861 the Enon church moved to Huntsville, and was renamed the First Baptist Church of Huntsville in 1895.) John Canterbery was the church's first pastor, called on August 5, 1809.

== Associations and conventions ==
The Flint River Association, the first and oldest association of Alabama Baptists, was founded on September 26, 1814. Flint River Baptist Church and Enon Baptist Church were charter members. Initially, several of the FRA's members were churches from Tennessee. The Flint River Association is still in existence today, consisting of three Huntsville area Primitive Baptist Churches, Briar Fork Church, Hurricane Church, and Flint River Church. The first church in the southern part of the state was Bassett Creek church, founded by J. Courtney in 1810. By 1820 there were 50 Baptist churches in the state; in 1821, there were 70. Numbers continued to grow in subsequent years, with 6 Baptist Associations and 128 churches in 1825; 250 churches in 1833; 333 churches in 1836; and 500 churches and 30 associations in 1840.

The geography of the state in the 19th century, with highly different political and economic groups physically isolated from one another by poor transport and communication links, resulted in several Baptist conventions emerging. The most well known, and largest, was the Alabama Baptist Convention founded in 1823 near Greensboro. Members of Siloam Baptist Church in Marion and the Alabama Baptist Convention founded Judson College in 1838 and Howard College, later renamed Samford University, in 1841. But there were others. The General Association of Middle Tennessee and North Alabama was founded in 1841, the East Alabama Baptist Convention in 1856, and the General Association of South Eastern Alabama after the U.S. Civil War.

Not allowed to be part of the Alabama Baptist Convention during that time, African American Baptists had their own conventions, separate from the white organizations. The Alabama Colored Baptist State Convention, which changed its name in 1974 to the Alabama Missionary Baptist State Convention, was founded in 1868 in Montgomery and by the turn of the 21st century comprised over 1000 churches. In 1898, the New Era Progressive Baptist State Convention split from the ACBSC, and another split in 1920 spawned the New Era Baptist State Convention. The Progressive National Baptist Convention, the fourth of the four major conventions in the late 20th and early 21st centuries, was formed in 1961 after disputes over leadership at the National Convention and over civil rights.

== Historical record ==
Much of this history is recorded in the library of Samford University. Baptists are the largest denomination in Alabama, and the University records include full minutes of congregational meetings throughout the state, the personal papers of many Baptist churchmen, and all issues of the Baptist newspaper, The Alabama Baptist from 1835 onwards.

== See also ==
- List of Baptist churches in Alabama
- Baptists in the United States
