= First Baptist Church, Kingston =

Historic church in Alabama, United States

- U.S. National Register of Historic Places
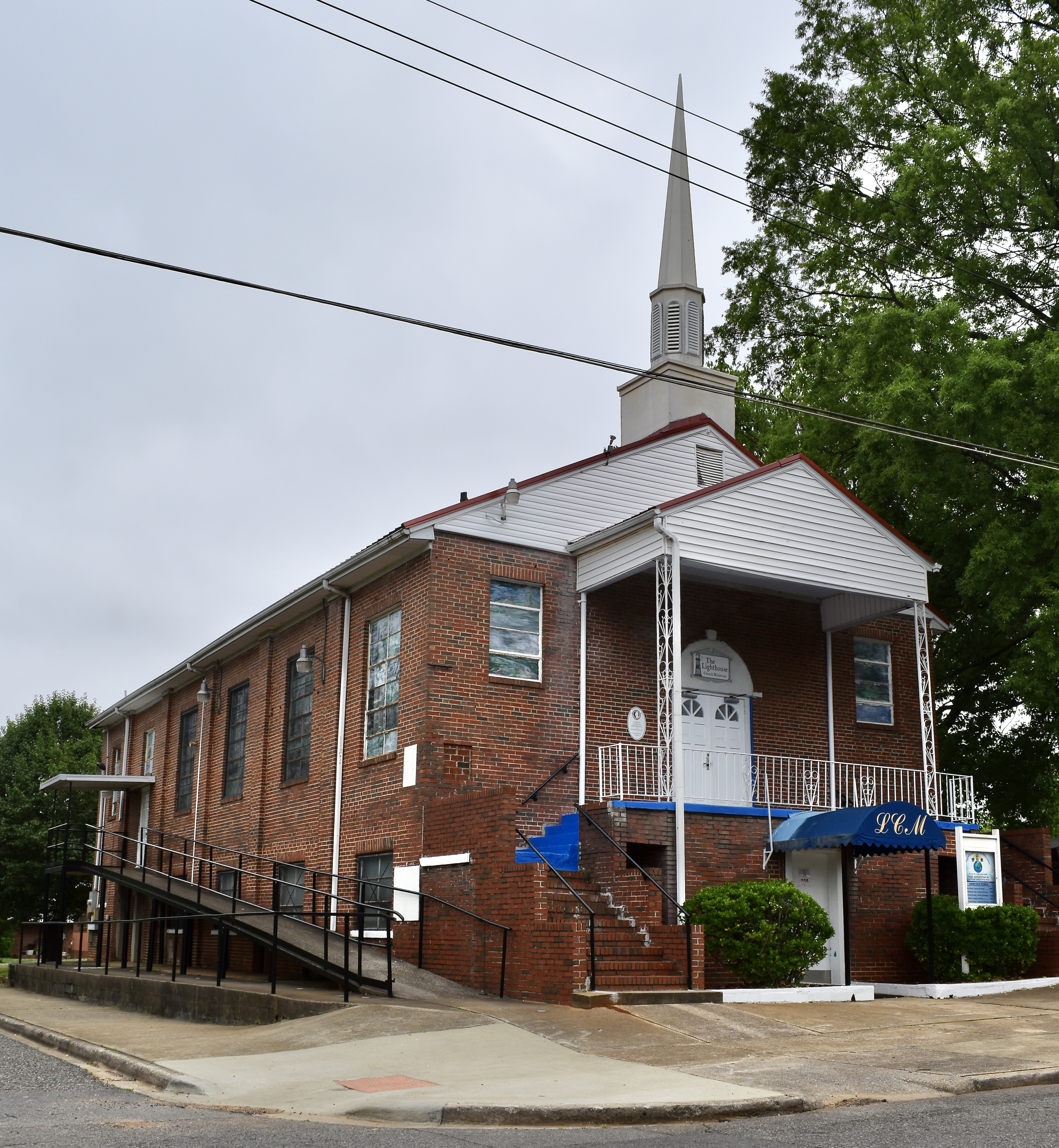

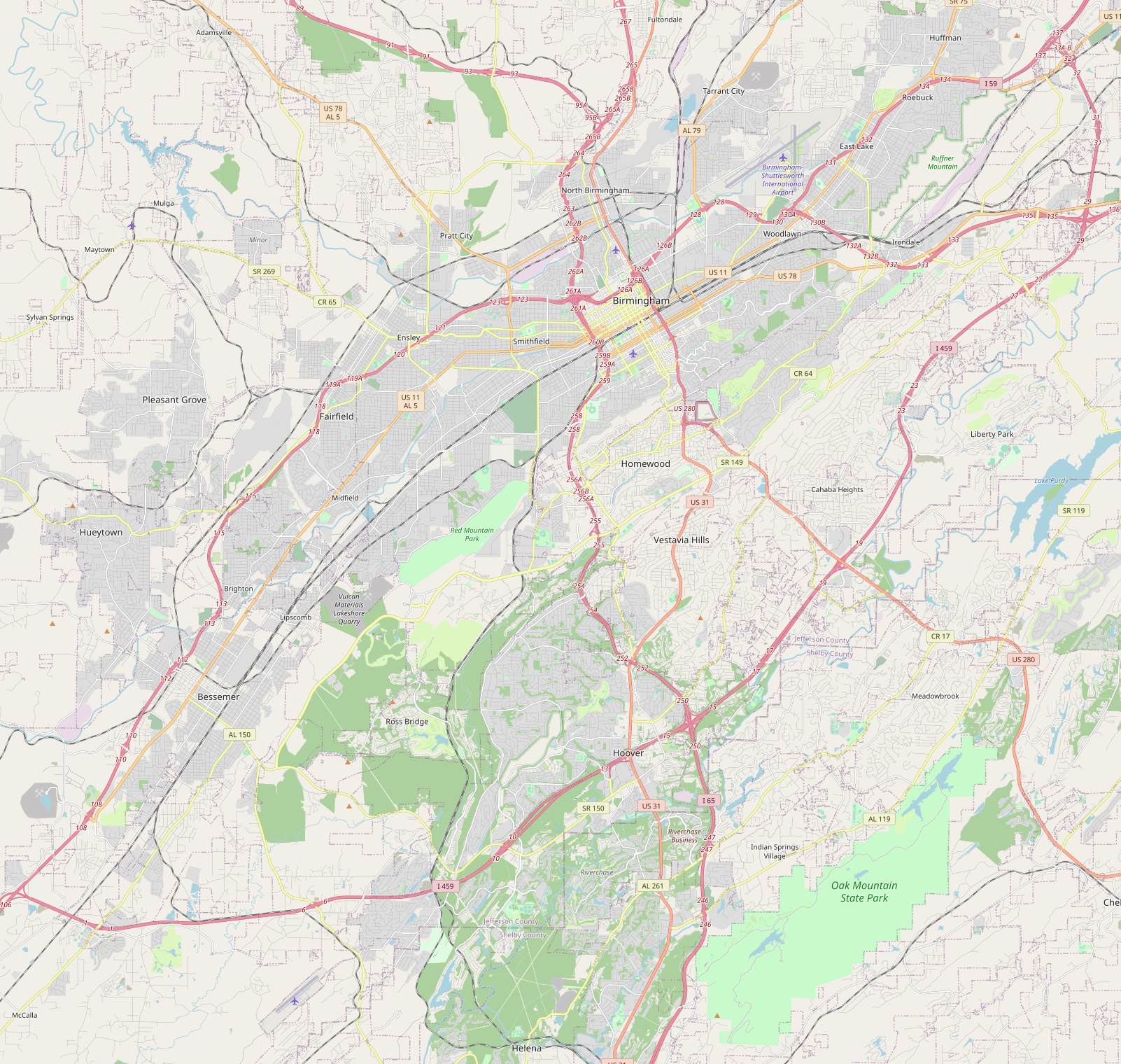
- Location within Birmingham, Alabama Location within Alabama Location within the United States
- Location: 4600 Ninth Ave. N Birmingham, Alabama
- Coordinates: 33°32′24″N 86°46′6″W
- Area: less than one acre
- Built: 1961
- Architectural style: Colonial Revival
- MPS: Civil Rights Movement in Birmingham, Alabama MPS
- NRHP reference No.: 05000300
- Added to NRHP: April 20, 2005

First Baptist Church, Kingston is a historic church at 4600 Ninth Avenue North in Birmingham, Alabama. It was built in 1961 and added to the National Register of Historic Places in 2005. The congregation was organized in 1930, it was led by George W. Dickerson from 1941 to 1972, it played a leading role in the Civil Rights Movement and served as a site for mass meetings held by the Alabama Christian Movement for Human Rights. The church is now surrounded by a public housing project erected in the late 1950s.

In 2000, the congregation relocated to a new building at 4240 Ninth Avenue North and sold this structure the next year to Lighthouse Church Ministries.
