= Ackerville, Alabama =

Unincorporated community in Alabama, United States

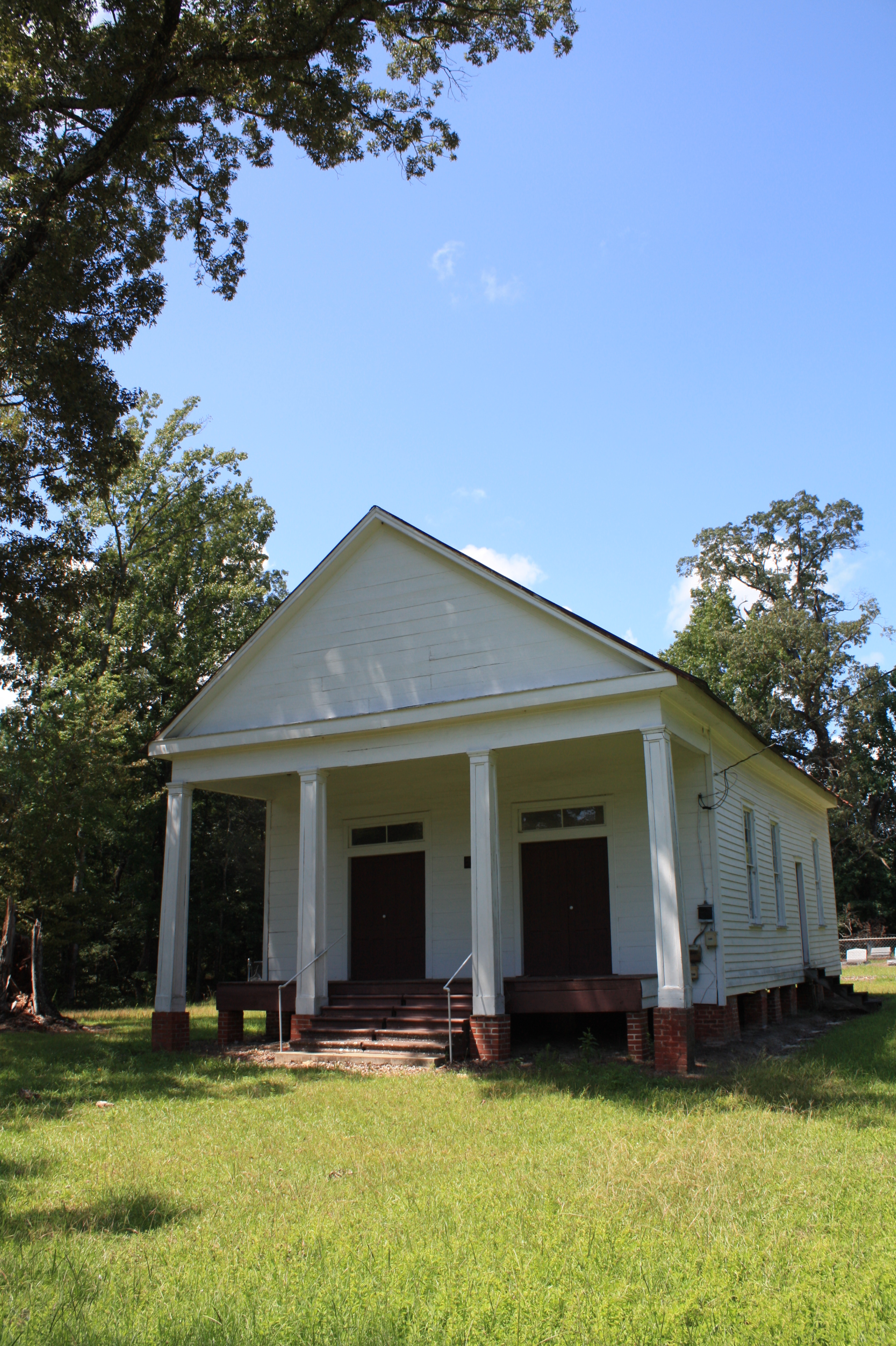
- Ackerville Baptist Church of Christ

- Location within the state of Alabama Ackerville, Alabama (the United States)
- Coordinates: 32°1′48″N 87°3′57.6″W
- Country: United States
- State: Alabama
- County: Wilcox
- Elevation: 285 ft (87 m)
- Time zone: UTC-6 (Central (CST))
  - Summer (DST): UTC-5 (CDT)
- Area code: 334

Ackerville is an unincorporated community in Wilcox County, Alabama, United States. Ackerville has one site included on the National Register of Historic Places, the Ackerville Baptist Church of Christ.

== History ==
A post office was established at Ackerville in 1892 and remained in operation until it was discontinued in 1940. The community was named in honor of the Acker family of area residents.

== Geography ==
Ackerville is located at 32.030°N 87.066°W and has an elevation of 285 feet (87 m).

== Demographics ==
=== Ackerville Precinct (1900-50) ===
Historical population
Census	Pop.	Note	%±
1900	1,376		—
1910	1,240		−9.9%
1920	1,291		4.1%
1930	500		−61.3%
1940	459		−8.2%
1950	398		−13.3%
U.S. Decennial Census

Ackerville village has never reported a population figure separately on the U.S. Census as an unincorporated community. However, the 19th precinct within Wilcox County bore its name from 1900 to 1950. In the 1930 and 1940 returns, when the census recorded racial statistics for the precincts, both times reported a Black majority for the precinct. In 1960, the precincts were merged and/or reorganized into census divisions (as part of a general reorganization of counties) and it was consolidated into the census division of Pine Apple.
