= Shady Grove Baptist Church =

Historic church in Alabama, United States

- U.S. National Register of Historic Places
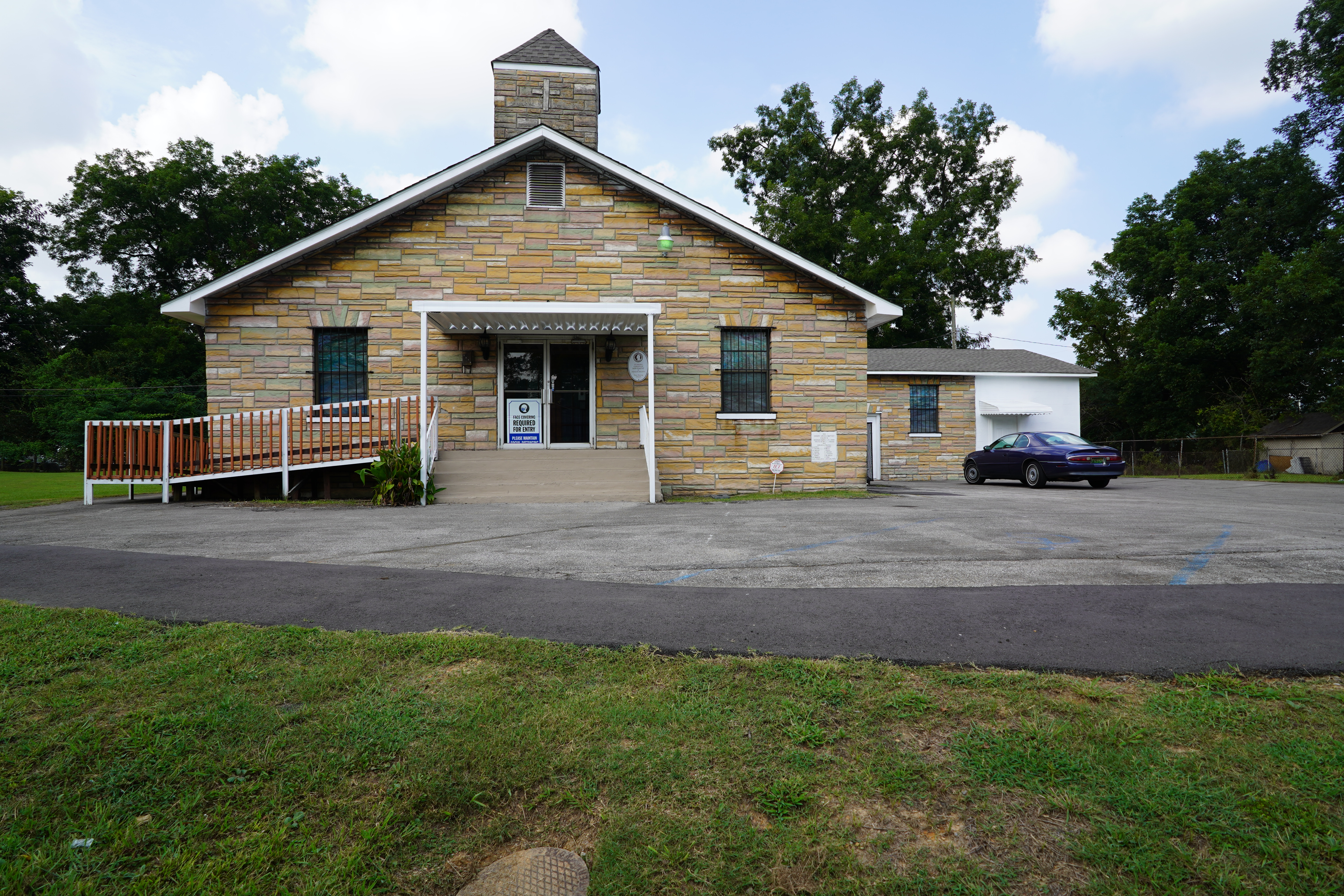

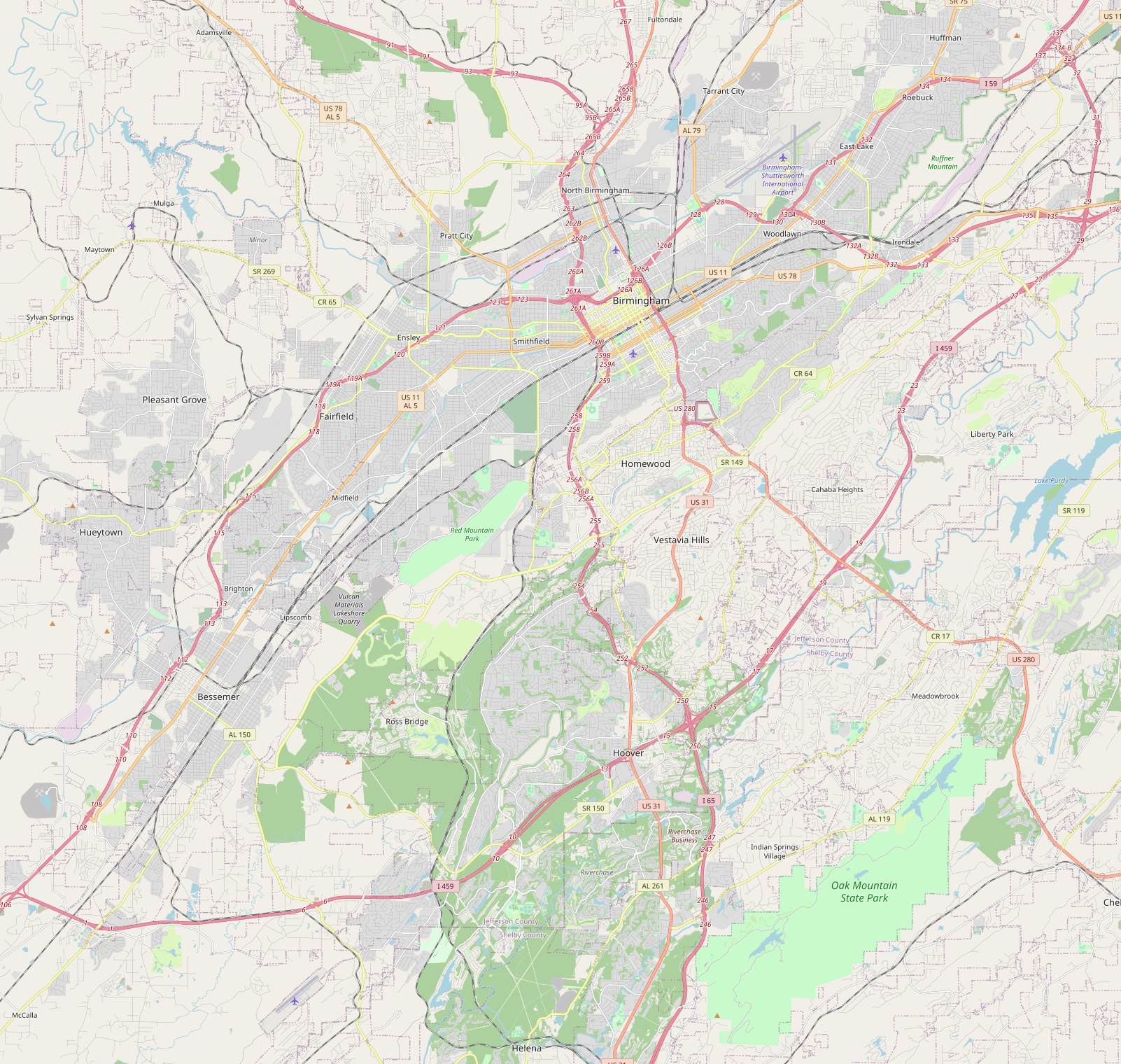
- Location within Birmingham, Alabama Location within Alabama Location within the United States
- Location: 3444 31st Way North, Collegeville, Birmingham, Alabama
- Coordinates: 33°33′35″N 86°48′15″W
- Area: less than one acre
- Built: 1943; 83 years ago
- Built by: Rev. L.J. Rogers
- MPS: Civil Rights Movement in Birmingham, Alabama MPS
- NRHP reference No.: 05000297
- Added to NRHP: April 20, 2005

Shady Grove Baptist Church, also known as Shady Grove Missionary Baptist Church, is a historic church at 3444 31st Way North, Collegeville, in Birmingham, Alabama. The building is of concrete construction and was built in 1942 under the direction of its pastor, the Rev. Lewis J. Rogers. The congregation was established in 1902. The cornerstone is dated 1943. The exterior was faced with Permastone in the early 1960s. It is significant for its congregation's participation in the Alabama Christian Movement for Human Rights rallies for Civil rights in the 1950s and the 1960s under Rogers's direction. The building was added to the National Register of Historic Places in 2005.

In 2021, the congregation garnered national attention after the pastor's daughter was shot and killed in a local park on Easter Sunday.
