= New Pilgrim Baptist Church =

Historic church in Alabama, United States

- U.S. National Register of Historic Places
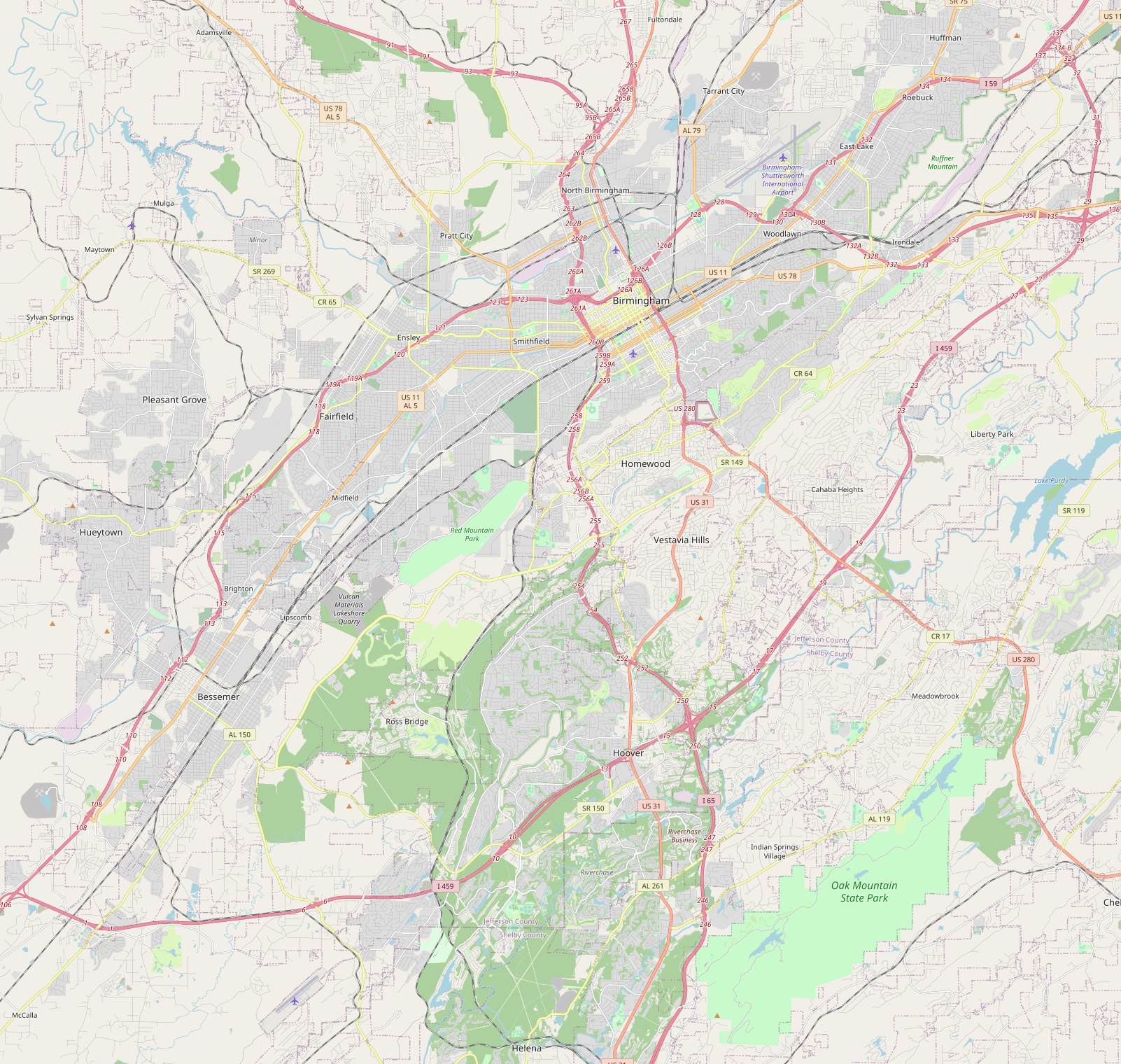
- Location within Birmingham, Alabama Location within Alabama Location within the United States
- Location: 903 Sixth Ave S, Birmingham, Alabama
- Coordinates: 33°30′4″N 86°48′55″W
- Area: less than one acre
- Built by: Van Keuren-Davis & Co.
- Architectural style: Gothic Revival
- MPS: Civil Rights Movement in Birmingham, Alabama MPS
- NRHP reference No.: 05000306
- Added to NRHP: August 24, 2007

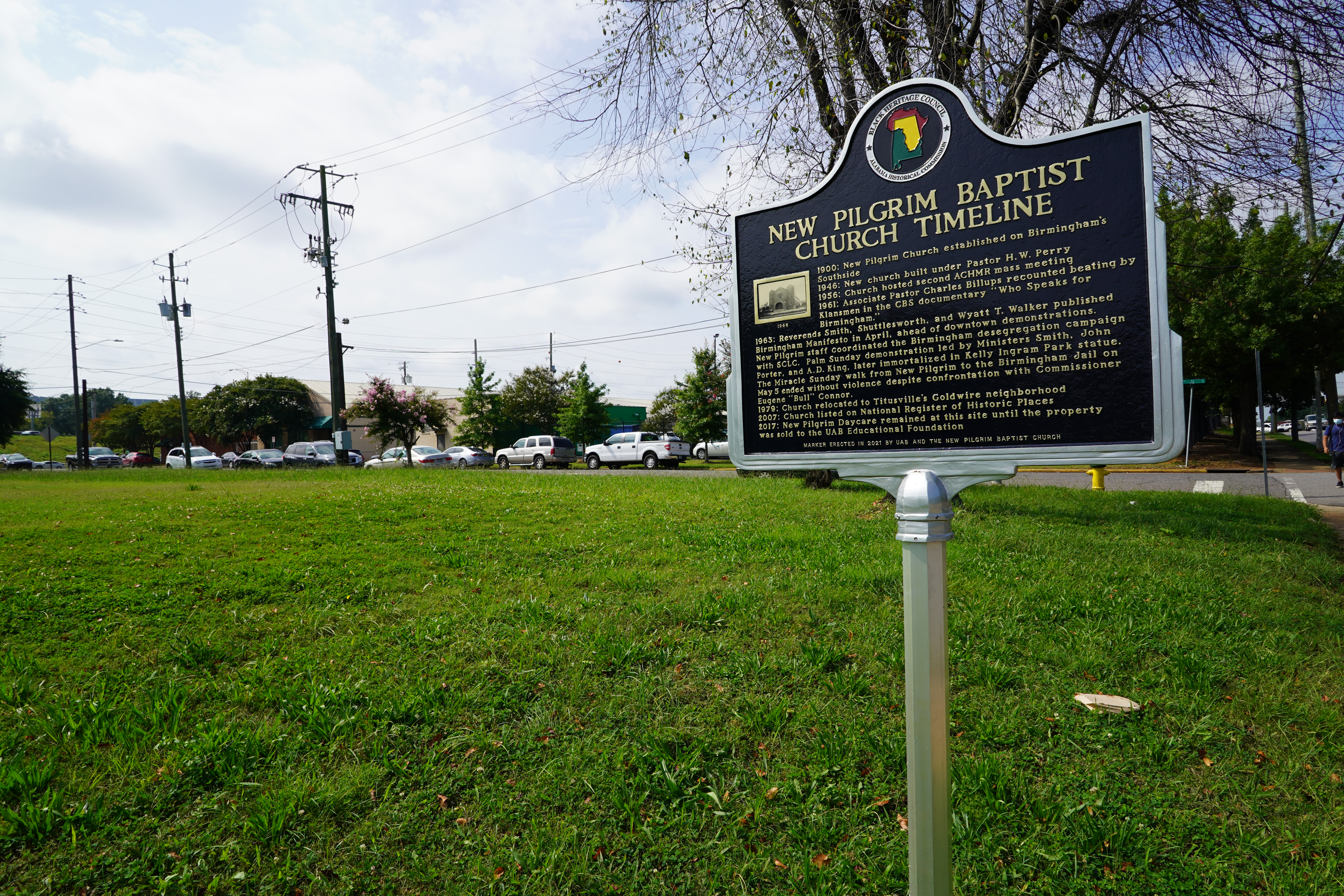
New Pilgrim Baptist Church Plaque

New Pilgrim Baptist Church was a historic church at 903 Sixth Ave South in Birmingham, Alabama. It was built in a contemporary Gothic Revival style and was added to the National Register of Historic Places in 2007. In 1979, the congregation moved two miles west to a new building, located at 708 Goldwire Place Southwest. It continued to use the historic church as a day care center for many years. In 2017, the building was sold to the University of Alabama at Birmingham and razed. In 2021 a historical marker was erected at the site.
