= First Baptist Church (Greenville, Alabama) =

Historic church in Alabama, United States

- U.S. National Register of Historic Places
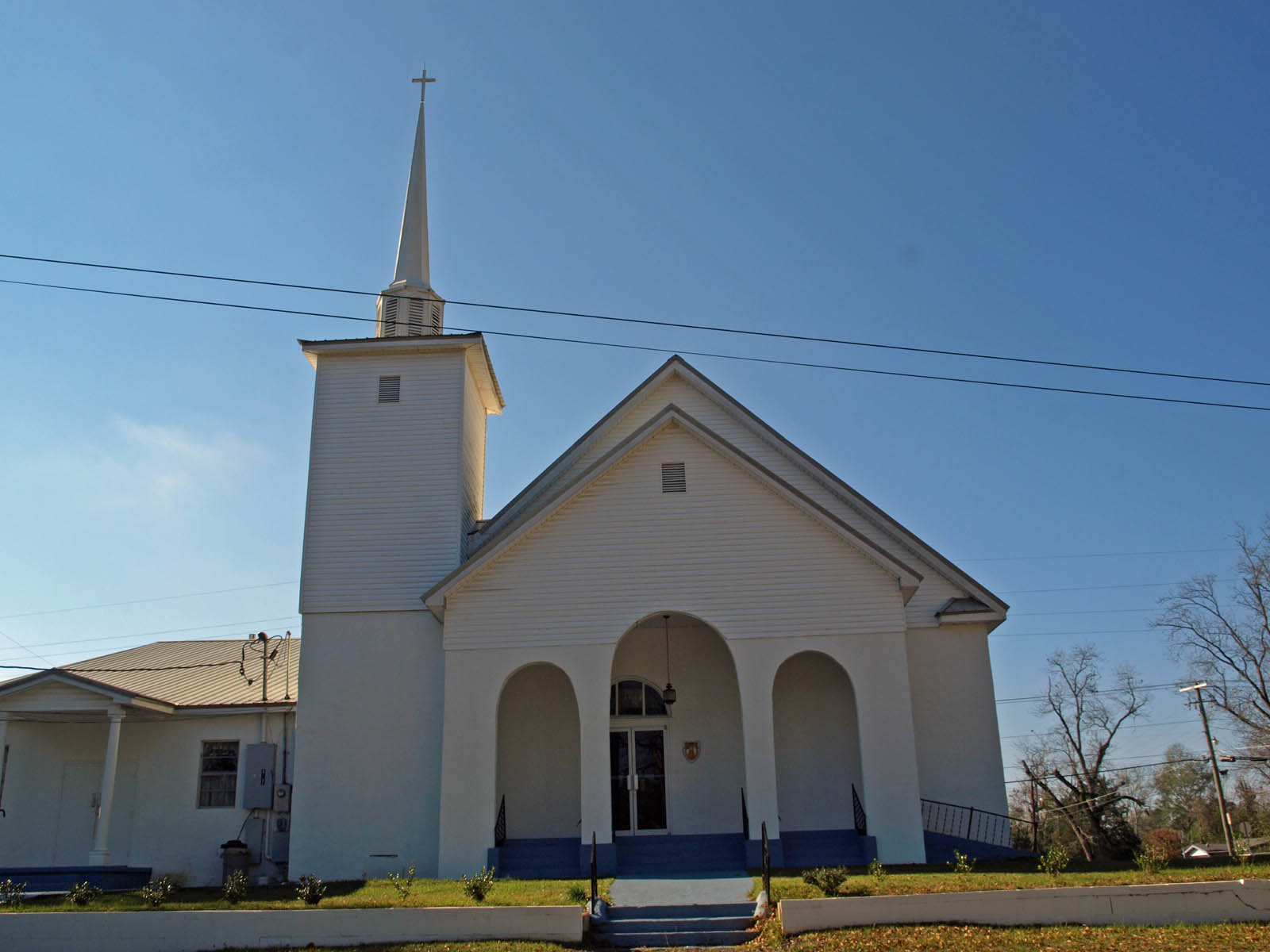
- The church in November 2013

- Location within Alabama Location within the United States
- Location: 707 South St., Greenville, Alabama
- Coordinates: 31°49′51″N 86°38′7″W
- Area: less than one acre
- Built: 1870
- MPS: Greenville MRA
- NRHP reference No.: 86001799
- Added to NRHP: September 4, 1986

First Baptist Church (First Missionary Baptist Church) is a historic Baptist church at 707 South Street in Greenville, Alabama, United States. It was founded and built in 1870 by Rev. Stuart Adams and added to the National Register of Historic Places in 1986.
