= New Rising Star Baptist Church =

Historic church in Alabama, United States

- U.S. National Register of Historic Places
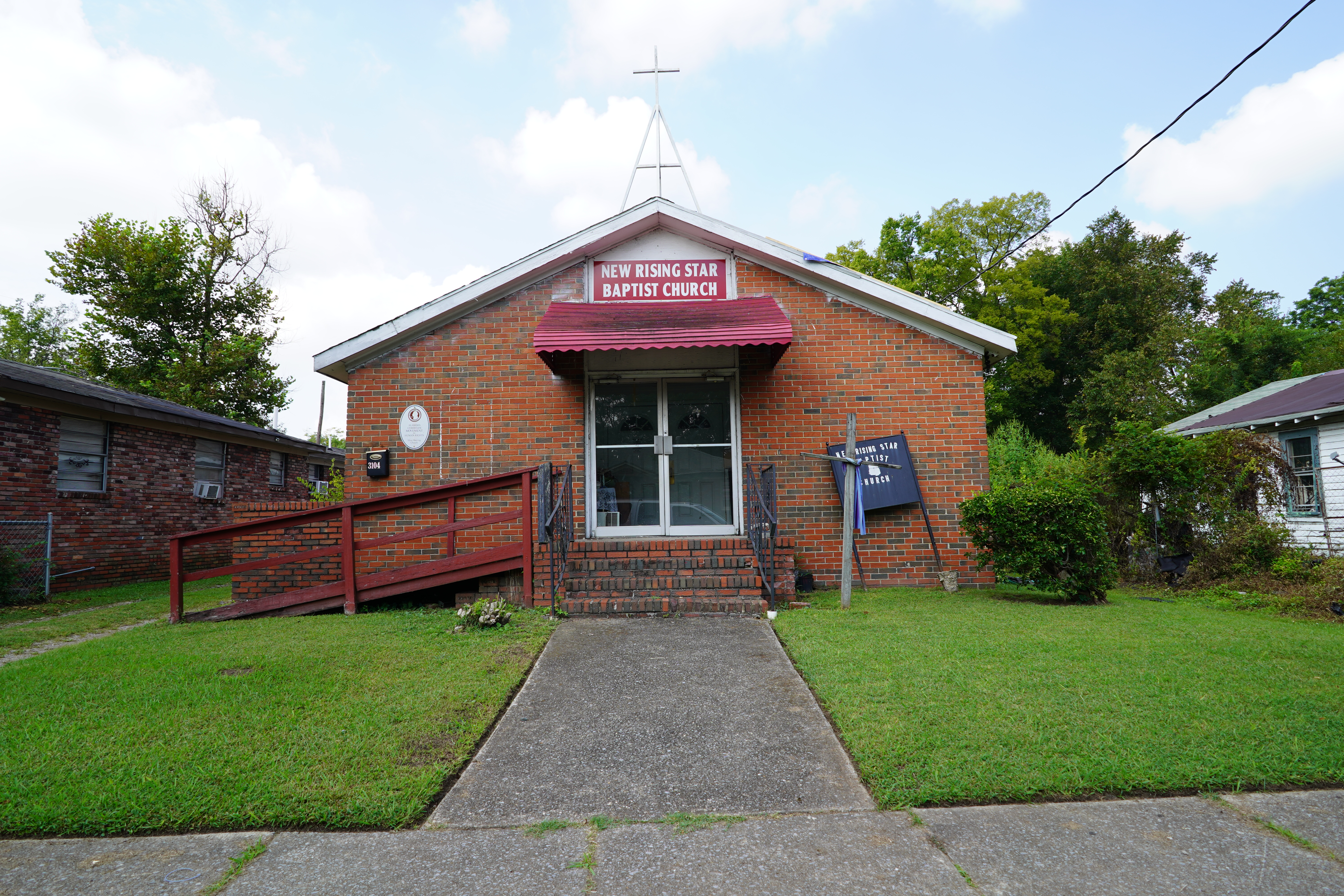

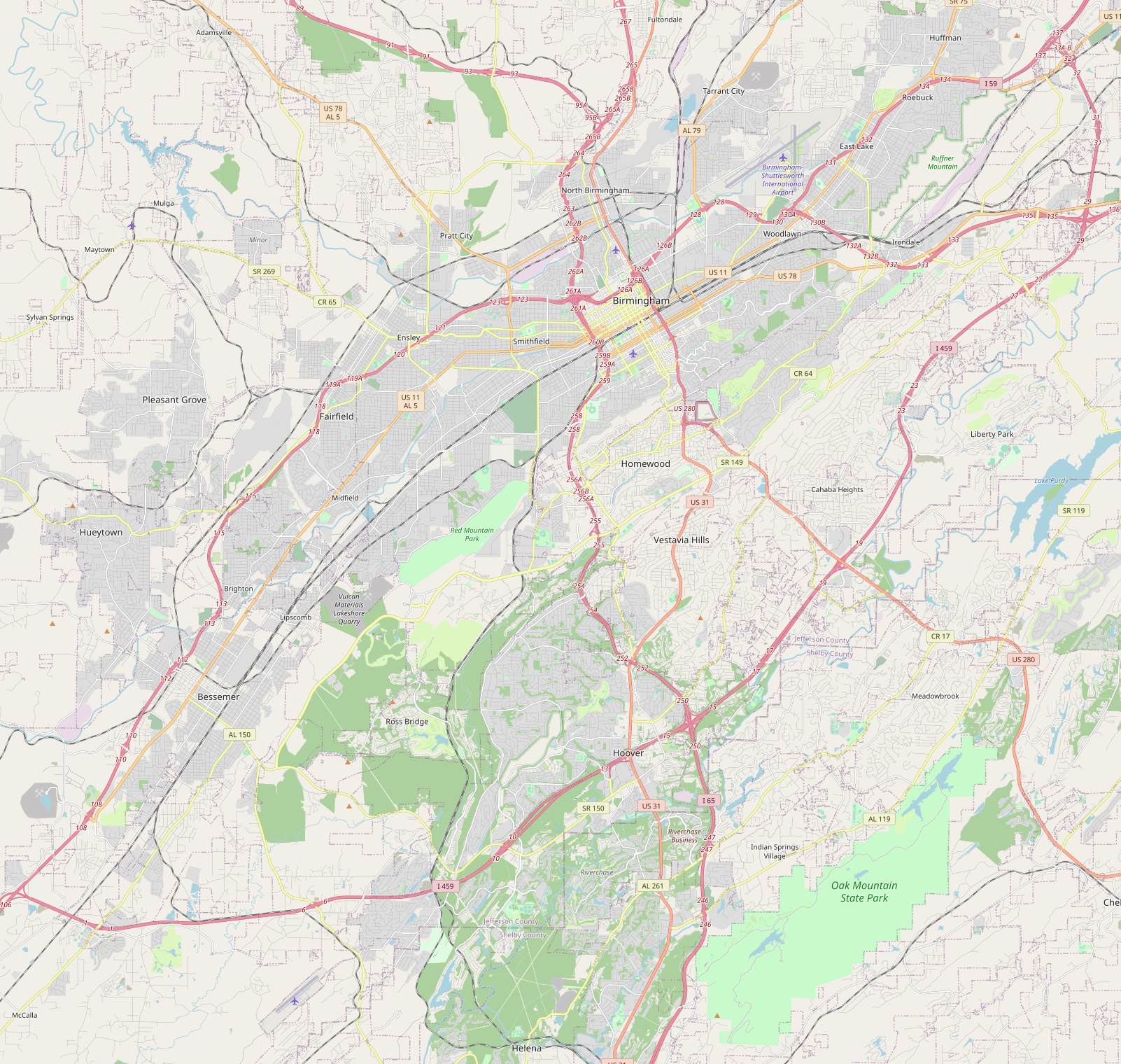
- Location within Birmingham, Alabama Location within Alabama Location within the United States
- Location: 3104 33rd Place N, Collegeville, Birmingham, Alabama
- Coordinates: 33°33′16″N 86°47′59″W
- Area: less than one acre
- Built: 1958
- MPS: Civil Rights Movement in Birmingham, Alabama MPS
- NRHP reference No.: 05000305
- Added to NRHP: April 19, 2005

New Rising Star Baptist Church is a historic church at 3104 33rd Place N, Collegeville in Birmingham, Alabama. It was built in 1958 and added to the National Register of Historic Places in 2005.
