= Dudleyville, Alabama =

- Unincorporated community
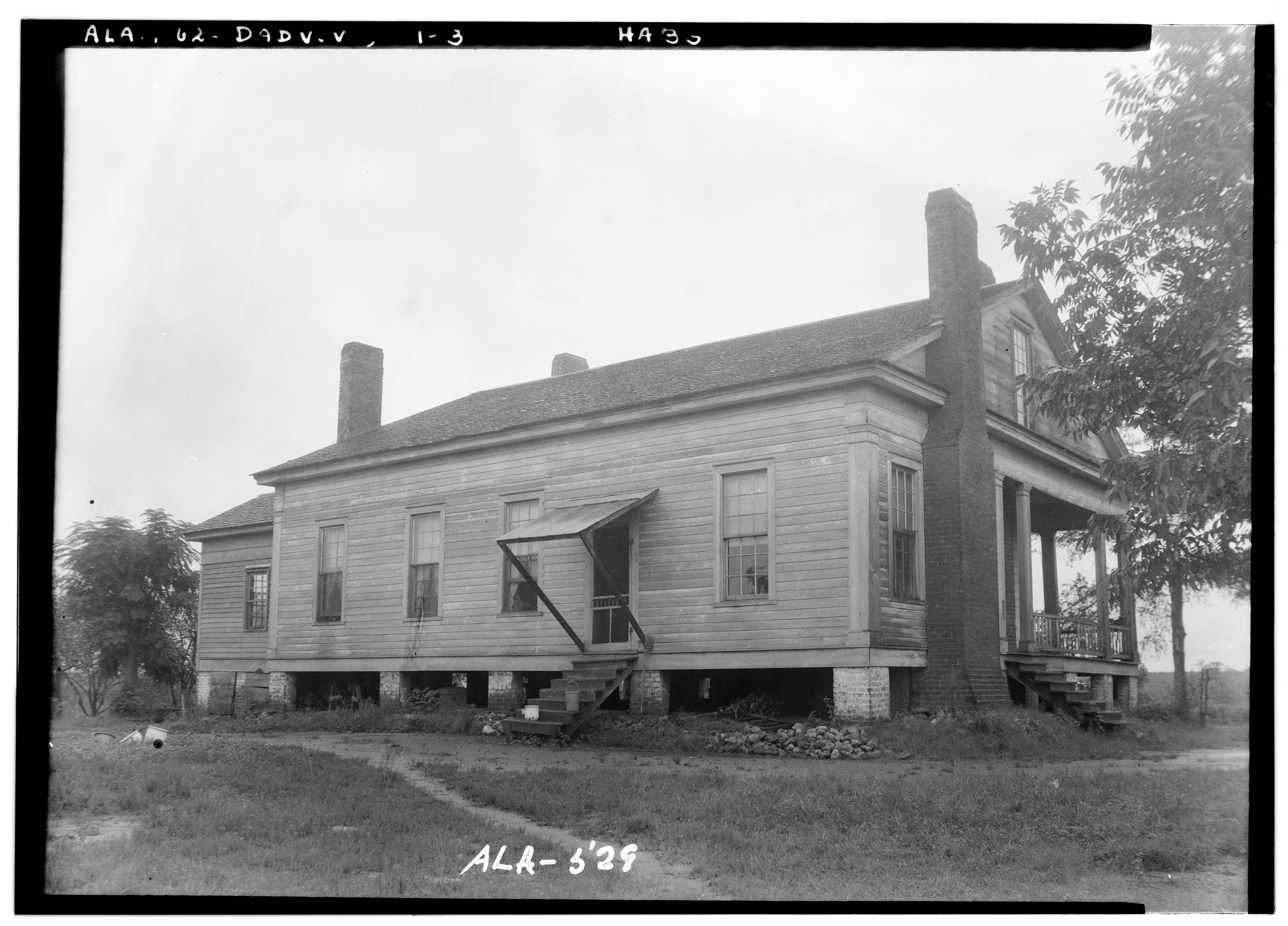
- Black-Gilling House, taken as part of the Historic American Buildings Survey

- Location within Alabama Location within the United States
- Coordinates: 32°54′54″N 85°36′00″W
- Country: United States
- State: Alabama
- County: Tallapoosa
- Elevation: 741 ft (226 m)
- Time zone: UTC-6 (Central (CST))
  - Summer (DST): UTC-5 (CDT)
- Area codes: 256 & 938
- GNIS feature ID: 117634

Dudleyville, also known as Pittsborough, is an unincorporated community in Tallapoosa County, Alabama, United States. Dudleyville was named for Peter Dudley, who established the first trading post in the area. The town was incorporated on February 2, 1839. A post office was operated in Dudleyville from 1836 to 1907. Major Lemuel Montgomery, the first American soldier killed in the Battle of Horseshoe Bend, was formerly buried in the Dudleyville cemetery, before his grave was moved to Horseshoe Bend National Military Park. Abram Mordecai, a trader who installed the first cotton gin in Alabama, lived for a time in Dudleyville. It was here that Albert J. Pickett visited him in 1847 and gathered information from him to use in his History of Alabama. County Line Baptist Church, which is located east of Dudleyville, is listed on the National Register of Historic Places.

== Notable person ==
- William S. Key, former Warden of Oklahoma State Penitentiary and Major general during World War II.
- Claude Pepper, former U.S. Senator and U.S. Representative from Florida, was born near Dudleyville.
