= Aimwell Baptist Church =

Historic church in Alabama, United States

- Aimwell Historical Bible Cathedral Inc
- U.S. National Register of Historic Places
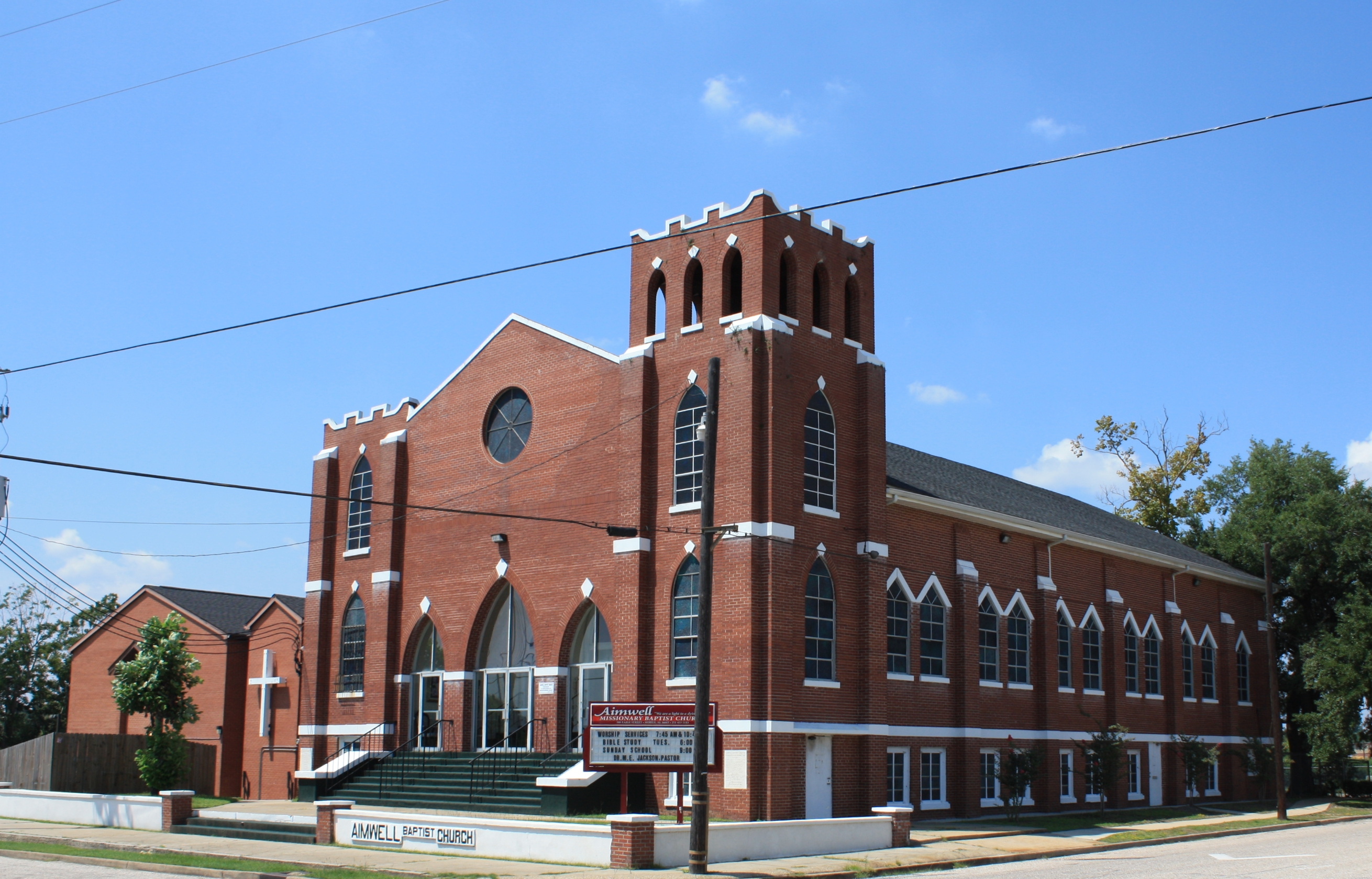

- Location within Mobile, Alabama Location within Alabama Location within the United States
- Location: 500 Earle Street, Mobile, Alabama, United States
- Coordinates: 30°41′58″N 88°3′10″W
- Built: 1946
- Architect: Heningburg, Nathaniel
- Architectural style: Gothic Revival
- NRHP reference No.: 08000458
- Added to NRHP: May 29, 2008

Aimwell Baptist Church is a historic African American church in Mobile, Alabama. The Baptist congregation was established in 1890 by two brothers. It took two years for the erection of the first building. The current building, with Gothic Revival influences, was designed in 1946 by Nathaniel Heningburg and incorporates elements from the original structure. It was added to the National Register of Historic Places on May 29, 2008.
