= Stone Street Baptist Church =

Historic church in Alabama, United States

- U.S. National Register of Historic Places
- Alabama Register of Landmarks and Heritage
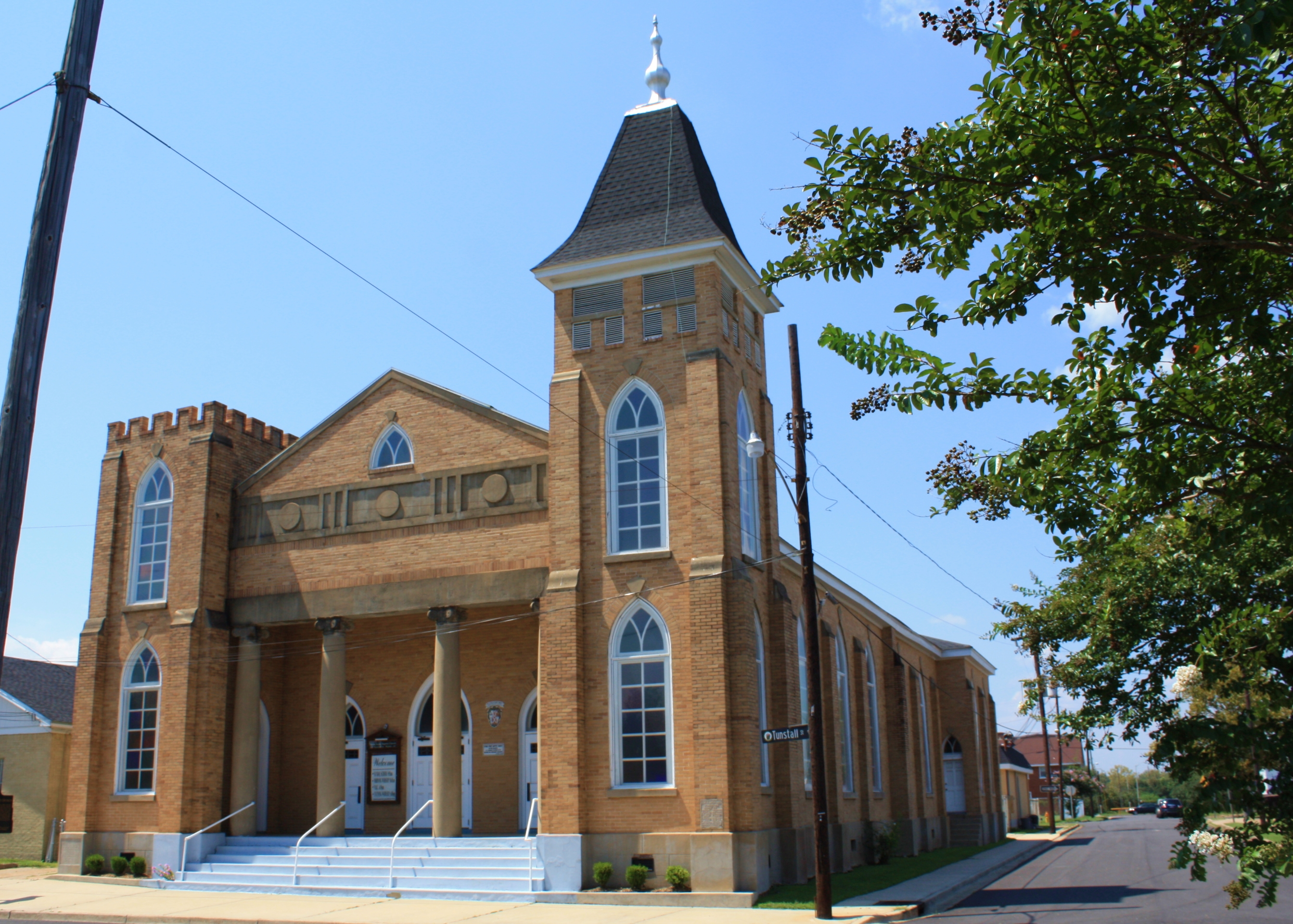

- Location within Mobile, Alabama Location within Alabama Location within the United States
- Location: Mobile, Alabama
- Coordinates: 30°41′46″N 88°3′6″W
- Built: 1843
- NRHP reference No.: 85001749

Significant dates
- Added to NRHP: August 8, 1985
- Designated ARLH: November 26, 1975

Stone Street Baptist Church is a historic African-American Baptist church in Mobile, Alabama. The congregation was established well before the American Civil War, with Stone Street Baptist recognized today as one of Alabama's most influential African-American Baptist churches. It was placed on the National Register of Historic Places on August 8, 1985.

== History ==
Stone Street Baptist Church was the second church building constructed by members of this congregation. In 1843, the white trustees of Saint Anthony Street Baptist Church purchased a plot of land at the southwest corner of Chestnut and Tunstall streets for the use of the African branch of the church, which became the Stone Street Baptist Church. Twenty-five years later the title to the property was transferred to the African-American trustees of the Stone Street Baptist Church.

The first African-American pastor for the congregation was Richard Fields. In 1859, after descendants of the Clotilda settled in Africatown, they also joined in with members of Stone Street Baptist Church. These descendants had ancestral roots in Ghana, Togo, Nigeria, and the Kingdom of Whydah, Dahomey, located in present-day Benin. In 1864, Reverend Benjamin Franklin Burke of Richmond, Virginia, became pastor and led the congregation for 38 years, until his death on September 27, 1902. It was Burke who moved the congregation to 311 Cleveland Street in 1870. Cleveland Street was later changed to Tunstall Street in honor of former pastor Dr. Charles A. Tunstall. Reverend K. D. Watkins, who pastored from 1907 to 1915, rebuilt Stone Street Baptist Church in 1909. The church received a major renovation in 1931 under the leadership of Reverend M. C. Cleveland.
