= Wheatland Baptist Cemetery =

Historic cemetery in Monroe County, New York

- U.S. National Register of Historic Places
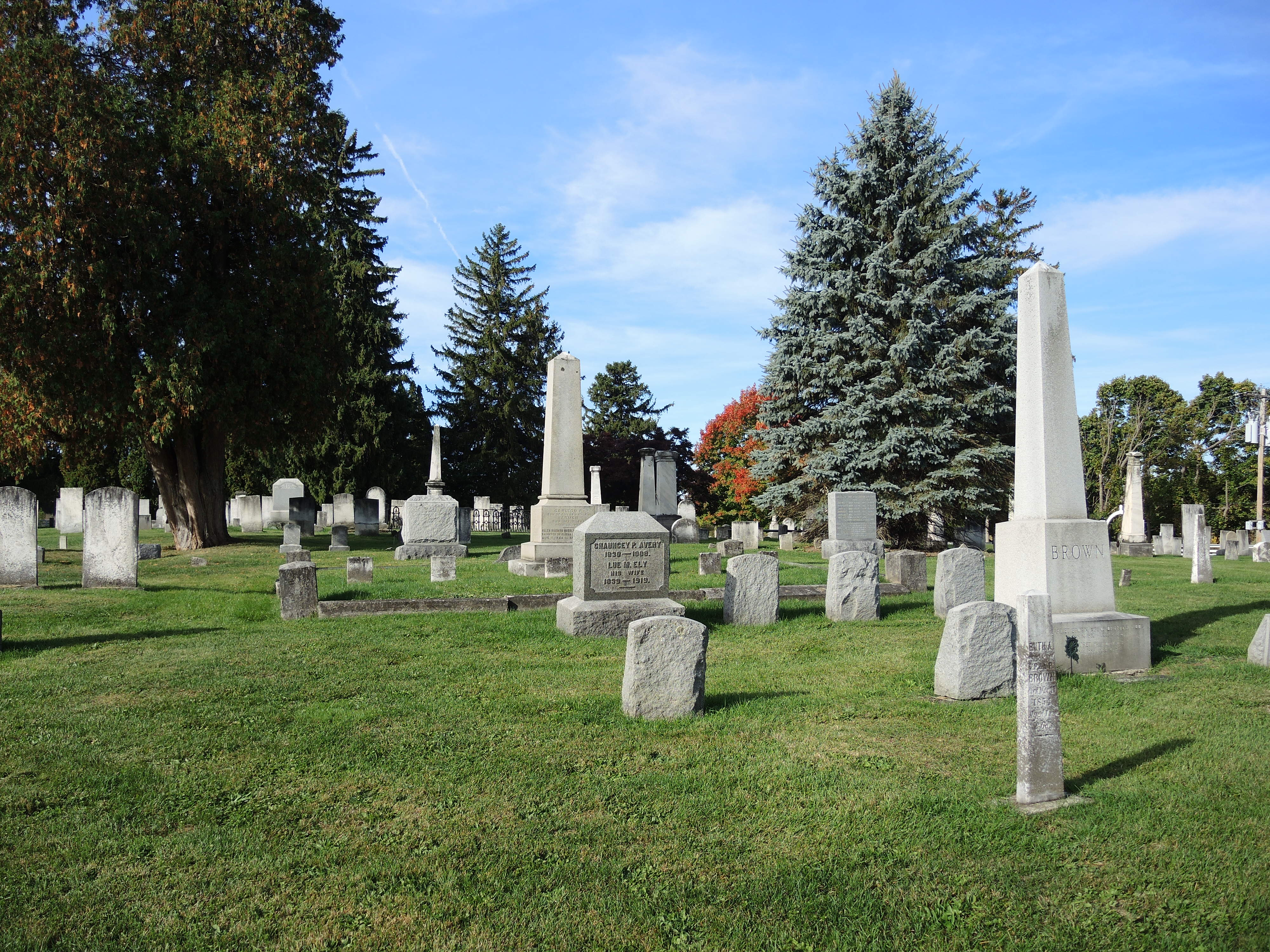

- Location within New York Location within the United States
- Location: McGinnis, Belcoda and Harmon Rds., Belcoda, New York
- Coordinates: 43°1′33″N 77°50′49″W
- Area: 3.4 acres (1.4 ha)
- NRHP reference No.: 05001536
- Added to NRHP: January 18, 2006

Wheatland Baptist Cemetery, once known as Belcoda Cemetery, and currently known as the Wheatland Rural Cemetery, is a historic cemetery located in the hamlet of Belcoda in the town of Wheatland in Monroe County, New York. It is the earliest cemetery in the town of Wheatland and contains the graves of many of the earliest settlers and prominent residents of the town. It contains stones that date from 1811 to the present, ranging from simple carved early stones to more elaborate mid- and late-Victorian monuments. The name was changed in 2014 by the Trustees to reflect that it is a non-denominational association.

It was listed on the National Register of Historic Places in 2006.

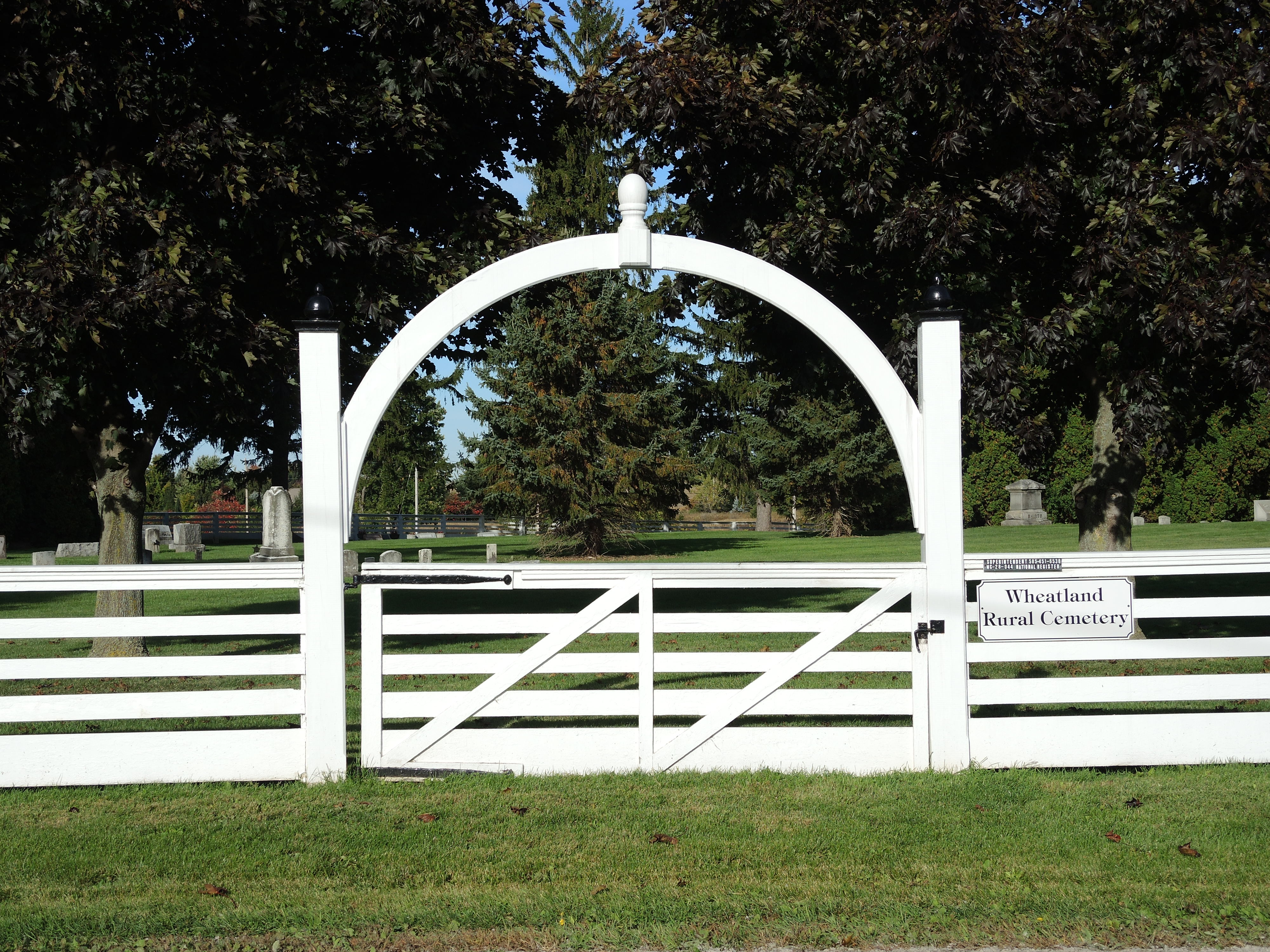
Gate

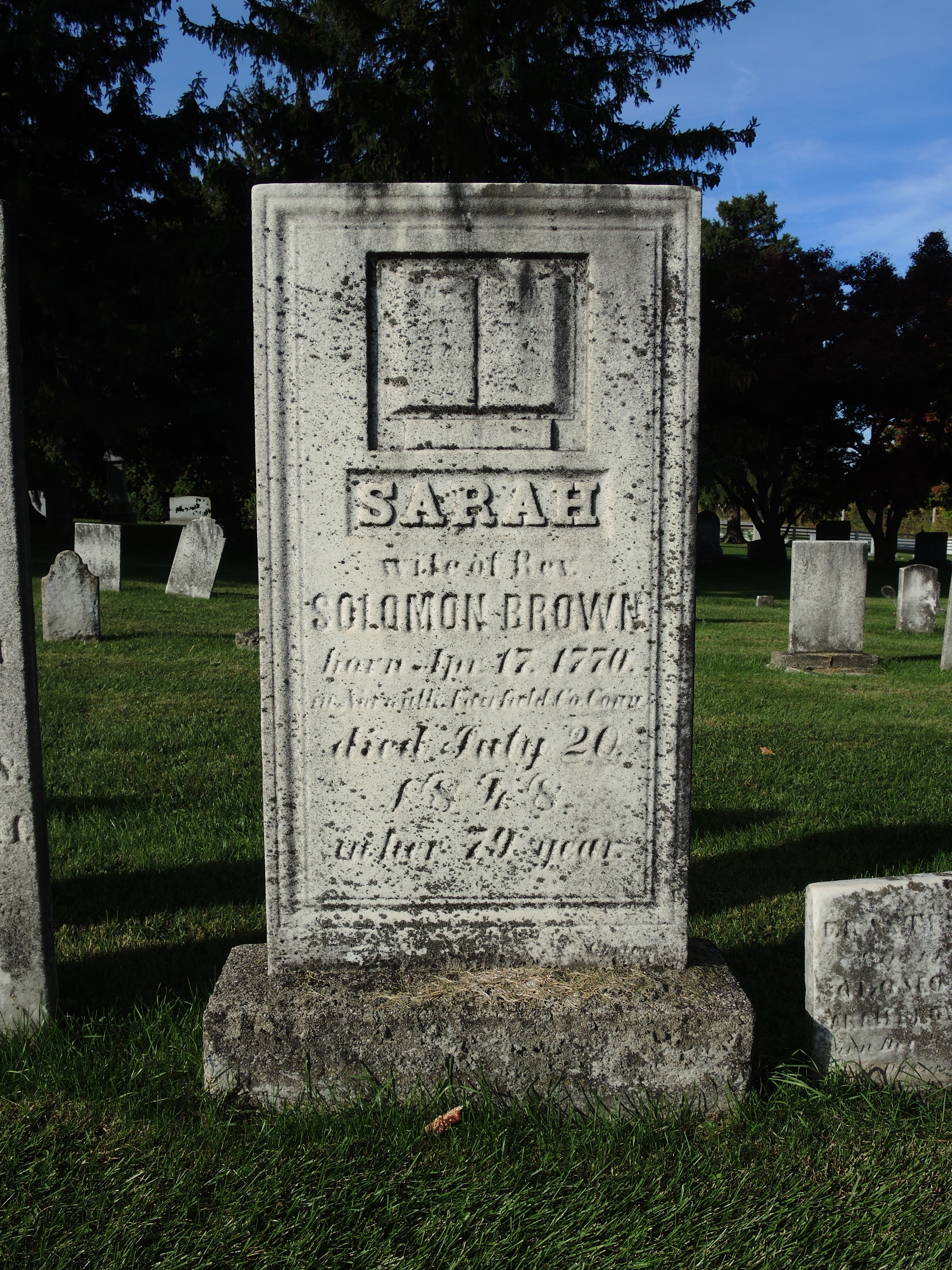
Gravestone of Sarah Brown

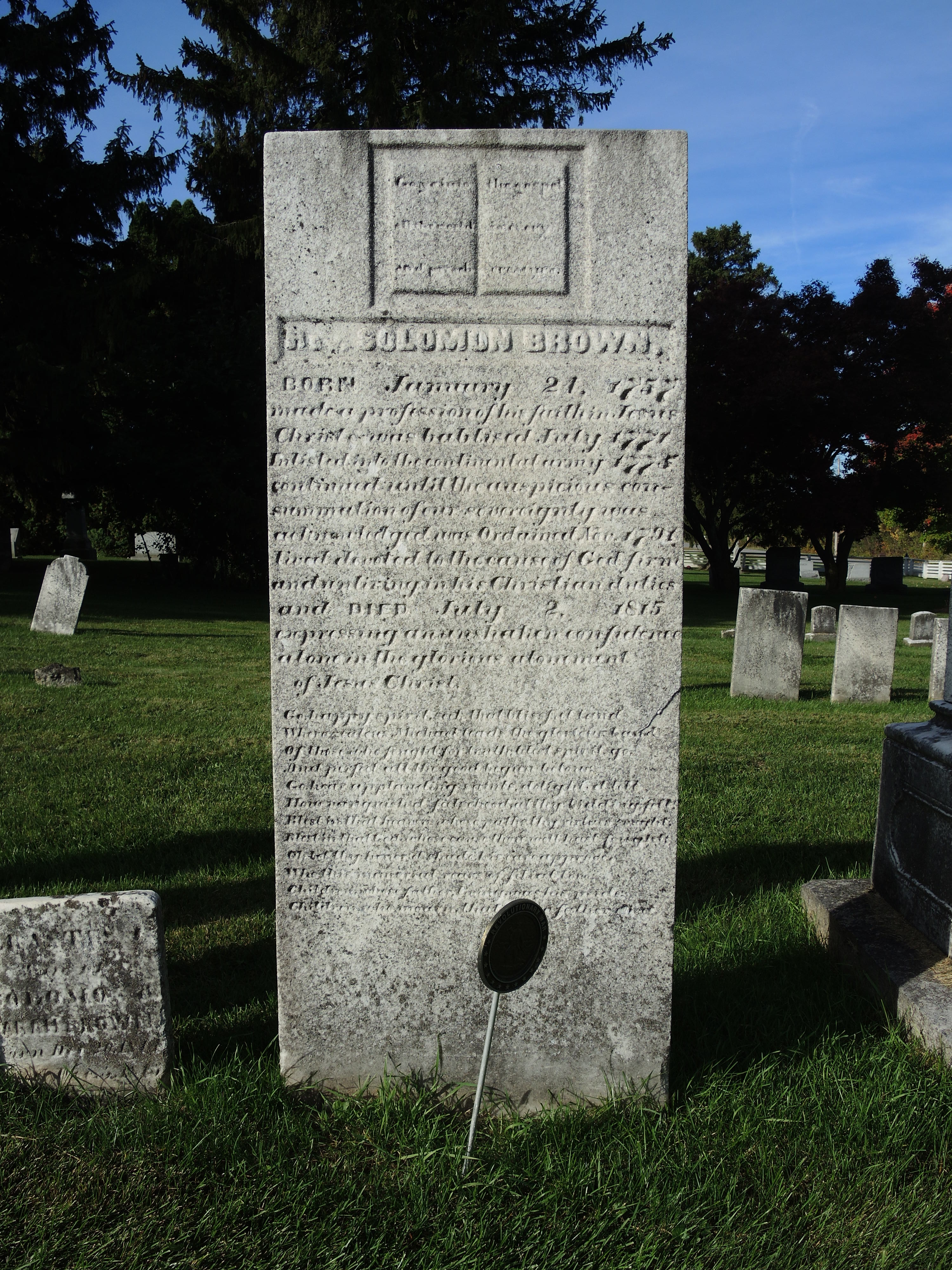
Gravestone of Solomon Brown

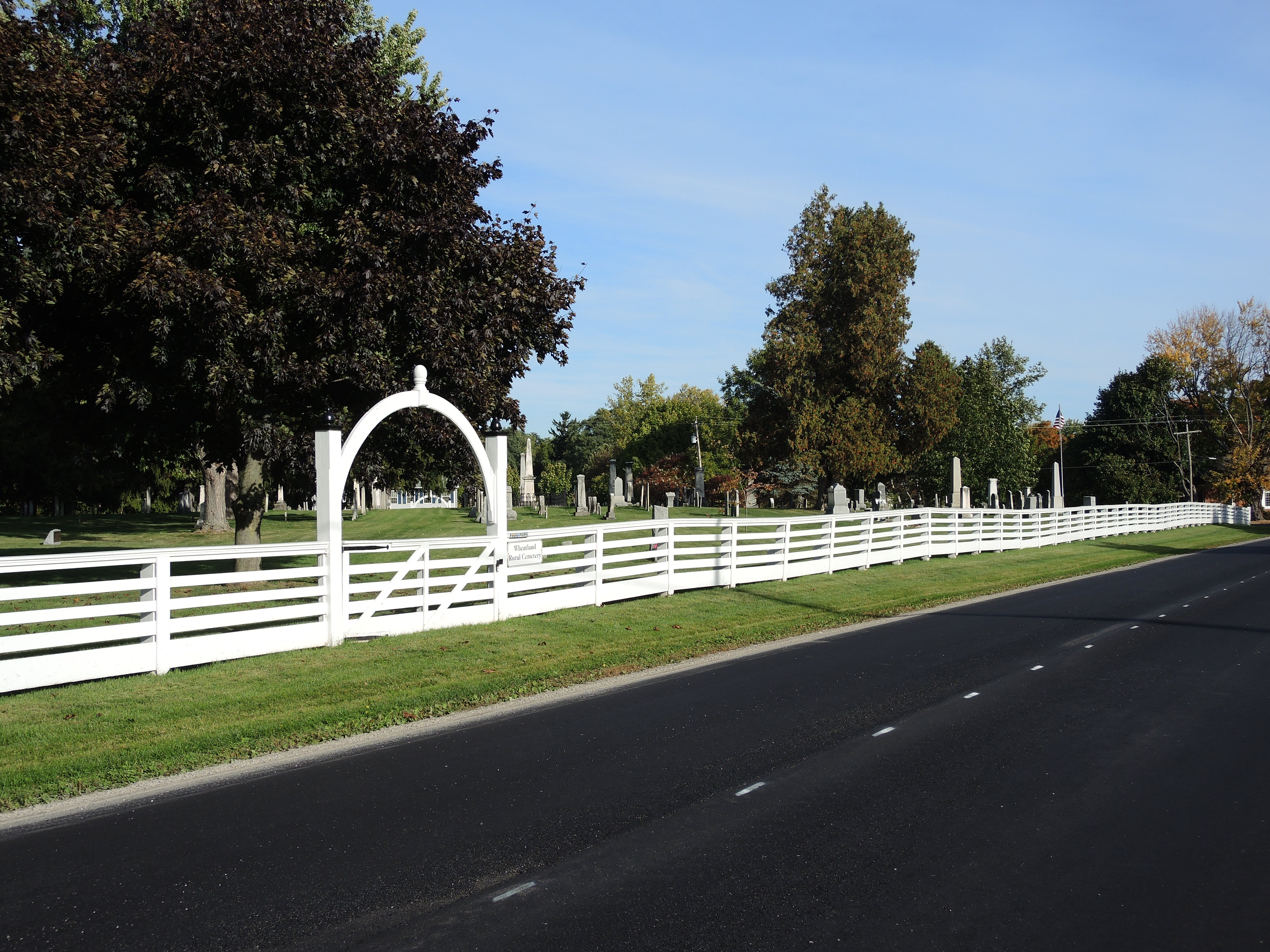
View from McGinnis Road

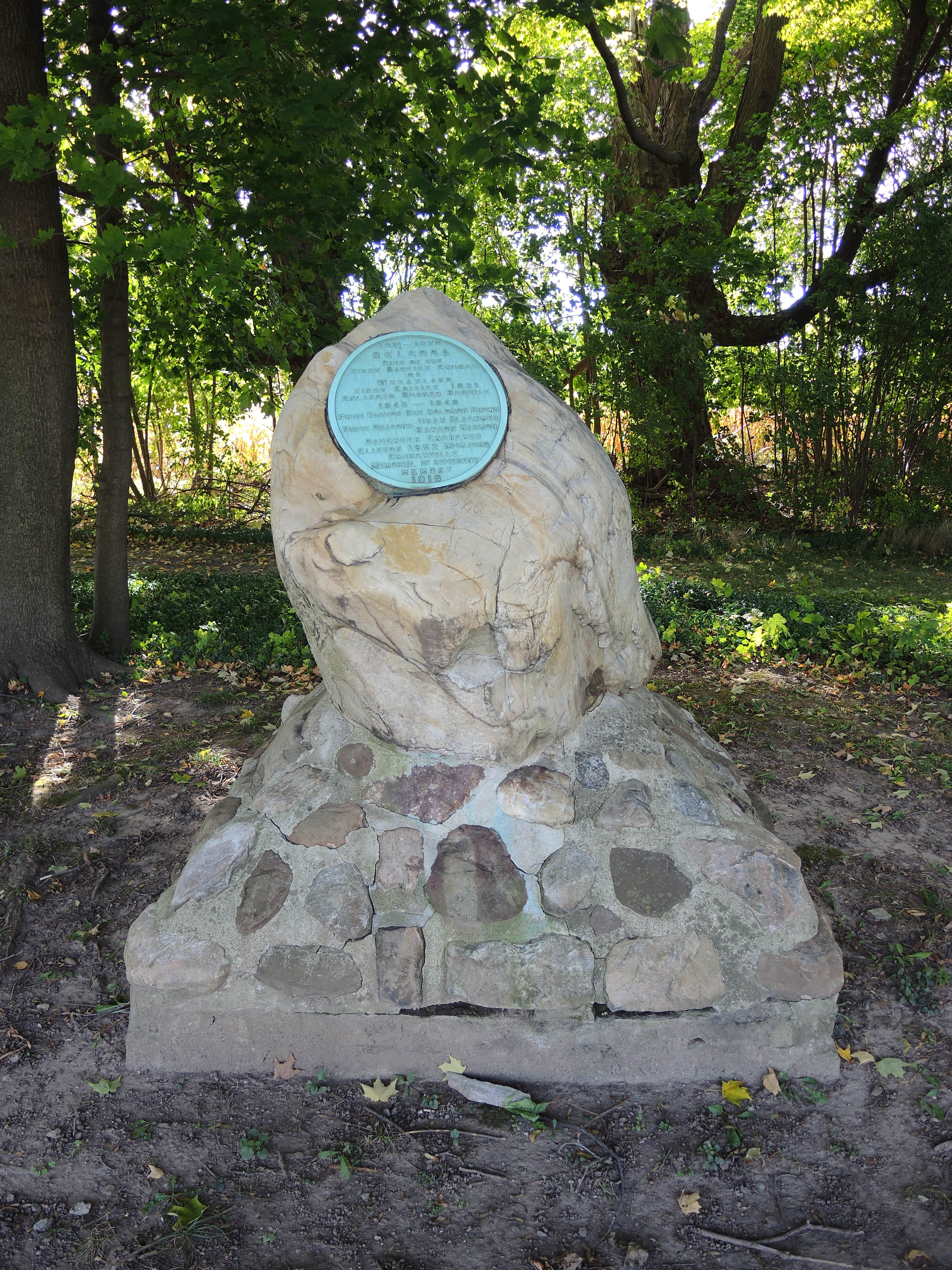
Memorial for the First Baptist Church of Wheatland

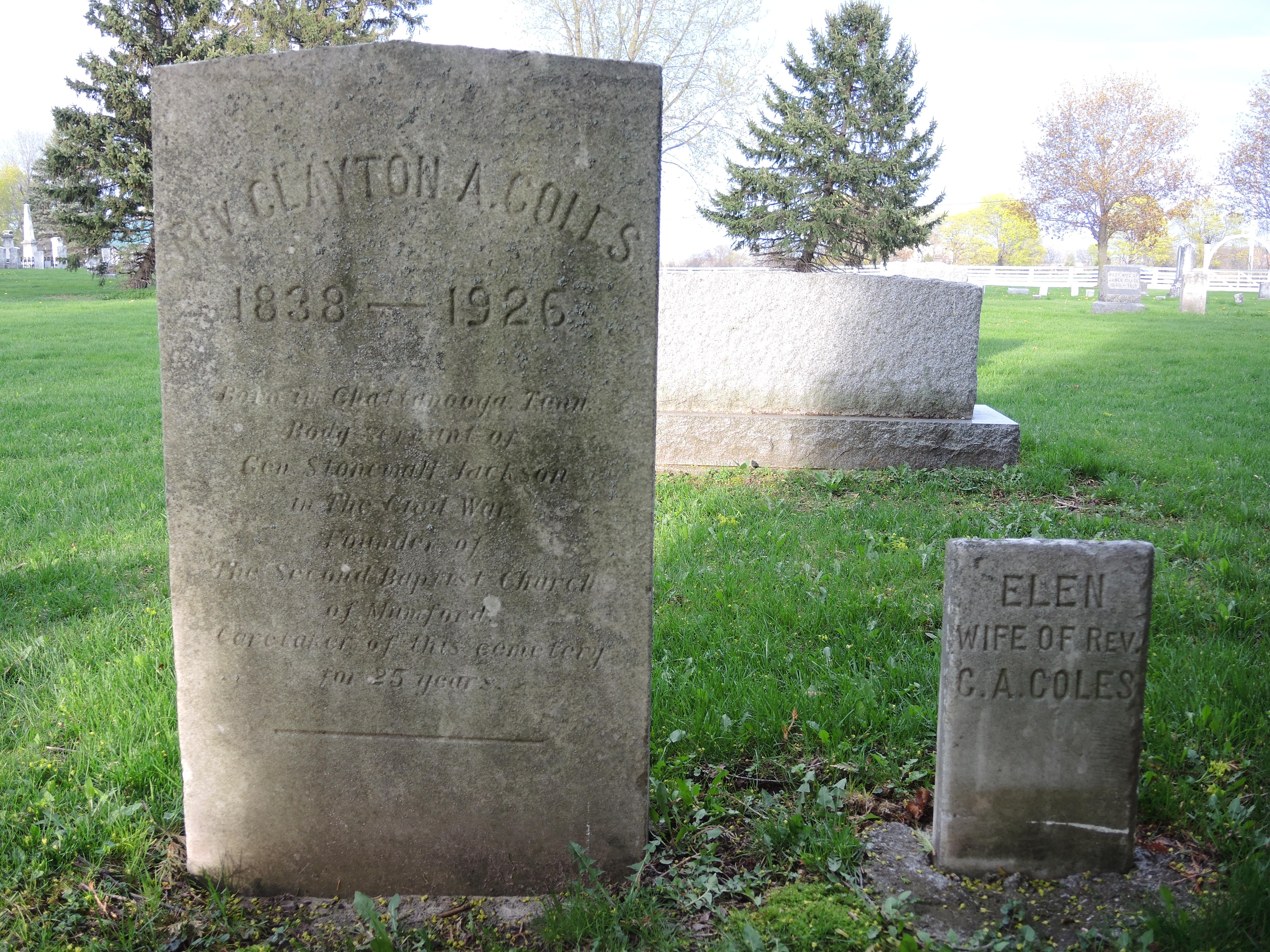
Gravestones of the Reverend Clayton A. and Elen Coles. The Reverend was Stonewall Jackson's body servant during the Civil War.
