= Michele Henderson =

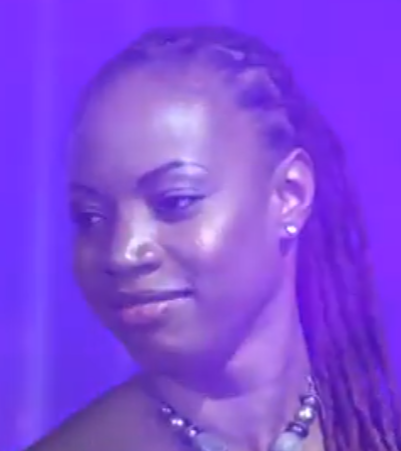
- Performing in 2014

Background information
- Born: c. 1980
- Origin: Saint Patrick Parish, Dominica
- Genres: Jazz, cadence-lypso and Zouk

Michele Henderson (born c. 1980) is a singer-songwriter from Dominica. She performs internationally. Her song "Celebrating Caricom" was chosen as the anthem of the Caribbean Community in 2014.

== Biography ==
Henderson grew up in a musical family in Grand Bay, Saint Patrick Parish. Her grandfather sang and played several instruments. As a result, her father grew up in a musical environment. He played a goatskin drum, a twelve-string guitar, and a harmonica, and wrote traditional songs for the folk group La Jeune Etoile. As a result, she, as his daughter, also developed in a musical environment, with a lot of singing at home. At home, they listened mainly to international country, calypso, and reggae artists, and from her own country, to Gordon Henderson (Exile One), Ophelia Marie, and the Midnight Groovers. She herself plays several styles, including ccadence-lypso and zouk.

She sang in a youth choir and attended the Kairi School of Music, where she studied music theory and learned to play the classical flute. She often sang lead vocals in her school's musical performances. At 14, she won fourth place in a regional singing competition in Barbados, which made her realize that she could compete at a high level. In 1995, she won first prize at the Dominica Festival of Arts (DomFestA) with her song "My Pride". From the age of 16, she was a flutist and vocalist in the jazz band Impact. It was there that she met her future husband, who played bass. She has performed with jazz greats such as Stanley Clarke and Chick Corea.

After Impact broke up, she received support from her old bandmates during her solo career. She performs annually at the World Creole Music Festival. She has also performed at the Antilliaanse Feesten in Hoogstraten, Belgium (2004), the Jazz Festival of Saint Lucia , the Roskilde Festival in Denmark, and the Imatra Big Band Festival in Finland. She has released six albums in total (as of 2018). In 2014, her song "Celebrating Caricom" was chosen as the anthem of the Caribbean Community (Caricom).

She writes songs in a variety of ways, sometimes while working around the house, a lyric might come to her mind and she'll later write a melody to it, or conversely, a melody might first come to her mind and she'll write a lyric to it. She writes her lyrics in English and French Creole, although she hasn't spoken the latter language all her life because her grandmother forbade it. Because of her French Creole songs, she has a larger listener base in Guadeloupe and Martinique than in Dominica. She also collaborates with artists from those two islands.

She is a goodwill ambassador for her country and after Hurricane Maria she gave several benefit performances.
