= Celebrating Caricom =

Single by Michele Henderson
- Language: English
- Written: 2014
- Published: 2014
- Released: 2014
- Recorded: 2014
- Genre: Hymn; Calypso music
- Length: 0:52
- Songwriter: Michele Henderson
- Composer: Michele Henderson
- Lyricist: Michele Henderson

Celebrating Caricom, also known as CARICOM Song, is the official anthem of the Caribbean Community (Caricom). The song was written by singer Michele Henderson from Dominica.

== Background ==
CARICOM is an intergovernmental organisation that is a political and economic union of 15 member states in the Caribbean, which began with the establishment of the West Indies Federation in 1958. CARICOM was officially established on 4 July 1973 with the signing of the Treaty of Chaguaramas.

It was decided that for the occasion of the organization's 40th anniversary, an anthem would be chosen through a competition in 2013. The winning song had prize money of USD 10,000 for the winner, USD 5,000 for second place, and USD 2,500 for third place.

Michele Henderson won the competition with this song, after qualifying among the six finalists in her home country of Dominica. Suriname selected six finalists from 22 entries and the other countries also submitted six entries. The judging took place at the Secretariat of the Caribbean Community in Georgetown in Guyana. The first official performance took place on Tuesday 1 July 2014 at the opening ceremony for the Thirty-Fifth Regional Meeting of the Conference of Heads of Government in Antigua and Barbuda.

== See also ==
- Anthems of international organizations
