= French Louisianians =

French ethnic group in the United States

Louisianais (French)
- The flag of French Louisiana

Total population
- Indeterminable

Regions with significant populations
- Alabama, Arkansas, Illinois, Indiana, Iowa, Louisiana, Minnesota, Mississippi, Missouri, Ohio, Wisconsin, California, Texas

Languages
- Louisiana French; Louisiana Creole; Cajun English; Missouri French; Isleño Spanish (in Louisiana); Franglais; Frespañol (in Louisiana)

Religion
- Roman Catholic

Related ethnic groups
- Cajuns, Louisiana Creoles, Alabama Creoles, Arkansas Creoles, French Americans, French-Canadian Americans, Haitians, Latin Americans

French Louisianians (French: Louisianais; Spanish: Luisianenses Franceses), also known as Louisiana French or French Creoles (French: Créoles), refer to people of French-American ethnicity native to the areas of the United States formerly comprising the colony of French Louisiana. Distinct regional subgroups include the Alabama Creoles (including Alabama Cajans), Arkansas Creoles, Louisiana Creoles (including Louisiana Cajuns), and the Missouri French (Illinois Country Creoles).

== Etymology ==
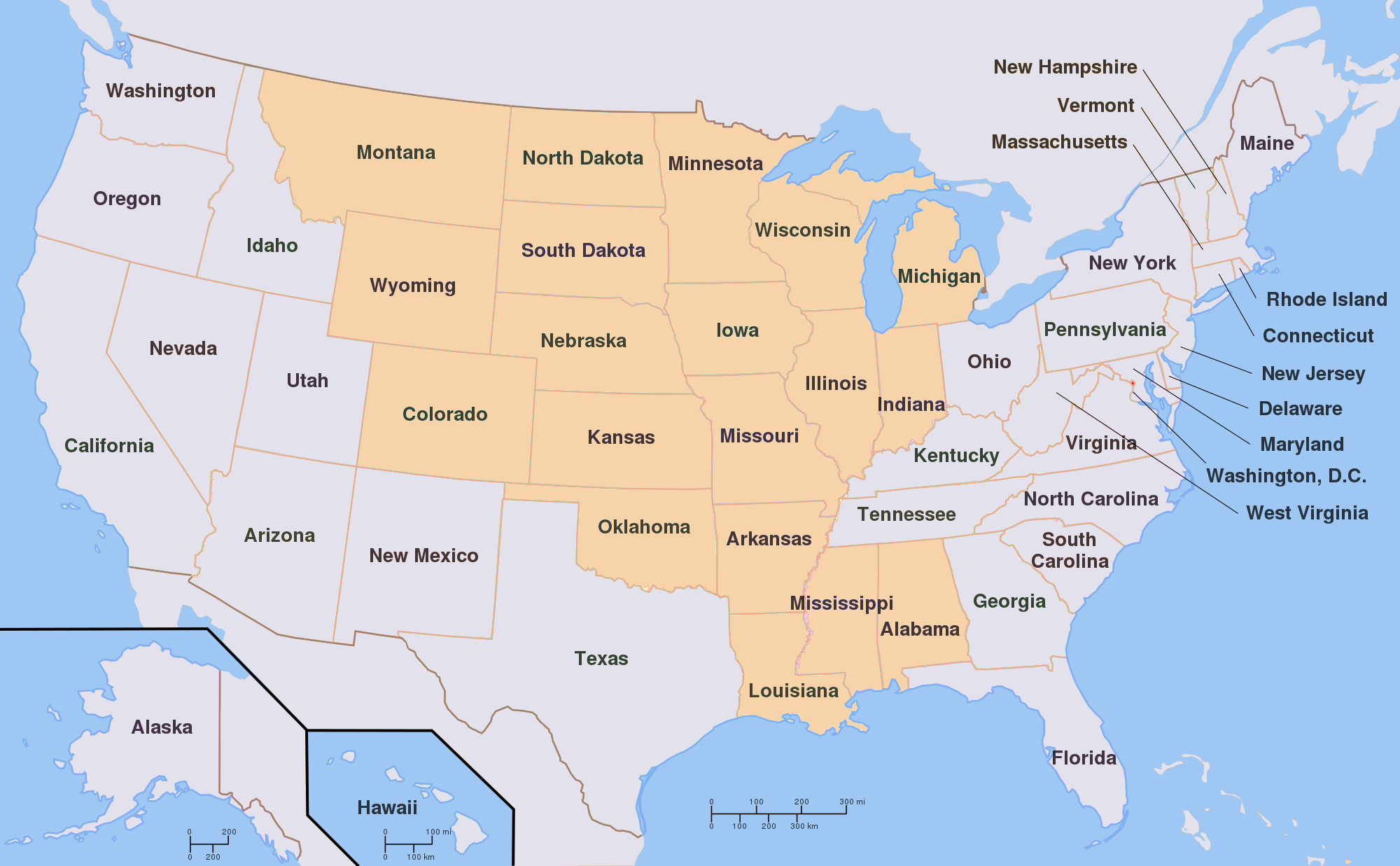
States established from French Louisiana.

The term Créole was originally used by French settlers in North America to distinguish people born in French Louisiana from those born elsewhere, thus drawing a distinction between Old-World Europeans and Africans from their Creole descendants born in the Viceroyalty of New France. The term Louisanese (French: Louisianais) was used as a demonym for Louisiana French people prior to the integration of the Louisiana Territory, but fell into disuse after the Orleans Territory gained admission into the American Union as the State of Louisiana:

"The elegant olive-browned Louisianese- the rosy-cheeked maiden from La belle riviere (La Belle Rivière is the native Louisiana French name for Ohio)..."

== Louisiana French Language ==
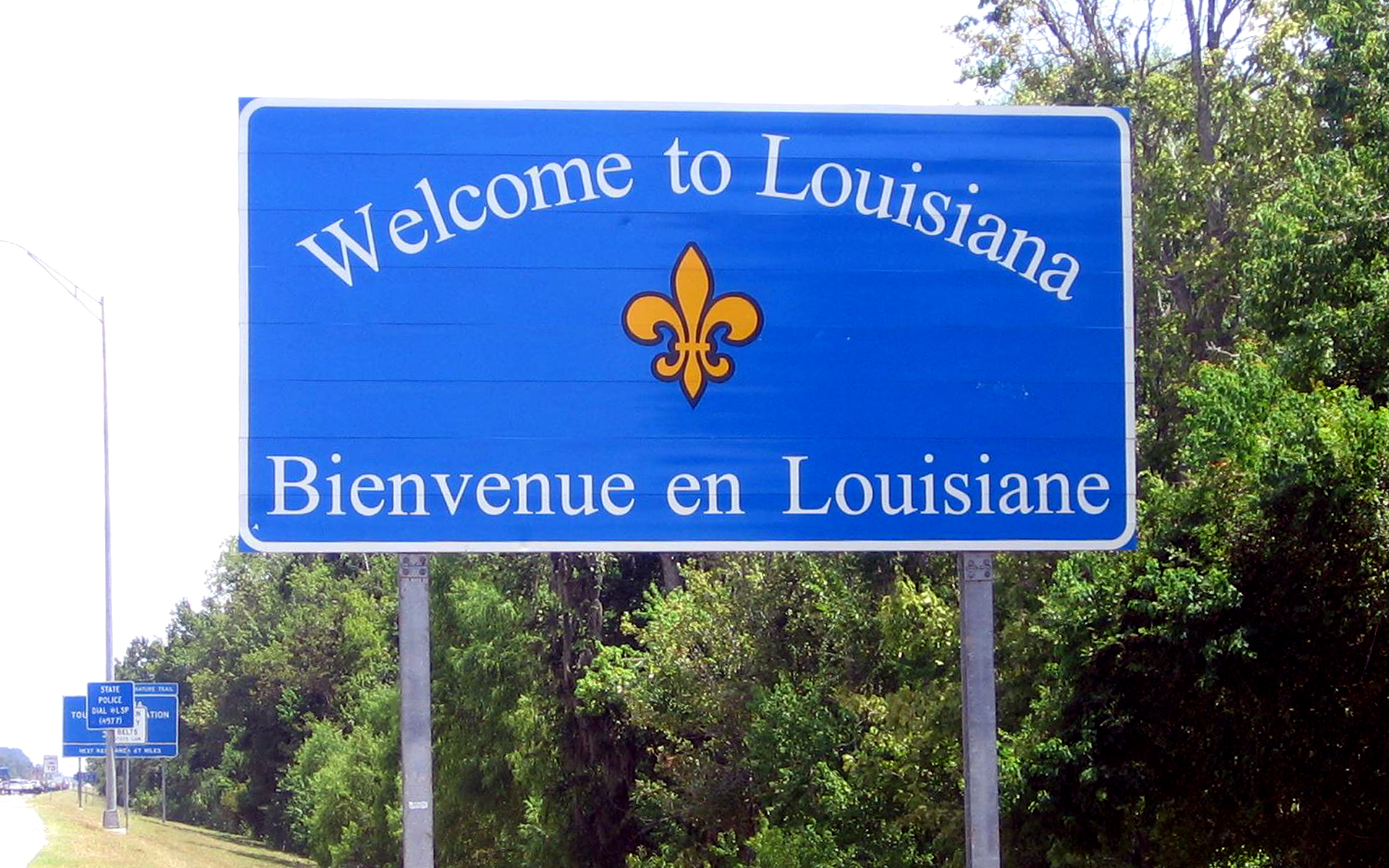
The State of Louisiana's welcome sign.

The Louisiana French speak similar dialects of French, with regional varieties including Lower Louisiana French, Upper Louisiana French, and Louisiana Creole.

== Alabama Creoles ==
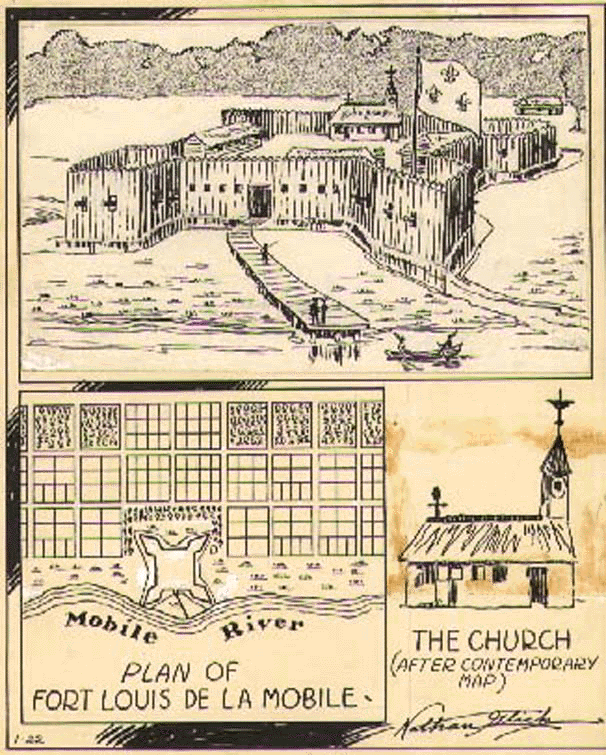
Fort Louis de la Mobile

In early 1702, a party of French adventurers led by Pierre Le Moyne d'Iberville moved from Fort Maurepas in Biloxi, Mississippi to a wooded bluff on the west bank of the Mobile River. There they founded Mobile, which they named after the Maubilian Nation. The outpost was populated by French soldiers, French-Canadian trappers and fur traders, and a few merchants and artisans accompanied by their families. There the French had easy access to the Indigenous fur trade, and furs were Mobile's primary economic resource throughout its early history. Along with fur, some settlers also raised cattle and harvested timber for shipbuilding and the production of naval stores.

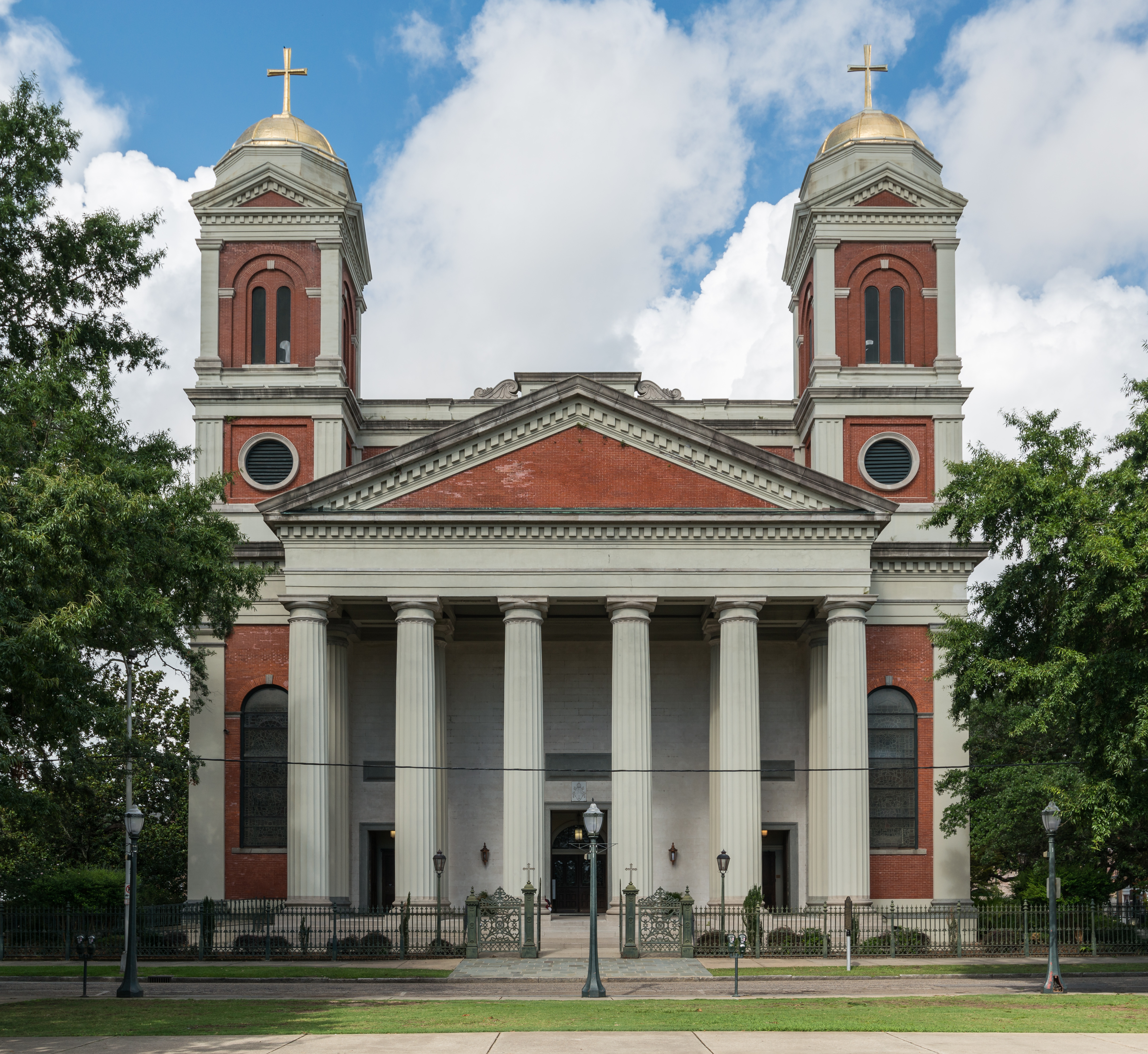
The Cathedral of the Immaculate Conception in Mobile, Alabama

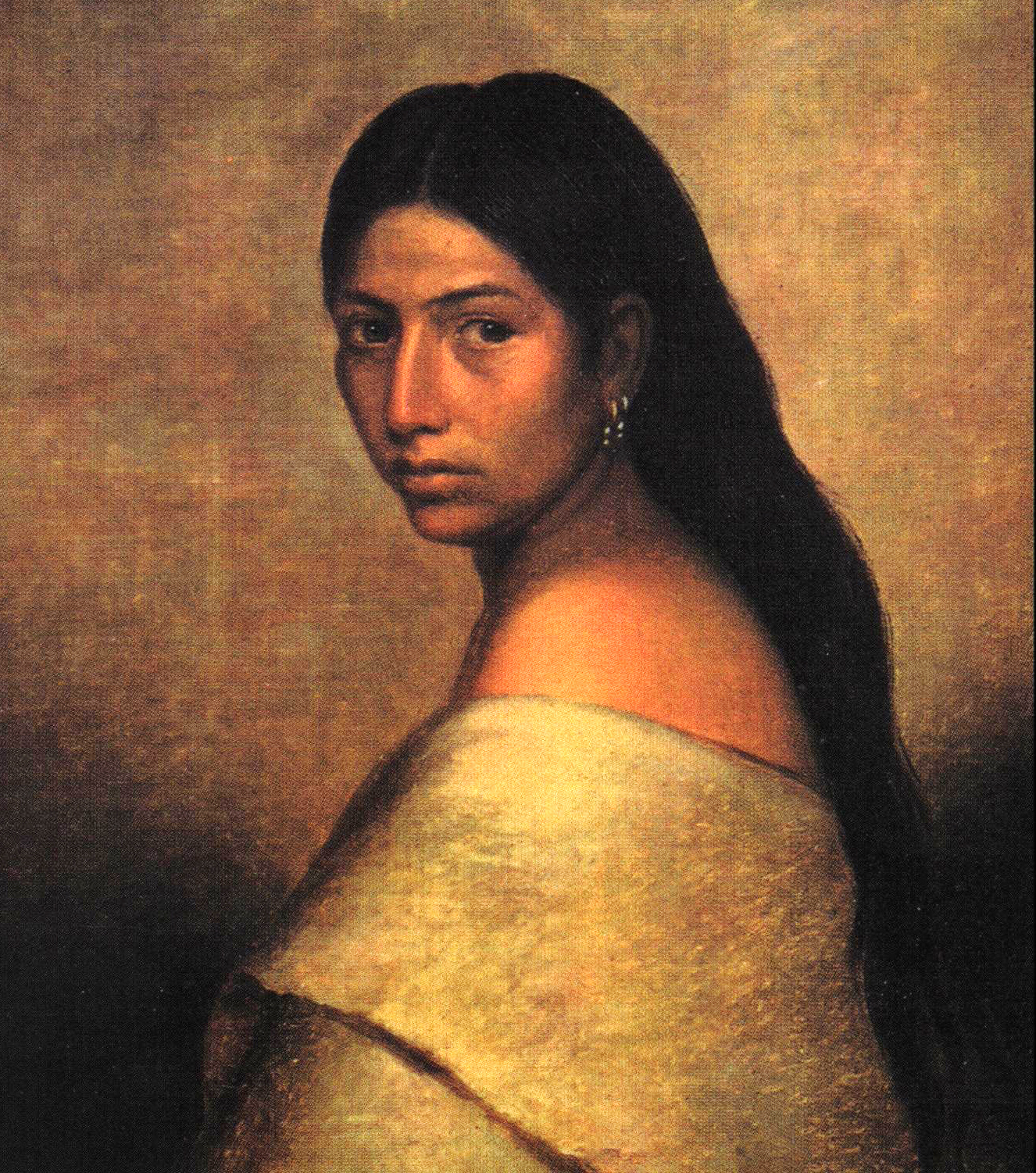
Portrait of a Choctaw Woman from Mobile

Indigenous nations gathered annually at Mobile to be received by the French, who offered them food, drink, and presents. During this time, as many as 2,000 Mobila would visit and could stay for as long as two weeks. Because of the close and friendly relationship between colonial French and Indigenous peoples, French colonists learned the Indigenous Lingua franca of the area, the Mobilian Jargon, and intermarried with Indigenous women.

In the 18th century, Mobile was a frontier on which a diverse array of peoples interacted: continental Frenchmen, French-Canadians, and various Indigenous peoples all mingled. Unusual in the context of early American history, the greatest source of division between these groups and the one that most often resulted in violent conflict was not that which existed between the Europeans and the natives, as was most often in the English settlement, but amongst the Europeans themselves. The differences between continental Frenchmen and French-Canadians were so great that serious disputes occurred between the two groups.

By the end of the 17th century, the French had begun to import African slaves into their mainland American colonies. In 1721, the first slaves arrived in Mobile, introducing elements of African and West Indian French Creole culture, as many of the slaves who came to Mobile worked in the French West Indies. In 1724, the Code Noir, a slave code based on ancient Roman laws, was instituted in French colonies which allowed slaves a degree of legal and religious rights not found in those of either the British colonies or the United States. Under the Code Noir, affranchis (ex-slaves) were entitled to full citizenship and complete civil equality with other French subjects.

By the mid-18th century, Mobile was populated by West Indian French Creoles, European Frenchmen, French-Canadians, Africans, and Indigenous people. Nevertheless, the practice of Roman Catholicism was widespread and largely transcended racial, ethnic, economic, and cultural boundaries. The town's inhabitants included a garrison of 50 soldiers and a mixed population of approximately 400 civilians including merchants, laborers, fur traders, artisans, and slaves. The descendants of this diverse group of people are called Creoles.

=== Mobile Alabama, the Athens of the South ===
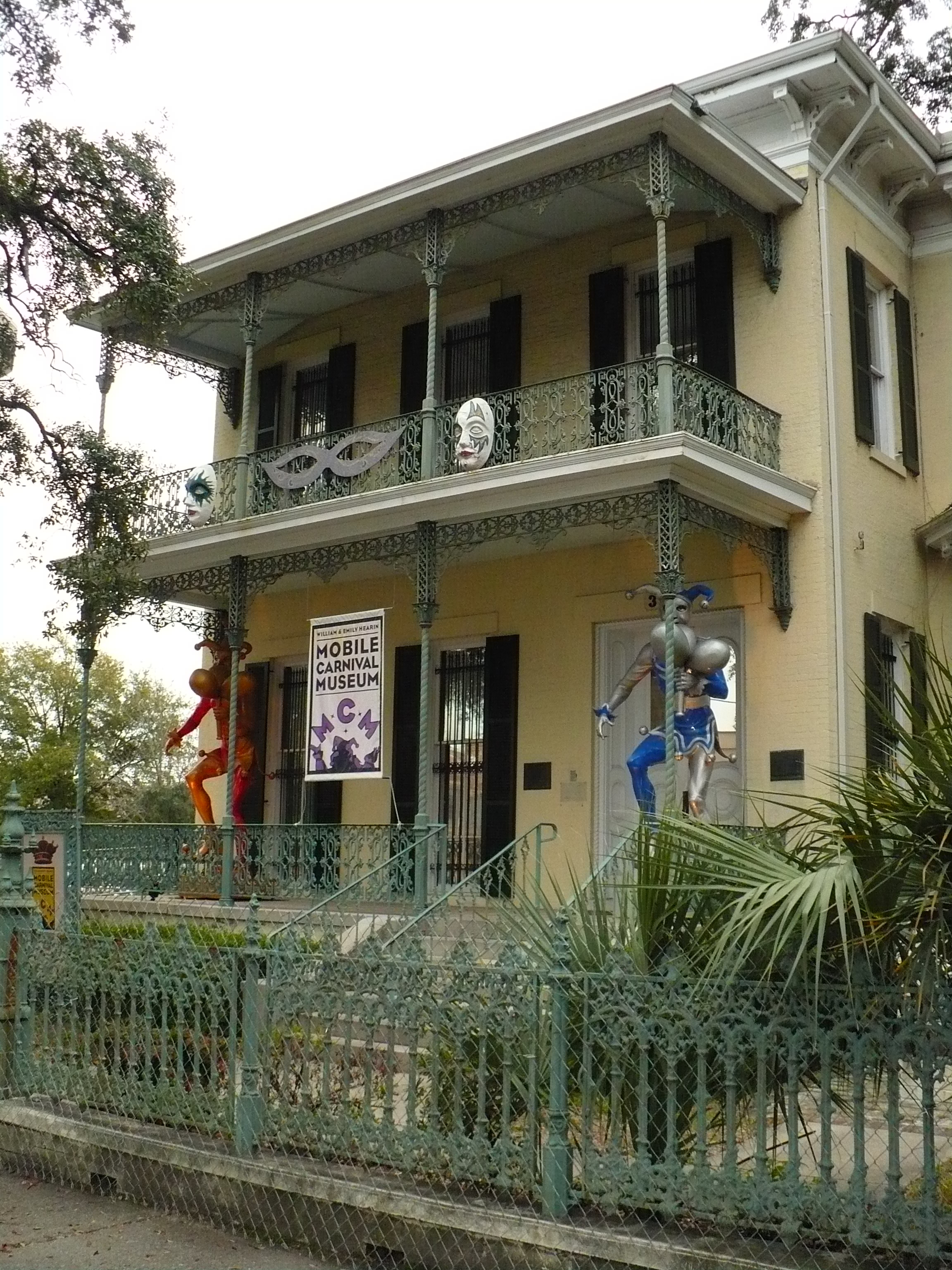
The Mobile Carnival Museum in Mobile, Alabama. Mardi Gras traditions began in Mobile.

Mobile contained approximately 40% of all of Alabama's free black population. Mobile's free people of color were known as the Creoles, a distinct group with it own schools, churches, fire company, and social organizations. Many Creoles were the descendants of free blacks at the time of Mobile's capture by American forces, and who retained their freedoms by treaty and treated by the American government as a unique people. Other Creoles were blood relatives of white Mobilians including those of prominent families.

In the mid-19th century Mobile grew prosperous. This is reflected in the nickname it would acquired around this time: "the Athens of the South." Immigrants from continental Europe and elsewhere in the United States arrived in growing number. By 1860, Mobile's population had grown to 30,000.

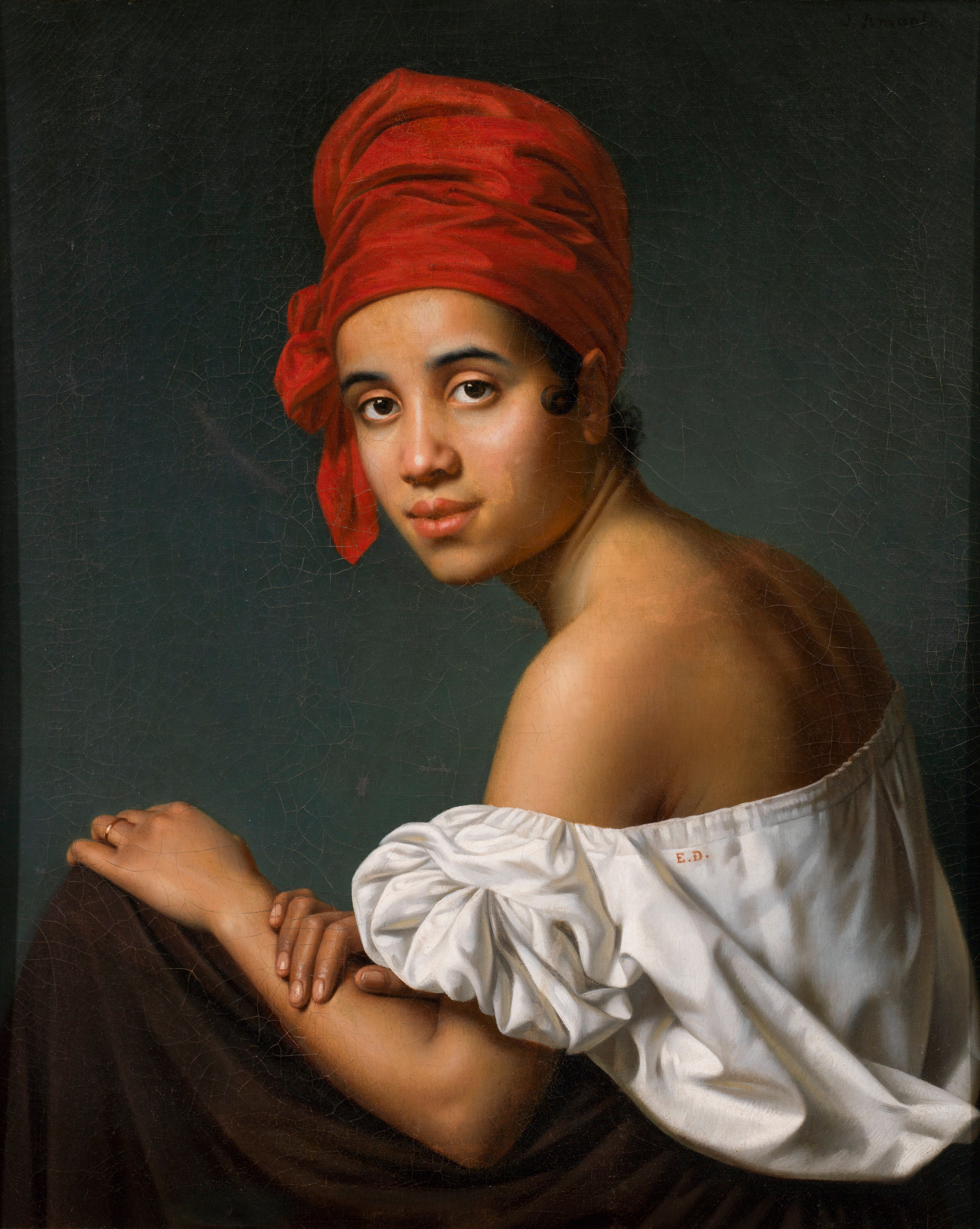
Jacques Amans, Creole in a red headdress (c. 1840)

In 1844, a Northern visitor described the city of Mobile as such:

"...clerks of all shapes and sizes, white and red haired men, staid thinking men and brainless flops. Here goes a staid, demeure-faced priest and behind him is a dashing gambler ... Here is a sailor just on shore with a pocket full of rocks ready for devilment of any kind and there is a beggar in rags. Pretty Creoles, pale-faced sewing girls, painted vice, big-headed and little-headed men, tall anatomies and short Falstaffs... a great country this is and make no mistake."

Mobile was known for its society life. The town was home to a number of social clubs, gentlemen's clubs, militia units, and other organizations that sponsored balls. A January 8 ball to commemorate the Battle of New Orleans was among the highlights of the social season, as were Cotillion balls staged by private clubs.

Spectating and betting on horse races was an especially common pastime in 19th -entury Mobile and popular across all social class of society. The Mobile Jockey Club offered Mobilians the ability to place a bet on their favorite steeds. Cockfighting also became popular during the 1840s and 1850s.

Like New Orleans, Mobile was home to the theater industry. Black people attended Mobile's theaters, and Mobilians were able to experience various plays and works by Shakespeare, contemporary comedies, and farce shows.

Mardi Gras became of great importance as mystic societies began putting on masked parades with bands, floats, and horses after members attended grand balls. Elaborate floats depicted images of the ancient world. In 1841 Cowbellion's floats of Greek gods were described as "one of the most gorgeous and unique spectacles that was ever beheld in modern times."

The Catholic community of primarily French Creole descent remained numerous and influential. In 1825, the Catholic community began the 15-year construction of the Cathedral of the Immaculate Conception. For most of the antebellum era, friction between Protestants and Catholics was practically non-existent.

The Creoles of Mobile built a Catholic school run by and for Creoles. Mobilians supported several literary societies, numerous book stores, and number of book and music publishers.

== Arkansas Creoles ==
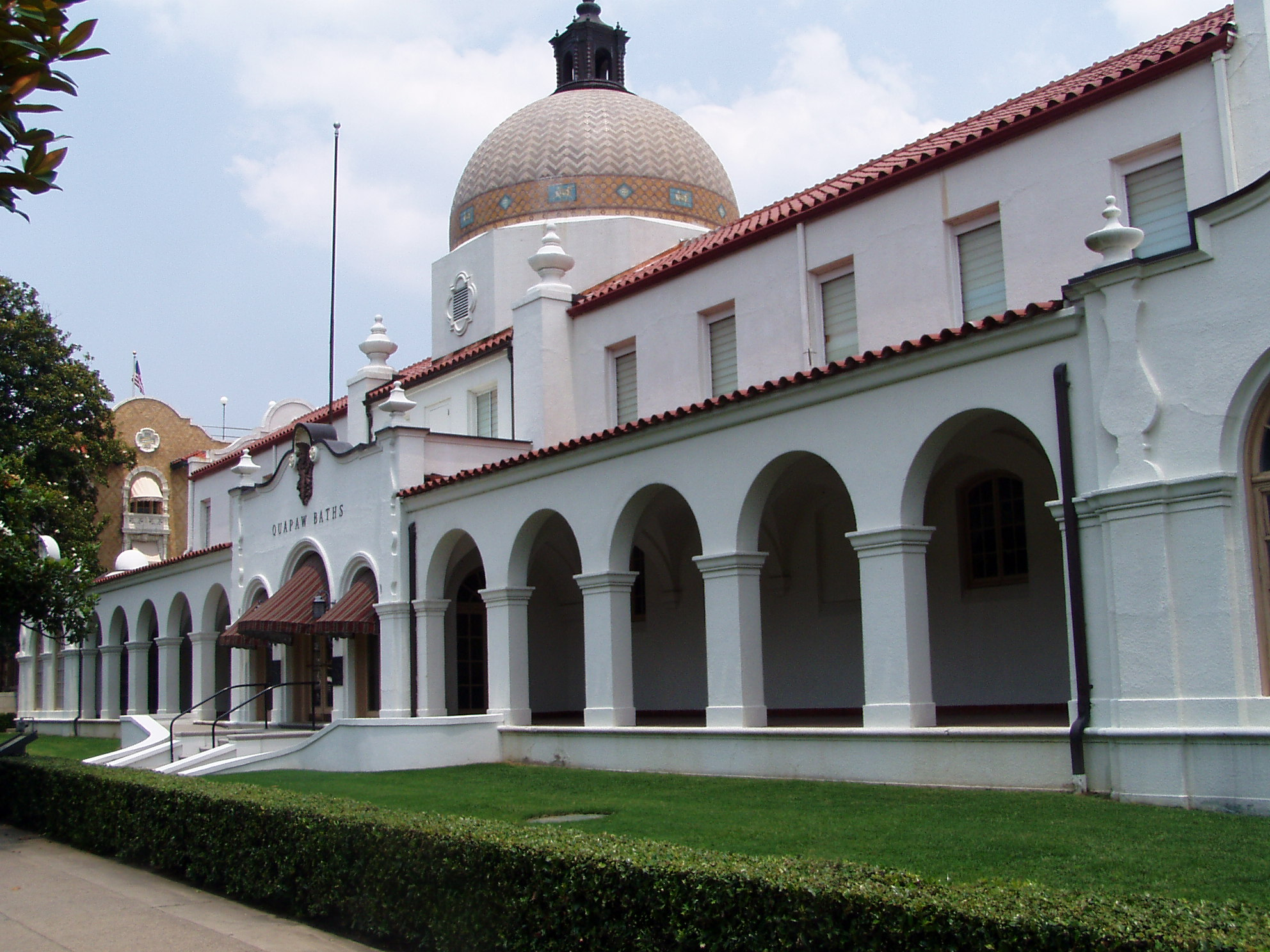
The Quapaw Bathhouse, State of Arkansas.

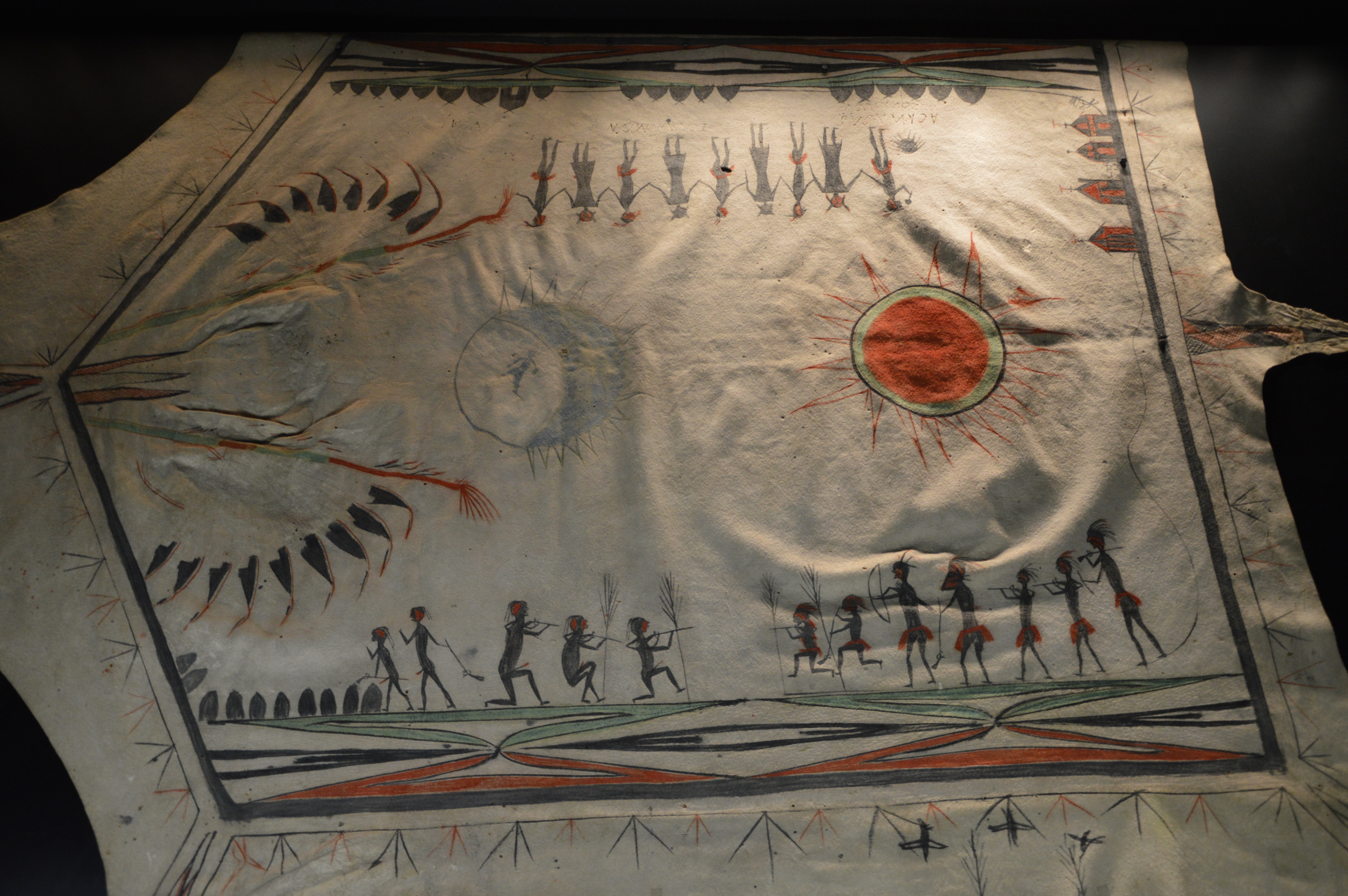
Quapaw "Three Villages" Robe, Arkansas, 18th century. Musée du quai Branly

The Quapaw reached their historical territory, the area of the confluence of the Arkansas and Mississippi rivers, at least by the mid-17th century. The Illinois and other Algonquian-speaking peoples to the northeast referred to these people as the Akansea or Akansa, referring to geography and meaning "land of the downriver people". As French explorers Jacques Marquette and Louis Jolliet encountered and interacted with the Illinois before they did the Quapaw, they adopted this exonym for the more westerly people. In their language, they referred to them as Arcansas. English-speaking settlers who arrived later in the region adopted the name used by the French, and adapted it to English spelling conventions.

The Arkansas Post (French: Poste de Arkansea; Spanish: Puesto de Arkansas), officially the Arkansas Post National Memorial, was the first European settlement located along the Mississippi River, in the Mississippi Alluvial Plain, and in the present-day U.S. state of Arkansas. In 1686, Henri de Tonti established it on behalf of Louis XIV of France for the purpose of trading with the Quapaw Nation.

During the fur trade years, Arkansas Post was protected by a series of fortifications. The forts and associated settlements were located at four known sites and possibly a fifth.

The French, Spanish, and Americans, who acquired the territory in 1803 with the Louisiana Purchase, considered the site of strategic value. It was the capital of Arkansas from 1819 until 1821 when the territorial government relocated to Little Rock.

Écore Fabre (Fabre's Bluff) was started as a trading post by the Frenchman Fabre and was one of the first European settlements in south-central Arkansas. While the area was nominally ruled by the Spanish from 1763 to 1789, following French defeat in the Seven Years' War, they did not have many colonists in the area and did not interfere with the French. The United States acquired the Louisiana Purchase in 1803, which stimulated migration of English-speaking settlers to this area. They renamed Écore Fabre as Camden.

During years of colonial rule of New France, many of the ethnic French fur traders and voyageurs had an amicable relationship with the Quapaw, as they did with many other trading tribes. Many Quapaw women and French men married and had families together, creating a métis (mixed French and Indigenous) population, which was part of the larger population of Arkansas Creoles. Pine Bluff, Arkansas, for example, was founded by Joseph Bonne, a man of mixed Quapaw-French ancestry.

== Indiana French ==
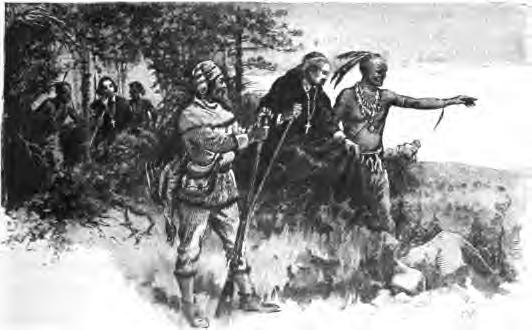
Native Americans guide French explorers through Indiana, as depicted by Maurice Thompson in Stories of Indiana.

In 1679, French explorer René-Robert Cavelier, Sieur de La Salle was the first European to cross into Indiana after reaching present-day South Bend at the St. Joseph River. He returned the following year to learn about the region. French-Canadian fur traders soon arrived, bringing blankets, jewelry, tools, whiskey and weapons to trade for skins with the Native Americans.

By 1702, Sieur Juchereau established the first trading post near Vincennes. In 1715, Sieur de Vincennes built Fort Miami at Kekionga, now Fort Wayne. In 1717, another Canadian, Picote de Beletre, built Fort Ouiatenon on the Wabash River, to try to control Native American trade routes from Lake Erie to the Mississippi River.

In 1732, Sieur de Vincennes built a second fur trading post at Vincennes. French settlers, who had left the earlier post because of hostilities, returned in larger numbers. In a period of a few years, British colonists arrived from the East and contended against the French for control of the lucrative fur trade. Fighting between the French and British colonists occurred throughout the 1750s as a result.

The Native American tribes of Indiana sided with New France during the French and Indian War (also known as the Seven Years' War). With Britain's victory in 1763, the French were forced to cede to the British crown all their lands in North America east of the Mississippi River and north and west of the colonies.

== Louisiana Creoles ==
=== Lower Louisiana ===
Map of North America in 1750, before the French and Indian War (part of the international Seven Years' War (1756 to 1763)). Possessions of Britain (pink), France (blue), and Spain (orange).

Through both the French and Spanish (late 18th century) regimes, parochial and colonial governments used the term Creole for ethnic French and Spanish people born in the New World as opposed to Europe. Parisian French was the predominant language among colonists in early New Orleans.

Later the regional French evolved to contain local phrases and slang terms. The French Creoles spoke what became known as Colonial French. Because of isolation, the language in the colony developed differently from that in France. It was spoken by the ethnic French and Spanish and their Creole descendants.

The commonly accepted definition of Louisiana Creole today is a person descended from ancestors in Louisiana before the Louisiana Purchase by the United States in 1803. An estimated 7,000 European immigrants settled in Louisiana during the 18th century, one percent of the number of European colonists in the Thirteen Colonies along the Atlantic coast. Louisiana attracted considerably fewer French colonists than did its West Indian colonies.

After the crossing of the Atlantic Ocean, which lasted more than two months, the colonists had numerous challenges ahead of them in the Louisiana frontier. Their living conditions were difficult: uprooted, they had to face a new, often hostile, environment, with difficult climate and tropical diseases. Many of these immigrants died during the maritime crossing or soon after their arrival.

Hurricanes, unknown in France, periodically struck the coast, destroying whole villages. The Mississippi Delta was plagued with periodic yellow fever epidemics. Europeans also brought the Eurasian diseases of malaria and cholera, which flourished along with mosquitoes and poor sanitation. These conditions slowed colonization. Moreover, French villages and forts were not always sufficient to protect from enemy offensives. Attacks by Native Americans represented a real threat to the groups of isolated colonists.

The Natchez massacred 250 colonists in Lower Louisiana in retaliation for encroachment by French settlers. The Natchez warriors took Fort Rosalie (now Natchez, Mississippi) by surprise, killing many settlers. During the next two years, the French attacked the Natchez in return, causing them to flee or, when captured, be deported as slaves to their Caribbean colony of Saint-Domingue (later Haiti).

In the colonial period of French and Spanish rule, men tended to marry later after becoming financially established. French settlers frequently took Native American women as their wives (see Marriage 'à la façon du pays'), and as slaves began to be imported into the colony, settlers also took African wives. Intermarriage between the different groups of Louisiana created a large multiracial Creole population.

==== Engagés and Casquette Girls ====
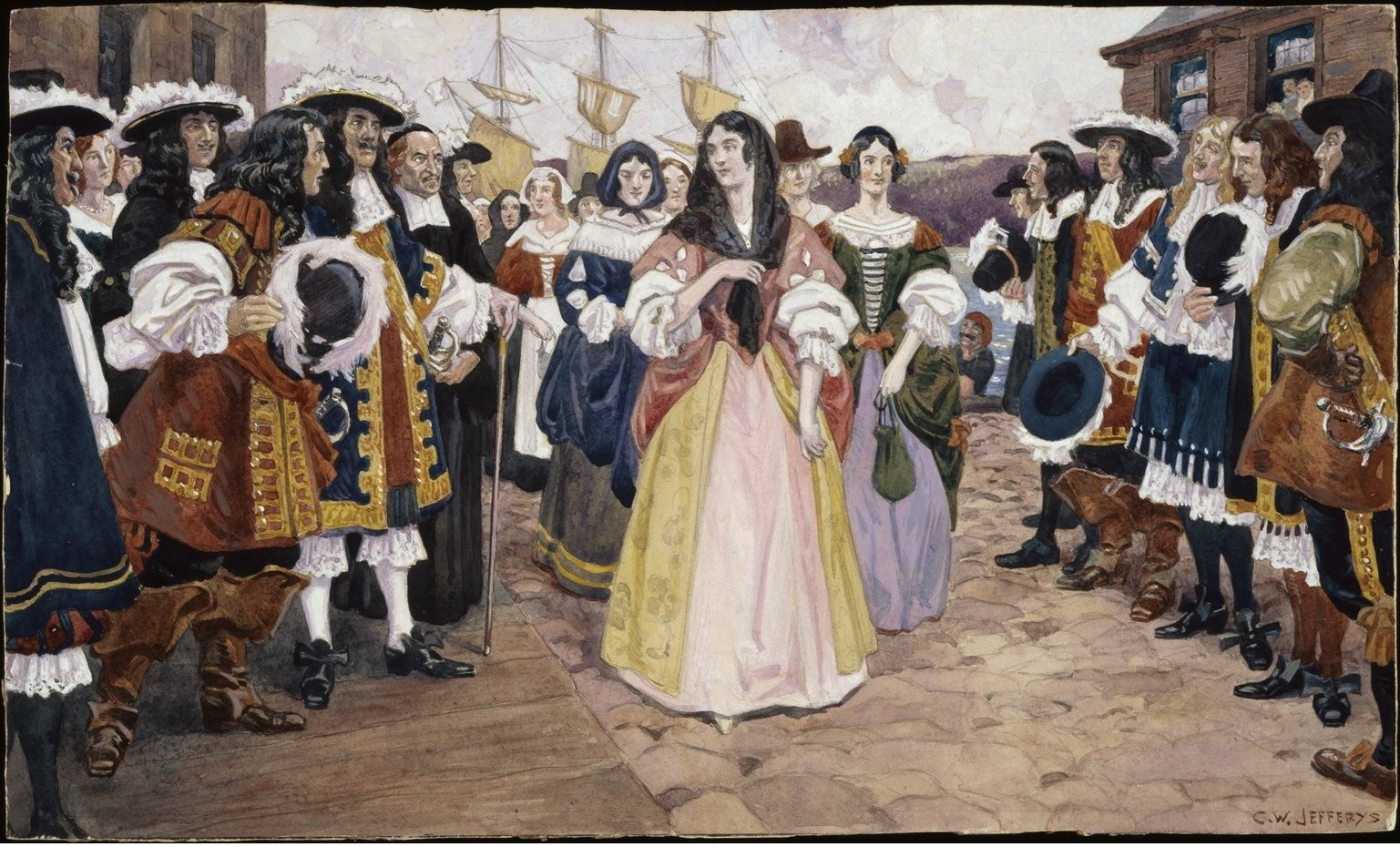
Casquette girls, or Filles du Roi were girls sent to New France as wives for colonists. In Louisiana, they became known as Pelican girls.

Aside from French government representatives and soldiers, colonists included mostly young men who were recruited in French ports or in Paris. Some labored as engagés (indentured servants), i.e. "temporary semi-slaves"; they were required to remain in Louisiana for a length of time, fixed by the contract of service, to pay back the cost of passage and board. Engagés in Louisiana generally worked for seven years, and their masters provided them housing, food, and clothing. They were often housed in barns and performed hard labor.

Starting in 1698, French merchants were obliged to transport a number of men to the colonies in proportion to the ships' tonnage. Some of the men brought over were engaged on three-year indenture contracts under which the contract-holder would be responsible for their "vital needs" as well as provide a salary at the end of the contract term. Under John Law's Company, efforts to increase the use of engagés in the colony were made, notably including German settlers whose contracts were absolved when the company went bankrupt in 1731.

During this time, to increase the colonial population, the government also recruited young Frenchwomen, known as filles à la cassette (in English, casket girls, referring to the casket or case of belongings they brought with them) to go to the colony to be wed to colonial soldiers. The king financed dowries for each girl. (This practice was similar to events in 17th-century Quebec: about 800 filles du roi (daughters of the king) were recruited to immigrate to New France under the monetary sponsorship of Louis XIV.)

In addition, French authorities deported some female criminals to the colony. For example, in 1721, the ship La Baleine brought close to 90 women of childbearing age from the prison of La Salpêtrière in Paris to Louisiana. Most of the women quickly found husbands among the male residents of the colony. These women, many of whom were most likely prostitutes or felons, were known as The Baleine Brides. Such events inspired Manon Lescaut (1731), a novel written by the Abbé Prévost, which was later adapted as an opera in the 19th century.

Historian Joan Martin maintains that there is little documentation that casket girls (considered among the ancestors of French Creoles) were transported to Louisiana. (The Ursuline order of nuns, who were said to chaperone the girls until they married, have denied the casket girl myth as well.) Martin suggests this account was mythical. The system of plaçage that continued into the 19th century resulted in many young white men having women of color as partners and mothers of their children, often before or even after their marriages to white women. French Louisiana also included communities of Swiss and German settlers; however, royal authorities did not refer to "Louisianans" but described the colonial population as "French" citizens.

==== People of mixed French and Indigenous ancestry in Louisiana ====
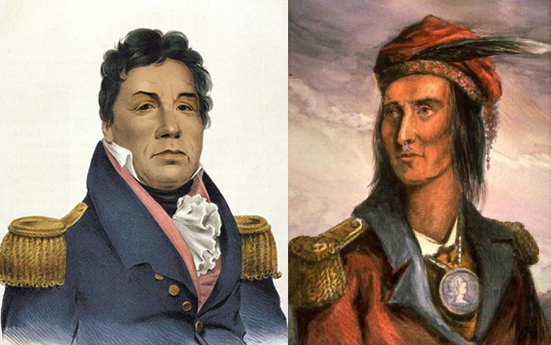
French Indian chieftains of Louisiana.

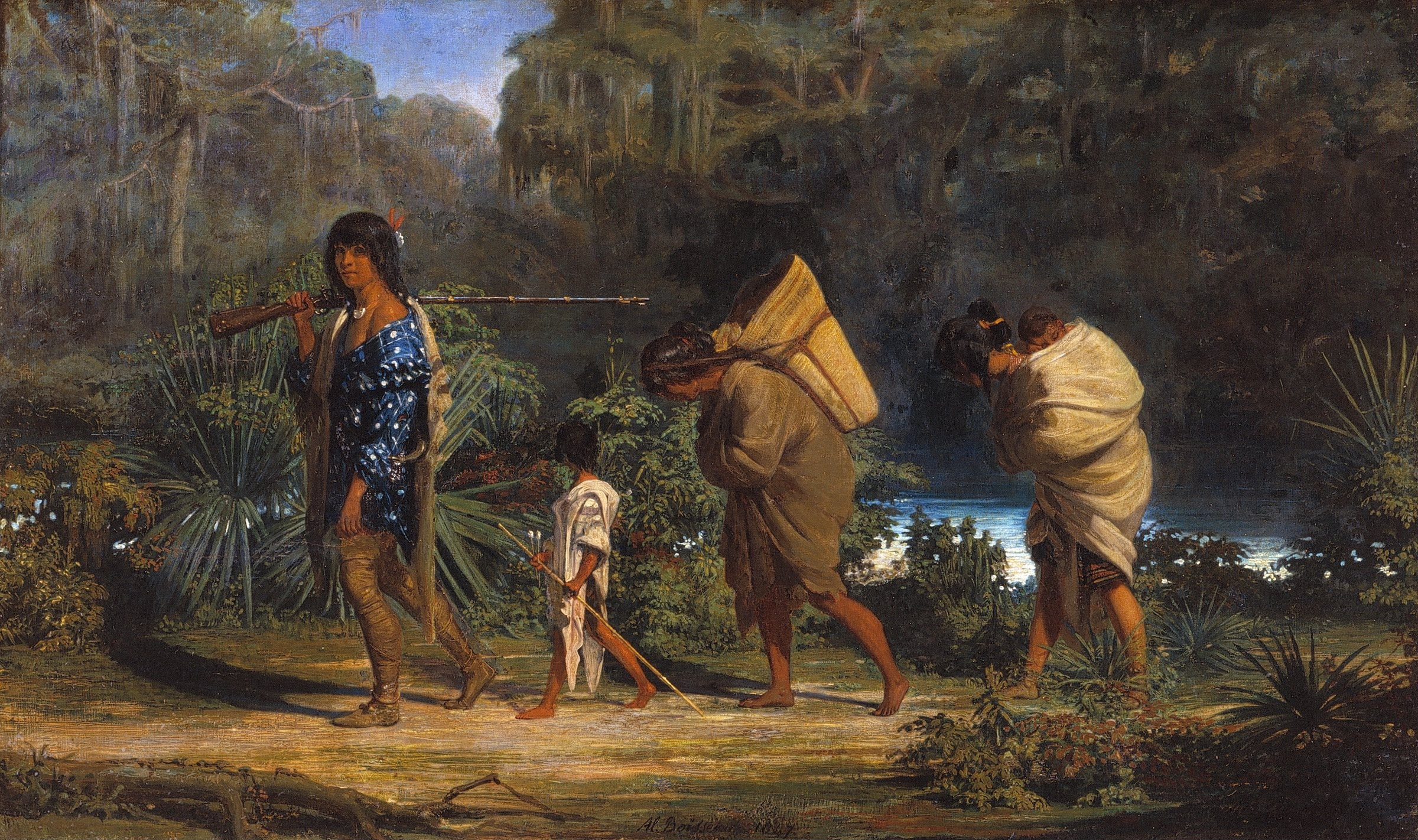
Louisiana Indians walking along a bayou (Alfred Boisseau, 1847)

New France wished to make Native Americans subjects of the king and good Christians, but the distance from Metropolitan France and the sparseness of French settlement prevented this. In official rhetoric, the Native Americans were regarded as subjects of the Viceroyalty of New France, but in reality, they were largely autonomous due to their numerical superiority. The local authorities of New France (governors, officers) did not have the human resources to establish French law and customs, and instead often compromised with the Indigenous people.

Indigenous nations offered essential support for the French: they ensured the survival of the New France's colonists, participated with them in the fur trade, and acted as guides in expeditions. The French alliance with Indigenous nations also provided mutual protection from hostile non-allied tribes and incursions on French and Indigenous peoples' land from enemy European powers. The French and Indigenous alliance proved invaluable during the later French and Indian War against the New England colonies in 1753.

The French & Indigenous peoples influenced each other in many fields: the French settlers learned the languages of the natives, such as Mobilian Jargon, a Choctaw-based Creole language that served as a trade language in use among the French and various Indigenous nations in the region. Indigenous people bought European goods (fabric, alcohol, firearms, etc.), learned French, and sometimes adopted their religion.

The coureurs des bois and soldiers borrowed canoes and moccasins. Many of them ate native food such as wild rice and various meats, like bear and dog. The colonists were often dependent on the Native Americans for food. Creole cuisine is the heir of these mutual influences: thus, sagamité, for example, is a mix of corn pulp, bear fat and bacon. Today jambalaya, a word of Seminole origin, refers to a multitude of recipes calling for meat and rice, all very spicy. Sometimes shamans succeeded in curing the colonists thanks to traditional remedies, such as the application of fir tree gum on wounds and Royal Fern on rattlesnake bites.

Many French colonists both admired and feared the military power of the Native Americans, though some governors from France scorned their culture and wanted to keep racial purity between the whites and Indigenous people. In 1735, interracial marriages without the approval of the authorities were prohibited in Louisiana. However, by the 1750s in New France, the idea of the Native Americans became one of the "Noble Savage," that Indigenous people were spiritually pure and played an important role in the natural purity of the New World. Native Americans did marry French settlers, with Indigenous women being consistently considered as good wives to foster trade and help create offspring. Their intermarriage created a large métis (mixed French and Indigenous) population in New France.

In spite of some disagreements (some Indigenous people killed farmers' pigs, which devastated corn fields), and sometimes violent confrontations (Fox Wars, Natchez uprisings, and expeditions against the Chicachas), the relationship with the Native Americans was relatively good in Louisiana. French imperialism was expressed through some wars and the slavery of some Native Americans. But most of the time, the relationship was based on dialogue and negotiation.

==== Africans in Louisiana ====
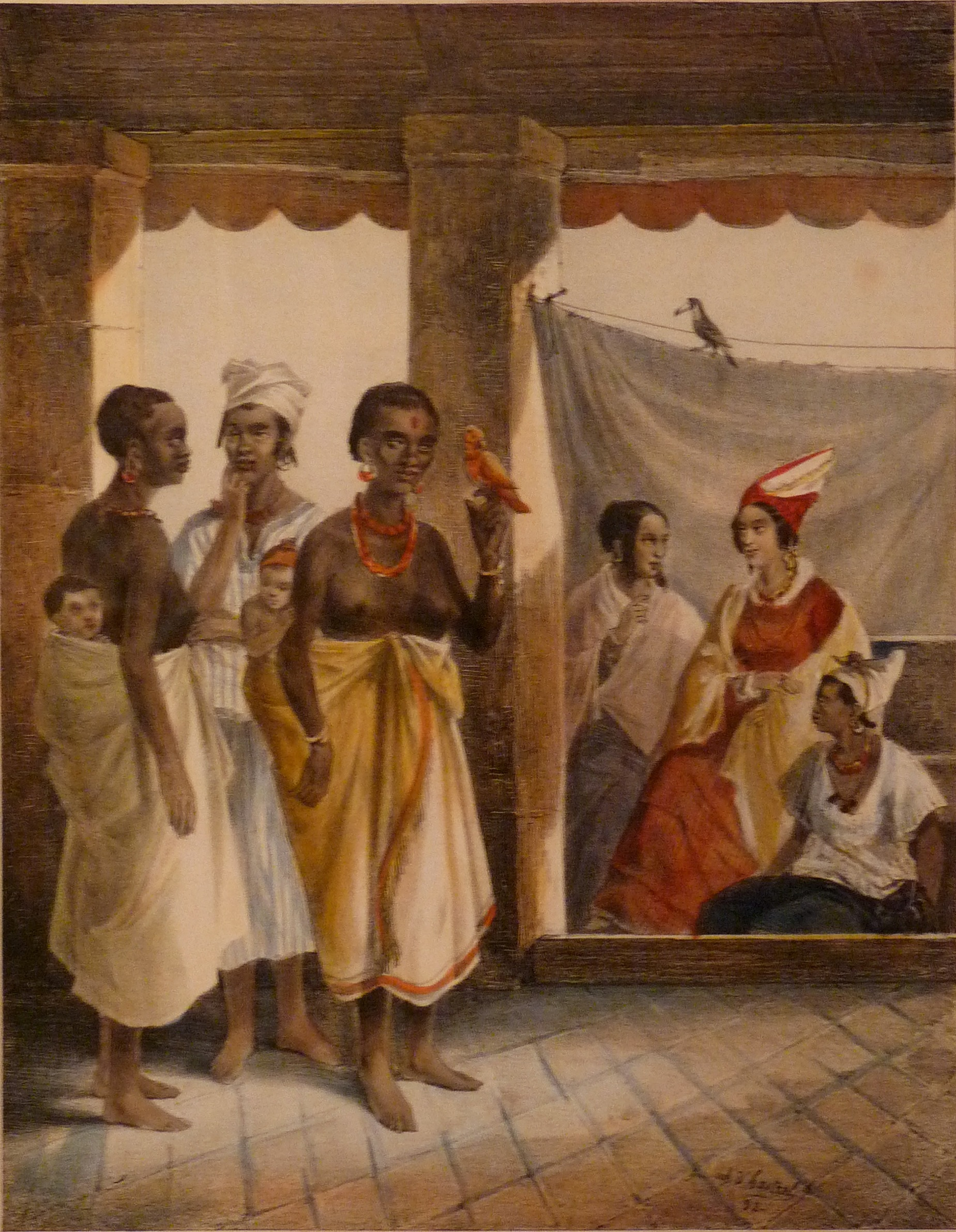
Africans contributed greatly to the creolization of Louisiana.

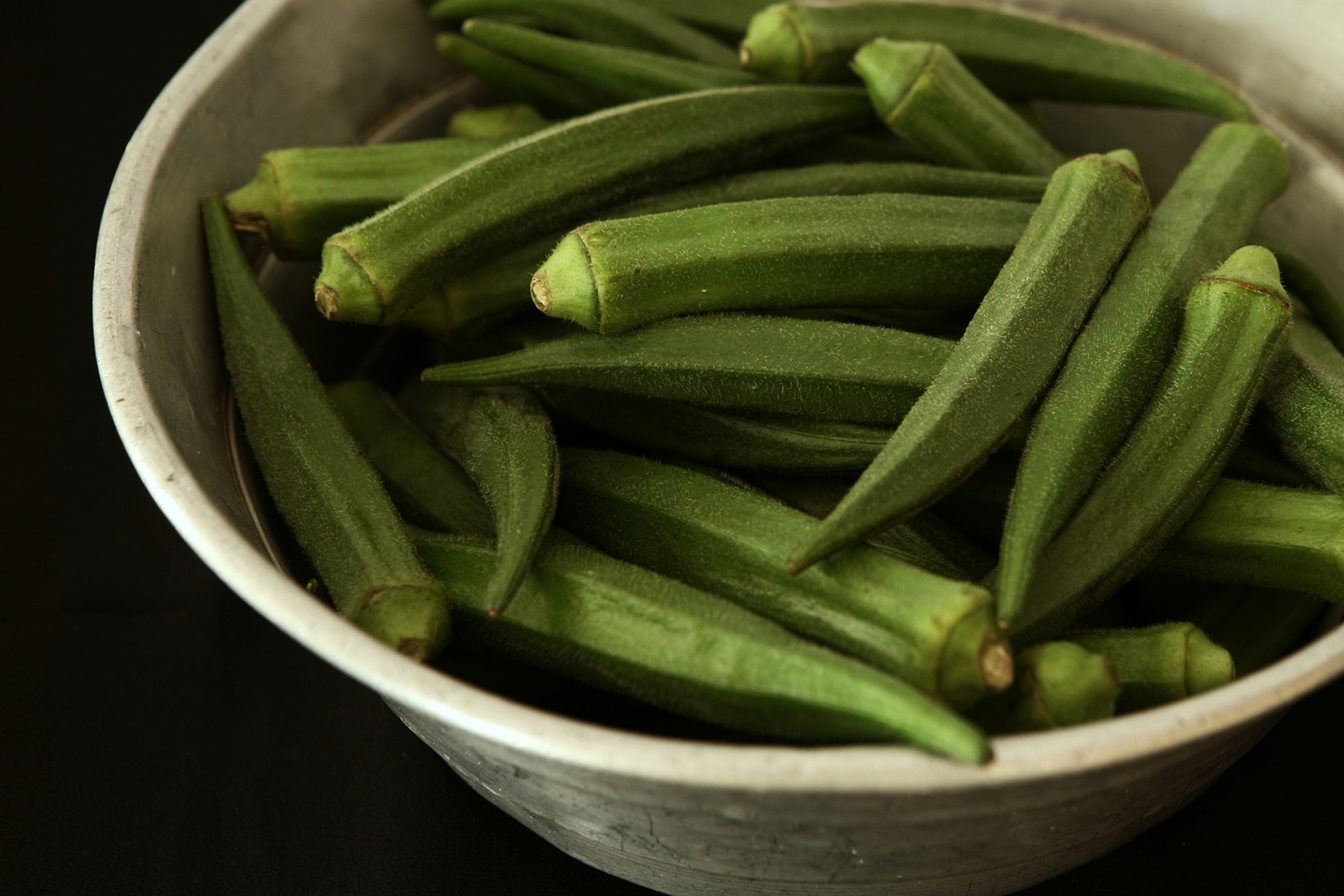
Africans brought okra to Louisiana.

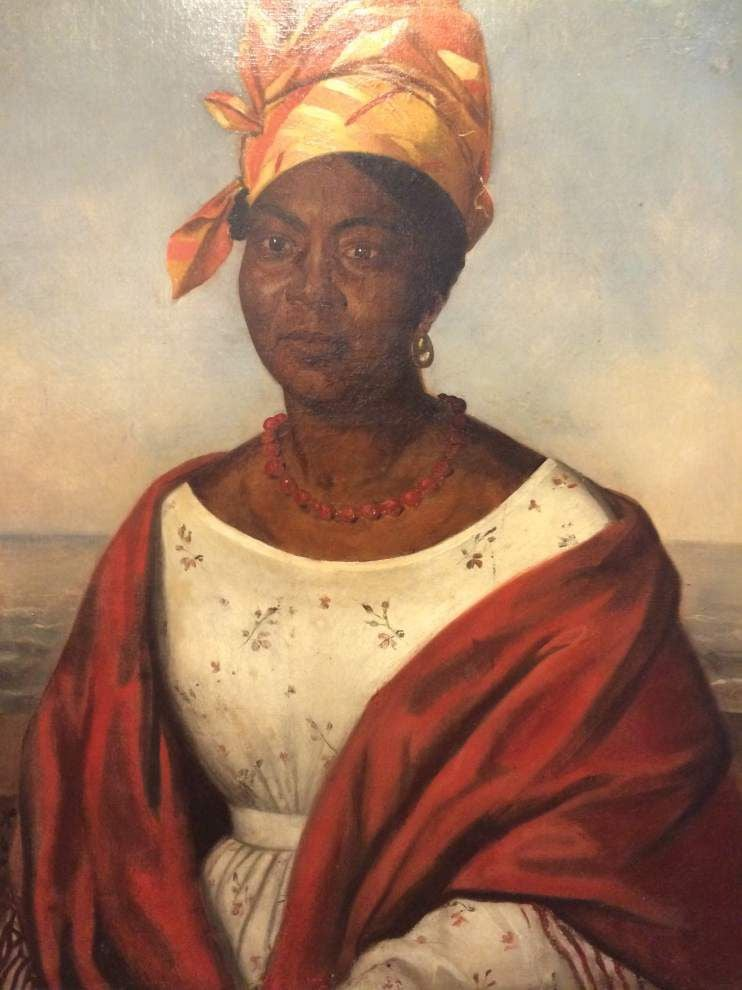
New Orleans Creole lady wearing a traditional tignon.

Inability to find labor was the most pressing issue in Louisiana. In 1717, John Law, the French Comptroller General of Finances, decided to import African slaves into Louisiana. His objective was to develop the plantation economy of Lower Louisiana. John Law's Company held a monopoly over the slave trade in the area. The colonists turned to sub-Saharan African slaves to make their investments in Louisiana profitable. In the late 1710s the transatlantic slave trade imported slaves into the colony. This led to the biggest shipment in 1716 where several trading ships appeared with slaves as cargo to the local residents in a one-year span.

Between 1723 and 1769, most slaves imported to Louisiana were from modern day Senegal, Mali and Congo. A large number of the imported slaves from the Senegambia region were members of the Wolof and Bambara ethnic groups. During the Spanish control of Louisiana, between 1770 and 1803, most of the slaves still came from the Congo and the Senegambia region but they also imported more slaves from modern-day Benin. Other ethnic groups imported during this period included members of the Nago people, a Yoruba subgroup.

In Louisiana, the term Bambara was used as a generic term for African slaves. European traders used Bambara as a term for defining vaguely a region of ethnic origin. Muslim traders and interpreters often used Bambara to indicate Non-Muslim captives. Slave traders would sometimes identify their slaves as Bambara in hopes of securing a higher price, as Bambara slaves were sometimes characterized as being more passive. Further confusing the name's indication of ethnic, linguistic, religious, or other implications, the concurrent Bambara Empire had notoriety for its practice of slave-capturing wherein Bambara soldiers would raid neighbors and capture the young men of other ethnic groups, forcibly assimilate them, and turn them into slave soldiers known as Ton. The Bambara Empire depended on war-captives to replenish and increase its numbers; many of the people who called themselves Bambara were indeed not ethnic Bambara.

Africans contributed to the creolization of Louisiana society. They brought okra from Africa, a plant common in the preparation of gumbo. While the Code Noir required that the slaves receive a Christian education, many practiced animism and often combined elements of the two faiths. The Code Noir also conferred affranchis (ex-slaves) full citizenship and gave complete civil equality with other French subjects.

Louisiana slave society generated its own distinct Afro-Creole culture that was present in religious beliefs and the Louisiana Creole language. The slaves brought with them their cultural practices, languages, and religious beliefs rooted in spirit and ancestor worship, as well as Roman Catholic Christianity—all of which were key elements of Louisiana Voodoo. In addition, in the early nineteenth century, many Saint-Domingue Creoles also settled in Louisiana, both free people of color and slaves, following the Haitian Revolution, contributing to the Voodoo tradition of the state. During the American period (1804–1820), almost half of the slaves came from the Congo.

==== Cajuns in Louisiana ====
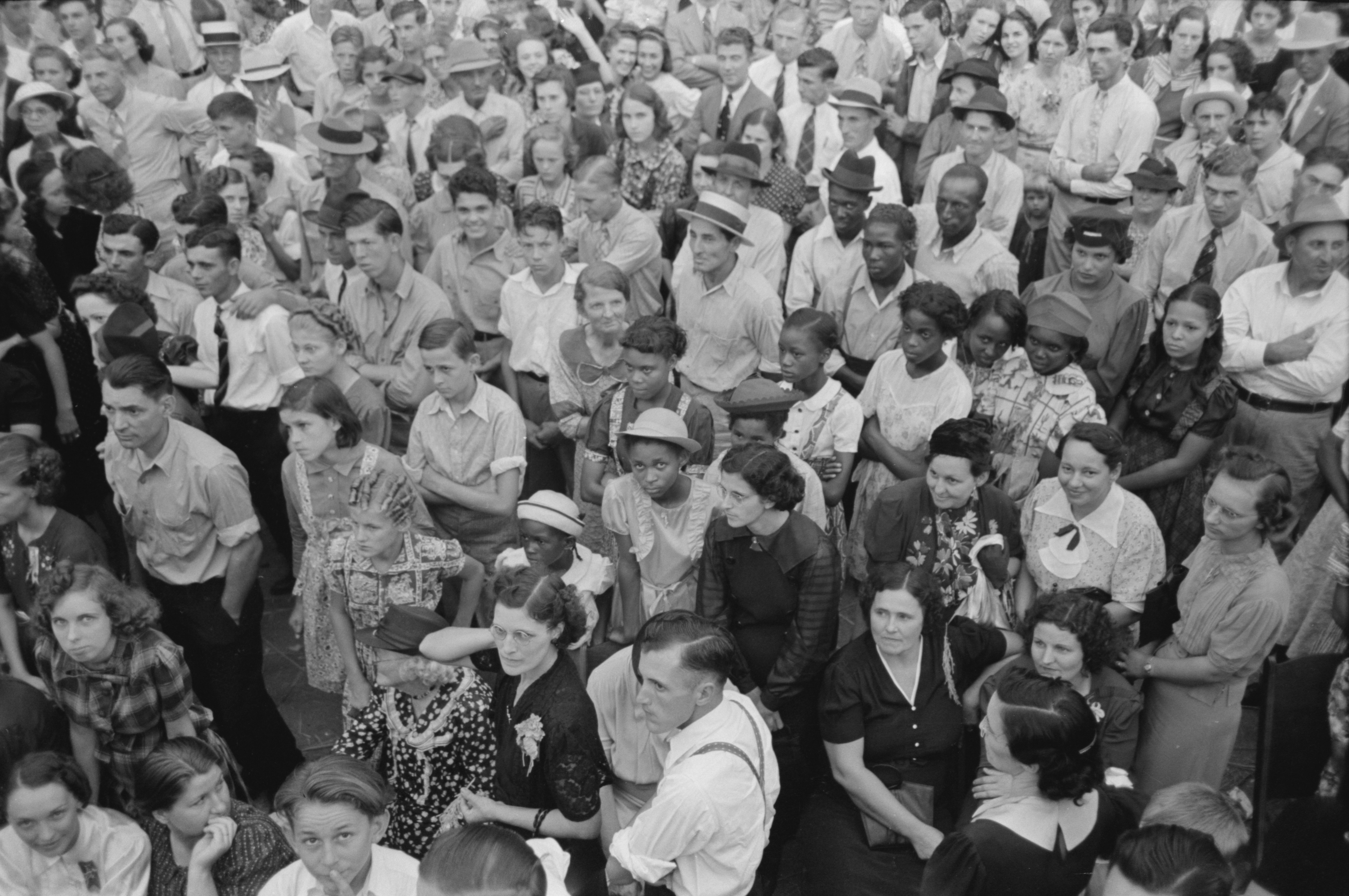
The Cajun-Creole population of Crowley enjoying a Cajun Music Concert in 1938.

A map of Acadiana, the Cajun Country.

In 1765, during Spanish rule, several thousand Acadians from the French colony of Acadia (now Nova Scotia, New Brunswick, and Prince Edward Island) made their way to Louisiana after having been expelled from Acadia by British authorities after the French and Indian War. They settled chiefly in the southwestern Louisiana region now called Acadiana. The governor Luis de Unzaga y Amézaga, eager to gain more settlers, welcomed the Acadians, who became the ancestors of Louisiana's Cajuns.

===== Americanization of the Cajun Country =====
When the United States of America began assimilating and Americanizing the parishes of the Cajun Country between the 1950s and 1970s, they imposed segregation and reorganized the inhabitants of the Cajun Country to identify racially as either "white" Cajuns or "black" Creoles. As the younger generations were made to abandon speaking French and French customs, the White or mixed Indigenous and Cajun people assimilated into the Anglo-American host culture, and the Black Cajuns assimilated into the African American culture.

Cajuns looked to the Civil Rights Movement and other Black liberation and empowerment movements as a guide to fostering Louisiana's French cultural renaissance. A Cajun student protester in 1968 declared "We're slaves to a system. Throw away the shackles... and be free with your brother."

==== Refugees from Saint-Domingue in Louisiana ====
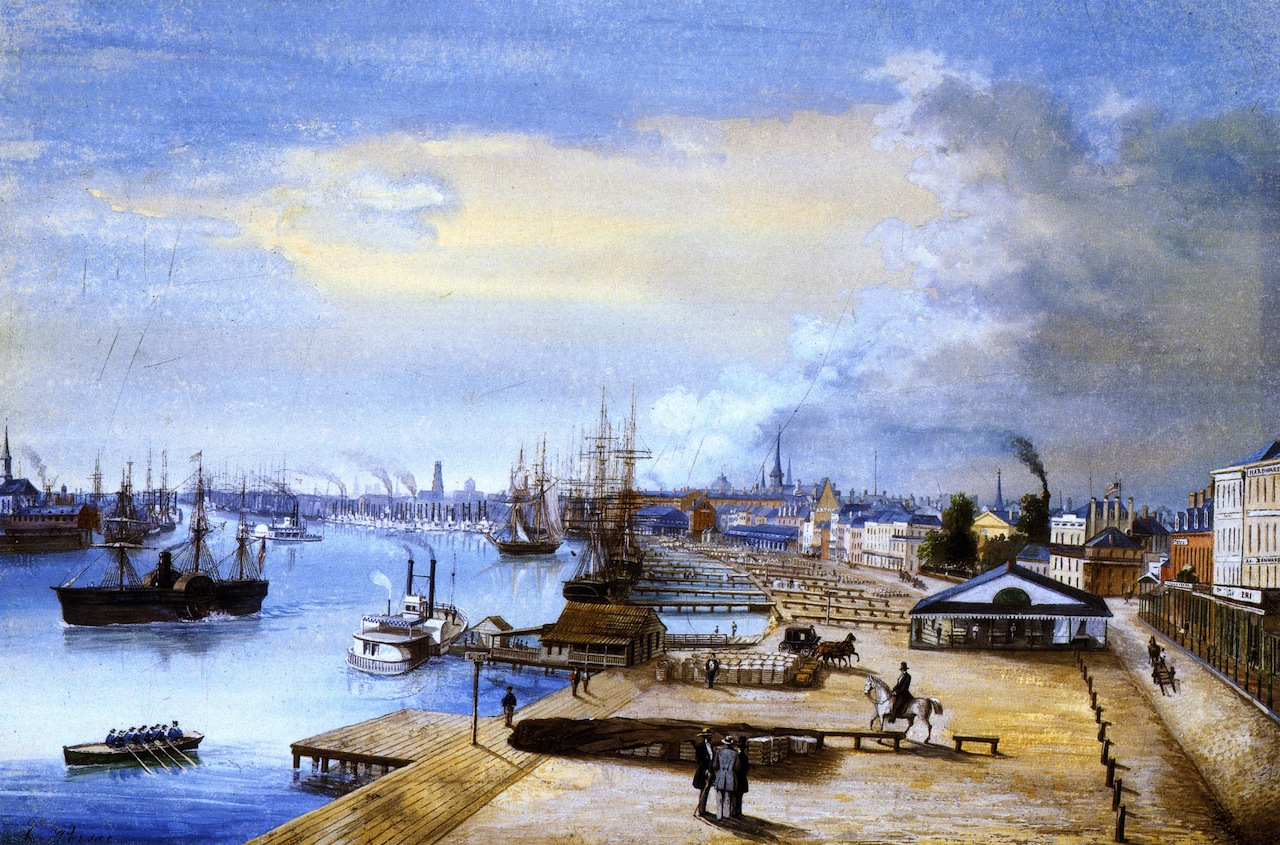
New Orleans, the metropolis of the Creole State

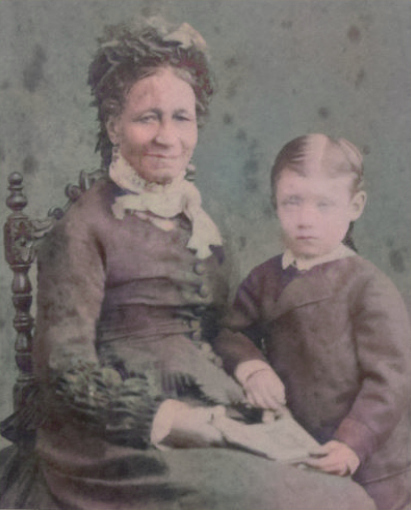
Saint-Domingue Creole Elisabeth Dieudonné Vincent with her granddaughter. Vincent fled to New Orleans, Louisiana with her parents as a child.

The flag of New Orleans, Louisiana

In the early 19th century, floods of Creole refugees fled Saint-Domingue and poured into New Orleans, nearly tripling the city's population. Indeed, more than half of the refugee population of Saint-Domingue settled in Louisiana. Thousands of refugees, both white and Creole of color, arrived in New Orleans, sometimes bringing slaves with them. While Governor Claiborne and other Anglo-American officials wanted to keep out additional free black men, Louisiana Creoles wanted to increase the French-speaking Creole population. As more refugees were allowed in Louisiana, those who had first gone to Cuba had also arrived. Officials in Cuba deported many of these refugees in retaliation for Bonapartist schemes in Spain.

Nearly 90 percent of early 19th century immigrants to the territory settled in New Orleans. The 1809 deportation from Cuba brought 2,731 whites, 3,102 Creoles of color and 3,226 slaves, which, in total, doubled the city's population. The city became 63 percent black in population, a greater proportion than Charleston, South Carolina's 53 percent.

The Saint-Domingue Creole specialized population raised Louisiana's level of culture and industry, and was one of the reasons why Louisiana was able to gain statehood so quickly. A quote from a Louisiana Creole who remarked on the rapid development of his homeland:

"Nobody knows better than you just how little education the Louisianians of my generation have received and how little opportunity one had twenty years ago to procure teachers... Louisiana today offers almost as many resources as any other state in the American Union for the education of its youth. The misfortunes of the French Revolution have cast upon this country so many talented men. This factor has also produced a considerable increase in the population and wealth. The evacuation of Saint-Domingue and lately that of the island of Cuba, coupled with the immigration of the people from the East Coast, have tripled in eight years the population of this rich colony, which has been elevated to the status of statehood by virtue of a governmental decree."

==== Louisiana Creole Exceptionalism ====
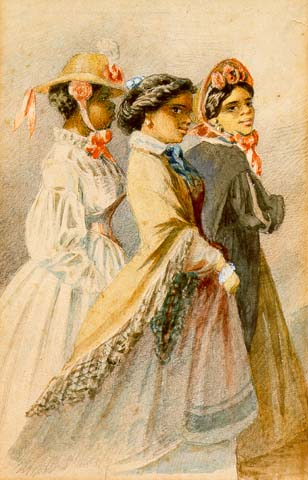
Bourgeois Louisiana Creole girls.

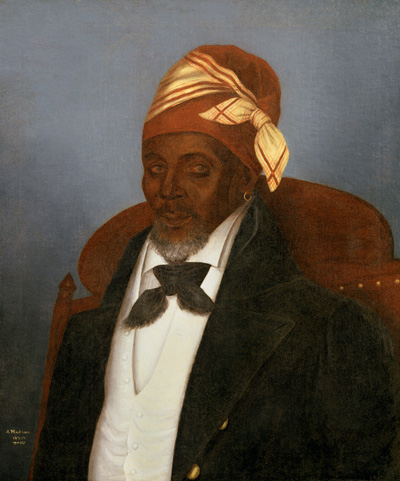
A Creole gentleman of New Orleans with an exquisite Creole turban.

Louisiana's development and growth was rapid after its admission as a member state of the American Union.

By 1850, 1/3 of all Creoles of color owned over $100,000 worth of property. Creoles of color were wealthy businessmen, entrepreneurs, clothiers, real estate developers, doctors, and other respected professions; they owned estates and properties in French Louisiana. Aristocratic Creoles of Color were very wealthy, such as Aristide Mary who owned more than $1,500,000 of property in the State of Louisiana.

Nearly all boys of wealthy Creole families were sent to France where they received an excellent classical education.

Being a French, and later Spanish colony, Louisiana maintained a three-tiered society that was very similar to other Latin American and Caribbean countries, with the three tiers: aristocracy (grands habitants), bourgeoisie, and peasantry (petits habitants). The blending of cultures and races created a society unlike any other in America.

== Minnesota French ==
The history of the French language in Minnesota is closely linked with that of Canadian settlers, such as explorer Louis Hennepin and trapper Pierre Parrant, who contributed very early on to its use in the area.

As early as the mid-17th century, evidence shows the presence of French expeditions, settlements and villages in the region, in particular thanks to Frenchmen Pierre-Esprit Radisson and Médard des Groseilliers, who likely reached Minnesota in 1654 after exploring Wisconsin.

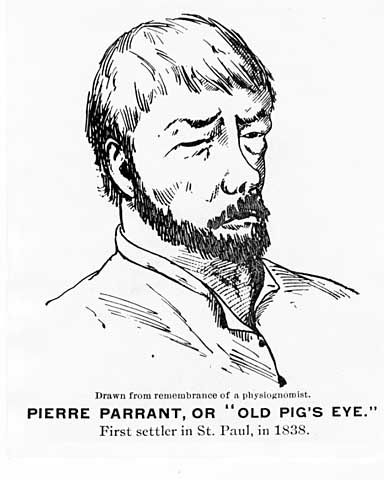
Pierre "Pig's Eye" Parrant, first settler in Saint Paul, Minnesota

A few years later, explorer Cavelier de la Salle charted the Mississippi, ending his voyage in the neighboring state of North Dakota. He gave this region the nickname of "L'étoile du Nord" (Star of the North), which eventually became the motto of the State of Minnesota.

Former state seal

The exploration of the northern territories and areas surrounding the Great Lake, including Minnesota, was encouraged by Frontenac, the Governor of New France.

In the early days of Minnesota's settlement, many of its early European inhabitants were of Canadian origin, including Pierre Parrant, a trapper and fur trader born in Sault Ste. Marie (Michigan) in 1777.

The Red River Métis community also played an important part in the use of French in Minnesota.

Since 1858, when the State of Minnesota was established, the Great Seal of the State of Minnesota bears Cavelier de la Salle's French motto "L'étoile du Nord".

In present-day Minnesota, French is maintained alive through bilingual education options and French-language classes in universities and schools. It is also promoted by local associations and groups such as AFRAN (Association des Français du Nord), who support events such as the Chautauqua Festival in Huot, an event celebrating the French heritage of local communities.

In 2012, a Franco-fête Festival was held in Minneapolis. Similar events take place every year throughout the state of Minnesota.

Since Minnesota shares a border with French-speaking areas of Canada, French exchanges remain common. In 2004, an estimated 35% of Minnesota's production was being exported to Francophone countries (Canada, France, Belgium and Switzerland).

== Mississippi Creoles ==
In April 1699, French colonists established the first European settlement at Fort Maurepas (also known as Old Biloxi), built in the vicinity of present-day Ocean Springs on the Gulf Coast. It was settled by Pierre Le Moyne d'Iberville. In 1716, the French founded Natchez on the Mississippi River (as Fort Rosalie); it became the dominant town and trading post of the area. The French called the greater territory "New France"; the Spanish continued to claim part of the Gulf coast area (east of Mobile Bay) of present-day southern Alabama, in addition to the entire area of present-day Florida. The British assumed control of the French territory after the French and Indian War.

=== Biloxi, First Capital of French Louisiana ===
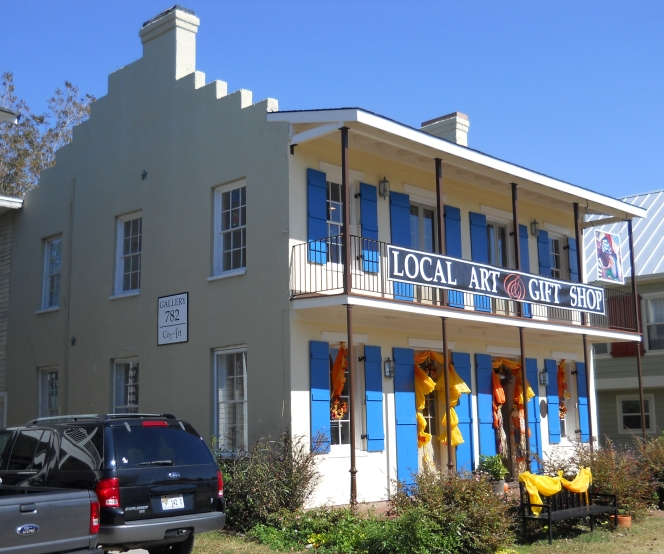
Mississippi Creole architecture in the Biloxi Downtown Historic District, built in 1846.

Old Biloxi was completed on May 1, 1699 under direction of French explorer Pierre Le Moyne d'Iberville, who sailed for France on May 4. He appointed his teenage brother Jean-Baptiste Le Moyne de Bienville as second in command after the French commandant Sauvolle de la Villantry (c.1671–1701).

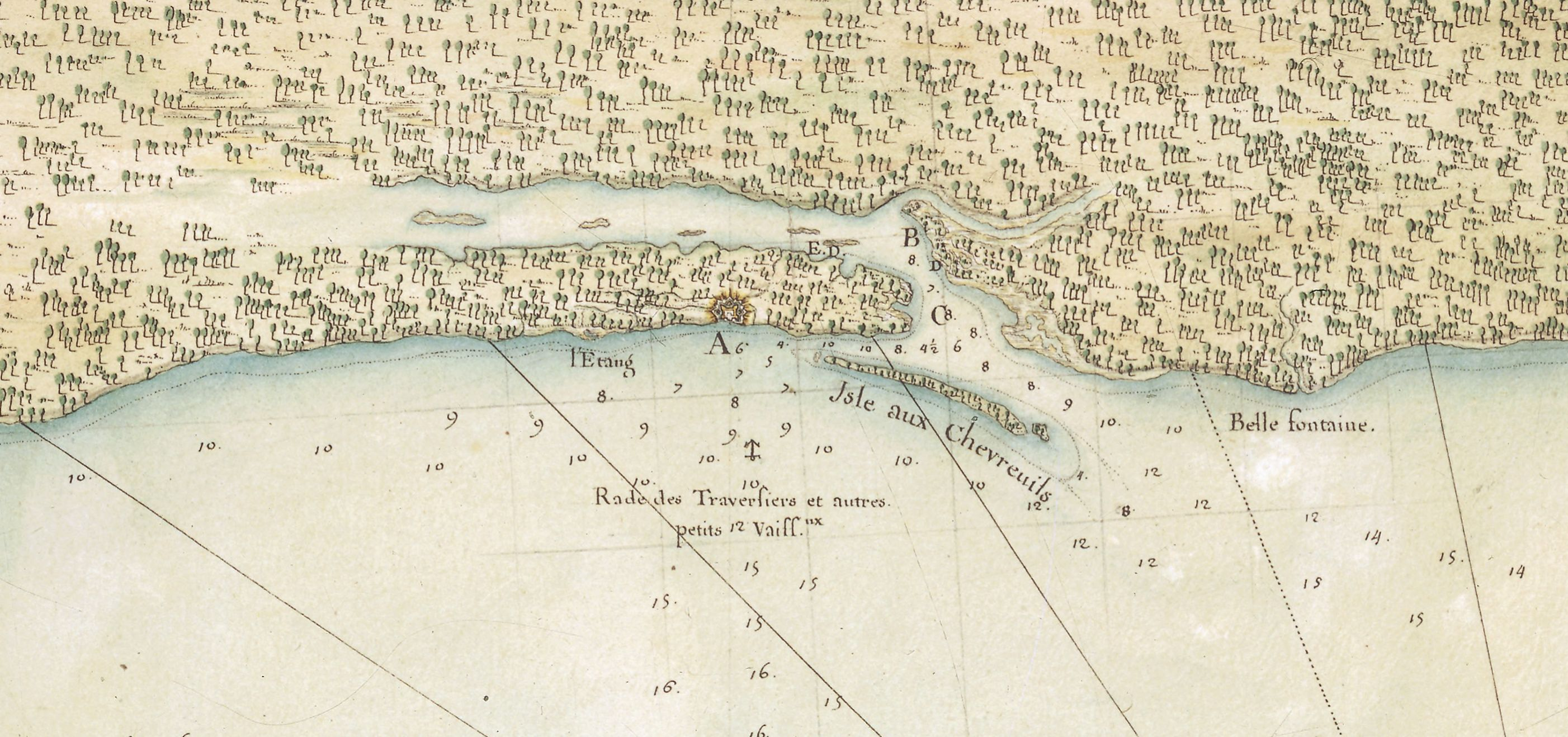
Vieux Biloxi (Fort Maurepas) on the Biloxi Coast (site B on the map)

M. d'Iberville originally intended to establish a French colony along the Mississippi River. However, because of its flooding, he had been unable to find a suitable location during his first voyage of discovery up the Mississippi in March 1699. He returned from his river journey on April 1, and spent another week in searching the shores adjacent to Ship Island, where the fleet had been anchored.

On Tuesday, April 7, 1699, d'Iberville and Surgeres observed "an elevated place that appeared very suitable". This spot was on the northeast shore of Biloxi Bay. They had found the bay was 7–8 feet (2 m) deep. They decided to construct the fort there, as they "could find no spot more convenient, and our provisions were failing, we could search no longer". On Wednesday, April 8, they commenced to cut away the trees preparatory for construction of the fort. All the men "worked vigorously", and by the end of the month, the fort had been finished. They also carved what is known as the Iberville stone, claiming the site for France. This is now held by the Louisiana State Museum.

The expedition journal reported:

In the meantime, the boats were actively engaged transporting the powder, guns, and ammunition, as well as the live stock, such as bulls, cows, hogs, fowls, turkeys, etc. . . . The fort was made with four bastions, two of them squared logs, from 2–3 feet [1 m] thick, placed one upon the other, with embrasures for port holes, and a ditch all around. The other two bastions were stockaded with heavy timbers which took four men to lift one of them. Twelve guns were mounted.

— Historical Jour, of d'Iberville's expedition

The best men were selected to remain at the fort, including detachments of soldiers to place with the Canadians (the French also had a colony in what is now Quebec and along the upper Mississippi River) and workmen, and sailors to serve on the gunboats. Altogether about 100 people were left at Fort Maurepas while Iberville sailed back to France on May 4, 1699. Those remaining included:

- M. de Sauvolle de la Villantry, lieutenant of a company and naval ensign of the frigate Le Marin, was left in command as governor.
- Bienville, king's lieutenant of the marine guard of the frigate La Badine was next in command.
- Le Vasseur de Boussouelle, a Canadian, was major.
- De Bordenac was chaplain, and M. Care was surgeon.
- Also: two captains, two cannoniers, four sailors, eighteen filibusters, ten mechanics, 6 masons, 13 Canadians, and 20 sub-officers and soldiers who comprised the garrison.

Few of the colonists were experienced with agriculture, and the colony never became self-sustaining. The climate and soil were different than they were familiar with. On the return of d'Iberville to Old Biloxi in January 1700, he brought with him sixty Canadian immigrants and a large supply of provisions and stores. On this second voyage, he was instructed:

to breed the Buffalo at Biloxi; to seek for pearls; to examine the wild mulberry with the view to silk [silk worms on leaves]; the timber for shipbuilding, and to seek for mines. Expeditions in search of gold, jewels and valuable furs were the main goals of the colonists. They made thorough explorations of the Mississippi River and the surrounding country.

In 1700, Le Sueur was sent to the upper Mississippi with 20 men to establish a fort in the Sioux country. His government intended to take over the copper mines of the Sioux nations in the interests of France. Meanwhile, the French had established forts and settlements in the Illinois country. Learning of the French colony at Old Biloxi, Canadians came by the boatload down the Mississippi from the upper country (today's Quebec).

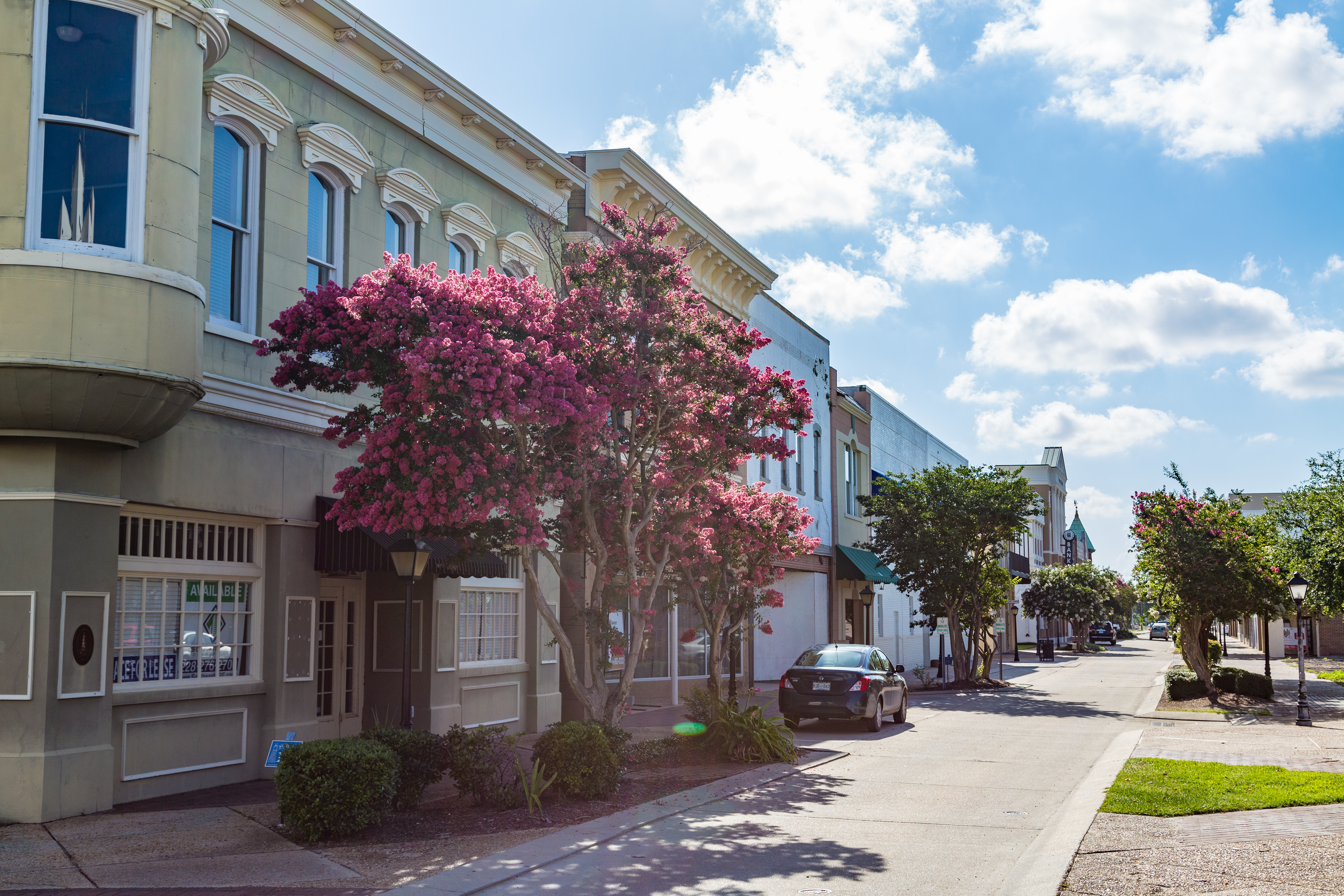
Mississippi Creole architecture in the Biloxi Downtown Historic District.

Fathers Davion and Montigny, accompanied by a few Frenchmen, were the first visitors at the fort, having made the journey downriver in canoes. In May 1700, the settlers were visited by M. Sagan, a traveler from Canada. He carried a request from the French minister to the governor M. de Sauvolle, asking that Sagan be furnished with 24 pirogues and 100 Canadians to explore the Missouri River and its branches, a major tributary of the Mississippi that has its confluence at what later developed as Saint Louis. During the absence of d'Iberville, his young brother Bienville made further expeditions to try to secure the prosperity of the colony. But the colonists suffered from tropical diseases of the region: many died from yellow fever, including the governor, M. de Sauvolle, who died in the summer of 1700. Bienville became ranking chief in command, and acted as commandant.

On September 16, 1700, a party of Choctaw warriors arrived at Biloxi, asking for French troops to help them fight against the Chickasaw, their traditional enemies among native groups. The Choctaw during this period had 40 villages, with more than 5,000 warriors. On October 25, 20 Mobile natives arrived at Fort Maurepas. They were said to have about 400 fighting men.

On December 18, 1700, a shallop arrived from the Spanish settlement at Pensacola to the east, with the news that d'Iberville and Serigny had reached there with the king's ships, the Renommée of fifty guns, and the Palmier of 44 guns. This was welcome news to the garrison, which had been living for more than 3 months on little more than corn. They had lost more than 60 men due to disease, leaving only 150 persons in the colony. Bienville was ordered to evacuate Biloxi, and move to a settlement on the Mobile River.

On January 5, 1701, Bienville departed for the Mobile River, leaving 20 men under the command of M. de Boisbriant as garrison at the fort. At Dauphin Island, Bienville met with his brothers de Serigny and Chateaugue, who had arrived with a detachment of sailors and workmen. They were to build a magazine for storage of goods and provisions which had been brought from France. On the Kith, he commenced to build the Fort Louis de la Mobile, about 12 leagues above the present city of Mobile, on the right bank of the river. It was the official center of the Gulf Coast colony for the next nine years, until the new Fort Conde was built. (Mobile city developed around it.)

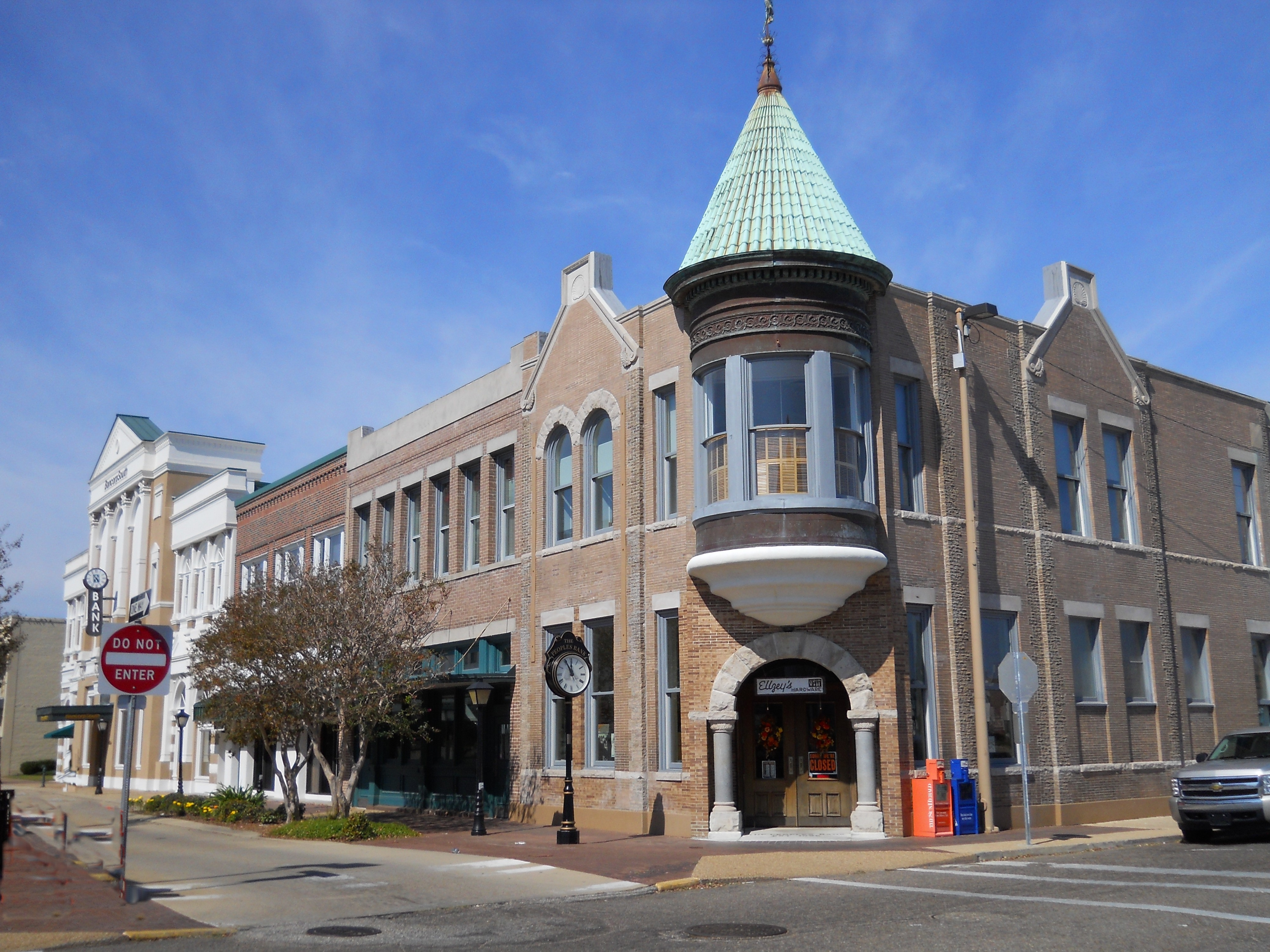
Lameuse street, Biloxi, Mississippi.

In 1717, when the channel at Dauphine island (present-day Dauphin Island) had become choked with sand, de l'Épinay and de Bienville decided to make use of the harbor at Ship Island. They ordered a new fort to be constructed on the mainland opposite, selecting a place one league west of Old Biloxi for a site across Biloxi Bay. The transport ship Dauphine, commanded by M. Berranger, had arrived with many carpenters and masons. They built the new fort, known as New Biloxi (Nouveau-Biloxi) and also as Fort Louis. In 1719, Fort Maurepas (at Old Biloxi) was burned; it was never reconstructed by the French. Another fort and magazines were also constructed on Ship Island, in the Gulf of Mexico.

In 1719, the administrative capital of French Louisiana was moved to Old Biloxi from Mobile (or Mobille), during the War of the Quadruple Alliance (1718–1720) against Spain. Due to hurricanes and shifting sand bars blocking harbor waters during the early 18th century, the capital of French Louisiana was moved from Mobile to Nouveau-Biloxi (present-day Biloxi), across Biloxi Bay. However, later in the same year, Fort Maurepas (at Old Biloxi) burned. It was never reconstructed.

Later, during June–August 1722, the capital was moved again, by colonial governor Bienville, from Biloxi to deeper waters in the Mississippi River at a new inland harbor town named La Nouvelle-Orléans (New Orleans), built for the purpose during 1718–1722.

=== Natchez, Mississippi ===
Natchez, Mississippi, facing the Mississippi River.

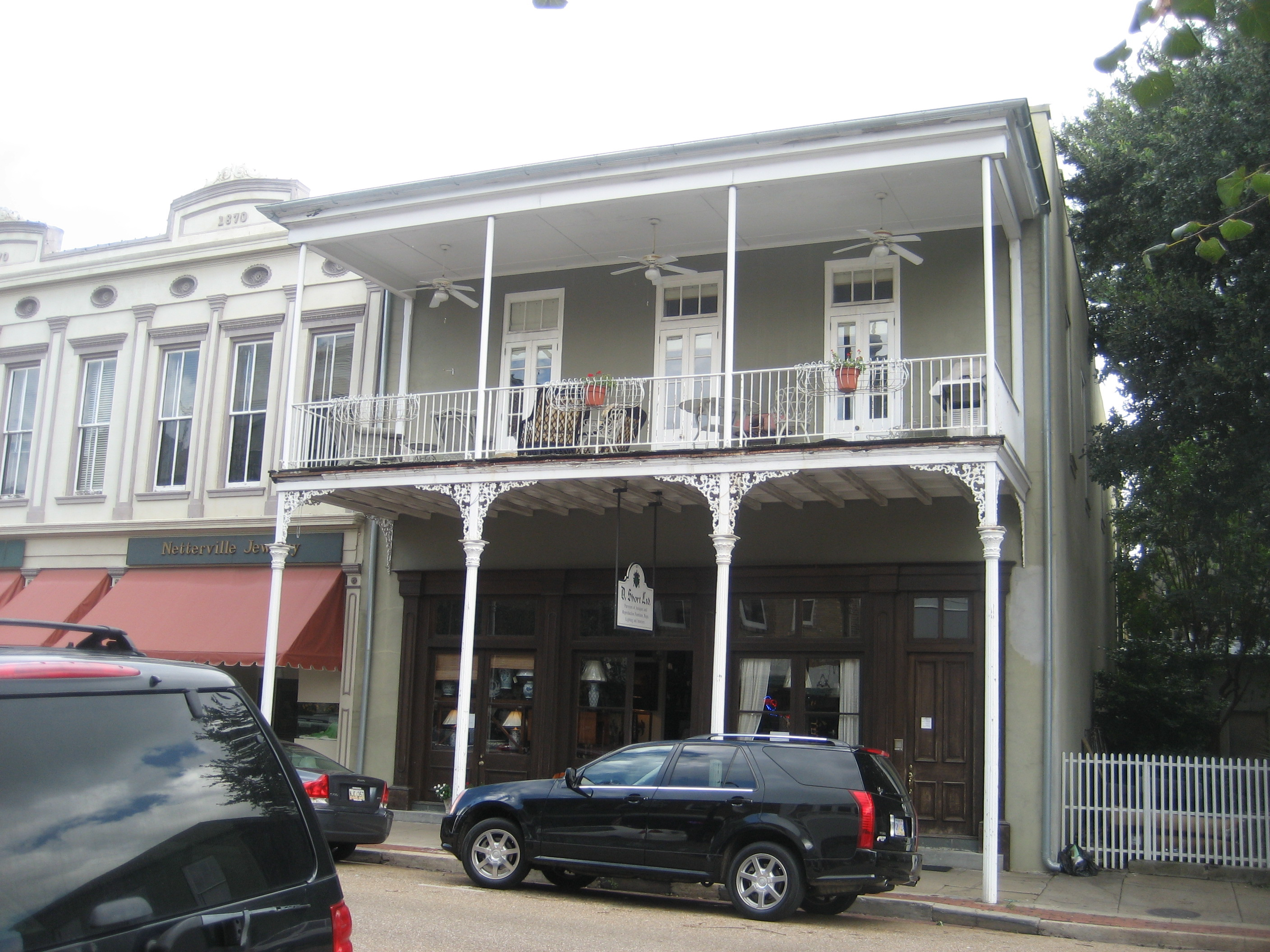
Mississippi Creole architecture in the Historic District of Natchez.

Established by French colonists in 1716, Natchez is one of the oldest and most important Louisiana French settlements in the lower Mississippi River Valley. After the French lost the French and Indian War (Seven Years' War), they ceded Natchez and near territory to Great Britain in the Treaty of Paris of 1763. (It later traded other territory east of the Mississippi River with Great Britain, which expanded what it called West Florida). The British Crown bestowed land grants in this territory to officers who had served with distinction in the war. These officers came mostly from the colonies of New York, New Jersey, and Pennsylvania. They established plantations and brought their upper-class style of living to the area.

Beginning 1779, the area was under Spanish colonial rule. After defeat in the American Revolutionary War, Great Britain ceded the territory to the United States under the terms of the Treaty of Paris (1783). Spain was not a party to the treaty, and it was their forces who had taken Natchez from the British. Although Spain had been allied with the American colonists, they were more interested in advancing their power at the expense of Britain. Once the war was over, they were not inclined to give up that which they had acquired by force.

In 1797 Major Andrew Ellicott of the United States marched to the highest ridge in the young town of Natchez, set up camp, and raised the first American Flag claiming Natchez and all former Spanish lands east of the Mississippi above the 31st parallel for the United States.

After the United States acquired this area from the Spanish, the city served as the capital of the Mississippi Territory and then of the state of Mississippi. It predates Jackson by more than a century; the latter replaced Natchez as the capital in 1822, as it was more centrally located in the developing state. The strategic location of Natchez, on a bluff overlooking the Mississippi River, ensured that it would be a pivotal center of trade, commerce, and the interchange of ethnic Native American, European, and African cultures in the region; it held this position for two centuries after its founding.

== Missouri French, Illinois Creoles ==
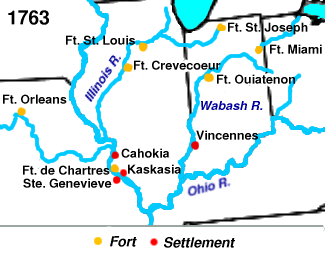
Illinois Creole settlements of the Illinois Country.

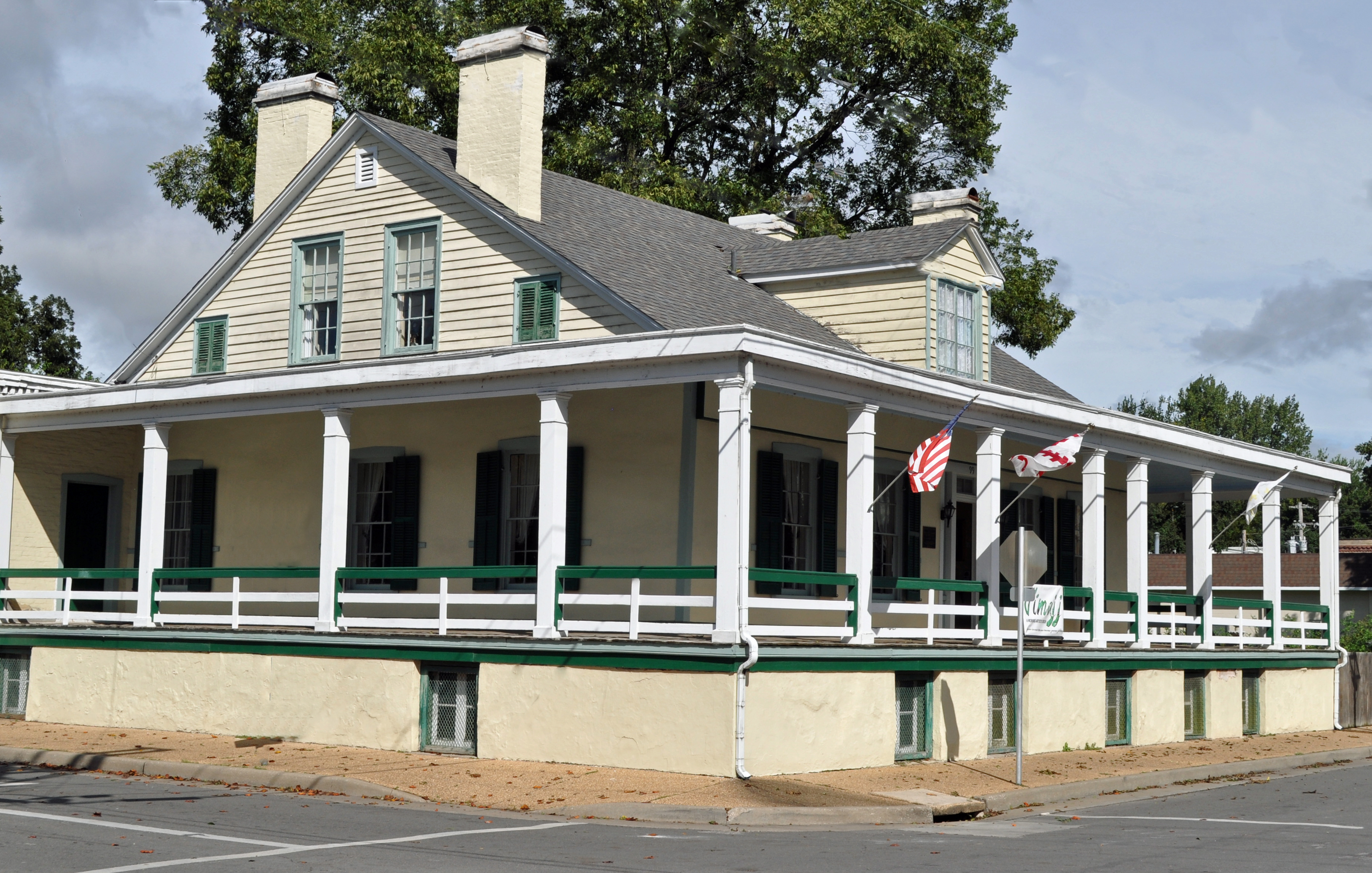
Illinois Creole architecture.

French colonization of the region began in earnest during the late 17th century by coureurs des bois from what is now modern-day Canada. With French colonial expansion into the North American interior, various missions, forts and trading posts were established under the administration of New France.

One of the first settlements to be established in the region was that of Cahokia in 1696, with the foundation of a French mission. The town quickly became one of the largest in the region with booming commerce and trade to assist its growth. Jesuit missionaries also established a mission to the south along the Kaskaskia River in 1703, followed by a stone church built in 1714. During that time, Canadien settlers had moved in and begun to farm. Some also mined for lead west of the Mississippi River. The fertile land of the American Bottom was tended to by habitants who moved from Prairie du Rocher. Soon the meager French post of Kaskaskia became the capital of Upper Louisiana, and Fort de Chartres was constructed nearby.

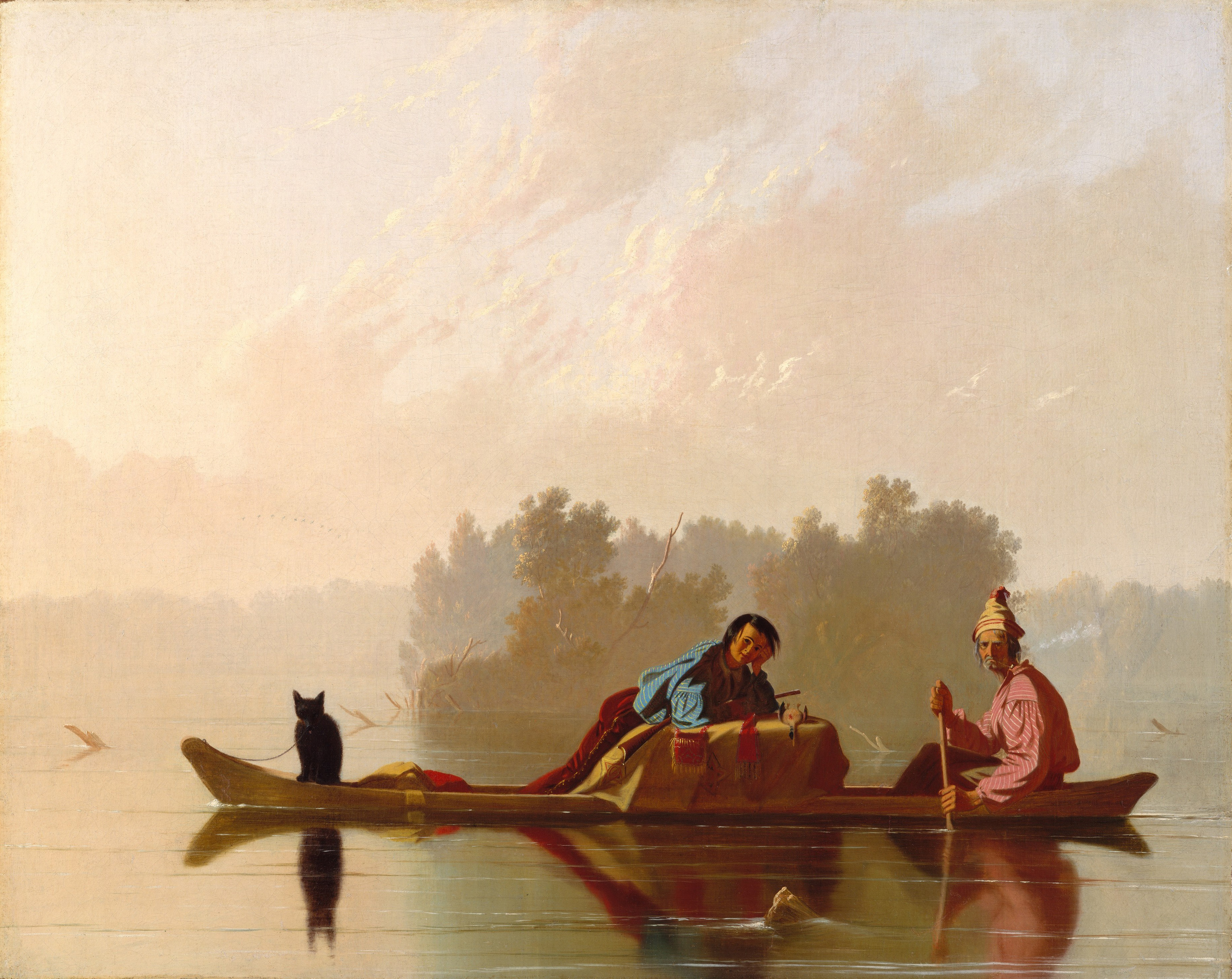
Fur Traders Descending the Missouri, 1845; a depiction of métis French Indians.

Since its inception, Kaskaskia possessed a diverse population, a majority of whom were Illinois or other Native American groups, with a minority of French voyageurs. Many of the Canadiens and their descendants would eventually become voyageurs and coureurs des bois. Continued immigration of Canadien settlers and natives of Illinois Country, as well as a need for other resources resulted in some founders establishing Sainte-Geneviève in 1735 on the west side of the Mississippi in what is now Missouri.

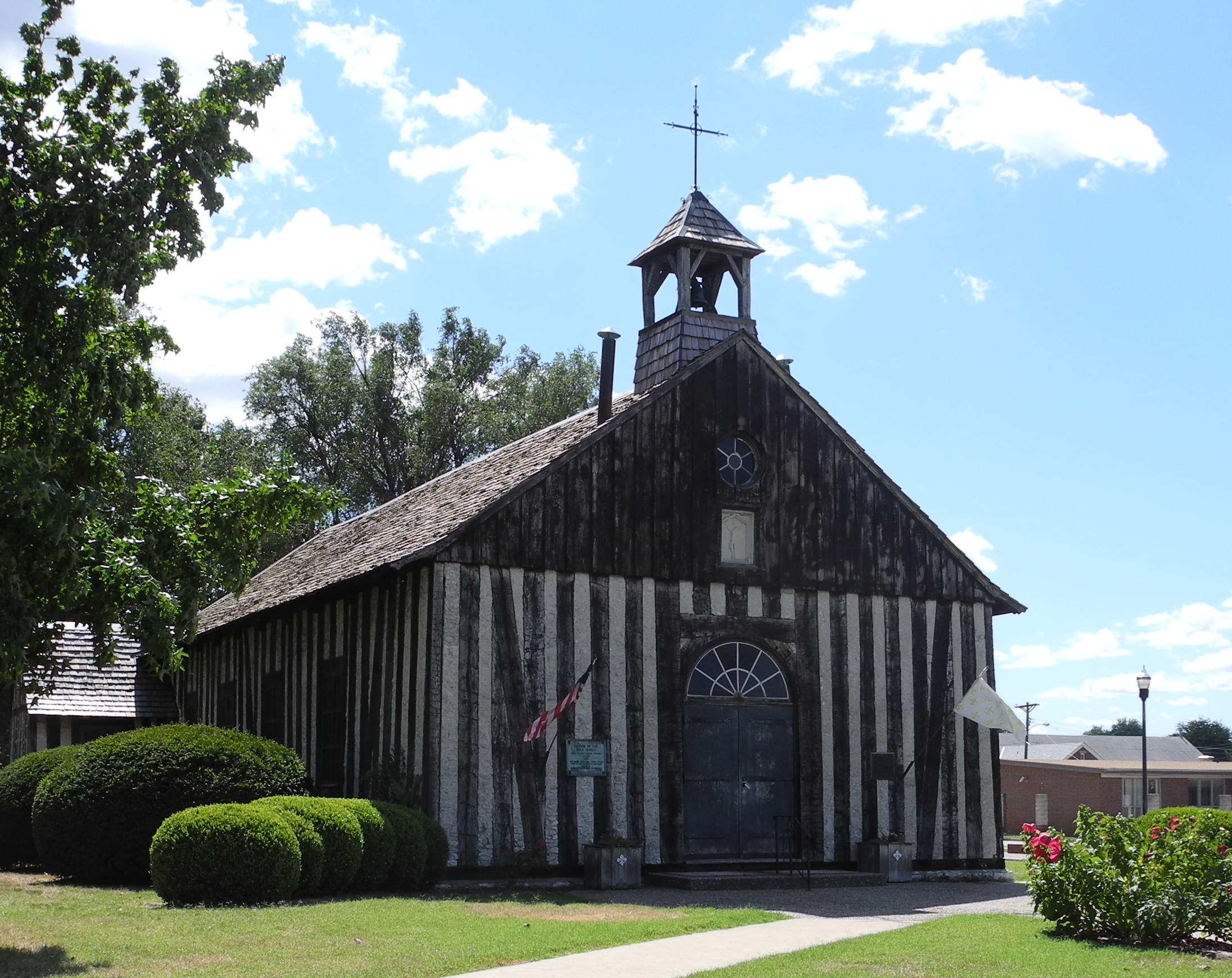
French Church of the Holy Family in Cahokia, Illinois.

In 1732, following a short-lived French trading post for buffalo hides, Vincennes was established as a French fur trading post for the French Indies Company under the leadership of François-Marie Bissot, Sieur de Vincennes. The trade was primarily with the Miami, and was so lucrative that more Canadiens were attracted to the post. In addition, marriages took place between French settlers (usually men) and women from the local Native American tribes. Both sides considered such unions to be to their advantage for long-term allianes and trading relationships.

Originally granted as a French trading post in 1763, St. Louis quickly developed into a settlement under Pierre Laclède. By this time, the French had established several footholds along the upper Mississippi River such as Cahokia, Kaskaskia, St. Philippe, Nouvelle Chartres, Prairie du Rocher, and Ste. Genevieve. Even so, after the British victory in the French and Indian War in 1763, many francophone residents of Illinois Country moved west of the Mississippi River to Ste. Genevieve, St. Louis, and elsewhere. Additionally, following France's loss in the War, Louisiana was ceded to Spain in Treaty of Fontainebleau. Several hundred French refugees from the Midwest were resettled at Ste. Genevieve by the Spanish in 1797. From the end of the French and Indian War through the early 19th century, francophones began settling in the Ozark highlands further inland, particularly after French Louisiana was sold to the United States in 1803.

=== Upper Louisiana ===
It is speculated that Native Americans may have already begun to process lead in the Upper Louisiana Valley by the 18th century, in part due to interaction with coureurs des bois and European expeditions. French demand for lead quickly outstripped available labor despite French colonial reliance on Native Americans, freelancer miners, and 500 African slaves shipped from Saint-Domingue in 1723 to work in the area of Mine à Breton, under control of Philippe François de Renault . With large quantities of ore visible from the surface, entire Creole families moved inland to exploit such plentiful resources. When Moses Austin settled in Potosi, formally Mine à Breton, he introduced serious mining operations into Missouri in 1797 and stimulated growth of the francophone community in the area. Mining communities such as Old Mines (French: La Vieille Mine), Mine La Motte, and St. Michel (St. Michaels), which were established further inland, remained well-connected to Ste. Genevieve through trade, familial ties, and a formed common identity.

==== Fort de Chartres, Louisiana French Castle ====
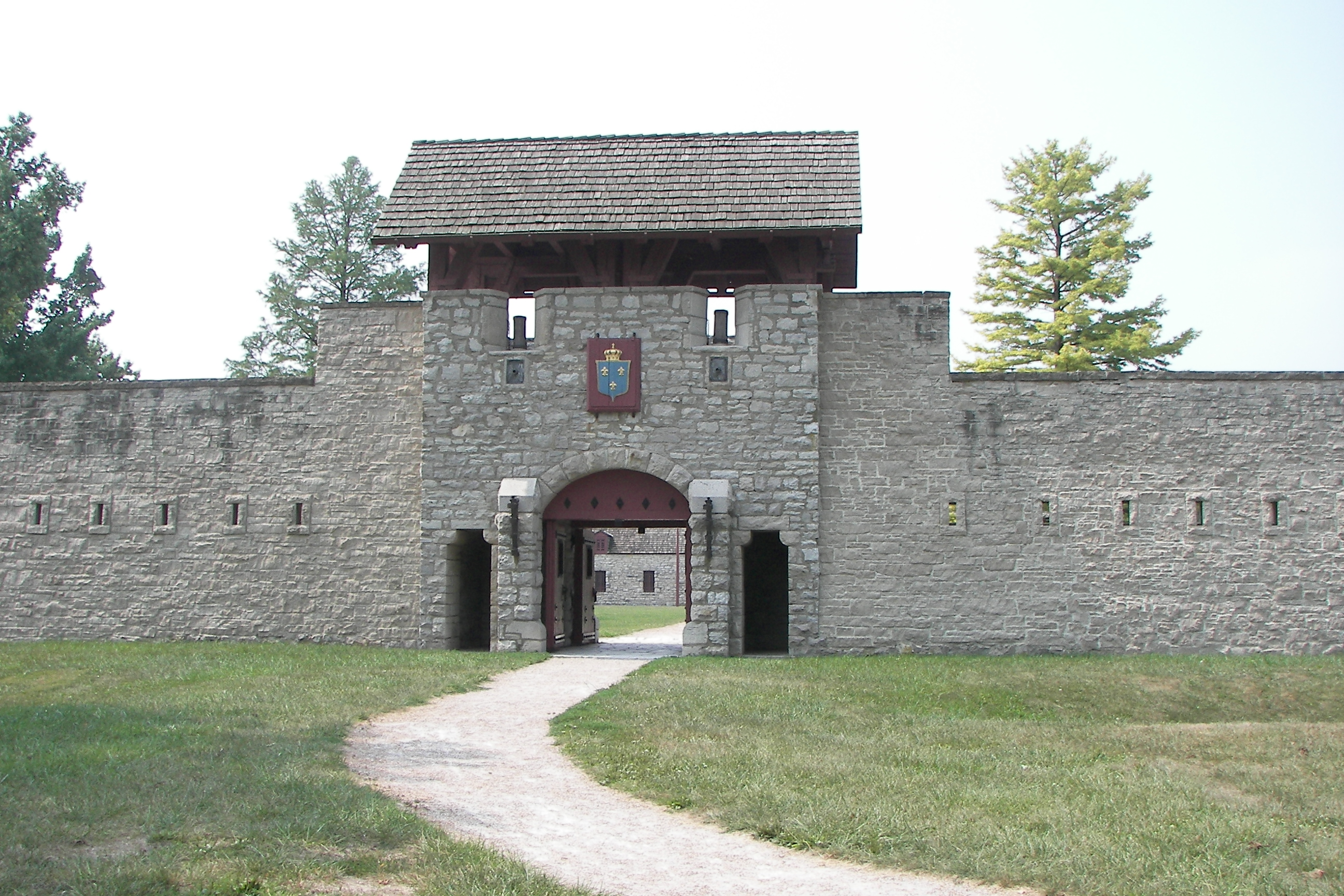
Fort de Chartres, a Louisiana French castle.

On January 1, 1718, a trade monopoly was granted to John Law's Company. Hoping to make a fortune mining precious metals in the area, the company with a military contingent sent from New Orleans built a fort to protect its interests. Construction began on the first Fort de Chartres (in present-day Illinois) in 1718 and was completed in 1720.

The original fort was located on the east bank of the Mississippi River, downriver (south) from Cahokia and upriver of Kaskaskia. The nearby settlement of Prairie du Rocher, Illinois, was founded by French-Canadian colonists in 1722, a few miles inland from the fort.

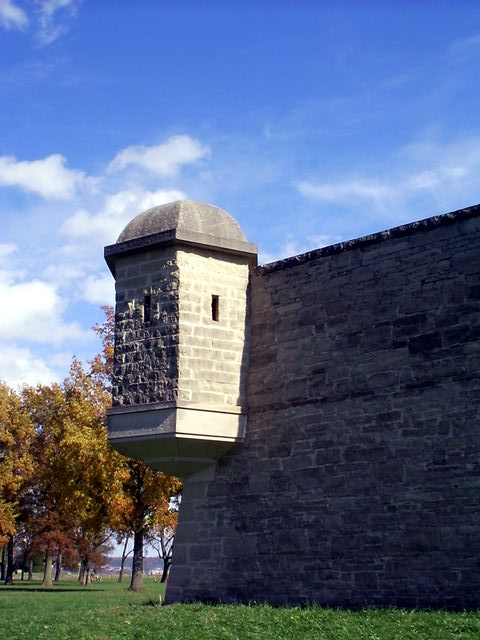
A bartizan at the corner of one of the reconstructed bastions

The fort was to be the seat of government for the Illinois Country and help to control the Meskwaki, which was seen as a threat. The fort was named after Louis, duc de Chartres, son of the regent of France. Because of frequent flooding, another fort was built further inland in 1725. By 1731, the Company of the Indies had gone defunct and turned Louisiana and its government back to the king. The garrison at the fort was removed to Kaskaskia, Illinois in 1747, about 18 miles to the south. A new stone fort was planned near the old fort and was described as "nearly complete" in 1754, although construction continued until 1760.

The new stone fort was headquarters for the French Illinois Country for less than 20 years, as it was turned over to the British in 1763 with the Treaty of Paris at the end of the French and Indian War. The British Crown declared almost all the land between the Appalachian Mountains and the Mississippi River from Florida to Newfoundland a Native American territory called the Indian Reserve following the Royal Proclamation of 1763. The government ordered settlers to leave or get a special license to remain. This and the desire to live in a Catholic territory caused many of the Illinois Creoles to cross the Mississippi to live in St. Louis or Ste. Genevieve, Missouri. The British soon relaxed its policy and later extended the Province of Quebec to the region.

The British took control of Fort de Chartres on October 10, 1765, and renamed it Fort Cavendish. The British softened the initial expulsion order and offered the Creole inhabitants the same rights and privileges enjoyed under French rule. In September 1768, the British established a Court of Justice, the first court of common law in the Mississippi Valley (the French law system is called civil law).

After severe flooding in 1772, the British saw little value in maintaining the fort and abandoned it. They moved the military garrison to the fort at Kaskaskia and renamed it Fort Gage. Chartres' ruined but intact magazine is considered the oldest surviving European structure in Illinois and was reconstructed in the 20th century, with much of the rest of the Fort.

==== Americanization of the Illinois Country ====
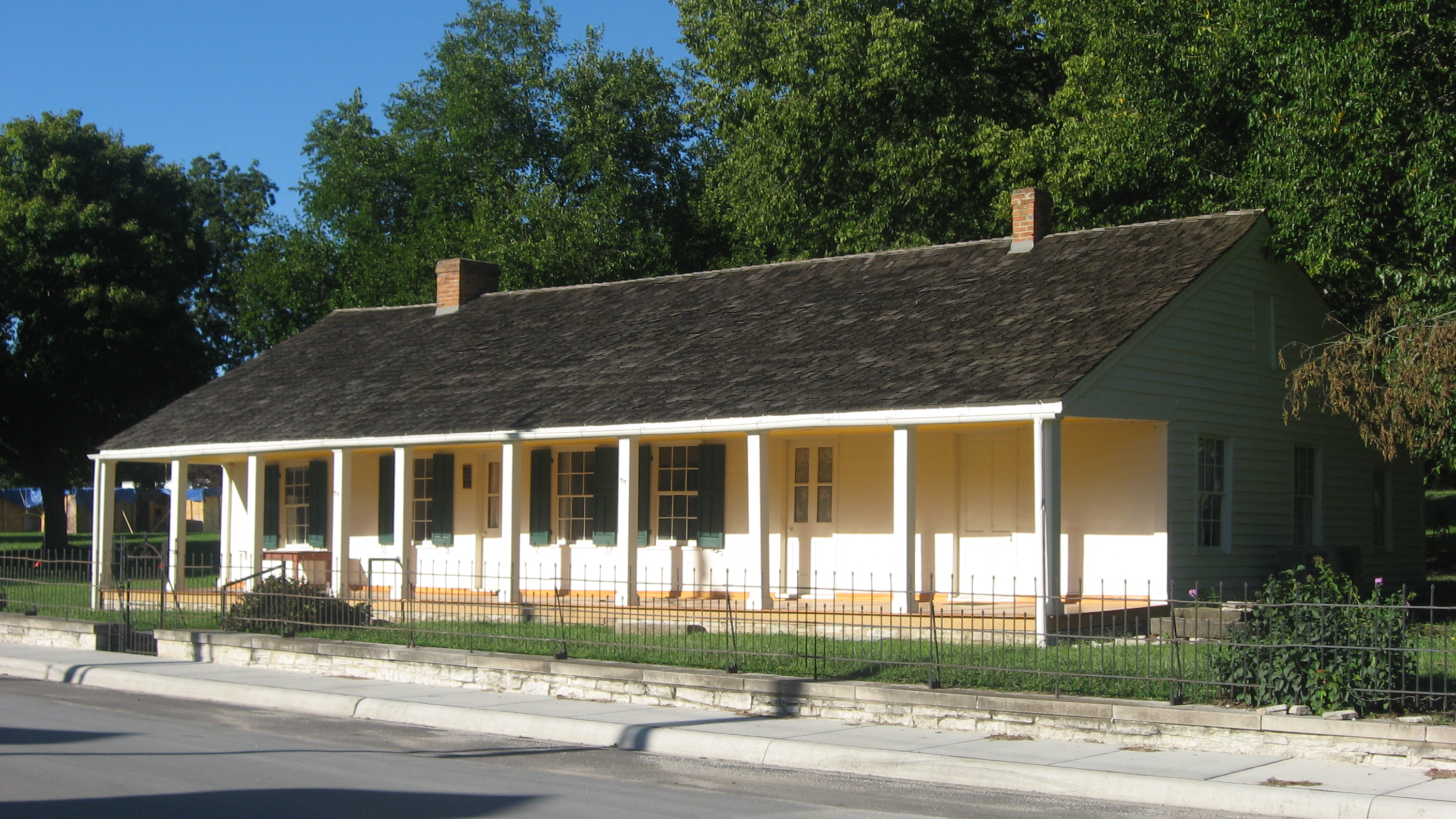
An Illinois Creole house of Prairie du Rocher, Illinois.

The Louisiana Purchase brought about a marked change: francophones of Ste. Genevieve and St. Louis assimilated more rapidly into English-speaking American society because of interaction with new settlers, while the inland mining communities remained isolated and maintained their French heritage. Piocheurs held fast to primitive techniques, using hand tools and simple pit mining. They performed smelting over crude, chopped-wood fires. Soon, ethnic French families in St. Louis and Ste. Genevieve, as well as American companies, purchased the land occupied by the Creoles. They created a division between an increasingly anglophone authority and francophone labor. By the 1820s production of lead had declined in the area of Old Mines. Following the Civil War, new mining technologies left the community impoverished.

The eventual decline of Illinois Country French did not occur at the same rates as it inevitably did in other areas. Most attribute the survival of the language in Old Mines primarily due to its relative isolation, as compared to other communities such as St. Louis or Ste. Genevieve.

In 1809, the French street signs of St. Louis were replaced, but the population remained largely ethnic French through the 19th century. Migration of francophones from New Orleans, Kaskaskia, and Detroit bolstered the French-speaking population. Two French-language newspapers, Le Patriote (text=The Patriot) and La Revue de l'Ouest (text=The Review of the West) were published during the second half of the 19th century, with an intended audience of the "French-language population of 'The West'", but the papers fell out of print before the turn of the century.

Outside of St. Louis, French survived into the 20th century but the francophone population of settlements near the Mississippi River had dropped dramatically:

... few Créoles to be found today in the towns along the river, with the exception of Festus and Crystal City, where many of them are employed in the factories. Sainte-Geneviève has no more than a score of families which have remained definitely French.

— Ward Allison Dorrance, The Survival of French in the Old District of Sainte-Geneviève, 1935

French did not fare far better in distant Vincennes where German immigration in the 1860s had severely weakened the French community and by 1930 there were only a small population of elderly francophones left.

In the 1930s and 1940s, use of new excavation equipment by mineral companies almost entirely pushed French-speaking Creoles from mining, leaving them without income. French became associated with poverty, lack of education, and backwardness. Harassment and intolerance from English speakers left many Missouri French speakers ashamed of their language and hesitant to speak. Use of French on school property was prohibited and it was not uncommon for students to face corporal punishment by monolingual, English-speaking teachers for using the language.

In 1930, French professor W. M. Miller visited this area of rural Missouri, finding the largest remaining concentration of Missouri French speakers in a small pocket south of De Soto and north of Potosi. He estimated their population to be about 2,000, all bilingual. There were rumors that at least a few elderly, French monolingual speakers remained, but few young people spoke the language and their children were all monolingual English speakers. From 1934 to 1936, Joseph Médard Carrière made several trips to the Old Mines area to study the Missouri French dialect and to collect folktales from local conteurs. Carrière estimated a total of 600 families still used the dialect. He noted the increased influence of English, particularly among younger speakers, and felt this was a sign of eventual displacement.

In 1977, Gerald L. Gold visited the community to document how movement away from family and child labor in lead and baryte mining coincided with the loss of Missouri French as a maternal language. He suggests that the 1970 census statistic of 196 native French speakers in Washington County underrepresented the true number of speakers. In 1989, Ulrich Ammon estimated that only a handful of elderly speakers remained in isolated pockets. In 2014 news media reported that fewer than 30 Missouri French speakers remained in Old Mines, with others being able to remember a few phrases.

== Ohio French ==
=== La Belle Rivière ===
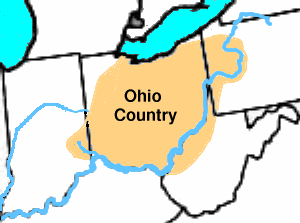
A map of the original Ohio Country

In the 17th century, the French were the first modern Europeans to explore what became known as Ohio Country. In 1663, it became part of New France, a royal province of the French Empire, and northeastern Ohio was further explored by Robert La Salle in 1669.

During the 18th century, the French set up a system of trading posts to control the fur trade in the region, linked to their settlements in present-day Canada and what they called the Illinois Country along the Mississippi River. Fort Miami on the site of present-day St. Joseph, Michigan was constructed in 1680 by New France Governor-General Louis de Buade de Frontenac. They built Fort Sandoské by 1750 (and perhaps a fortified trading post at Junundat in 1754).

By the 1730s, population pressure from expanding European colonies on the Atlantic coast compelled several groups of Native Americans to relocate to the Illinois Country. From the east, the Lenape and Shawnee arrived, and Wyandot and Odawa from the north. The Miami lived in what is now western Ohio. The Mingo formed out of Haudenosaunee who migrated west into the Ohio lands, as well as some refugee remnants of other tribes.

By the mid-18th century, British traders were rivaling French traders in the area. They had occupied a trading post called Loramie's Fort, which the French attacked from Canada in 1752, renaming it for a Frenchman named Loramie and establishing a trading post there. In the early 1750s George Washington was sent to the Ohio Country by the Ohio Company to survey, and the fight for control of the territory would spark the French and Indian War. It was in the Ohio Country where George Washington lost the Battle of Fort Necessity to Louis Coulon de Villiers in 1754, and the subsequent Battle of the Monongahela to Charles Michel de Langlade and Jean-Daniel Dumas to retake the country 1755. The Treaty of Paris ceded the country to Great Britain in 1763. During this period the country was routinely engaged in turmoil, with massacres and battles occurring between the Indian tribes.

== Wisconsin French ==
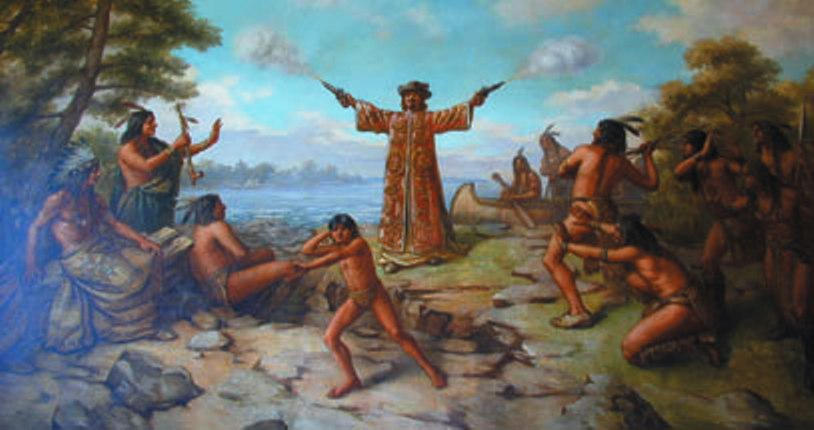
Jean Nicolet, depicted in a 1910 painting by Frank Rohrbeck, was probably the first European to explore Wisconsin. The mural is located in the Brown County Courthouse in Green Bay.

The first European to visit what became Wisconsin was probably the French explorer Jean Nicolet. He canoed west from Georgian Bay through the Great Lakes in 1634, and it is traditionally assumed that he came ashore near Green Bay at Red Banks. Pierre Radisson and Médard des Groseilliers visited Green Bay again in 1654–1666 and Chequamegon Bay in 1659–1660, where they traded for fur with local Native Americans. In 1673, Jacques Marquette and Louis Jolliet became the first to record a journey on the Fox-Wisconsin Waterway all the way to the Mississippi River near Prairie du Chien. Frenchmen like Nicholas Perrot continued to ply the fur trade across Wisconsin through the 17th and 18th centuries, but the French made no permanent settlements in Wisconsin before Britain won control of the region following the French and Indian War in 1763. Even so, French traders continued to work in the region after the war, and some, beginning with Charles de Langlade in 1764, settled in Wisconsin permanently, rather than returning to British-controlled Canada.

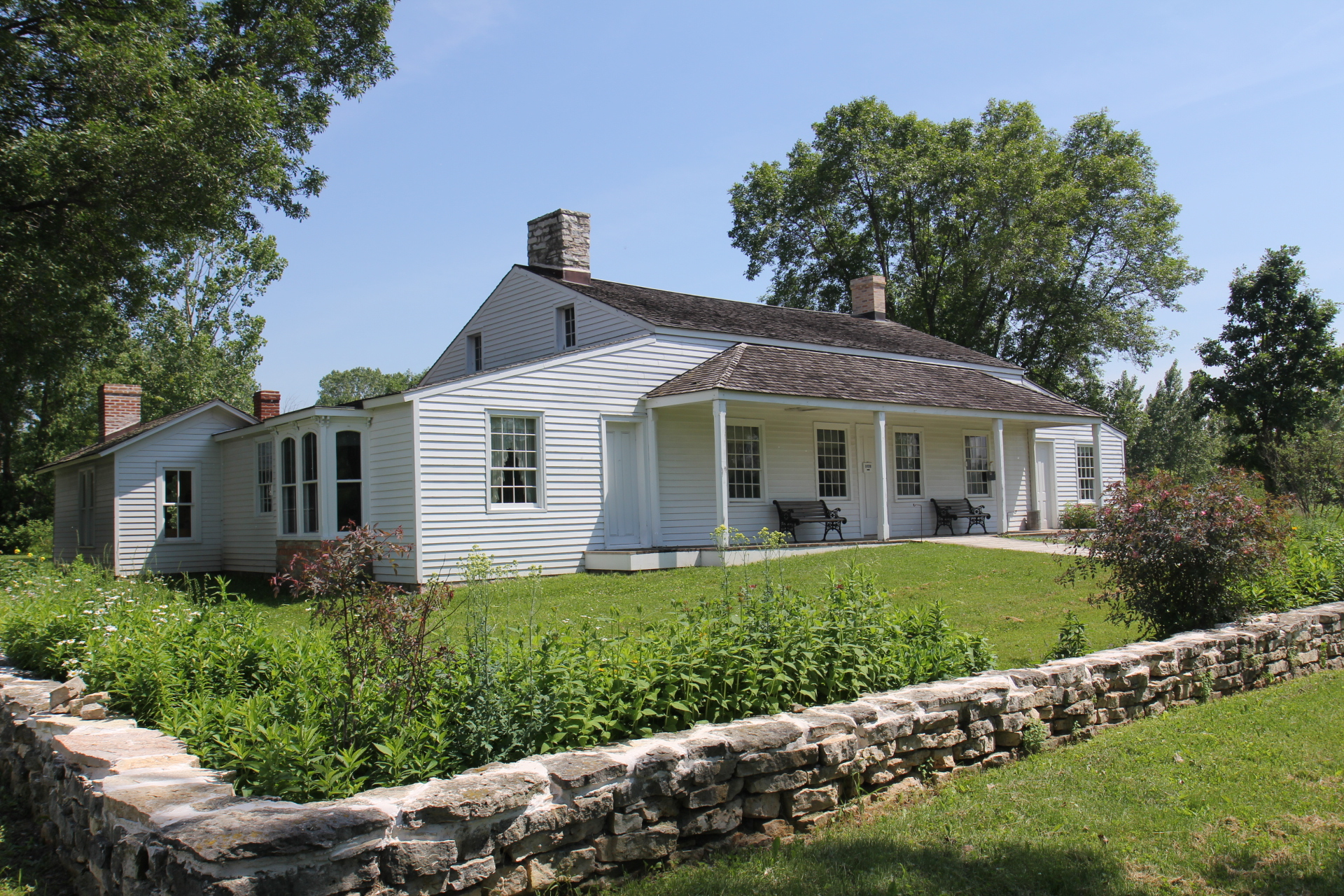
French-Canadian voyageur Joseph Roi built the Tank Cottage in Green Bay in 1776. Located in Heritage Hill State Historical Park, it is the oldest standing building from Wisconsin's early years and is listed on the National Register of Historic Places.

The British gradually took over Wisconsin during the French and Indian War, taking control of Green Bay in 1761 and gaining control of all of Wisconsin in 1763. Like the French, the British were interested in little but the fur trade. One notable event in the fur trading industry in Wisconsin occurred in 1791, when two free African Americans set up a fur trading post among the Menominee at present day Marinette. The first permanent settlers, mostly French Canadians, some Anglo-New Englanders and a few African American freedmen, arrived in Wisconsin while it was under British control. Charles de Langlade is generally recognized as the first settler, establishing a trading post at Green Bay in 1745, and moving there permanently in 1764. Settlement began at Prairie du Chien around 1781. The French residents at the trading post in what is now Green Bay, referred to the town as "La Baye". However, British fur traders referred to it as "Green Bay", because the water and the shore assumed green tints in early spring. The old French title was gradually dropped, and the British name of "Green Bay" eventually stuck. The region coming under British rule had virtually no adverse effect on the French residents as the British needed the cooperation of the French fur traders and the French fur traders needed the goodwill of the British. During the French occupation of the region licenses for fur trading had been issued scarcely and only to select groups of traders, whereas the British, in an effort to make as much money as possible from the region, issued licenses for fur trading freely, both to British and to French residents. The fur trade in what is now Wisconsin reached its height under British rule, and the first self-sustaining farms in the state were established as well. From 1763 to 1780, Green Bay was a prosperous community which produced its own foodstuff, built graceful cottages and held dances and festivities.
