= Timeline of Montgomery, Alabama =

The following is a timeline of the history of the city of Montgomery, Alabama, USA.

== 19th century ==
- 1819 - Montgomery incorporated.
- 1821
  - Montgomery Republican newspaper begins publication.
  - Franklin Society founded.
- 1824 - Presbyterian church and Montgomery Light Infantry established.
- 1828 - Alabama State Library headquartered in Montgomery.
- 1833 - Montgomery Advertiser newspaper in publication.
- 1847 - Sons of Temperance formed.
- 1850 - Lehman Brothers in business.
- 1851 - Alabama State Capitol built.
- 1861
  - February: Montgomery becomes capital of the Confederate States of America; First White House of the Confederacy established; Jefferson Davis sworn in as president.
  - May 21: Confederate capitol relocated from Montgomery to Richmond, Virginia.
- 1864 - Atlanta-Montgomery railroad destroyed by Union forces.
- 1867 - Swayne School built.
- 1870 - Population: 10,588.
- 1873 - Chamber of Commerce established.
- 1877 - Second Colored Baptist Church established.
- 1887 - Normal School for Colored Students opens.
- 1889 - Hale Infirmary founded.
- 1898 - Confederate monument dedicated.
- 1899 - Montgomery Library Association organized.
- 1900 - Population: 30,346.

== 20th century ==
- 1901 - Alabama Department of Archives and History headquartered in Montgomery.
- 1902 - St. Margaret's Hospital founded.
- 1907 - Bell Building constructed.
- 1910
  - Wright Flying School begins operating.
  - William Gunter becomes mayor.
- 1913 - Rotary Club of Montgomery organized.
- 1914 - Empire Theater built.
- 1916 - Commission form of government adopted.
- 1923 - Community Chest of Montgomery was established to address the needs of the community (known now as the River Region United Way) https://coc.centralalabamainc.com/river-region-united-way/
- 1926
  - Junior League of Montgomery organized.
  - Scottish Rite Temple constructed.
- 1927 - Jefferson Davis Hotel built.
- 1929
  - Municipal airport begins operating.
  - State Teachers College active.
- 1930
  - WSFA radio begins broadcasting.
  - Montgomery Museum of Fine Arts established.
- 1938
  - Coca-Cola bottling facility in operation.
  - WCOV radio begins broadcasting.
- 1940
  - Population: 78,084.
  - Veterans hospital begins operating.
- 1941 - Mayor William Gunter dies.
- 1942 - Montgomery Bible College founded.
- 1946 — A devastating and deadly tornado struck the western portion of the city. The tornado killed 26 people, injured 293 others, and caused a city-wide blackout which lasted for hours.
- 1947 - Alabama Historical Association headquartered in city.
- 1948 - U.S. Maxwell Air Force Base established.
  - Chiles-Whitted UFO encounter occurs.
- 1949 - City of Montgomery Library established.
- 1950 - Population: 106,525.
- 1953 - WCOV-TV (television) begins broadcasting.
- 1954 - WSFA television begins broadcasting.
- 1955 - December 1: Rosa Parks arrested; Montgomery bus boycott begins.
- 1956 - December 20: Racial segregation lawsuit Browder v. Gayle verdict takes effect; bus boycott ends.
- 1960 - Population: 134,393.
- 1961 - May 20: Freedom Riders attacked.
- 1964 - WKAB-TV begins broadcasting.
- 1965
  - March 7–25: Selma to Montgomery marches for voting rights.
  - March 25: Martin Luther King Jr. delivers "How Long, Not Long" speech.
- 1967
  - February 7: Dale's Penthouse fire.
  - Auburn University at Montgomery established.
  - Alabama Historical Commission headquartered in city.
- 1968 - Landmarks Foundation of Montgomery established.
- 1971 - Southern Poverty Law Center founded.
- 1972 - Montgomery Zoo opens.
- 1977
  - Wynnsong 10 cinema in business.
  - Emory Folmar becomes mayor.
- 1978 - Montgomery Genealogical Society established.
- 1980 - Population: 177,857.
- 1984 - Masjid Qasim Bilal El-Amin established.
- 1985 - Alabama Shakespeare Festival active.
- 1986 - Montgomery Area Food Bank established.
- 1989 - Civil Rights Memorial dedicated.
- 1990 - Population: 187,106.
- 1992 - Montgomery County Historical Society organized.
- 1995 - Equal Justice Initiative and F. Scott and Zelda Fitzgerald Museum established.
- 1997 - City website online (approximate date).
- 1999 - Bobby Bright becomes mayor.
- 2000 - Population: 201,568.

== 21st century ==
- 2005 - Hyundai Motor Manufacturing Alabama factory begins operating.
- 2009
  - Todd Strange becomes mayor.
  - Sister city agreement established with Pietrasanta, Italy.
- 2010 - Population: 205,764.
- 2011 - Martha Roby becomes U.S. representative for Alabama's 2nd congressional district and Terri Sewell becomes U.S. representative for Alabama's 7th congressional district.
- 2018 - April: National Memorial for Peace and Justice unveiled.
- 2019 - Steven Reed becomes mayor.
- 2020 - Population: 200,603.
  - Montgomery records highest homicides total.
- 2021 - Montgomery records highest homicide rate in history. At 77 homicides.
- 2023 – On August 5, a viral brawl on a riverfront dock between the owners of a pontoon boat and the co-captain of the city-owned riverboat, Harriot II, gained national attention due to the violent nature and racial undertones.
- 2025 – On October 4, a shootout between multiple individuals in downtown Montgomery killed two people and injured 12 others.

== See also ==
- History of Montgomery, Alabama
- List of mayors of Montgomery, Alabama
- National Register of Historic Places listings in Montgomery County, Alabama
- Timelines of other cities in Alabama: Birmingham, Huntsville, Mobile, Tuscaloosa

== Bibliography ==
Published in the 19th century

- Montgomery City Directory. Advertiser Book and Job Printing Office. 1859.
- Code of the City of Montgomery, Montgomery, Ala: Gaines & Smith, printers, 1861, OCLC 5390201, OL 6531215M
- R.H. Long (1863), "Montgomery", Hunt's Gazetteer of the Border and Southern States, Pittsburgh, Pa.: John P. Hunt
- Directory of the City of Montgomery. Perry & Smith. 1866 – via Internet Archive.
- Jesse D. Beale; S. H. Phelan (1878). City Directory and History of Montgomery, Alabama. T.C. Bingham – via HathiTrust. (includes "A Brief History of Montgomery" by M.P. Blue)
- Berney, Saffold (1878), "Montgomery", Handbook of Alabama, Mobile: Mobile Register print.
- M. P. Blue, Churches of the City of Montgomery, Montgomery, 1878.
- McCall (1885). Sketch, historical and statistical, of the city of Montgomery.
- "Montgomery", Northern Alabama, Birmingham, Ala: Smith & De Land, 1888, OCLC 4215188
- "Montgomery", Rand, McNally & Co.'s Handy Guide to the Southeastern States, Chicago: Rand, McNally & Co., 1899

Published in the 20th century

- Montgomery (Ala (1902). Code of Ordinances of the City Council of Montgomery.
- "Montgomery", The United States (4th ed.), Leipzig: K. Baedeker, 1909, OCLC 02338437
- Tintgail Club (1920), Official guide to the city of Montgomery, Alabama, Montgomery: Paragon Press, OL 24158387M
- Thomas McAdory Owen (1921). "Montgomery". History of Alabama and Dictionary of Alabama Biography. Vol. 2. S. J. Clarke Publishing Company. pp. 1037–1040. hdl:2027/mdp.39015078279422.
- Federal Writers' Project (1941), "Montgomery", Alabama; a Guide to the Deep South, American Guide Series, New York: Hastings House, hdl:2027/uc1.b4469723
- Code of the city of Montgomery, Alabama, 1952. Michie City Publications Co. 1952 – via HathiTrust.
- Clanton W. Williams. The Early History of Montgomery and Incidentally of the State of Alabama. Tuscaloosa: University of Alabama Press, 1976
- Brown, Lynda; et al. (1998). "Chronology". Alabama History: An Annotated Bibliography. Greenwood Press. ISBN 978-0-313-28223-2.

Published in the 21st century

- J. Mills Thornton (2002). "Montgomery". Dividing Lines: Municipal Politics and the Struggle for Civil Rights in Montgomery, Birmingham, and Selma. University of Alabama Press. pp. 20–140. ISBN 978-0-8173-1170-4.
- Paul T. Hellmann (2006). "Alabama: Montgomery". Historical Gazetteer of the United States. Routledge. p. 16+. ISBN 1-135-94859-3.
- Wesley Phillips Newton (2010). Montgomery in the Good War: Portrait of a Southern City, 1939-1946. University of Alabama Press. ISBN 978-0-8173-5632-3.
- Jeffrey C. Benton (2013). Respectable and Disreputable: Leisure Time in Antebellum Montgomery. NewSouth Books. ISBN 978-1-60306-229-9.
