= Timeline of Mobile, Alabama =

City history timeline

Coordinates: 30.694°N 88.043°W

The following is a timeline of the history of the city of Mobile, Alabama, USA.

== Prior to 19th century ==
- 1702 - Fort Louis de la Mobile founded by Jean-Baptiste Le Moyne de Bienville of Montreal.
- 1703 - Mardi Gras begins.
- 1722 - French Louisiana capital relocated from Mobile to New Orleans.
- 1723 - Fort Conde built.
- 1763 - Mobile becomes part of British West Florida per Treaty of Paris (1763).
- 1780 - March: Battle of Fort Charlotte; Spanish in power.
- 1783 - Mobile becomes part of Spanish West Florida per Treaty of Paris (1783).

== 19th century ==
- 1810 - Mobile becomes part of the independent Republic of West Florida.
- 1813
  - Spanish West Florida annexed to the United States.
  - Mobile Gazette newspaper begins publication.
- 1814 - Town of Mobile incorporated.
- 1819 - City of Mobile incorporated.
- 1821 - Mobile Commercial Register begins publication.
- 1823 - Christ Church Cathedral established.
- 1827 - Fire.
- 1829 - Mobile Female Benevolent Society founded.
- 1830
  - Spring Hill College and City Hospital established.
  - Population: 3,194.
- 1835 - Franklin Society Reading Room and Library founded.
- 1839
  - October 2: Fire.
  - Barton Academy construction completed.
- 1840
  - St. Francis Street Methodist Church founded.
  - Population: 12,672.
- 1842 - United States Marine Hospital completed.
- 1844 - Shaarai Shomayim congregation formed.
- 1845 - Trinity Episcopal Church established.
- 1850
  - Mobile Evening News begins publication.
  - Population: 20,515.
  - Bienville Square (city park) established.
- 1852
  - Public schooling begins in Barton Academy building.
  - Mobile and Ohio Railroad opened.
- 1854 - Mobile Area Chamber of Commerce chartered.
- 1855 - Publisher S.H. Goetzel in business (approximate date).
- 1857 - City Hall built.
- 1860 - Population: 29,258.
- 1861 - City becomes part of the Confederate States of America.
- 1864
  - Wilmer Hall established.
  - (August 5) Battle of Mobile Bay.
- 1865 - State colored convention held in city.
- 1868 - Africatown established near Mobile.
- 1869 - Mobile Bar Association and Mobile Law Library founded.
- 1871 - Mobile Cotton Exchange established.
- 1872 - Mobile Carnival Association established.
- 1883
  - Fidelia Club formed.
  - Drago Band (musical group) active (approximate date).
- 1889 - Mobile County Courthouse built.
- 1890
  - Mobile Camera Club founded.
  - Population: 31,076.
- 1894 - Clara Schumann Club (music group) formed.
- 1900 - Population: 38,469.

== 20th century ==
- 1902 - Mobile Public Library established.
- 1906 - (27 September) Mobile swept by a hurricane.
- 1907 - Union Depot built.
- 1910 - Population: 51,521.
- 1914 - Rotary Club of Mobile organized.
- 1918 - Alabama Dry Dock and Shipbuilding Company in business.
- 1925 - Lincoln Theatre built.
- 1927 - Saenger Theatre built.
- 1928 - Terminal Railway Alabama State Docks founded.
- 1929
  - Mobile Press newspaper begins publication.
  - Woman's Clubhouse Association founded.
- 1930 - WALA radio begins broadcasting.
- 1936 - American Association of University Women of Mobile organized.
- 1937
  - Foreign trade zone established.
  - Aluminum Ore Company refining plant constructed.
- 1940 - Population: 78,720.
- 1950 - Population: 129,009.
- 1953
  - WALA-TV (television) begins broadcasting.
  - Consular Corps of Mobile organized (approximate date).
- 1955 - WKRG-TV (television) begins broadcasting.
- 1960
  - Sister city agreement established with Puerto Barrios, Guatemala.
  - Population: 202,779.
- 1962 - Mobile Genealogical Society founded.
- 1964 - Mobile British Women's Club active (approximate date).
- 1965 - Sister city agreement established with Málaga, Spain.
- 1966 - Neighborhood Organized Workers established.
- 1974
  - Azalea City News begins publication.
  - Sister city agreement established with Pau, France.
- 1975 - Springhill Medical Center (then called Springhill Memorial Hospital) opens.
- 1976 - City twins with Worms, Germany.
- 1980
  - U.S. Supreme Court decides Mobile v. Bolden redistricting-related lawsuit.
  - Sister city agreement established with Kaohsiung, Taiwan.
- 1982 - Sister city agreement established with Zakynthos, Greece (approximate date).
- 1983 - Mobile Municipal Archives founded.
- 1985 - U.S. Naval Station Mobile opens.
- 1987 - Providence (hospital) built.
- 1988 - Sister city agreement established with Rostov on Don, Russia.
- 1989
  - Sister city agreement established with Pyeongtaek, South Korea.
  - Mike Dow becomes mayor.
- 1990 - Sister city agreement established with Katowice, Poland.
- 1992 - Sister city agreement established with Košice, Slovakia.
- 1993
  - September 22: 1993 Big Bayou Canot train wreck.
  - Sister city agreement established with Havana, Cuba, and Ichihara, Japan.
- 1995
  - City website online (approximate date).
  - Bayfest (Mobile) (music festival) begins.
- 1998 - Sammy’s v. City of Mobile strip club-related lawsuit decided.

== 21st century ==
- 2002 - Tricentennial of founding of Mobile.
- 2005
  - Sam Jones becomes first African-American in city elected mayor.
  - City twins with Cockburn, Australia, and establishes sister city agreement with Bolinao, Philippines.
- 2010 - Population: 195,111.
- 2012 - Christmas tornado outbreak.
- 2015 - Bayfest is cancelled.
- 2020 - Population: 187,041.
- 2022 - Mardi Gras resumes after twos due to the COVID-19 pandemic.

== See also ==
- History of Mobile, Alabama
- List of mayors of Mobile, Alabama
- National Register of Historic Places listings in Mobile, Alabama
- Timelines of other cities in Alabama: Birmingham, Huntsville, Montgomery, Tuscaloosa

== Bibliography ==
=== Published in the 19th century ===
- Jedidiah Morse; Richard C. Morse (1823), "Mobile", A New Universal Gazetteer (4th ed.), New Haven: S. Converse
- Alabama (1824), "An Act to alter and amend the Charter of Incorporation of the City of Mobile", Acts of Alabama
- Mobile Directory, Mobile, Alabama: H.M. McGuire and T.C. Fay, 1837, OL 22886873M
- "Mobile", The North American Tourist, New York: A.T. Goodrich, 1839
- John P. Campbell, ed. (1854). "Alabama: Mobile". Southern Business Directory. Charleston, SC: Press of Walker & James.
- "Mobile, Alabama". Ballou's Pictorial Drawing-Room Companion. 12. Boston. June 27, 1857.
- "Alabama River: Mobile". James' River Guide ... Mississippi Valley. Cincinnati: U.P. James. 1860. hdl:2027/nyp.33433081817672.
- Edward H. Hall (1866), "Mobile", Appletons' Hand-book of American Travel: the Southern Tour, New York: D. Appleton & Company
- Edward King Edward; J. Wells Champney (1875), "Mobile, the Chief City of Alabama", The Great South, Hartford, Conn: American Pub. Co.
- Saffold Berney (1878), "Mobile", Handbook of Alabama, Mobile: Mobile Register print., OL 24232267M
- "Mobile" . Encyclopædia Britannica. Vol. 16 (9th ed.). 1883.
- Land, John E. (1884). Mobile: Her Trade, Commerce and Industries, 1883-4. J.E. Land.
- Mobile: seaport and trade center; her relations to the New South. USA: Metropolitan and Star. 1888.
- Charter and code of ordinances of the city of Mobile, Mobile, Ala, 1889
- Willis G. Clark (1889). "Public School System of Mobile". History of Education in Alabama. U.S. Bureau of Education, Circular of Information. Washington DC: Government Printing Office.
- Mobile in Photo-gravure. NY. 1892.
- Peter J. Hamilton (1897), Colonial Mobile, Boston: Houghton Mifflin and Company, OCLC 3580977, OL 271548M
- "Mobile", Rand, McNally & Co.'s Handy Guide to the Southeastern States, Chicago: Rand, McNally & Co., 1899 – via Internet Archive

=== Published in the 20th century ===
- "Mobile", The United States (4th ed.), Leipzig: K. Baedeker, 1909, OCLC 02338437
- "Mobile" . Encyclopædia Britannica. Vol. 18 (11th ed.). 1910. pp. 635–636.
- Peter J. Hamilton (1912), Bicentennial Celebration ... of the Founding of Mobile, Mobile: Commercial Printing Company, OL 23365574M
- Erwin Craighead (1914), The literary history of Mobile, OCLC 5058844, OL 6576822M
- "Mobile". Automobile Blue Book. USA. 1919. Map
- Thomas McAdory Owen (1921), "Mobile", History of Alabama and Dictionary of Alabama Biography, Chicago: S.J. Clarke, OCLC 1872130
- Federal Writers' Project (1941), "Mobile", Alabama; a Guide to the Deep South, American Guide Series, New York: Hastings House, hdl:2027/uc1.b4469723
- "Mobile, Alabama's City in Motion", National Geographic Magazine, vol. 133, Washington DC, 1968
- Harriet Elizabeth Amos (1978). "All-Absorbing Topics: Food and Clothing in Confederate Mobile". Atlanta Historical Society Journal (22).
- Ory Mazar Nergal, ed. (1980), "Mobile, AL", Encyclopedia of American Cities, New York: E.P. Dutton, OL 4120668M
- Harriet Elizabeth Amos (1981). "City Belles: Images and Realities of Lives of White Women in Antebellum Mobile". Alabama Review. 34.
- Harriet Elizabeth Amos (1985). Cotton City: Urban Development in Antebellum Mobile. University of Alabama Press.
- Don Harrison Doyle (1990), New Men, New Cities, New South: Atlanta, Nashville, Charleston, Mobile, 1860-1910, Chapel Hill: University of North Carolina Press, ISBN 0807818836
- Bergeron, Arthur W. Confederate Mobile. Jackson: University Press of Mississippi, 1991.
- Higganbotham, Jay. Old Mobile: Fort Louis de la Louisiane, 1702–1711. Tuscaloosa: University of Alabama Press, 1991.
- Bruce Nelson (1993). "Organized Labor and the Struggle for Black Equality in Mobile during World War II". Journal of American History. 80 (3): 952–988. doi:10.2307/2080410. JSTOR 2080410.
- George Thomas Kurian (1994), "Mobile, Alabama", World Encyclopedia of Cities, vol. 1: North America, Santa Barbara, Calif.: ABC-CLIO, OL 1431653M – via Internet Archive (fulltext)
- "The South: Alabama: Mobile", USA, Let's Go, New York: St. Martin's Press, 1999, OL 24937240M

=== Published in the 21st century ===
- Michael Thomason (2001), Mobile: The New History of Alabama's First City, University Alabama Press, ISBN 9780817310653
- Fitzgerald, Michael W. Urban Emancipation: Popular Politics in Reconstruction Mobile, 1860–1890. Baton Rouge: Louisiana State University Press, 2002.
- Pride, Richard. The Political Use of Racial Narratives: School Desegregation in Mobile, Alabama, 1954–1997. Urbana: University of Illinois Press, 2002.
- Gregory A. Waselkov (2002). "French Colonial Archaeology at Old Mobile: An Introduction". Historical Archaeology. 36.
