= Timeline of Huntsville, Alabama =

The following is a timeline of the history of the city of Huntsville, Alabama, USA.

== Prior to 20th century ==
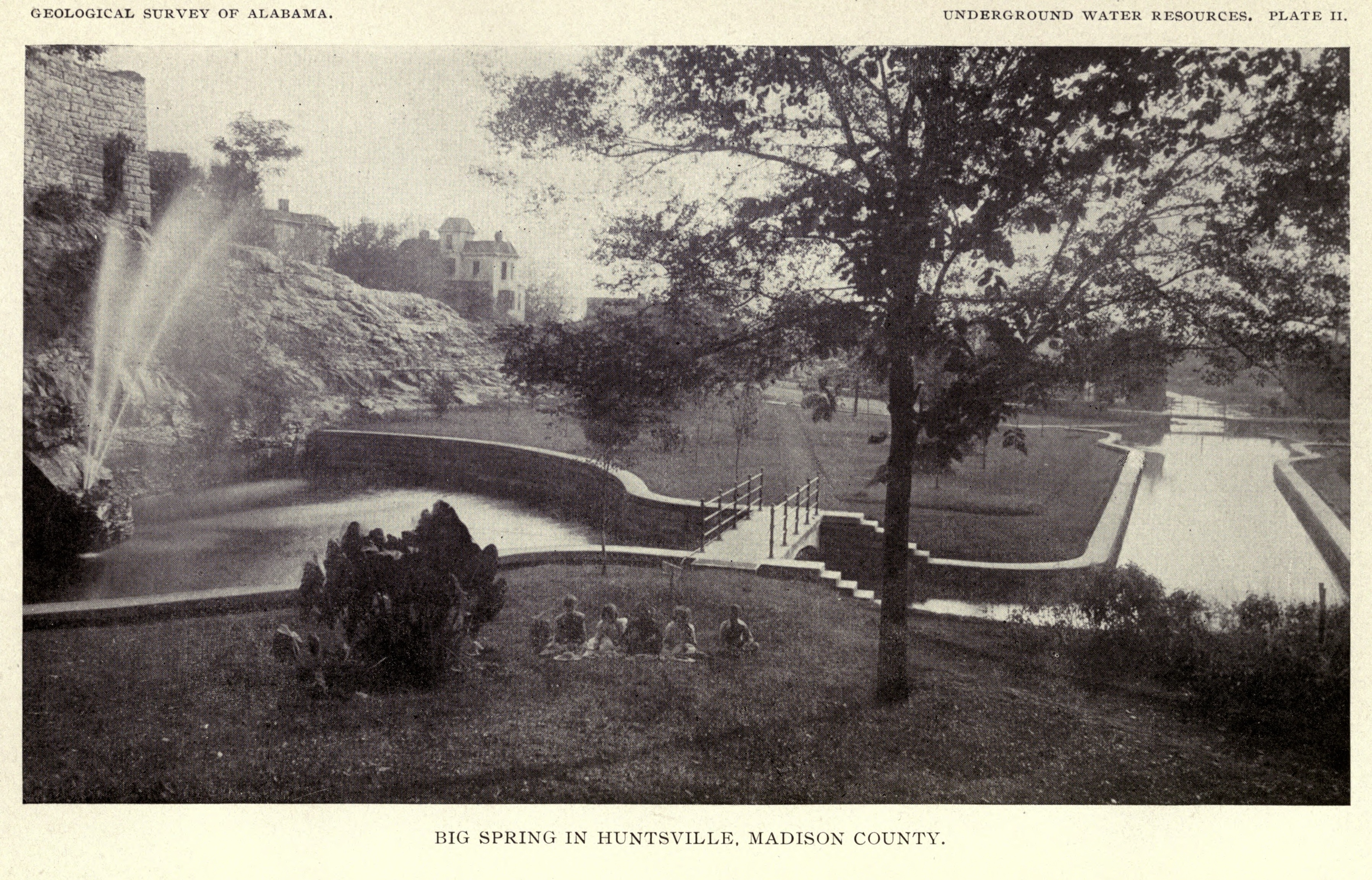
Big Spring, Huntsville, Madison County, Alabama (1907)

- 1808 - Madison County, Mississippi Territory organized by the Mississippi territorial legislature.
- 1809 - Town of Twickenham incorporated in U.S. Mississippi Territory.
- 1811 - Twickenham renamed "Huntsville".
- 1812 - Green Academy established.
- 1817
  - Town becomes part of U.S. Alabama Territory.
  - Huntsville Republican newspaper in publication.
- 1818 - Huntsville social library active.
- 1819
  - Alabama Territory constitutional convention held in Huntsville.
  - Town becomes part of new U.S. state of Alabama.
  - Newly formed Alabama Legislature convenes in Huntsville.
- 1820 - Alabama state capital relocated from Huntsville to Cahaba.
- 1822 - Maple Hill Cemetery in use (approximate date).
- 1825 - Southern Advocate and Huntsville Advertiser newspaper in publication.
- 1827 - Suspected arson destroys post office and land records at surveyor general's office.
- 1835 - A large fire near the Courthouse Square destroys about a dozen buildings.
- 1840 - Population: 2,496.
- 1844 - Huntsville was chartered as a city.
- 1855 - Memphis and Charleston Railroad begins operating.
- 1860 - Huntsville Depot built.
- 1862 - Huntsville occupied by Union forces during the American Civil War.
- 1870 - Population: 4,907.
- 1888
  - Old Federal Square U.S. Post Office and Courts built on corner of Randolph St and Green St
  - Monte Sano Railroad Workers' House built.
- 1896 - Oakwood College founded.
- 1898 - B’nai Israel Synagogue built.
- 1900 - Population: 8,068.

== 20th century ==
- 1904 - An angry mob sets fire to the city jail during the lead up to the Lynching of Horace Maples.
- 1910 - Huntsville Daily Times newspaper begins publication.
- 1912 - Lyric Theatre in business.
- 1916 - Carnegie Public Library building opens.
- 1932 - United States Courthouse and Post Office built.
- 1935 - Monte Sano State Park established near city.
- 1937 - WBHP radio begins broadcasting.
- 1938 - Wheeler National Wildlife Refuge established in vicinity of Huntsville.
- 1941 - U.S. military Redstone Arsenal begins operating.
- 1943 - (August) Community Chest, later to become United Way of Madison County, founded by community leaders
- 1947 - Keller (automobile) production begins.
- 1950
  - Area of city: 4 square miles.
  - Population: 16,437.
- 1951 - Huntsville-Madison County Historical Society formed.
- 1955
  - Huntsville Symphony Orchestra formed.
  - Memorial Parkway is constructed as a bypass around downtown.
- 1957 - Lee High School built.
- 1959 - WAFG-TV (television) begins broadcasting.
- 1960
  - U.S. NASA Marshall Space Flight Center established.
  - Area of city: 51 square miles.
  - Population: 72,365.
- 1962 - Arts Council formed.
- 1964 - Huntsville News begins publication.
- 1968 - Joe W. Davis becomes mayor.
- 1969 - Virgil I. Grissom High School established.
- 1970 - Population: 139,282.
- 1974 - Oakwood Adventist Academy established.
- 1975
  - Von Braun Civic Center (convention centre) opens.
  - Madison County Nature Trail established.
- 1976 - Huntsville Depot museum established.
- 1982
  - Panoply Arts Festival begins.
  - Alabama Constitution Village museum established.
- 1984 - Madison Square Mall in business.
- 1986 - Interstate 565 highway construction starts.
- 1988 - Steve Hettinger becomes mayor.
- 1989 - November 1989 tornado outbreak.
- 1990 - Population: 159,880.
- 1993 - Big Spring Jam (music festival) begins.
- 1995 - May 18: Anderson Hills tornado.
- 1996
  - Loretta Spencer becomes mayor.
  - Huntsville News ceases publication.
- 1997 - United States Army Aviation and Missile Command headquartered in Huntsville.

== 21st century ==
- 2006 - November 20: 2006 Huntsville bus crash.
- 2008 - Tommy Battle becomes mayor.
- 2010
  - February 12: 2010 University of Alabama in Huntsville shooting.
  - Population: 180,105.
- 2014
  - Area of city: 210 square miles.
  - Twickenham Square shopping/residential complex built.
  - Restore our Roads initiative created to fund a large amount of infrastructure projects to handle projected growth.
- 2018 - A Huntsville police officer, William Darby, shoots and kills a suicidal man seconds after arriving at the scene. The city council votes to pay the officer's legal defense. Cleared of wrong-doing by the police review board, Darby is convicted of murder. The mayor and police chief continued to support the officer after the guilt verdict.
- 2020
  - Construction begins on the next segment of the Northern Bypass, connecting Interstate 565 to US 231/431.
  - A George Floyd protest on June 3, 2020, was ended by Huntsville Police along with SWAT and Incident Response Team using tear gas, pepper spray, and rubber bullets.

== See also ==
- Huntsville, Alabama history
- List of mayors of Huntsville, Alabama
- National Register of Historic Places listings in Huntsville, Alabama
- Timelines of other cities in Alabama: Birmingham, Mobile, Montgomery, Tuscaloosa

== Bibliography ==
- John P. Campbell, ed. (1854). "Alabama: Huntsville". Southern Business Directory. Charleston, SC: Press of Walker & James.
- R.H. Long (1863), "Huntsville", Hunt's Gazetteer of the Border and Southern States, Pittsburgh, Pa.: John P. Hunt
- Saffold Berney (1878), "Huntsville", Handbook of Alabama, Mobile: Mobile Register print.
- "Huntsville", Northern Alabama, Birmingham, Ala: Smith & De Land, 1888, OCLC 4215188 – via Internet Archive
- "Huntsville" . Encyclopædia Britannica. Vol. 13 (11th ed.). 1910. p. 955.
- Edward Chambers Betts (1916). Early History of Huntsville, Alabama, 1804-1870. Brown Printing Company.
- Thomas McAdory Owen (1921). "Huntsville". History of Alabama and Dictionary of Alabama Biography. Vol. 1. S. J. Clarke Publishing Company. hdl:2027/mdp.39015078279430.
- Federal Writers' Project (1941), "Huntsville", Alabama; a Guide to the Deep South, American Guide Series, New York: Hastings House, hdl:2027/uc1.b4469723 – via HathiTrust
- Huntsville Historical Review, Huntsville-Madison County Historical Society, ISSN 1048-3152 1971-
- Sarah Huff Fisk (1997). Civilization Comes to Big Spring: Huntsville, Alabama 1823. Pinhook.
- Lynda Brown; et al. (1998). "Chronology". Alabama History: an Annotated Bibliography. Greenwood Press. ISBN 978-0-313-28223-2.
- Trimble (2004). "Early Aviation in Rocket City, U.S.A.". Alabama Review. 57. ISSN 0002-4341.
- Christine Dee (2005). "Trying James Hickman: The Politics of Loyalty in a Civil War Community". Alabama Review. 58.
- Ranee G. Pruitt, ed. (2005), Eden of the South: A Chronology of Huntsville, Alabama 1805-2005, Huntsville-Madison County Public Library
- Paul T. Hellmann (2006). "Alabama: Huntsville". Historical Gazetteer of the United States. Taylor & Francis. p. 13. ISBN 1-135-94859-3.
- Whitney Adrienne Snow (2010). "Cotton Mill City: The Huntsville Textile Industry, 1880-1989". Alabama Review. 63.
- Deane K. Dayton (ed.). "Huntsville History Collection". 2011- (Local wiki)
- Huntsville. Images of America. Charleston, S.C.: Arcadia. 2013. ISBN 978-0-73859-891-8.
- The Big Picture, City of Huntsville, 2016. (City plan)
