= Timeline of Birmingham, Alabama =

The following is a timeline of the history of the city of Birmingham, Alabama, USA.

== 19th century ==
- 1871
  - Birmingham founded and incorporated.
  - Robert Henley becomes mayor.
- 1874
  - Birmingham becomes seat of Jefferson County.
  - First Colored Baptist Church founded.
  - Cholera epidemic.
  - Birmingham Iron Age newspaper in publication.
- 1880 - Population: 3,086.
- 1881 - Alabama Christian Advocate newspaper begins publication.
- 1882
  - Sloss Furnace begins operating.
  - O'Brien's Opera House opens.
- 1887 - Howard College relocated to East Lake.
- 1888 - Evening News and Birmingham Age-Herald newspapers in publication.
- 1890
  - Population: 26,178.
  - Labor Advocate newspaper begins publication.
- 1891 - Birmingham Commercial Club incorporated.
- 1893
  - Cathedral of Saint Paul completed.
  - St. Mark's School opens.
- 1895
  - Tennessee Coal, Iron and Railroad Company headquarters relocated to Birmingham.
  - Birmingham Conservatory of Music established.
- 1896 - Spencer Business College established.
- 1900 - Population: 38,415.

== 20th century ==
=== 1900s-1950s ===
- 1901 - March 25: Storm.
- 1907
  - Tennessee Coal, Iron and Railroad Company acquired by United States Steel Corporation.
  - Miles Memorial College active in nearby Fairfield.
- 1909
  - City expands to include Ensley, North Birmingham, Pratt City, Woodlawn.
  - Birmingham Terminal Station and Empire Building constructed.
- 1910 - Population: 132,685.
- 1912 - John Hand Building constructed.
- 1913 - City Federal Building constructed.
- 1916
  - October 18: 1916 Irondale earthquake.
  - Robert E. Lee Klan No.1 formed.
- 1917 - Civitan Club founded.
- 1918 - Birmingham–Southern College established.
- 1919 - Alabama Federation of Business and Professional Women's Clubs formed in Birmingham.
- 1920
  - Progressive Farmer magazine headquartered in Birmingham.
  - Population: 178,806.
- 1922 - WAPI radio begins broadcasting.
- 1923 - Traffic lights installed.
- 1924 - Avondale Sun newspaper begins publication.
- 1925 - WBRC radio begins broadcasting.
- 1927 - Alabama Theatre opens.
- 1928 - Exchange-Security Bank established.
- 1929 - Thomas Jefferson Hotel built.
- 1930
  - Southern Worker newspaper begins publication.
  - Population: 259,678.
- 1933 - Mine, Mill and Smelter Workers Union active.
- 1936
  - Local Steel Workers Organizing Committee formed.
  - Vulcan statue erected atop Red Mountain.
- 1940 - Population: 267,583.
- 1942 - Birmingham Historical Society founded.
- 1949 - WAPI-TV and WBRC-TV (television) begin broadcasting.
- 1950
  - Birmingham Post-Herald newspaper in publication.
  - Population: 326,037.
- 1955 - Birmingham Zoo established.
- 1956
  - Alabama Christian Movement for Human Rights headquartered in Birmingham.
  - Alabama Symphony Orchestra active.
- 1958 - EBSCO Industries in business.
- 1959 - West End Hills Missionary Baptist Church built.

=== 1960s-1990s ===
- 1960
  - Briarwood Presbyterian Church (later megachurch) established.
  - Eastwood Mall in business.
  - Population: 340,887.
- 1961 - First Baptist Church, Kingston built.
- 1962 - Two North Twentieth built.
- 1963
  - April 3: Birmingham campaign for civil rights begins.
  - April 16: Martin Luther King Jr. writes his "Letter from Birmingham Jail", first published in June 1963 issues of Liberation, The Christian Century, and The New Leader.
  - May: Birmingham riot of 1963.
  - September 15: 16th Street Baptist Church bombing.
  - Birmingham Botanical Gardens open.
- 1965
  - Airport Drive-In cinema opens.
  - Southern Museum of Flight established.
- 1966 - Southern Living magazine headquartered in Birmingham.
- 1969 - Birmingham Terminal Station demolished.
- 1970
  - Daniel Building constructed.
  - Population: 300,910.
- 1971 - First Alabama Bancshares headquartered in city.
- 1972 - South Central Bell Building and First National-Southern Natural Building built.
- 1975 - Birmingham Vulcans football team formed.
- 1979 - Richard Arrington, Jr. becomes mayor.
- 1980 - Population: 284,413.
- 1982
  - Community Food Bank of Central Alabama and Bama 6 cinema open.
  - Sister city agreement established with Hitachi, Japan.
- 1986

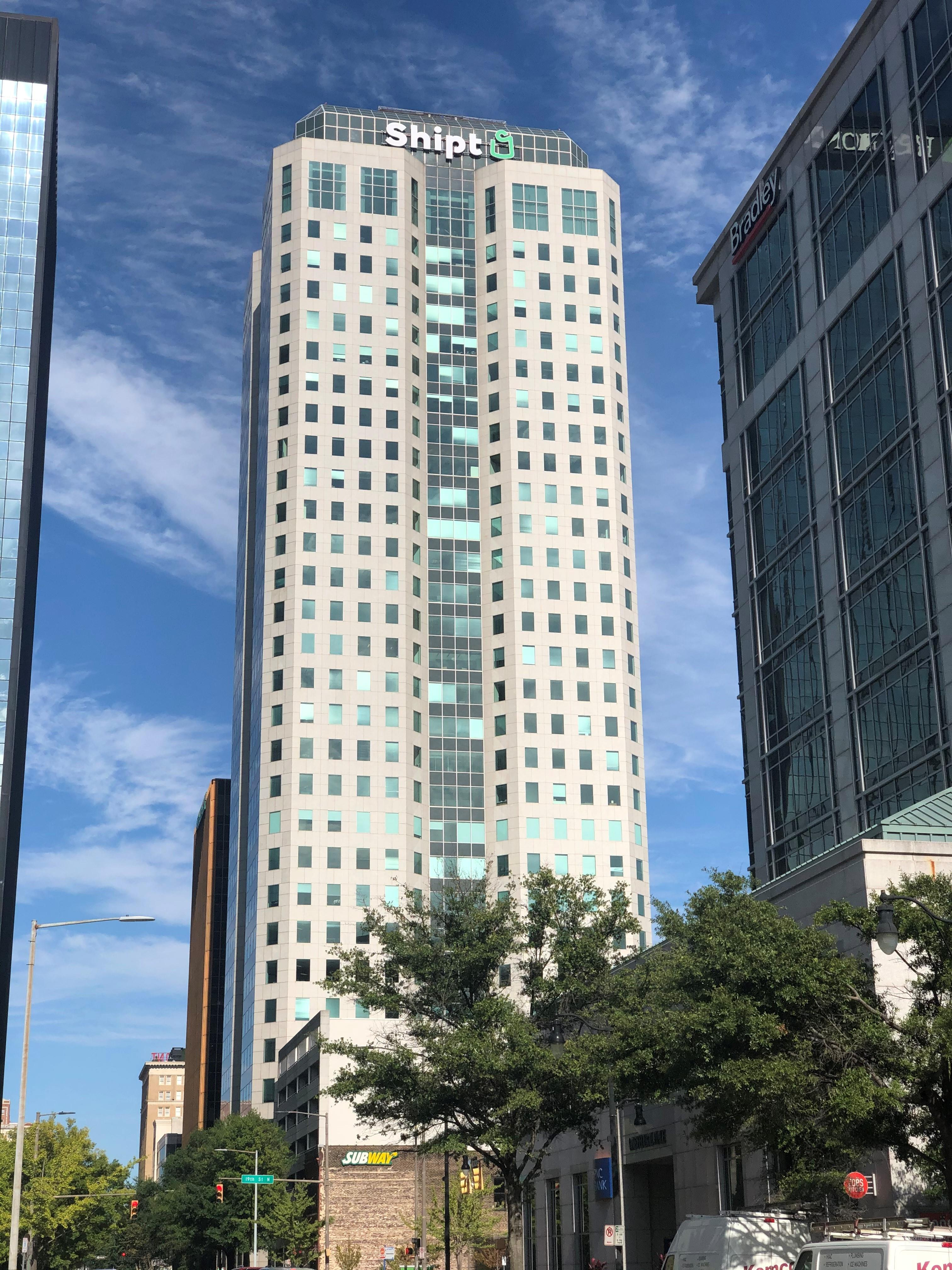
South Trust Tower, built in 1986

  - South Trust Tower built.
  - Alabama Humanities Foundation headquartered in Birmingham.
- 1988 - AmSouth-Harbert Plaza (hi-rise) built.
- 1990
  - Birmingham Islamic Society formed.
  - Population: 265,968.
- 1992 - Birmingham Civil Rights Institute established.
- 1993
  - Alabama Jazz Hall of Fame opens.
  - Spencer Bachus becomes U.S. representative for Alabama's 6th congressional district.
- 1995 - Sister city agreement established with Székesfehérvár, Hungary.
- 1996
  - City website online (approximate date).
  - Sister city agreement established with Anshan, China.
- 1997 - Sister city agreement established with Gweru, Zimbabwe.
- 1998
  - April 6–9, 1998 tornado outbreak.
  - Establishment of sister city agreement with Pomigliano d'Arco, Naples, Italy, and friendship city agreements with Chaoyang District, Beijing, China, and Maebashi, Japan.
- 1999 - Friendship city agreement established with Krasnodon, Ukraine.
- 2000 - Population: 242,840.

== 21st century ==
- 2001 - Church of the Highlands (megachurch) founded.
- 2003 - Sister city agreement established with Vinnytsia, Ukraine.

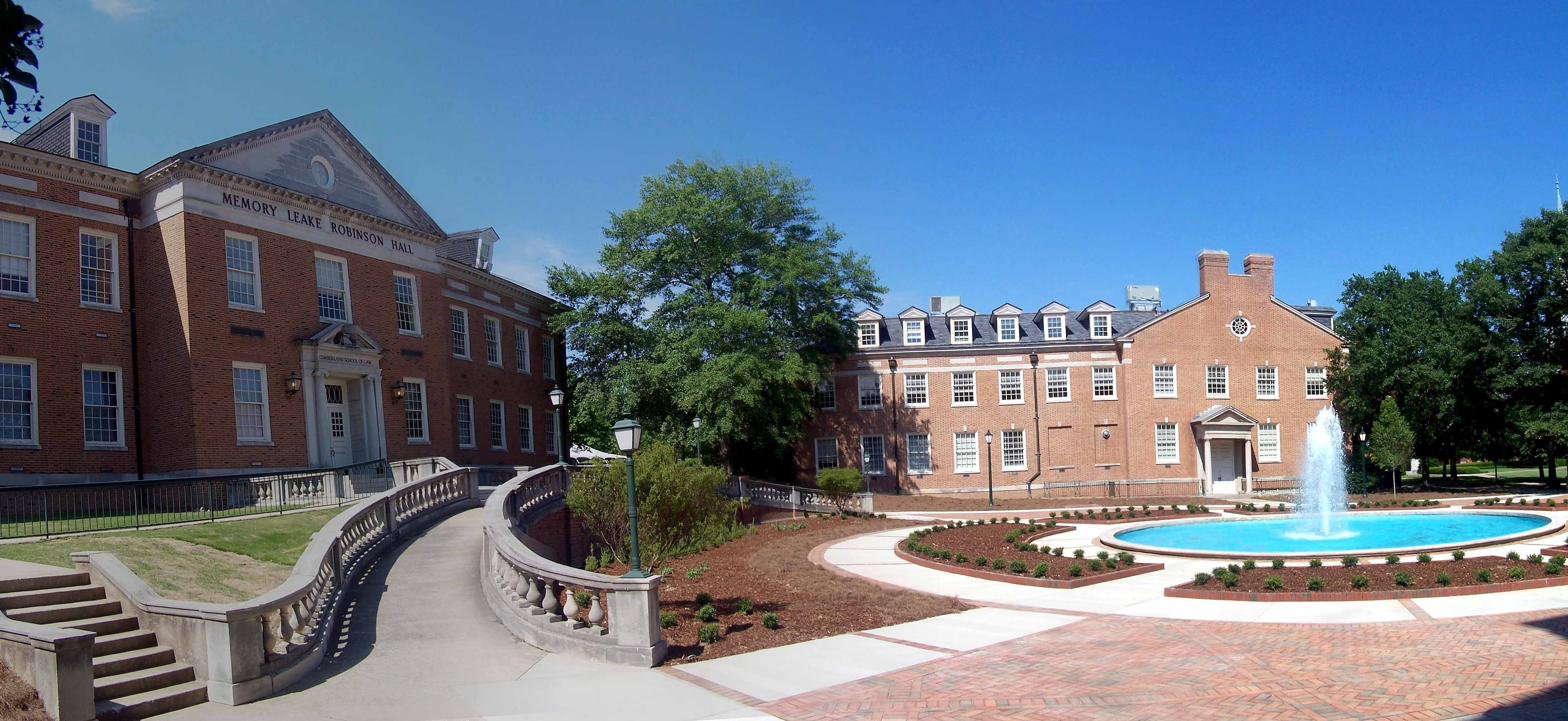
Cumberland School of Law in 2006

- 2005
  - Birmingham Post-Herald newspaper ceases publication.
  - Locust Fork News-Journal begins publication.
  - Sister city agreements established with Al-Karak, Jordan; Guédiawaye, Senegal; Plzeň, Czech Republic; and Rosh HaAyin, Israel.
- 2009 - Sister city agreement established with Winneba, Ghana.
- 2010
  - Alabama Symphony Youth Orchestra formed.
  - William A. Bell becomes mayor.
  - Population: 212,237.
- 2011 - Terri Sewell becomes U.S. representative for Alabama's 7th congressional district.
- 2015
  - Minimum wage approved in city.
  - Sister city agreement established with Liverpool, England.
- 2017 - Randall Woodfin becomes mayor.
- 2020 - Population: 200,733.
- 2021 - Birmingham Stallions football team is formed
- 2022 - 2022 World Games were hosted.
- 2024 - September 2024 Birmingham shooting: Four people are killed and seventeen others are injured during a mass shooting.

== Images ==
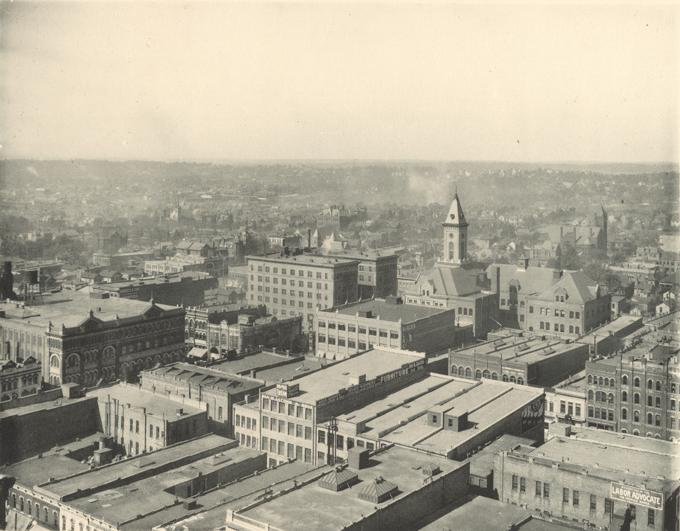
Overview of Birmingham, 1907

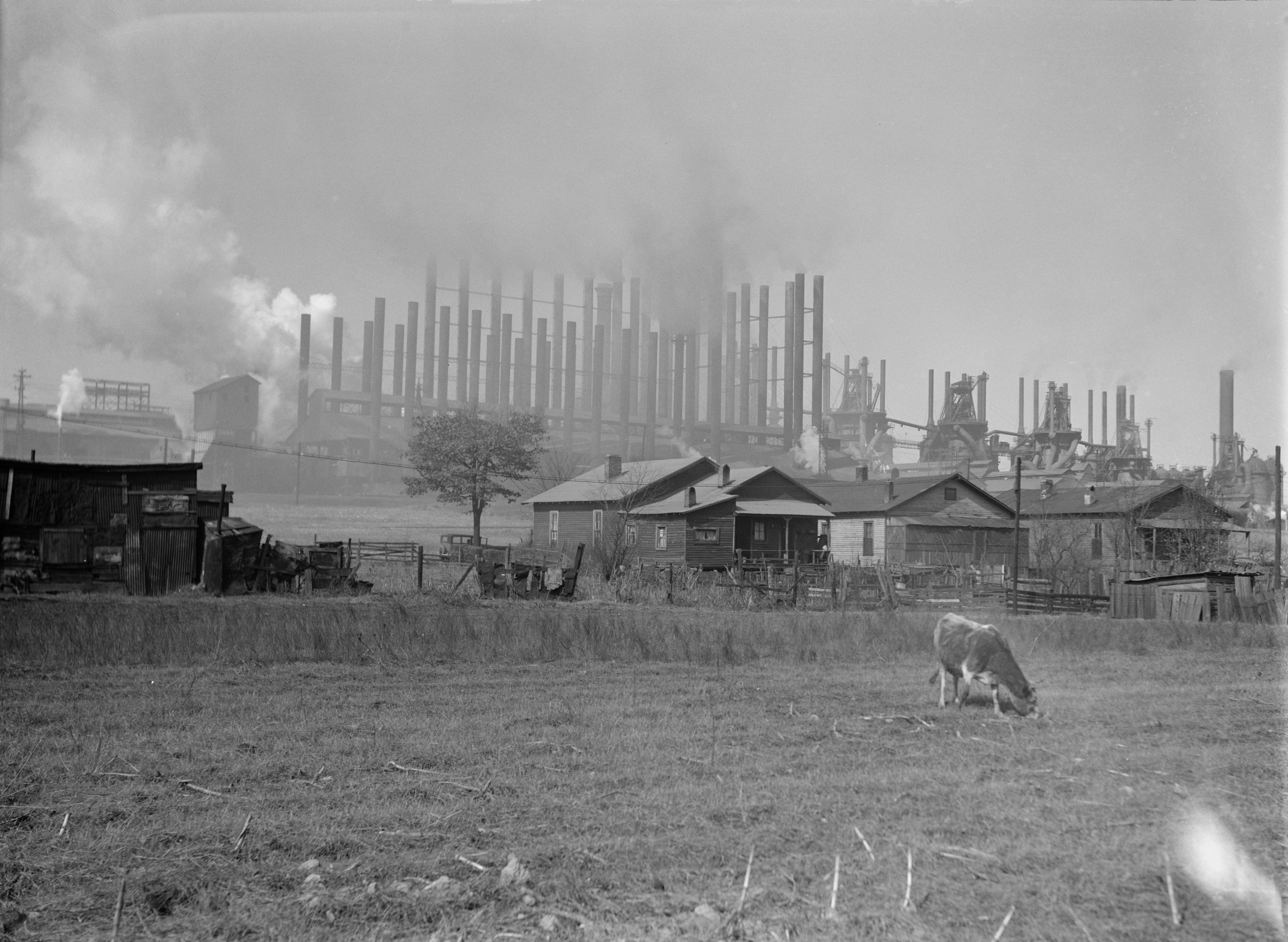
Ensley, Birmingham, 1937

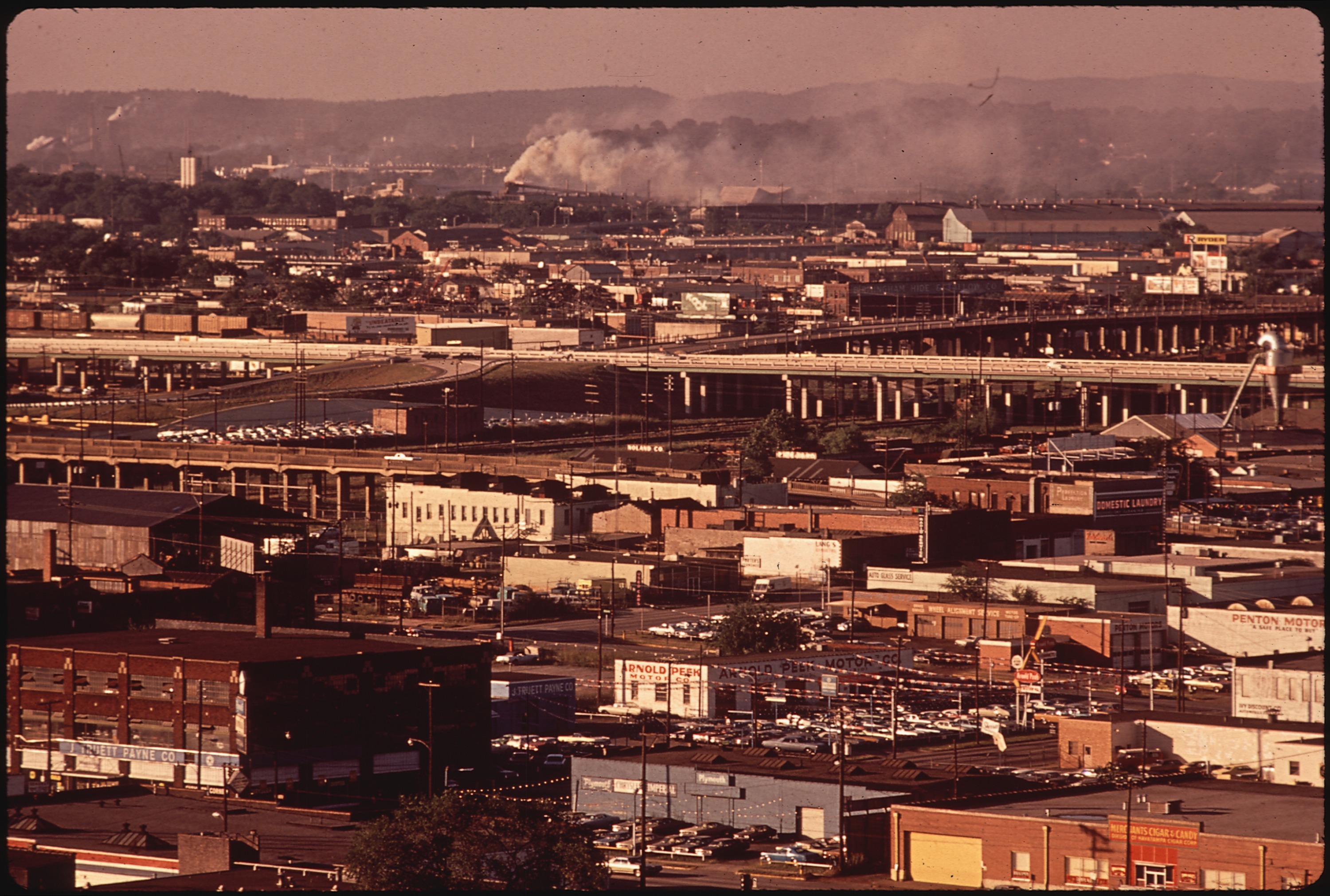
Overview of Birmingham, 1972

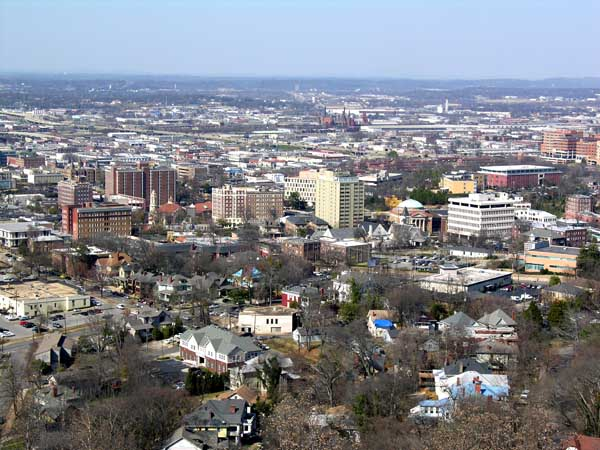
Southside, Birmingham, 2010

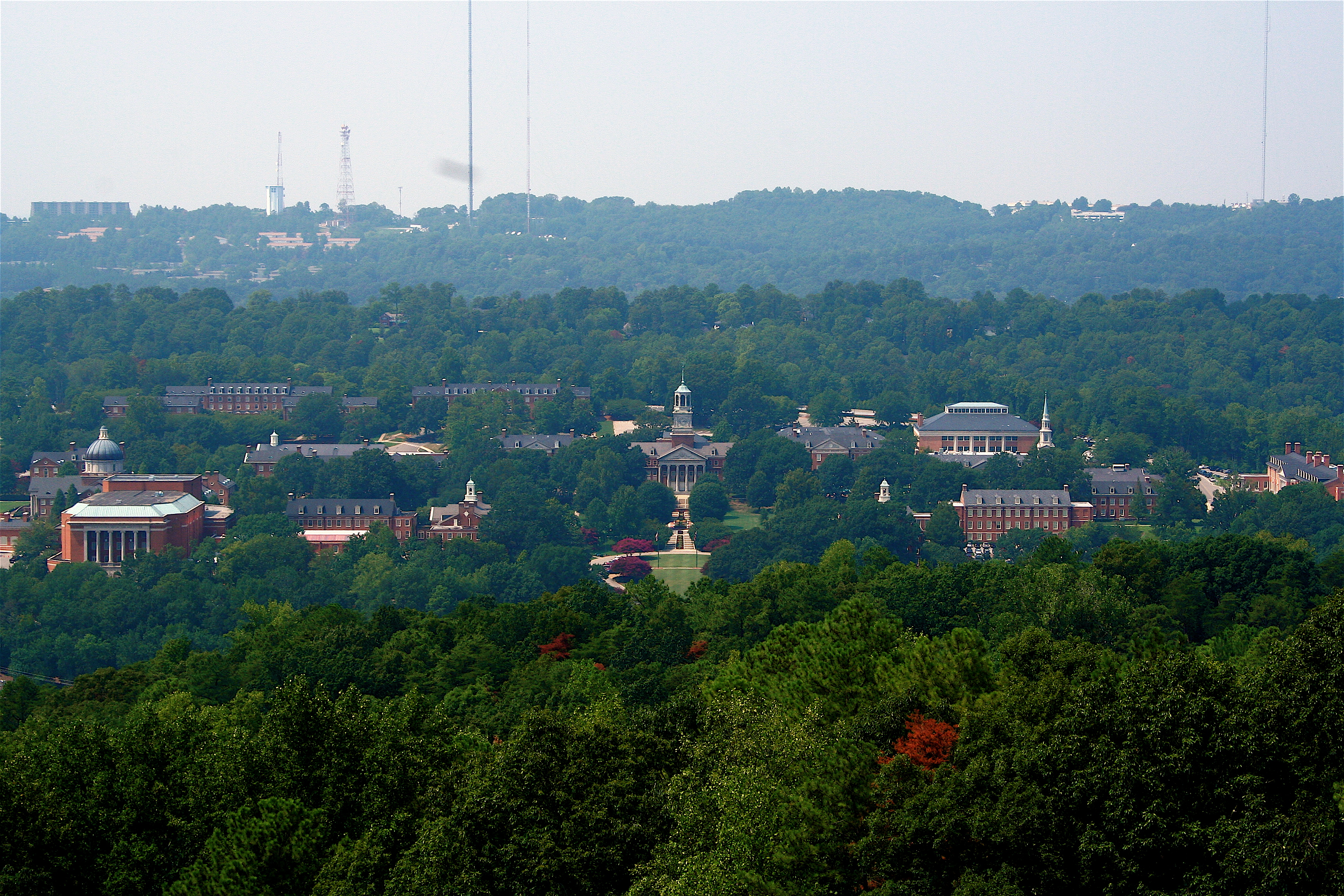
Bird's-eye view of Samford University campus

== See also ==
- History of Birmingham, Alabama
- List of mayors of Birmingham, Alabama
- National Register of Historic Places listings in Birmingham, Alabama
- List of neighborhoods in Birmingham, Alabama
- Timelines of other cities in Alabama: Huntsville, Mobile, Montgomery, Tuscaloosa

== Bibliography ==
=== Published in 19th century ===
- Saffold Berney (1878), "Birmingham", Handbook of Alabama, Mobile: Mobile Register print.
- "City Directory of Birmingham". Birmingham Directory. Atlanta, Ga.: Interstate Directory Co.: v 1884.
- John W. DuBose, ed., The Mineral Wealth of Alabama and Birmingham (Birmingham, 1886)
- 1887 Pocket Business Directory and Guide to Birmingham, Ala. 1887 – via Birmingham Public Library.
- Jefferson County and Birmingham, Alabama: Historical and Biographical. Teeple & Smith. 1887. ISBN 978-0-89308-041-9.
- Henry M. Caldwell, History of the Elyton Land Company and Birmingham, Ala. 1892.

=== Published in 20th century ===
- Code of City of Birmingham, Alabama. 1917.
- "Birmingham". Automobile Blue Book. USA. 1919.
- Cruikshank, A History of Birmingham and Its Environs (2 vols., Chicago, 1920)
- Thomas McAdory Owen (1921), "Birmingham", History of Alabama and Dictionary of Alabama Biography, Chicago: S.J. Clarke, OCLC 1872130
- Harrison A. Trexler, "Birmingham's Struggle with Commission Government," National Municipal Review, XIV (November 1925)
- George R. Leighton, "Birmingham, Alabama: The City of Perpetual Promise," Harper's Magazine, CLXXV (August 1937)
- Federal Writers' Project (1941), Alabama; a Guide to the Deep South, American Guide Series, New York: Hastings House, hdl:2027/uc1.b4469723 – via HathiTrust
- Florence H. W. Moss, Building Birmingham and Jefferson County (Birmingham, Ala.: Birmingham Printing Company, 1947)
- John C. Henley, Jr., This Is Birmingham: The Story of the Founding and Growth of an American City. 1960.
- Paul B. Worthman, "Black Workers and Labor Unions in Birmingham, Alabama, 1897-1904," Labor History, 10 (Summer 1969)
- Paul B. Worthman, "Working Class Mobility in Birmingham, Alabama, 1880-1914," in Anonymous Americans: Explorations in Nineteenth-Century Social History, ed. Tamara K. Hareven (Englewood Cliffs, 1971)
- Blaine A. Brownell (1972), "Birmingham, Alabama: New South City in the 1920s", Journal of Southern History, 38 (1): 21–48, doi:10.2307/2206652, JSTOR 2206652
- McMillan, Malcolm C. Yesterday's Birmingham. Miami: E.A. Seeman Publishing, 1975.
- Ory Mazar Nergal, ed. (1980), "Birmingham, AL", Encyclopedia of American Cities, New York: E.P. Dutton, OL 4120668M
- Robert P. Ingalls (1981), "Antiradical Violence in Birmingham During the 1930s", Journal of Southern History, 47 (4): 521–544, doi:10.2307/2207401, JSTOR 2207401
- Valley and the Hills: An Illustrated History of Birmingham and Jefferson County. 1981
- Robert J. Norrell (1986), "Caste in Steel: Jim Crow Careers in Birmingham, Alabama", Journal of American History, 73 (3): 669–694, doi:10.2307/1902982, JSTOR 1902982
- Old Birmingham, OCLC 38508791 1991-
- George Thomas Kurian (1994), "Birmingham, Alabama", World Encyclopedia of Cities, vol. 1: North America (United States A-M), Santa Barbara, Calif.: ABC-CLIO, ISBN 978-0-87436-649-5 – via Open Library
- Henry M. McKiven (1995). Iron and Steel: Class, Race, and Community in Birmingham, Alabama, 1875-1920. Univ of North Carolina Press. ISBN 978-0-8078-4524-0.
- Alan Draper (1996), "New Southern Labor History Revisited: The Success of the Mine, Mill and Smelter Workers Union in Birmingham, 1934-1938", Journal of Southern History, 62 (1): 87–108, doi:10.2307/2211207, JSTOR 2211207
- "The South: Alabama: Birmingham", USA, Let's Go, New York: St. Martin's Press, 1999, OL 24937240M
- Lynne B. Feldman, A Sense of Place: Birmingham's Black Middle Class Community, 1890-1930 (Tuscaloosa, 1999)

=== Published in 21st century ===
- "Alabama: Birmingham", Louisiana & the Deep South, Lonely Planet, 2001, ISBN 978-1-86450-216-9 – via Open Library
- American Association for State and Local History (2002). "Alabama: Birmingham". Directory of Historical Organizations in the United States and Canada (15th ed.). Rowman Altamira. ISBN 0-7591-0002-0.
- Richard Pillsbury, ed. (2006). "Birmingham". Geography. New Encyclopedia of Southern Culture. Vol. 2. University of North Carolina Press. p. 156. OCLC 910189354.
