= History of Mobile, Alabama =

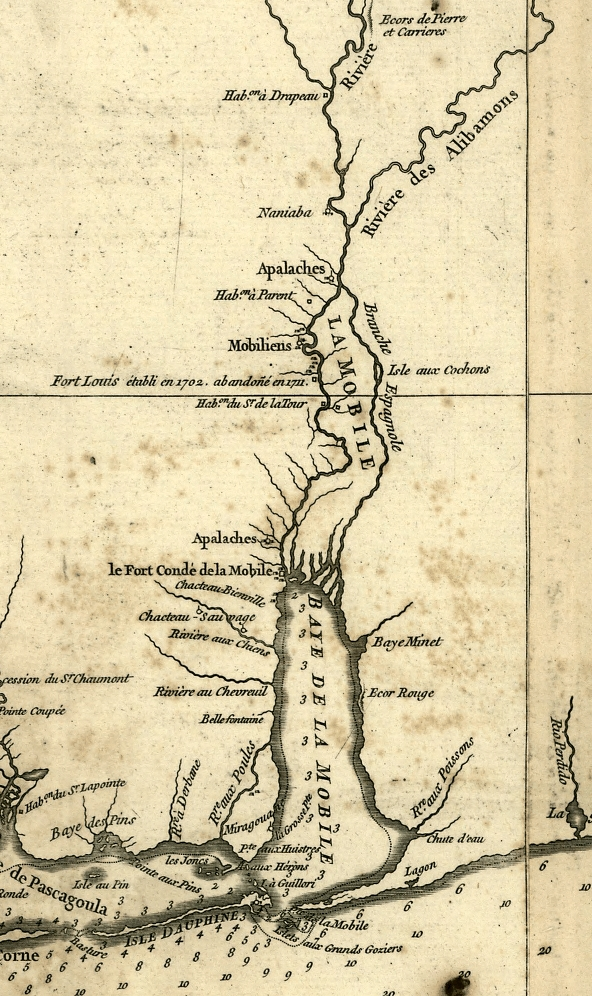
A detail of Jean Baptiste Bourguignon d'Anville's 1732 map of Louisiana showing Mobile Bay, the Mobile colony (Fort Condé de la Mobile), many rivers, bays, Native American settlements & Isle Dauphine.

Mobile was founded as the capital of colonial French Louisiana in 1702 and remained a part of New France for over 60 years. During 1720, when France warred with Spain, Mobile was on the battlefront, so the capital moved west to Biloxi. In 1763, Britain took control of the colony following their victory in the Seven Years' War. During the American Revolutionary War, the Spanish captured Mobile and retained it by the terms of the Treaty of Paris in 1783.

Mobile first became a part of the United States in 1813, when it was captured by American forces and added to the Mississippi Territory, then later re-zoned into the Alabama Territory in August 1817. Finally on December 14, 1819, Mobile became part of the new 22nd state, Alabama, one of the earlier states of the U.S. Forty-one years later, Alabama left the Union and joined the Confederate States of America in 1861. It returned in 1865 after the American Civil War. Mobile had spent decades as French, then British, then Spanish, then American, spanning 160 years, up to the Civil War.

== Conquistadors: 1519 to 1559 ==
Spanish explorers were sailing into the area of Mobile Bay as early as 1500, with the bay being marked on early Spanish maps as the Bahía del Espíritu Santo (Bay of the Holy Spirit). The area was explored in more detail in 1516 by Diego de Miruelo and in 1519 by Alonso Álvarez de Pineda. In 1528, Pánfilo de Narváez traveled through what was likely the Mobile Bay area, encountering Native Americans who fled and burned their towns at the approach of the expedition. This response was a prelude to the journeys of Hernando de Soto, more than eleven years later.

Hernando de Soto explored the area of Mobile Bay and beyond in 1540, finding the area inhabited by a Muscogee Native American people. During this expedition, his forces destroyed the fortified town of Mauvila, also spelled Maubila, from which the name Mobile was later derived. The battle with Chief Tuscaloosa and his warriors took place somewhere north of the current site of Mobile. The next large expedition was that of Tristán de Luna y Arellano, in his unsuccessful attempt to establish a permanent colony for Spain, nearby at Pensacola in 1559–1561.

== Colonial period ==
=== French Louisiana: 1702 to 1763 ===
Although Spain's presence in the area had been sporadic, the French, under Pierre Le Moyne d'Iberville from his base at Fort Maurepas, established a settlement on the Mobile River in 1702. The settlement, then known as Fort Louis de la Louisiane, was first established at Twenty-seven Mile Bluff as the first capital of the French colony of Louisiana. It was founded under the direction of d'Iberville by his brother, Jean-Baptiste Le Moyne, Sieur de Bienville, to establish control over France's Louisiana claims with Bienville having been made governor of French Louisiana in 1701. Mobile's Roman Catholic parish was established on 20 July 1703, by Jean-Baptiste de la Croix de Chevrières de Saint-Vallier, Bishop of Quebec. The parish was the first established on the Gulf Coast of the United States. The year 1704 saw the arrival of 23 women, known to history as "casquette girls" to the colony aboard the Pélican, along with yellow fever introduced to the ship in Havana. Though most of the "casquette girls" recovered, a large number of the existing colonists and the neighboring Native Americans died from the illness. This early period also saw the arrival of the first African slaves aboard a French supply ship from Saint-Domingue. The population of the colony fluctuated over the next few years, growing to 279 persons by 1708 yet descending to 178 persons two years later due to disease.

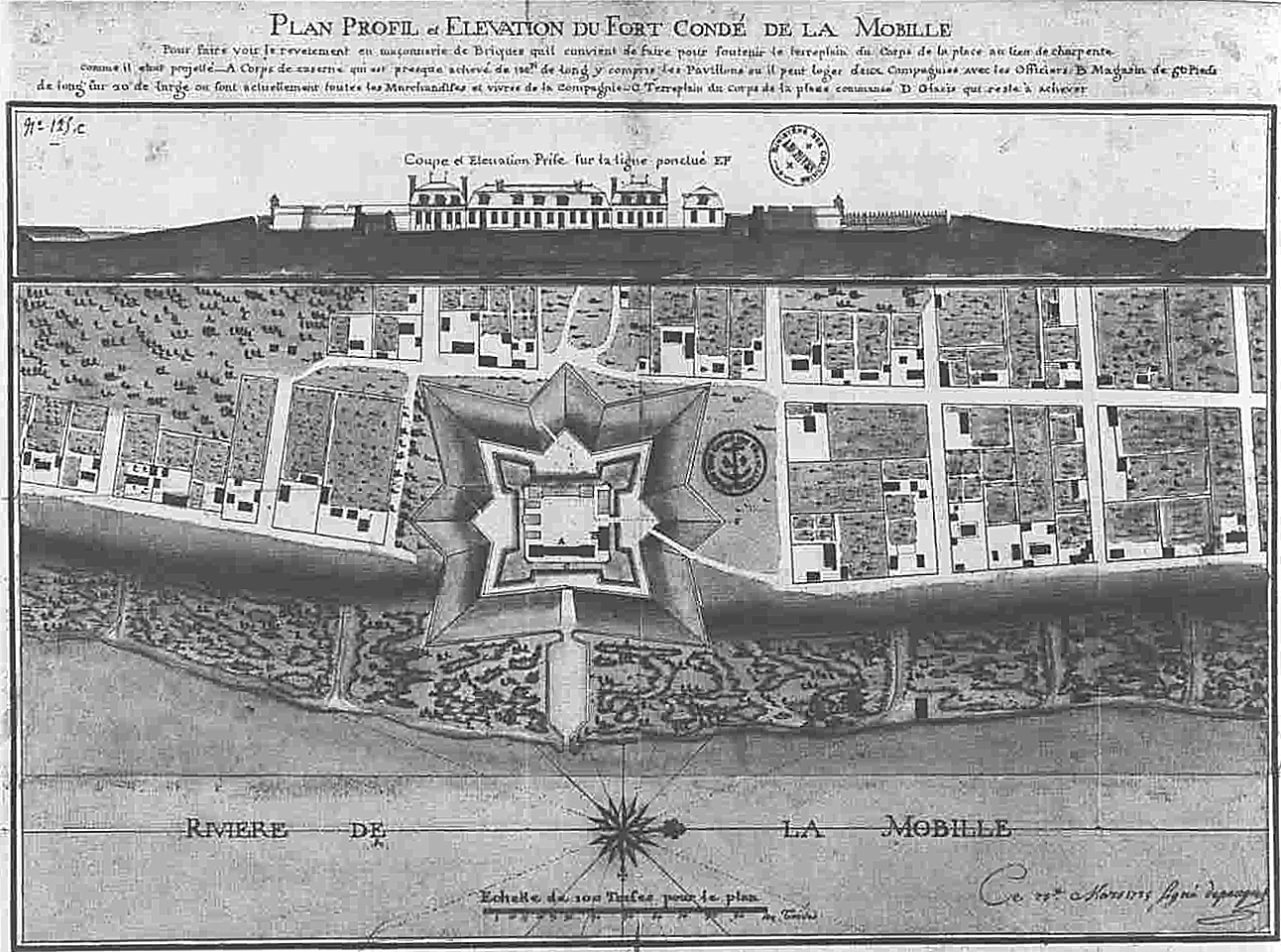
Mobile and Fort Condé in 1725.

These additional outbreaks of disease and a series of floods caused Bienville to order the town relocated several miles downriver to its present location at the confluence of the Mobile River and Mobile Bay in 1711. This site had previously been settled five years prior by Charles Rochon, Gilbert Dardenne, Pierre LeBœuf and Claude Parant. A new earth and palisade Fort Louis was constructed at the new site during this time. The colony was an economic loss, so in 1712, Antoine Crozat took over administration of the colony by royal charter for 15 years, pledging a share of profits to the King. The colony boasted a population of 400 persons. In 1713 a new governor was appointed by Crozat, Antoine Laumet de La Mothe, sieur de Cadillac, founder of Detroit. He did not last long, due to allegations of mismanagement and a lack of growth in the colony, and he was recalled to France in 1716. Bienville again took the helm as governor, serving the office for less than a year until the new governor, Jean-Michel de Lepinay, arrived from France. Lepinay, however, did not last long either, due to Crozat's relinquishing control of the colony in 1717 (after just 5 of the 15 years). The administration shifted to John Law and his Company of the Indies. Bienville found himself once again governor of Louisiana. In 1719, France warred with Spain, and Mobile was on the battlefront, so Bienville decided to move the capital to Old Biloxi, further west.

The capital of Louisiana was moved to Biloxi, (now in Mississippi) in 1720, leaving Mobile relegated to the role of military and trading outpost. In 1723 the construction of a new brick fort with a stone foundation began and it was renamed Fort Condé in honor of Louis Henri, Duc de Bourbon and prince of Condé. Mobile remained a major trade center with the Native Americans throughout the French period, leading to the almost universal use of Mobilian Jargon as the simplified trade language with the Native Americans from present-day Florida to Texas.

=== British West Florida: 1763 to 1780 ===
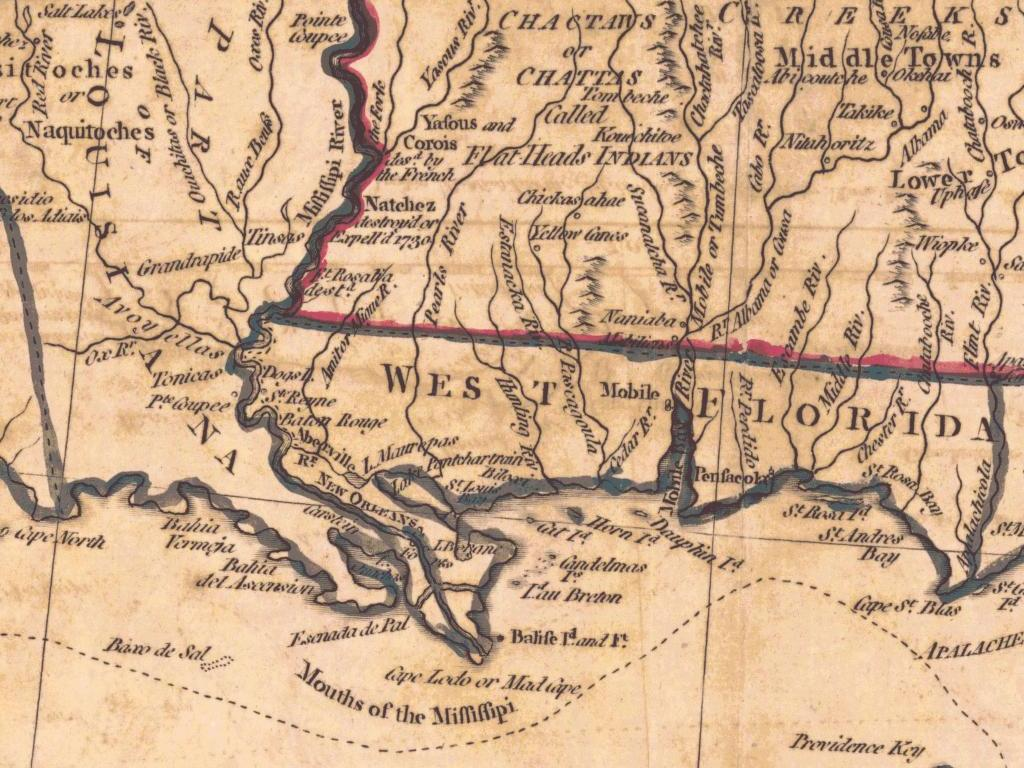
A Map of West Florida (bottom right), the U.S. (top right) and Louisiana (left), published in 1781, showing Mobile in the center of West Florida.

Mobile became a part of the "14th British colony", British West Florida, in 1763, when the Treaty of Paris was signed, ending the French and Indian War.

The treaty ceded the Mobile area to Great Britain, and under British rule the colony flourished as West Florida. The British renamed Fort Condé as Fort Charlotte after the queen consort and re-energized the port. Major exports included timber, naval stores, indigo, hides, rice, pecans, and cattle.

=== Spanish West Florida: 1780 to 1812 ===
The Spanish captured Mobile during the American Revolutionary War during the Battle of Fort Charlotte in 1780, and retained Mobile by the terms of the war-ending Treaty of Paris in 1783. Mobile was then part of the colonial province Florida Occidental for thirty years, controlled from Pensacola until 1813 when it was captured by American forces (during the War of 1812) under James Wilkinson.

=== Republic of West Florida ===
The United States and Spain held long, inconclusive negotiations on the status of West Florida. In the meantime, American settlers, including Loyalists, had established a foothold in the area and resisted Spanish control, leading to a rebellion in 1810 and the establishment for three months of the Republic of West Florida. On September 23, 1810, after meetings beginning in June, rebels overcame the Spanish garrison at Baton Rouge and unfurled the Bonnie Blue Flag. The Republic of West Florida claimed boundaries that included all territory south of the 31st parallel, west of the Perdido River, and east of the Mississippi River, not including any territory that had been part of the Louisiana Purchase.

Spain retained its control of the Mobile District for a few more years, while the United States seized the former Baton Rouge District in December 1810.

== Territorial period ==
=== Mississippi Territory ===
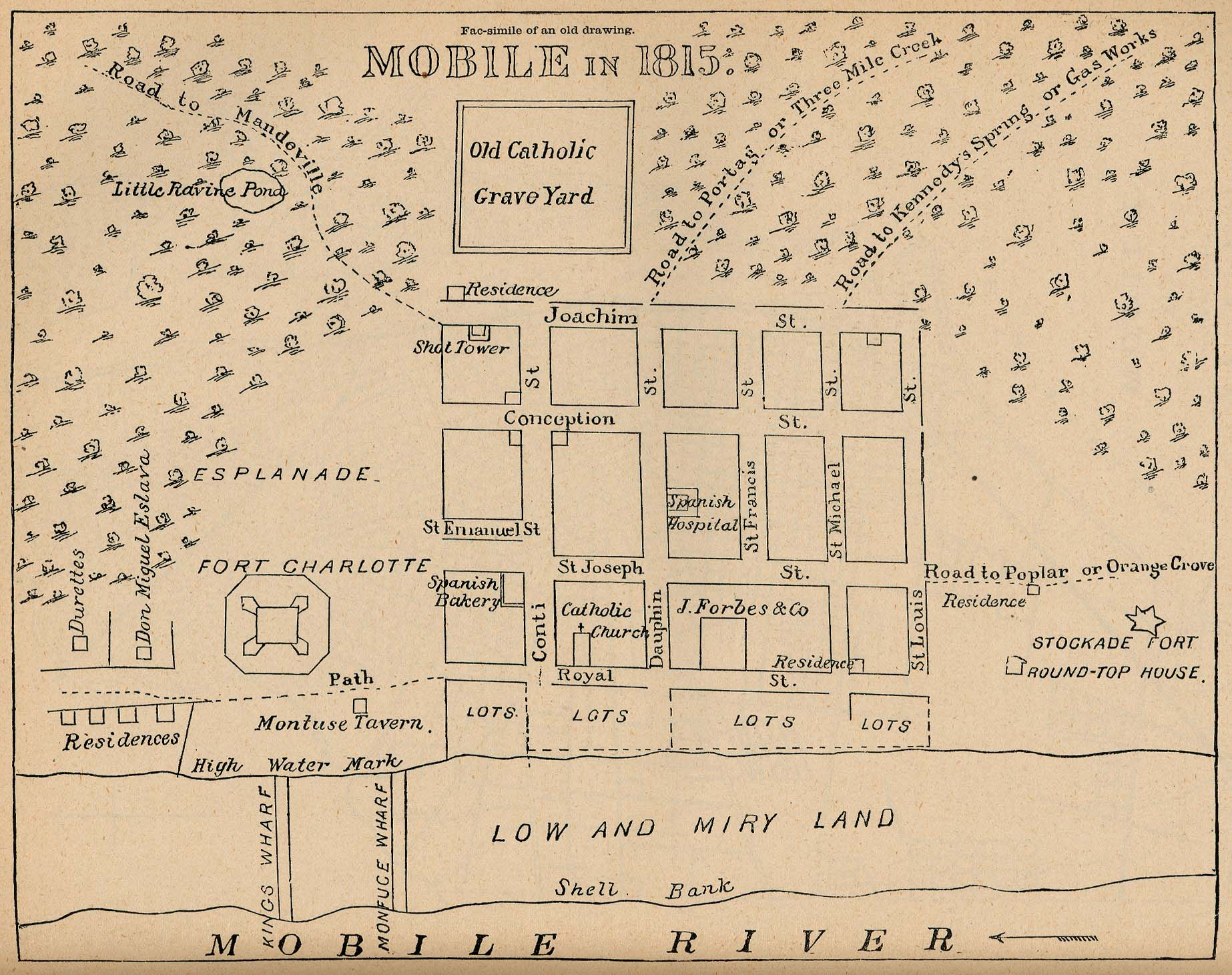
A map of Mobile in 1815.

Before the War of 1812, the Spaniards in Mobile allowed British merchants to sell arms and supplies to the Indians defend their lands against encroaching settlers who had begun to build on part of present-day Alabama. During the course of the war, General James Wilkinson took a force of American troops from New Orleans to capture Mobile. The Spanish capitulated in April 1813 and the Stars and Stripes of the United States was raised for the first time over the Mobile area as it was added to the existing Mississippi Territory.

A British attempt commanded by Captain Henry Percy in September 1814 to take Fort Bowyer on Mobile Bay was repulsed by American forces. A subsequent British attack in February 1815 was successful, resulting in the surrender of the fort. The War of 1812 ended before an attack on the settlement of Mobile, across the bay, could be conducted.

=== Alabama Territory: 1817 to 1819 ===
Within 4 years, in March 1817, the U.S. state of Mississippi was formed, splitting the Mississippi Territory in half, and leaving Mobile, for the next 2 years, as part of the new Alabama Territory. In 1819, after two years as a territory, the US state of Alabama was formed, converting the Alabama Territory into a full American state.

== After statehood ==
=== Antebellum: 1820 to 1860 ===
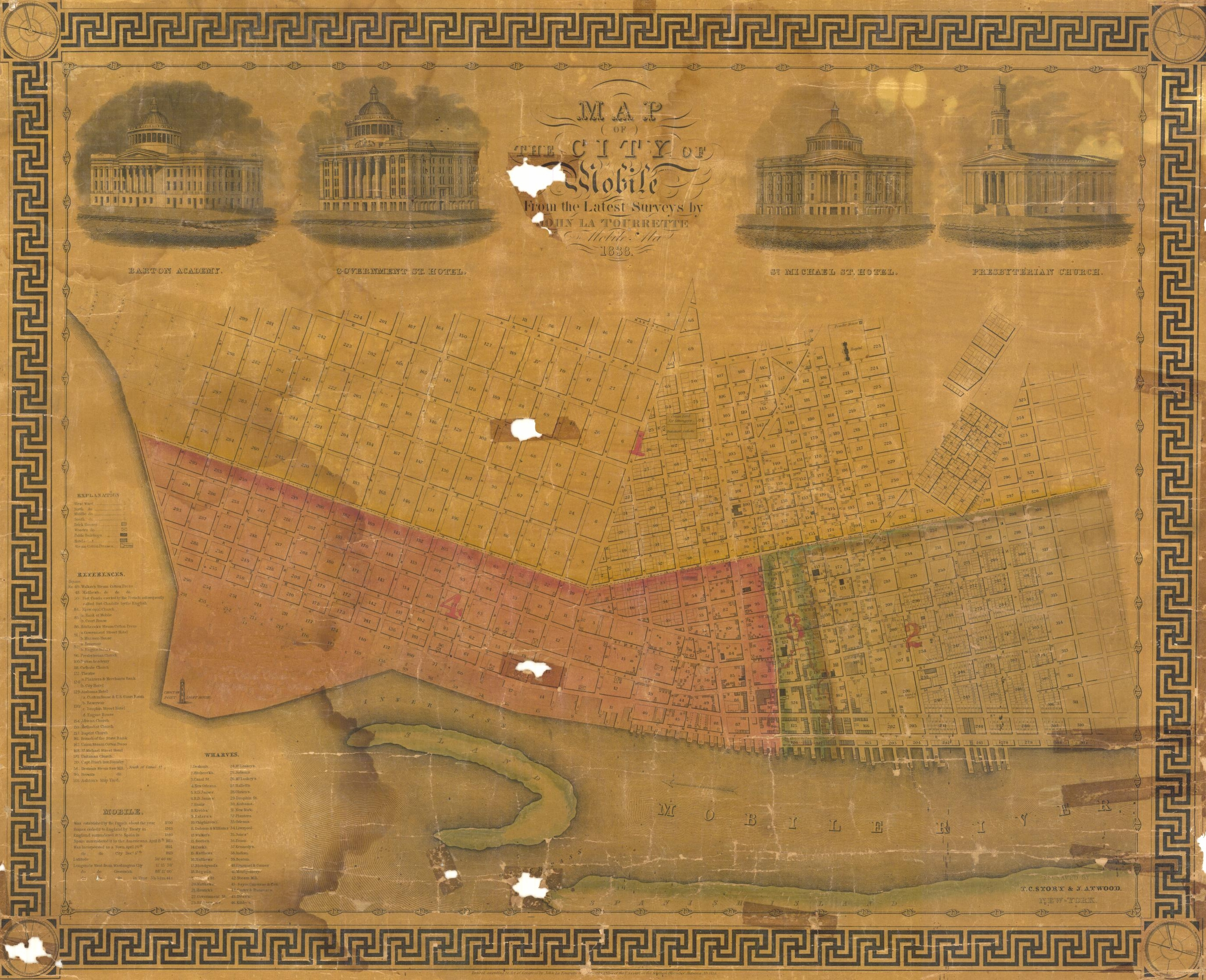
A map of Mobile in 1838.

The cotton boom of the early 19th century brought an explosion of commerce to what had been a sleepy frontier town. For almost the next half century, Mobile enjoyed prosperity as the second largest international seaport on the Gulf Coast, after New Orleans. Progress was based upon cotton, shipped downriver by flatboat or steamboat from plantation slave fields in Mississippi and Alabama. A fire in October 1827 destroyed most of the old city from the Mobile River to Saint Emanuel Street and from Saint Francis to Government Street. The city experienced another fire in 1839 that burned part of city between Conti and Government Street from Royal to Saint Emanuel Street and also both sides of Dauphin to Franklin Street. Despite these setbacks, Mobile was one of the four busiest ports in the US by the 1850s. The wealth created by this trade brought the city to a cultural high point. Mobile became known throughout the country and the world.

In another note of differentiation between the somewhat cosmopolitan port and the hinterlands of predominantly Protestant Alabama, Mobile was declared a diocese of the Roman Catholic Church in this same period. What would become known as McGill-Toolen Catholic High School was also established during this time. In 1830, Bishop Michael Portier founded Spring Hill College, one of the oldest Catholic schools in the country. Control of the college was assumed by the Jesuit Order in 1847.

In 1860, Clotilda, the last known ship to arrive in the Americas with a cargo of slaves, was abandoned by its captain near Mobile. A number of these slaves later formed their own community on the banks of the Mobile River after the American Civil War, which became known as Africatown. The inhabitants of this community retained their African customs and language well into the 20th century.

=== Civil War: 1861 to 1865 ===
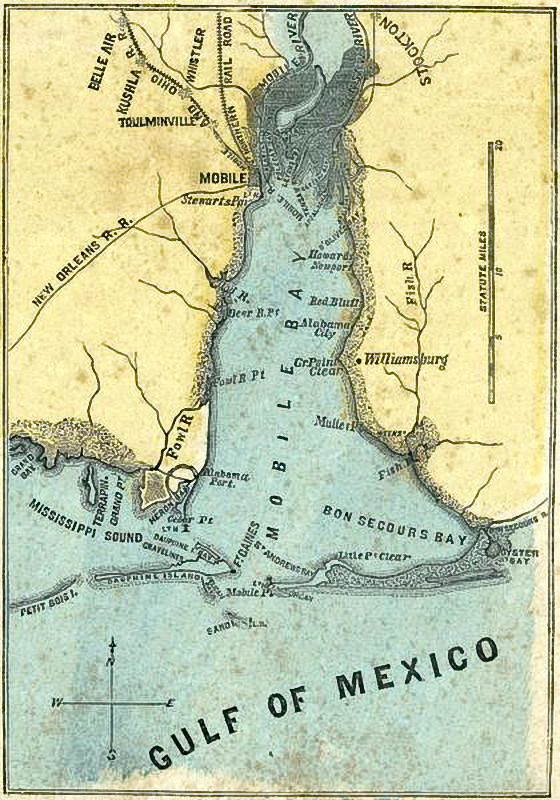
A map of Mobile Bay and surroundings during the American Civil War.

Mobile grew substantially in the period leading up to the Civil War, when the Confederates heavily fortified it. Union naval forces established a blockade under the command of Admiral David Farragut. The Confederates countered by constructing blockade-runners: fast, shallow-draft, low-slung ships that could either outrun or evade the blockaders, maintaining a trickle of trade in and out of Mobile. Also, the Hunley, the first submarine to sink an enemy vessel in combat, was built and tested in Mobile.

In August 1864 Farragut's ships fought their way past Fort Gaines and Fort Morgan guarding the mouth of Mobile Bay and defeated a small force of wooden Confederate gunboats and the ironclad CSS Tennessee, in the famous Battle of Mobile Bay. It is here that Farragut is alleged to have uttered his famous "Damn the torpedoes, full speed ahead" quote after the USS Tecumseh hit a Confederate mine and sank. The Tecumseh rests in Mobile Bay to this day. The city of Mobile later surrendered to the Union army in order to avoid destruction. Ironically, on May 25, 1865, weeks after Jefferson Davis had dissolved the Confederacy, an ammunition depot explosion, termed the great Mobile magazine explosion, killed some 300 people and destroyed a significant portion of the city.

=== Reconstruction:1865-1877 ===
The aftermath of the war left Mobile with a spirit of governmental and economic caution that would limit it for a large part of the next century. General Christopher Columbus Andrews of the United States Army was in charge of Mobile in late 1865 and early 1866, he issued an order that in all courts and judicial proceedings in the District of Mobile that African-Americans should have the same standing as whites. General Pope was put in charge of the area next. General Pope declared all offices in Mobile vacant and filled them with his own appointees, most of whom were African-American. This included appointing large numbers of African-Americans who had served in the United States Army during the war as policemen in Mobile. He declared all offices in Mobile vacant and filled them with his own appointees, most of whom were African-American. This included appointing large numbers of African-Americans who had served in the United States Army during the war as policemen in Mobile. While General Pope was in charge, Pennsylvania congressman William D. Kelley, known as a so-called "radical Republican" because he supported equal rights for African-Americans came to Mobile to give a speech. He denounced slavery as "satanic" and advocated equal rights for African-Americans, in response a lynch mob formed and a riot ensued. General Pope appointed Gustavus Horton to be the mayor of Mobile during the time until elections could be held. Horton was from Massachusetts and was considered to be a "radical" by local whites because he enforced equal rights for Mobile's African-American population. Brevet brigadier general Willard Warner was appointed as collector of customs in Mobile, serving in this position from July 1871 until February 1872. Colonel George E. Spencer of New York had been the leader of the 1st Alabama Cavalry Regiment during the war, this was a regiment of roughly 2,000 white Southern Unionists during the war who fought alongside of General William Tecumseh Sherman during his campaign in Georgia, Spencer represented Alabama in the Senate as a Republican from 1868 until 1879, he made numerous visits to Mobile during this time.

The last quarter of the 19th century in Mobile was a time of turmoil. The government was controlled by Republicans after Reconstruction was instituted by Congress in May 1867. Many of these politicians instituted policies that caused the disenfranchised Democrats to become embittered. In 1874, Democrats around the state used violence and extreme measures to keep African Americans and non-Democratic voters from participating in the November election. Election day in Mobile saw armed gangs roaming the streets and mobs of people surrounding the polling places to scare any non-Democrats away.

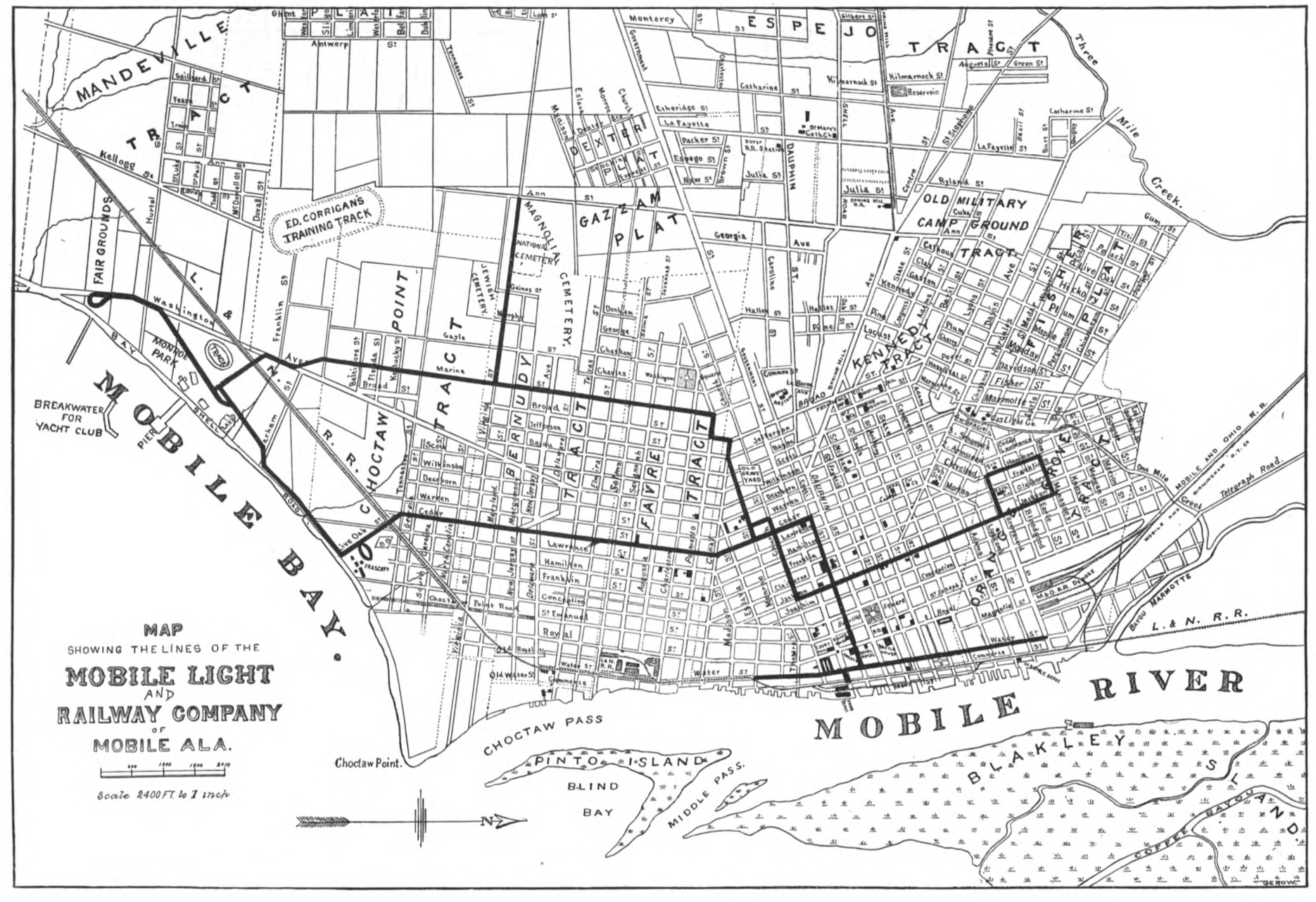
Mobile Light and Railway Company c 1894

The decline of the city continued under the Democrats. By 1875 the city was more than $5 million in debt and could not even pay the interest on the loans. This debt had been accruing since the 1830s. A game of political maneuvering continued to be played between rival factions as the city bordered on bankruptcy. In 1879 the city charter was repealed by the state legislature, abolishing the "City of Mobile" and replacing it with three city commissioners appointed by the Alabama governor. The commissioners were charged with governing the new "Port of Mobile" and reducing the city's debt. The debt problem would not be settled until the last note was paid in 1906.

== Modern period ==
=== Early 20th century: 1900 to 1949 ===
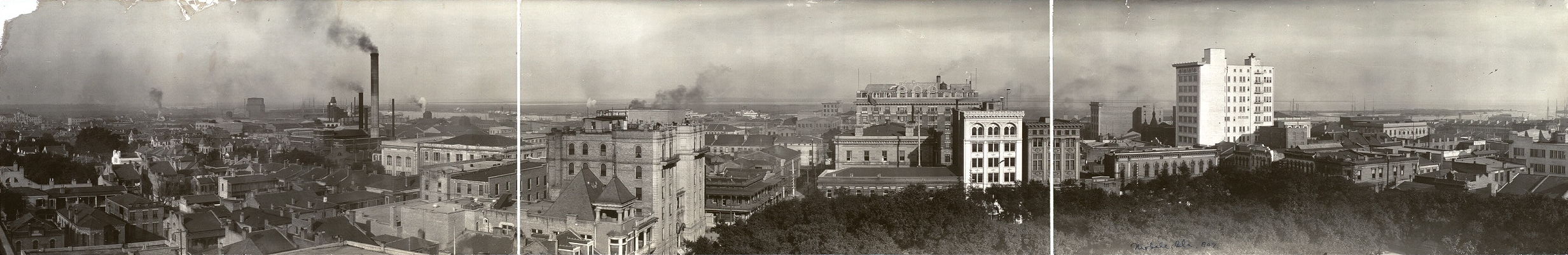
The Mobile skyline in 1909.

Overall, the early 20th century was a time of significant growth and change for Mobile, Alabama, as the city expanded economically, culturally, and socially. The population grew from about 40,000 in 1900 to over 60,000 by 1920. The city becoming a hub for shipping, manufacturing, and commerce. Key industries included lumber, textiles, shipbuilding and steel. The city received $3 million in federal grants for harbor improvements, which drastically deepened the shipping channels in the harbor. The construction of new railroads and the expansion of the port allowed for greater connectivity and facilitated the growth of the city's economy as a hub for the region. New public schools were built especially to meet the soaring demand for a high school education. High society promoted the new Mobile Symphony Orchestra and the Saenger Theatre.

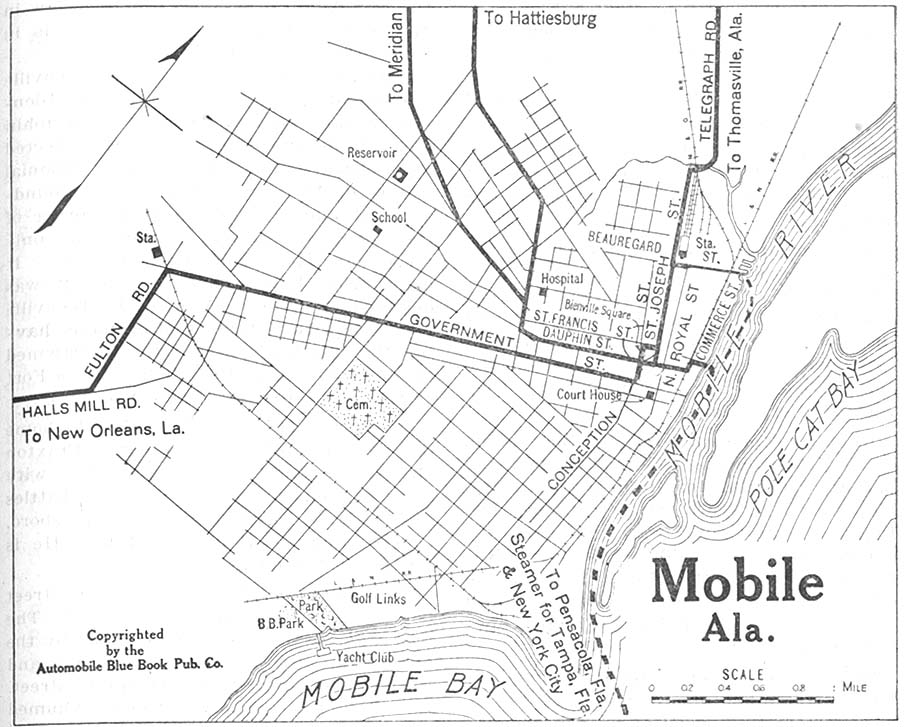
Map of Mobile in 1919

Racial tensions remained high. In 1902 the city government passed Mobile's first segregation ordinance, one that segregated the city streetcars. Mobile's African American population responded to this with a two-month boycott which was ultimately unsuccessful. After this, Mobile's de facto segregation was increasingly replaced with legislated segregation. John L. LeFlore emerged as a leader of African Americans in the 1920s.

The economy flourished in the 1920s, but suffered severely in the Great Depression after 1929. The 1920s and 1930s saw Jazz music achieve wide popularity inside and outside the Black community. Many clubs and venues gave people an opportunity to hear live music. Mardi Gras continued to be an important part of the city's culture, with elaborate parades and celebrations. However, the 1920s and 1930s were also a challenging time for Mobile and the rest of the country. The Great Depression hit the city hard, leading to high levels of unemployment and poverty. The city also experienced racial tensions, with segregation and discrimination affecting many aspects of daily life.

==== World War II ====
Mobile had $522 million in contracts for World War II combat equipment, but not nearly enough residents to do the work. Workers flocked in from rural areas, especially to the shipyards and to the Brookley Army Air Field. Between 1940 and 1943, over 89,000 people moved into Mobile to work for war effort industries. Mobile was one of eighteen U.S. cities producing Liberty ships at its Alabama Drydock and Shipbuilding Company to support the war effort by producing ships faster than the German U-boats could sink them. Gulf Shipbuilding Corporation, a subsidiary of Waterman Steamship Corporation, focused on building freighters, Fletcher-class destroyers, and minesweepers. the Gulf Coast Air Depot was responsible for overhauling and repairing military aircraft. It employed over 15,000 workers at its peak. The Air Force bought the municipal airport, Bates Field, and there developed the Brookley Army Air Field, later to become the Brookley Air Force Base. Brookley quickly became the area's largest employer. In the mid-1960s the Air Force Base was closed due to a Department of Defense "base realignment" and the airport returned to the city. Today, it is an aerospace and industrial site known as the Brookley Aeroplex.

During the war, the phenomenal influx of workers created a huge housing shortage. Citizens rented out extra rooms and also converted porches, garages and even chicken coops into rentals. Several federal housing projects were quickly built to house the new maritime and Air Force workers. Several of these are still to be found, notably the community of Birdville. "Thomas James Place" was the proper name for Birdville which was built just outside Brookley Air Force Base to provide relief for the housing shortage. The development consisted of a series of interwoven curving concrete streets named after various birds, hence the nickname Birdville.

=== Late 20th century: 1950 to 1999 ===
By 1956, Mobile's square mileage had tripled to accommodate growth. The Brookley Air Force Base closure in the mid-1960s sent economic tremors through the area which took many years to absorb. Also in the post-war period, the pulp and paper industry became a major industry in Mobile. Scott Paper Company and International Paper combined to become one of the area's largest workforces.

Legal racial segregation was ended by congressional passage of the Civil Rights Act of 1964. Mobile had been more tolerant and racially accommodating than many other Southern cities, with the police force and one local college becoming integrated in the 1950s and the voluntary desegregation of buses and lunchcounters by 1963, but schools and many other institutions had remained segregated. In 1963, three African-American students filed a suit against the Mobile County School Board for being denied admission to Murphy High School. The federal district court ordered that they be admitted for the 1964 school year, as it had been ten years since the US Supreme Court ruling in Brown v. Board of Education (1954) that segregation in public schools was unconstitutional. In 1964, the University of South Alabama opened as an integrated college, planned as such from its inception in 1956.

Mobile's city government was changed in 1985 from three city commissioners elected at-large to a mayor and city-council form with seven members elected from single-member districts, following a court challenge by African-American residents. In Bolden v. City of Mobile the federal district court ruled that the city commission form was discriminatory in intent, with the result of substantially diluting the African-American vote. In the years after passage of the Voting Rights Act of 1965, African Americans had not been able to elect any candidates of their choice to the city commission.

Racial equality and justice continued to be an issue on the individual level in Mobile. In 1981, Michael Donald was abducted and lynched by Ku Klux Klan members on Herndon Avenue. The two perpetrators were both convicted of murder, with one sentenced to life in prison and the other sentenced to death and executed in 1997. A subsequent wrongful death lawsuit was filed by the Southern Poverty Law Center on behalf of Michael Donald's mother against the United Klans of America. The seven million dollar decision against the Klans—returned, notably, by an all-white jury—effectively put the Ku Klux Klan out of business in Alabama. A fatal police shooting of an African-American man in 1992 sparked violence and unrest in Mobile, leading to the formation of a Human Relations Commission by the city in 1994.

Hurricane Frederic, which struck the area on September 12, 1979, caused severe damage in Mobile. Many residents were without power, water, telephone and basic necessities for weeks, but only one death was recorded. Relief funding following Frederic provided an economic boom in addition to growth in the 1980s, vastly improving Mobile's overall economic picture.

Beginning in the late 1980s, the city council and mayor Mike Dow began an effort termed the "String of Pearls Initiative" to make Mobile into a competitive, urban city. Numerous new facilities and projects were built around the city; the government encouraged the restoration of hundreds of historic downtown buildings and homes. Violent crime was reduced by 50%, and the city and county leaders worked to attract new business ventures to the area. The effort continues into the present with new city government leadership.

Shipbuilding began to make a major comeback in Mobile with the founding in 1999 of Austal USA, a joint venture of Australian shipbuilder, Austal, and Bender Shipbuilding.

=== 21st century: 2000 to present ===
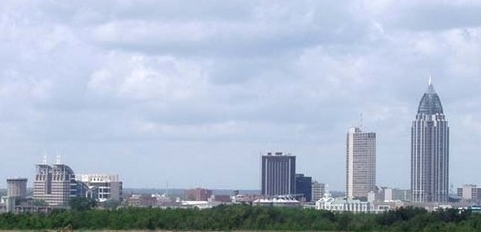
The Mobile skyline in 2007.

Mobile received moderate damage from Hurricane Ivan on 16 September 2004. Mobile received damage again from Hurricane Katrina on 29 August 2005. A storm surge of 11.45 feet (3.49 m) damaged eastern sections of Mobile and caused extensive flooding downtown. Mobilians elected their first African American mayor, Sam Jones, in September, 2005. Another landmark was added to Mobile's skyline in 2007 with the completion of the RSA Battle House Tower, the tallest skyscraper in the state. In January, 2008, the city hired EDSA, an urban design firm, to create a new comprehensive master plan for the downtown area and surrounding neighborhoods. The planning area is bordered on the east by the Mobile River, to the south by Interstate 10 and Duval Street, to the west by Houston Street and to the north by Three Mile Creek and the neighborhoods north of Martin Luther King Avenue.

== See also ==
- Timeline of Mobile, Alabama

== Bibliography ==
- Cronenberg, Allen (1995). Forth to the Mighty Conflict: Alabama and World War II. Tuscaloosa, AL: University of Alabama Press. ISBN 978-0817307370.
- Fleming, Walter (2015). Civil War and Reconstruction in Alabama. CreateSpace Independent Publishing Platform. ISBN 978-1507878446.
- Robinson, Kenneth A. (2013). Port City Crusader: John LeFlore and the Non-Partisan Voters League in Mobile, Alabama. Mod Mobilian Press. ISBN 978-0984890934.
- Rogers, William Warren; Ward, Robert David; Atkins, Leah Rawls; Flynt, Wayne (2018). Alabama: The History of a Deep South State (Bicentennial ed.). Tuscaloosa, AL: University of Alabama Press. ISBN 9780817359171.
- Thomason, Michael, ed. (2001). Mobile: the New History of Alabama's First City. Tuscaloosa, AL: University of Alabama Press. ISBN 0-8173-1065-7.

=== Further reading ===
- Bergeron, Arthur W. Jr. (2000). Confederate Mobile (Louisiana Paperback ed.). Baton Rouge: LSU Press. ISBN 0-8071-2573-3.
- Bivens, Shawn A. (200). Mobile, Alabama's People of Color: A Tricentennial History, 1702–2002, Volume One. Trafford Publishing. ISBN 978-1412002172.
- Burnett, Lonnie A. (2006). The Pen Makes a Good Sword: John Forsyth of the Mobile Register. Tuscaloosa, AL: University of Alabama Press. ISBN 9780817357603.
- Doss, Harriet E. Amos (2001). Cotton City: Urban Development in Antebellum Mobile. Tuscaloosa, AL: University of Alabama Press. ISBN 0-8173-1120-3.
- Don H., Doyle (1990). New Men, New Cities, New South: Atlanta, Nashville, Charleston, Mobile, 1860–1910. Chapel Hill, NC: University of North Carolina Press. ISBN 978-0807842706.
- Fitzgerald, Michael W. (2002). Urban Emancipation: Popular Politics in Reconstruction Mobile, 1860–1890. Baton Rouge: LSU Press. ISBN 0-8071-2837-6..
- Fitzgerald, Michael W (1993). "Railroad Subsidies and Black Aspirations: The Politics of Economic Development in Reconstruction Mobile, 1865–1879". Civil War History. 39 (3): 240–256. doi:10.1353/cwh.1993.0001.
- Gould, Elizabeth Barrett (1988). From Fort to Port: An Architectural History of Mobile, Alabama, 1711–1918. Tuscaloosa, AL: University of Alabama Press. ISBN 978-0817302566.
- Green, Hilary (2016). Educational Reconstruction: African American Schools in the Urban South, 1865–1890. New York: Fordham University Press. ISBN 978-0823270125. case studies of Richmond, Virginia, and Mobile. online review
- Higginbotham, Jay (1991). Old Mobile: Fort Louis de la Louisiane, 1702–1711 (Reprint ed.). Tuscaloosa, AL: University of Alabama Press. ISBN 978-0817305284.
- Kirkland, Scotty E. (2009). Pink Sheets and Black Ballots: Politics and Civil Rights in Mobile, Alabama, 1945–1985 (MA thesis). University of South Alabama.
- McLaurin, Melton; Thomason, Michael (1981). Mobile, the Life and Times of a Great Southern City: An Illustrated History. Windsor Publications. ISBN 978-0897810203.
- Padgett, Charles S. (2001). "'Without Hysteria or Unnecessary Disturbance': Desegregation at Spring Hill College, Mobile, Alabama, 1948–1954". History of Education Quarterly. 41 (2): 167–188. doi:10.1111/j.1748-5959.2001.tb00083.x. JSTOR 369825.
- Pride, Richard A. (2002). The Political Use of Racial Narratives: School Desegregation in Mobile, Alabama, 1954–97. Urbana, IL: University of Illinois Press. ISBN 978-0252075940.
- Roberts, L. Craig (2015). Mardi Gras in Mobile. Charleston, SC: The History Press. ISBN 978-1626197282.
- Sledge, John S. (2015). The Mobile River. Columbia, SC: University of South Carolina Press. ISBN 978-1611174854.
- Wilson, Edward O.; Harris, Alex (2012). Why We Are Here: Mobile and the Spirit of a Southern City. Liveright. ISBN 978-0871404701.

=== Older histories ===
- Mobile Directory, Mobile, Alabama: H.M. McGuire and T.C. Fay, 1837, OL 22886873M
- Saffold Berney (1878), "Mobile", Handbook of Alabama, Mobile: Mobile Register print., OL 24232267M
- Peter J. Hamilton (1912), The Mobile Bicentennial, Mobile: Commercial Printing Company, OL 23365574M
