= Timeline of Tuscaloosa, Alabama =

The following is a timeline of the history of the city of Tuscaloosa, Alabama, United States.

== 19th century ==
- 1809 - Creek people establish village on Black Warrior River.
- 1813 - Village sacked by U.S. forces under John Coffee during the Creek War.
- 1816 - Site settled by Thomas York.
- 1818 - Settlement designated seat of newly formed Tuscaloosa County, Alabama Territory.
- 1819
  - City of Tuscaloosa incorporated.
  - Tuscaloosa becomes part of the new U.S. state of Alabama.
- 1826 - Alabama state capital relocated to Tuscaloosa from Cahaba.
- 1831 - University of Alabama opens.
- 1835 - Battle–Friedman House built.
- 1837 - Independent Monitor newspaper begins publication.
- 1840 - Population: 1,949.
- 1847 - State capital relocated from Tuscaloosa to Montgomery.
- 1850 - Alabama Historical Society headquartered in Tuscaloosa.
- 1865 - Tuscaloosa besieged by Union forces during the American Civil War.
- 1900 - Population: 5,094.

== 20th century ==
- 1910 - Tuscaloosa News begins publication.
- 1913 - Belvedere Theatre in business.
- 1920 - Population: 11,996.
- 1930 - University's Center for Business and Economic Research established.
- 1933 - Moundville Archaeological Park established near Tuscaloosa.
- 1936 - WJRD radio begins broadcasting.
- 1949 - Tuscaloosa Regional Airport begins operating.
- 1950 - Population: 46,396.
- 1956 - Dale Drive-In cinema in business.
- 1963 - Racial integration of University of Alabama ordered by United States district court.
- 1964 - June 9: Police crackdown on demonstrators during the Civil Rights Movement. The incident became known as "Bloody Tuesday".
- 1966 - Tuscaloosa County Preservation Society formed.
- 1971 - Lake Tuscaloosa created.
- 1978 - Alabama State Data Center headquartered in Tuscaloosa.
- 1980 - Population: 75,211.
- 1988 - University's Paul W. Bryant Museum opens.
- 1991 - Jemison–Van de Graaff Mansion (house museum) established.
- 2000 - December 16: December 2000 Tuscaloosa tornado.

== 21st century ==
- 2003 - Artur Davis becomes U.S. representative for Alabama's 7th congressional district.
- 2005 - Walter Maddox becomes mayor.
- 2010 - Population: 90,468.
- 2011
  - April 27: 2011 Tuscaloosa–Birmingham tornado occurs.
  - Terri Sewell becomes U.S. representative for Alabama's 7th congressional district.

== See also ==
- Tuscaloosa history
- List of mayors of Tuscaloosa, Alabama
- National Register of Historic Places listings in Tuscaloosa County, Alabama
- Timelines of other cities in Alabama: Birmingham, Huntsville, Mobile, Montgomery
- List of capitals in the United States § Historical state, colonial, and territorial capitals

== Bibliography ==
- Federal Writers' Project (1941), "Tuscaloosa", Alabama; a Guide to the Deep South, American Guide Series, New York: Hastings House, pp. 243+, hdl:2027/uc1.b4469723 – via HathiTrust
- Matthew W. Clinton (1958). Tuscaloosa, Alabama: its Early Days, 1816-1865. Zonta Club.
- Historical record of Tuscaloosa, Alabama, 1819-1969, sesquicentennial souvenir program
- G. Ward Hubbs. Tuscaloosa: Portrait of an Alabama County (Northridge, California: Windsor, 1987)
- Heritage of Tuscaloosa County, Alabama. Clanton, Ala.: Heritage Publishing Consultants, 1999.
- Paul T. Hellmann (2006). "Alabama: Tuscaloosa". Historical Gazetteer of the United States. Taylor & Francis. ISBN 1-135-94859-3.
- Amalia K. Amaki; Katherine R. Mauter (2011). Tuscaloosa. Images of America. Charleston, SC: Arcadia. ISBN 9780738587882.
