= Fort Charlotte, Mobile =

Archaeological site in Alabama, United States

- Fort Condé de la Mobille (French); Fuerte Carlota de Mobila (Spanish)
- Location within Alabama Fort Charlotte (Alabama) Fort Charlotte (the United States)
- 30°41′18.5″N 88°02′24.8″W
- Location: 150 South Royal Street, Mobile, Alabama 36602

History
- Built: 1723
- Built for: Louis XV of France
- Demolished: 1820
- Rebuilt: 1976
- Event(s): French and Indian War American Revolutionary War: Battle of Fort Charlotte; War of 1812

Site notes
- Governing body: Government of Mobile
- Website: colonialmobile.com

U.S. National Register of Historic Places
- Official name: Fort Conde-Charlotte
- Designated: May 21, 1969
- Reference no.: 69000033

Fort Charlotte, Mobile (French: Fort Condé de la Mobille and Spanish: Fuerte Carlota de Mobila) is a partially-reconstructed 18th-century fort in Mobile, Alabama.

== Background ==
The ships of the original French settlers, sailing to Old Biloxi in 1699, and later transfers, were staged through Dauphin Island (south of Mobile Bay, which was not dredged for larger ships until many years later).

Mobile was founded by Jean-Baptiste Le Moyne de Bienville in 1702 as Fort Louis de la Louisiane at 27-Mile Bluff up river (27 miles [43 km] from the mouth). After the Mobile River flooded and damaged the fort, Mobile was relocated in 1711 to the current site. A temporary wooden stockade fort was constructed, also named Fort Louis after the old fort up river. In 1723, construction of a new brick fort with a stone foundation began, renamed later as Fort Condé in honor of Louis Henri de Bourbon, duc de Bourbon and prince de Condé.

The fort guarded Mobile and its citizens for almost 100 years, from 1723 to 1820. The fort had been built by the French to defend against British or Spanish attack on the strategic location of Mobile and its Bay as a port to the Gulf of Mexico, on the easternmost part of the French Louisiana colony. The strategic importance of Mobile and its fort was significant: the fort protected access into the strategic region between the Mississippi River and the Atlantic colonies along the Alabama River and Tombigbee River.

The fort and its surrounding buildings covered about 11 acres (4.5 ha) of land. It was constructed of local brick and stone, with earthen dirt walls, plus cedar wood. A crew of 20 black slaves and 5 white workmen performed original work on the fort. If the fort had been reconstructed full-size, it would cover large sections of Royal Street, Government Boulevard, Church, St. Emanuel, and Theatre Streets downtown. The Fort Conde Village neighborhood, which now includes the Conde–Charlotte House historical museum, was constructed during the 1820s and 1830s within the southern bastions of the original fort.

During 1763 to 1780, Britain was in possession of the region, and the fort was renamed in honor of Queen Charlotte, wife of King George III. From 1780 to 1813, Spain ruled the region, and the fort was renamed Fuerte Carlota. In 1813, Mobile was occupied by United States troops, and the fort was renamed again as Fort Charlotte.

In 1820, Congress authorized its sale and removal because it was no longer needed for defense. Later, city funds paid for the demolition to allow for new streets to be built eastward towards the river and southward. By late 1823, most of the above-ground traces were gone, leaving only underground structures.

A 4/5-scale replica, spanning almost 1/3 of the original fort, was opened on July 4, 1976, as part of Mobile's celebration of the United States Bicentennial.

== Design ==
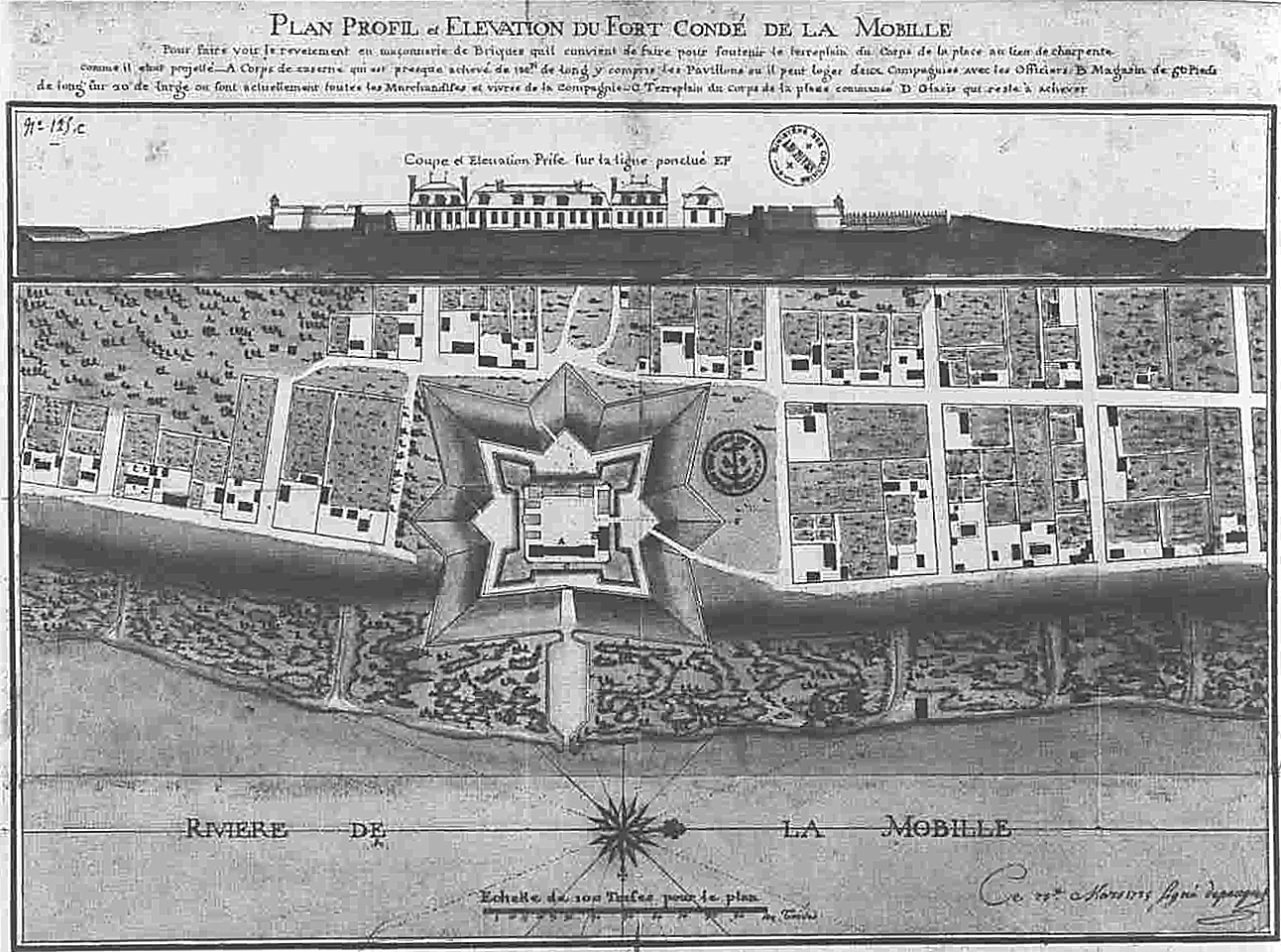
A 1725 elevation by De Pauger of Fort Condé.

The original fort, from 1723, was shaped in the form of a seven-pointed star, with guard towers raised at the points (see map image) with significant surrounding earth works. In design, it is similar to Spanish fort Castillo de San Marcos in St. Augustine, Florida.

The settlement of Mobile (French "Mobille") was aligned parallel to the Mobile River, rather than north–south, so that the fort faced somewhat northeast along an elevated bluff that was lined by "Royal Street" overlooking the marshland sloping down below. (Even in contemporary Mobile, Royal Street is at higher elevation, with the newer streets of Water Street and Commerce Street [not on 1725 map] further down the slopes towards the Mobile River).

Some buildings within the fort compound had the French mansard roof style, with dormer windows extending from each roof (see enlarged building images below, or building profiles at top of 1725 map). The tall chimneys at the ends of the buildings, shown in the map profile, were not used on the reconstructed Fort Condé. Also, the lengths of buildings were longer in the original fort, than represented in the 4/5 scale replica fort. The Mobile River is illustrated on the 1725 map with the label Riviere de la Mobille, using the spelling "Mobille."

The map was drawn by Adrien de Pauger in 1725. After Jean-Baptiste Le Moyne de Bienville moved Mobile downriver in May 1711 (following the death of his brother Pierre Le Moyne d'Iberville in 1706), he planned the next capital city (after 1718) to be on the Mississippi, in similar fashion to being on the Mobile, and so De Pauger also designed the Vieux Carré in New Orleans, which was built from 1719 to 1722.

== See also ==
- List of French forts in North America
- List of star forts
- National Register of Historic Places listings in Mobile, Alabama
