= English Turn =

Bend in the Mississippi River in south Louisiana (USA)

- River knee
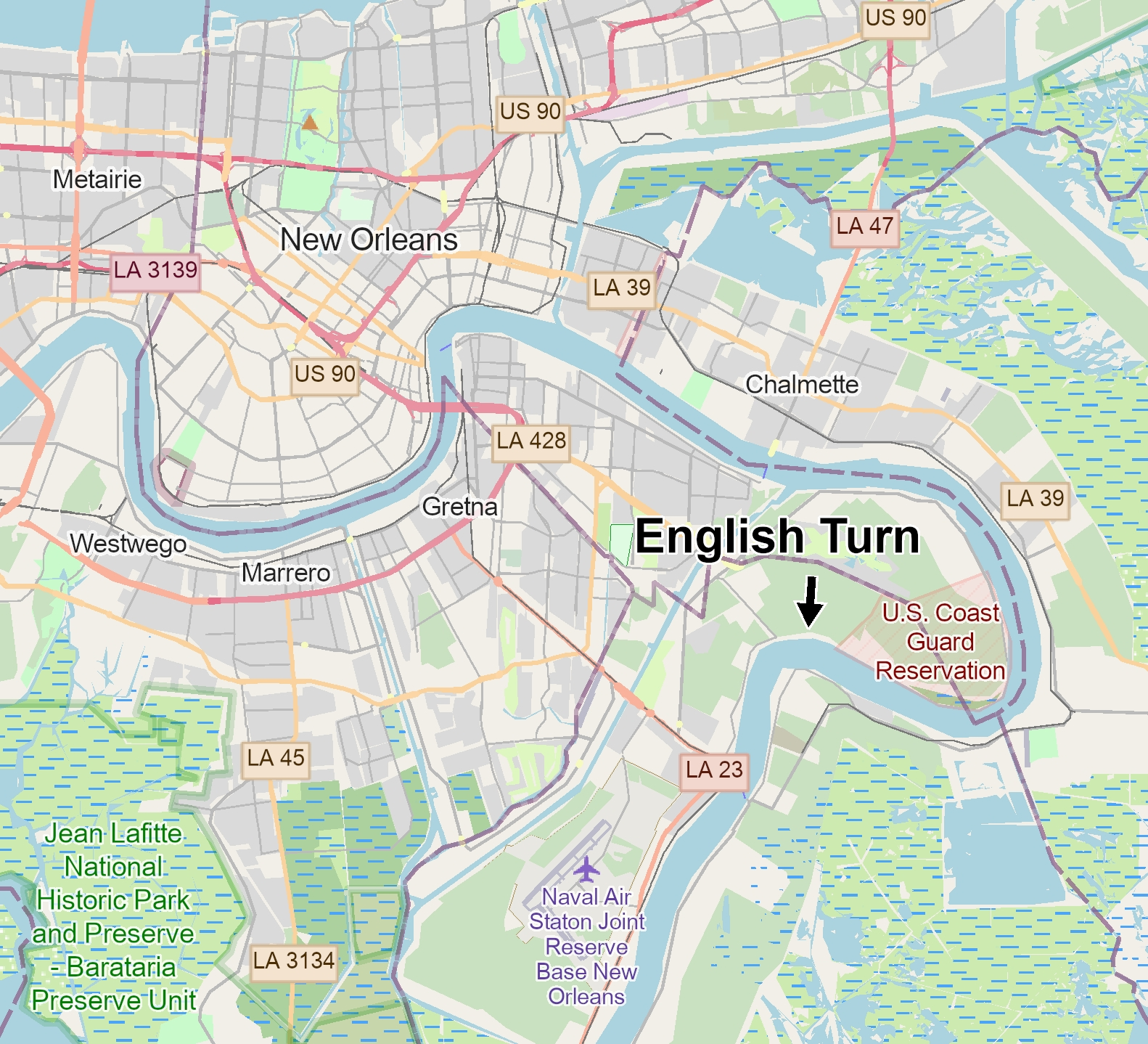
- Map of the English Turn in relation to New Orleans

- Location within Louisiana
- Coordinates: 29.88°N 89.96°W
- Location: Southeast of New Orleans
- Part of: Lower Mississippi River

English Turn is a bend in the Mississippi River in the metropolitan area of New Orleans, Louisiana.

== Etymology ==
In 1699, French explorers Sauvolle and Jean-Baptiste Le Moyne de Bienville were exploring the lower Mississippi and encountered English ships. Bienville was successful in ordering the English out of the river, and the event left the name, English Turn, on the bend.

== English Turn neighborhood ==
The English Turn neighborhood is a gated community that contains private property, a golf and country club, and swimming and tennis facilities.
