= Old Mobile Site =

Archaeological site in Alabama, US

- Old Mobile Site; Fort Louis De La Louisiane
- U.S. National Register of Historic Places
- Location within Alabama
- Location: Mobile County, Alabama
- Nearest city: Le Moyne, Alabama
- Coordinates: 30°58′07″N 87°59′38″W
- Area: 117 acres (47 ha)
- Built: 1702
- NRHP reference No.: 76000344
- Added to NRHP: May 6, 1976

The Old Mobile Site was the location of the French settlement La Mobile and the associated Fort Louis de La Louisiane, in the French colony of New France in North America, from 1702 until 1712. The site is located in Le Moyne, Alabama, on the Mobile River in the Mobile-Tensaw River Delta. The settlement served as the capital of French Louisiana from 1702 until 1711, when the capital was relocated to the site of present-day Mobile, Alabama. The settlement was founded and originally governed by Pierre Le Moyne d'Iberville. Upon the death of d'Iberville (or Iberville), the settlement was governed by his younger brother, Jean-Baptiste Le Moyne de Bienville. The site can be considered a French counterpart to the English colonial settlement at Jamestown in the Colony of Virginia. The settlement site and fort were listed on the National Register of Historic Places on May 6, 1976. The Old Mobile Site was determined eligible for designation as a National Historic Landmark on January 3, 2001.

== History ==
=== Factors leading to founding of Mobile ===
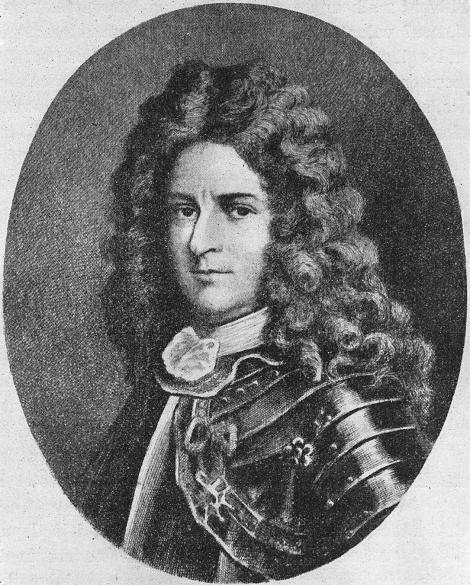
Le Moyne d'Iberville

Following the defeat of the Spanish Armada in 1588, Spain's power began to wane, allowing France to play an increasingly dominant role in Continental Europe while England became more active in the New World. Under Louis XIV and his ministers, France created an army which intimidated Continental Europe and a navy which was strong enough to support the exploration and settlement of Canada. In 1608, the French flag flew over Quebec.

Jesuit missionaries spread out to convert the Indians. Three such missionaries, Father Jacques Marquette, Father Joseph Limoges, and Louis Jolliet explored the Mississippi River. René Robert Cavelier, Sieur de La Salle floated down the river in 1682 and claimed the entire Mississippi basin for France in the name of Louis XIV. France soon realized that in order to counter English and Spanish influence in the region and to protect Louisiana and the Mississippi River they needed a fort on the Gulf of Mexico.

After the ascent of William and Mary to the throne of England in 1688, hostilities between England and France grew, increasing the urgency for a French settlement on the Gulf Coast. By controlling the Gulf Coast, the Alabama river valleys, the Mississippi River, the Ohio Valley, and Canada, France could surround the English and confine them to the Eastern Seaboard. The stakes, vast reaches of land and the lucrative Indian fur trade, were enormous.

=== The Le Moyne brothers: Iberville and Bienville ===
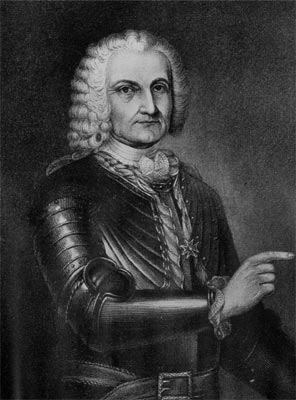
Le Moyne de Bienville

Pierre Le Moyne d'Iberville was born in Montreal to a French emigrant. During the first of the French and Indian Wars, King William's War, he attacked the English in North America with such ferocity and success that he became a hero in the French royal court. With his seamanship and leadership, he was a natural choice to lead the proposed French settlement.

The younger brother of Iberville was Jean-Baptiste Le Moyne de Bienville, an energetic man with a clear perception of his responsibilities. Consistent with the autocratic nature of the French government, Bienville ruled with authority when governor of Louisiana. Despite this style of governance, he inspired loyalty from his followers. He supported the Jesuits but was also willing to use them to his advantage. An understanding of Indian culture and Indian languages allowed him to establish friendships and alliances with Indian tribes. While normally kind and gentle, Bienville could also be cruel, causing men to both respect and fear him.

Two additional Le Moyne brothers, Joseph Le Moyne de Sérigny and Antoine Le Moyne de Châteaugué, contributed to Old Mobile by successfully repelling attacks by Indian tribes and English and Spanish forces.

=== Exploration and site selection ===
Shortly after King William's War had ended, Iberville sailed from Brest, France, with orders to establish a fort at the mouth of the Mississippi River. Accompanying Iberville on the voyage were Bienville, soldiers, and 200 colonists (including four women and children). The Le Moyne brothers arrived in Pensacola Bay on January 27, 1699, and were surprised to find that Spaniards from Vera Cruz had arrived three months earlier.

The French sailed on to Mobile Point (located at the western extreme of the peninsula that extends across much of Mobile Bay's mouth) and cast anchor on January 31 at the "mouth of La Mobilla". The group scouted a large island that, due to finding a group of 60 corpses on the island, Iberville named "Massacre Island" (later renamed "Dauphin Island"). From the top of an oak tree, Iberville could observe brackish water flowing from a river into the bay. He did not, however, detect the harbor on the northeast side of the island. After determining that the bay was too shallow, the party sailed onward.

The sailing party next visited the area of present-day Biloxi, Mississippi (or Old Biloxi). On March 2, 1699, Iberville discovered the mouth of the Mississippi and sailed up the river looking for a suitable landing site. Based on the low and marshy banks, it was concluded that no suitable location for a settlement was available in the area. After retracing his route to Biloxi, Iberville landed and constructed Fort Maurepas, a crude fort of squared logs. This fort would serve as Iberville's base for additional exploration of the coastal areas. After encounters with English ships on the Lower Mississippi, Iberville ordered Bienville to construct an additional fort. The French occupied Fort de la Boulaye in 1700. The accounts of André Pénicaut, a carpenter traveling with Iberville, reveal that "illnesses were becoming frequent" in the summer heat necessitating a move to higher ground.

Pénicaut was with a scouting party that discovered a "spot on high ground" near an Indian village approximately 20 miles (32 km) up the Mobile River. The location provided higher ground than Fort Maurepas and provided the additional benefit of allowing closer contact to the Indians and easier observation of the English colonists from Carolina. The French located the harbor on Massacre Island and named it Port Dauphin. They began moving the settlement from Fort Maurepas in 1702. Since shallow areas caused by silt from the rivers and a treacherous, shifting bar near Mobile Point made navigation by ocean-going vessels extremely dangerous, supplies were offloaded at Port Dauphin and then transported by smaller boats up the Mobile River.

Iberville's positive assessment of the selected location is apparent from the observations in his journals translated by Richebourg Gaillard McWilliams. Iberville first visited the bluff on March 3, 1702, approximately six weeks after construction of the new settlement had begun:

The settlement is on a ridge more than 20 feet above the water, wooded with mixed trees: white and red oak, laurel, sassafras, basswood, hickory, particularly a great many pines suitable for masts. This ridge and all the land about it are exceedingly good.

Writing about land north of the settlement, Iberville observed:

I have found the land good all along, the banks being flooded in some places. The greater part of the banks is covered with cypress trees, which are very fine, tall thick, straight. All the islands, too, are covered with cypresses, oaks, and other trees.

He also found the area to be well-suited to agricultural development:

Above the settlement, I have found almost everywhere, on both banks, abandoned Indian settlements, where one has only to settle farmers, who will have no more to do than cut canes or reeds or bramble before they sow.

=== Founding of Mobile and Fort Louis de la Louisiane ===
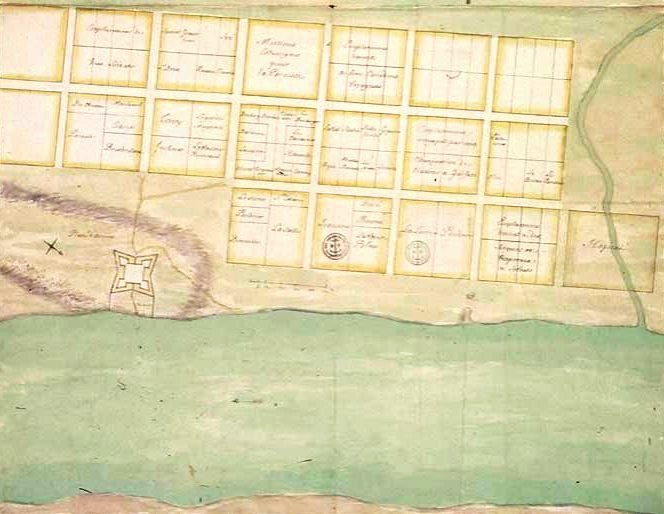
Proposed city plan drafted by Charles Levasseur in 1702

Charles Levasseur, a skilled draftsman with knowledge of the Mobile area, designed and built the new fort at Twenty-Seven Mile Bluff. The square fort, equipped with cannons on each corner, enclosed residential buildings for soldiers and officers, a house utilized as a chapel, and a warehouse. Behind Fort Louis de la Louisiana, a village (commonly called "La Mobile") was laid out in a grid pattern.

In 1704, Nicolas de la Salle conducted a census which revealed additional details regarding the settlement and its occupants. The structures identified in the census comprised a guardhouse, a forge, a gunsmith shop, a brick kiln, and eighty one-story wooden houses. The occupants included 180 men, 27 families with ten children, eleven Native American slave boys and girls, and numerous farm animals.

=== The struggle to survive and expand ===
Coureurs de bois from Canada avoided agricultural labor while the settlers were often unfamiliar with farming. In order to compensate for this lack of capabilities, slavery was utilized at La Mobile. Initially, native slaves were utilized for the clearing of land and tilling of fields. By 1710, the population of La Mobile included 90 Native American slaves and servants. Ultimately, the Native Americans proved physically and temperamentally unsuitable for the work resulting in the importation of African slaves.

Due to wars (particularly the War of the Spanish Succession) and English control of the seas, communications between Mobile and Paris were tenuous. For a 3-year period of time, Mobile received no supply ships from France. Although Mobile had experienced difficulties in establishing successful farming, local agriculture was necessary to sustain the colony. In order to prevent starvation, hunting and fishing were often necessary. Occasionally, the French resorted to purchasing food from the Spanish in Pensacola (to which they had loaned supplies) or in Havana.

Although the Mobilian Native Americans were friendly, other Native American tribes, such as the Alabama tribe, frequently attacked the fort as well as hunting or scouting parties. Primarily through the efforts of Henri de Tonti, the French became adept with Native American diplomacy. Bienville used entertainment and gifts to purchase Native American loyalty and to establish an alliance against the English. In 1700, the French signed an alliance with the Choctaw tribe. In 1702, the French were able to temporarily reconcile the Choctaws and Chickasaws just before the resumption of hostilities between the English and French. Additionally, the French interacted with the Apalachee, Tomeh, Chacato, Oumas, and Tawasa tribes. The interaction was detrimental to the regional Native American population which dropped from 5,000 in 1702 to 2,000 in 1711 due primarily to smallpox and other diseases introduced by the colonists.

Iberville left the region for the last time in June 1702. He subsequently recommended to the French government that one hundred "young and well-bred" women be sent to Mobile to marry the Canadians and increase the population by bearing children. In 1704, the women (selected from orphanages and convents) along with more soldiers and supplies departed La Rochelle aboard the Pélican. After a harrowing trip across the Atlantic Ocean, passengers were infected with yellow fever in Havana. As the feverish and sick began to die, the Pélican arrived at Massacre Island. The "twenty-three virtuous maidens", later to become known to history as "casquette girls", and their chaperones, "two grey nuns", finally arrived at Fort Louis. Their arrival was not "the glorious occasion that either the inhabitants of Mobile or the young women from Paris had envisioned". The young women were not prepared for the primitive wilderness. The hierarchy of French society remained present, as social prejudices in the settlement, and prevented development of the cooperative spirit necessary for success under the conditions of the colony. Missing the luxuries of France (such as French bread) and resenting the realities of the colony (such as cornbread), the women engaged in a "Petticoat Revolution" that "taxed Bienville's patience and ingenuity". However, the French government continued to send women to boost the population. The women were often referred to as "casquette girls" in reference to the small trunks called "cassettes" in French, in which some of the women brought their possessions.

The yellow fever epidemic claimed the lives of both Charles Levasseur and Henri de Tonti. The deaths represented a great loss to Bienville and the settlement. Upon the death of Iberville to yellow fever in Havana in July 1706, Bienville became governor of Louisiana at the age of 27. Although he had only spent a total of 25 days in the settlement, the death of Iberville was a blow to the colony since he had represented the concerns of Louisiana in Europe and was able to win concessions for the struggling town from the French court.

After Iberville's death, Jérôme Phélypeaux de Maurepas de Pontchartrain, minister for North American colonial affairs under King Louis XIV, received complaints from Henri Roulleaux de La Vente, curé of Old Mobile, and Nicolas de La Salle, keeper of the royal warehouse, regarding questionable trading practices of the Le Moyne brothers to the detriment of the colony. Based on the accusations, Pontchartrain appointed Nicolas Daneau, sieur de Muy as the new governor of Louisiana and Jean-Baptiste-Martin D'artaguiette d'Iron as a special commissioner to investigate the charges. The new governor died at sea before reaching Mobile. Although Dartaguiette d'Iron did reach Mobile, he was unable to substantiate the charges against the Le Moyne brothers and Bienville remained in charge of Louisiana.

By 1708, Bienville realized the growing English threat to the fledgling colony at Mobile, having received news of raids by English colonists against Spanish missions in Florida which had reduced Spain's Floridian presence to the colonial settlement of St. Augustine. Suspecting that the English would soon launch an expedition against Mobile, Bienville undertook steps to strengthen the settlement's defences. In the first week of May 1709, the Alabama tribe, who were allied with the English, attacked a village of the Mobilian tribe thirteen miles (21 km) north of Old Mobile. The Mobilians were able to drive the attacking Alabama tribesmen away, however.

The occupants of the settlement began to complain about its location. Particularly, they felt that the settlement was too far from the bay and that the land was too poorly drained, requiring several weeks after each rain for the standing water to drain.

=== Abandonment of Old Mobile site ===
In 1710, an English privateer from Jamaica captured Port Dauphin, confiscated the supplies, food, and deer skins, looted the citizens, burned the houses and sailed away. Fort Louis received the news by canoe several days later. The possibility of moving the fort closer to the bay and abandoning the vulnerable Port Dauphin were discussed.

In the spring of 1711, a flood rushed into Fort Louis forcing soldiers and citizens to seek safety in the trees. The houses of the settlement were submerged to the top of their roofs for nearly a month. The flood was the ultimate factor in the decision to relocate the settlement. When the French abandoned Twenty-Seven Mile Bluff, the fort and houses were burned. It is likely that the structures were destroyed to prevent enemies from easily establishing a fortification at the site.

Bienville selected the location where the river meets the bay and surveyed a town. It was once theorized that soldiers and colonists dismantled houses and the fort and moved the timber and supplies down the river. However, archaeological evidence now indicates that all excavated structures were burned in place. By the middle of 1712, the relocation was complete. Gradually, La Mobile reverted to wilderness.

== La Mobile ==
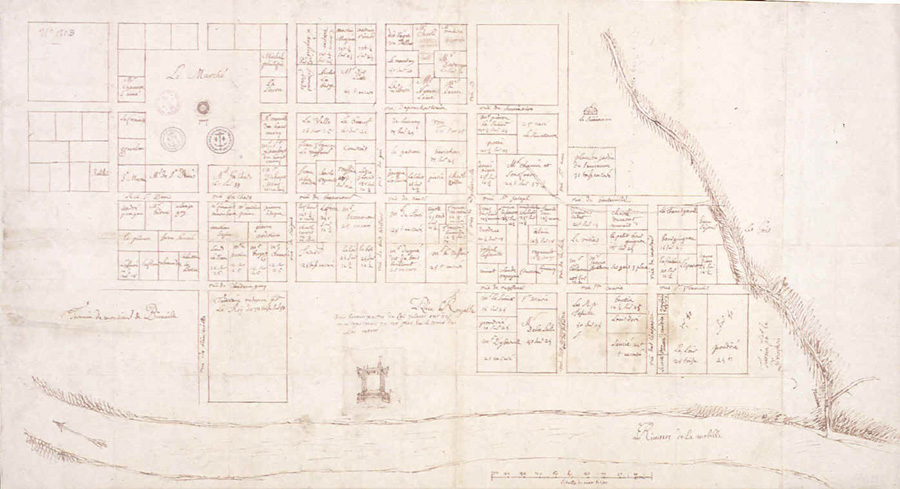
Map of Old Mobile Site and Fort Louis drawn in 1704-1705 (right side of map represents north)

At its peak the town of Old Mobile (La Mobile) had a population of approximately 350 inhabitants occupying between 80 and 100 structures. City plans from 1702 and 1704-1705 reveal widely dispersed houses set on large lots arranged in a grid pattern. Iberville and Levasseur divided the land into large square blocks approximately 320 by 320 feet (98 by 98 metres). These blocks were further subdivided into lots of various sizes and shapes. The plots were generally assigned to the inhabitants based on their occupation or role in the colonial town. For example, carpenters occupied a district on the northwest side, Canadians and voyageurs lived toward the western outskirts, and administrative personnel and officers were grouped in close proximity to the fort or within the fort. A large market square with a well was located at the southwest corner of the site.

== Fort Louis de la Louisiane ==
Drawing of Fort Louis de la Louisiane from map of 1704-1705

Fort Louis de la Louisiane served as the political, military, and religious center of the settlement. The fort housed the residences of Bienville and his officers and soldiers as well as a chapel and several other structures.

A detailed description of Fort Louis can be found in the narrative of André Pénicaut:

This fort was sixty toises [117-m or 384-ft] square. At each of the four corners there was a battery of six pieces of cannon which, protruding outside in a half circle, covered the sector in front and to right and left. Inside, within the curtains, were four fronts of buildings fifteen feet back from the curtains behind them. These buildings were to be used as chapel, as quarters for the commandant and the officers, as warehouses, as guardhouse. So, in the midst of these buildings there was a place d'armes forty-five toises [88-m or 288-ft] square.

The fort bastions were constructed using pièce-sur-pièce techniques. In pièce-sur-pièce construction, timbers with tenons (projections) cut on each end are laid atop one another horizontally. The tenons are inserted into vertical grooves in periodically spaced vertical posts (coulisse). The fort was surrounded by a palisade fence. Due to the damp conditions of the site, wooden structures rotted quickly necessitating replacement of the bastion timbers and palisade posts at approximately five-year intervals. By 1705, Bienville noted that the rotting wood of the fort made firing of the cannons unsafe. To prepare for the coming conflict with the English, the fort was repaired in 1707. Within a year, however, the bastions of the fort were severely rotted and could barely support the weight of the cannons. As the English threat intensified, the size of the fort was increased by a third so that it could accommodate all of the residents of Old Mobile and the surrounding allied Indian tribes.

== Archaeology of the Old Mobile Site ==
=== Location of the Old Mobile Site ===
Until the later part of the 20th century, the precise location of the Old Mobile Site was not known. Maps and plans from the Bibliothèque nationale and the Archives nationales in France provided strong evidence that the site was located at Twenty-Seven Mile Bluff. However, local parties argued that the location was near the mouth of Dog River.

Based on maps from the Archives nationales and local probate records, Peter Hamilton, author of Colonial Mobile (1910), concluded correctly that the site was located at Twenty-Seven Mile Bluff. He claimed locating the well and finding bullets, crockery, large-headed spikes, and a brass ornament at the site. During a visit to the site in 1902, Carey Butt, a colleague of Peter Hamilton, suspected he had located the powder magazine of Fort Louis. Based on the maps and the claims of Butt, the Iberville Historical Society erected a monument at the site in 1902 during the celebration of the 200th anniversary of the founding of Mobile.

=== Archaeological projects and surveys ===
In 1970, the University of Alabama under the direction of Donald Harris conducted the first archaeological survey of the site. The survey lasted for a two-week period in a location immediately north from the monument. Harris unearthed a foundation which he incorrectly attributed to Fort Louis. In addition, Harris located Indian pottery and small iron cannonballs.

In the middle of the 1970s, the Old Mobile Research Team was founded. James C. "Buddy" Parnell formed the group with friends and fellow employees of Courtaulds Fibers, a company which owned a portion of the suspected Old Mobile site. Members of the team determined that Donald Harris had been exploring the incorrect location. Based on clues from aerial photographs and French maps, the team located a house of the former settlement in February 1989. Other artifacts including fragments of dinnerware, clay pipe stems, and bricks were discovered during this effort.

In May 1989, the Old Mobile Project was formed as a community effort involving Mobile County, the city of Mobile, and the University of South Alabama. Funding for the project came from the private sector, university startup funds, the Alabama Historical Commission, the Bedsole Foundation, the Mitchell Foundation, the Alabama Legislature, the National Endowment for the Humanities, and the National Science Foundation. The landowners of the Old Mobile Site (Courtaulds Fibers, DuPont, Alabama Power Company) permitted excavation on the site. In June 1989, excavation of the site began under the direction of Gregory A. Waselkov. Although previous efforts had helped to establish the precise location of the site, the surveys related to the Old Mobile Project yielded the most archaeological records of the Old Mobile site.

=== Archaeological record of Old Mobile Site ===
Extensive shovel testing was utilized to determine the extent of the site and to locate structures of the settlement. From 1989 to 1993, approximately 20,000 shovel tests were performed at intervals of thirteen feet (4.0 m). Since extensive excavation began in 1989, the locations of more than 50 buildings and the approximate boundaries of Old Mobile have been identified. Eight of these sites have been partially or completing excavated. The sites of Fort Louis or the settlement's cemetery have not been identified. Archaeological surveys have shown that an eastern portion of Old Mobile, possibly including portions of Fort Louis, was lost to river erosion.

Buildings were constructed using both poteaux-en-terre and poteaux-sur-sole techniques. In poteaux-en-terre construction, wooden posts are placed vertically into the ground. The gaps remaining between the posts were filled with a mixture of mud or clay and Spanish moss or hay. The mixture can be supplemented with small rocks. The walls are bound by a top plate and protected with plaster or siding. In poteaux-sur-sole construction, the floor of the building is elevated through the use of a bottom sill. The sill was formed by laying the wooden members directly on the ground. The elevation of the floor provided an airspace that minimized damage from moisture and insects. Since the conditions of the site were damaging against wooden structures, the poteaux-sur-sole structures would have been advantageous since their sill members could be more easily replaced than the wooden posts of a poteaux-en-terre structure. Exterior trenches suggest that palisade fences were used around some of the buildings.

During the summer of 1989, the archaeologists of the Old Mobile Project excavated a house site located near the western edge of the site. The house, believed to have been occupied by French Canadians, was a long narrow building consisting of a parlor flanked by two bedrooms with a fenced garden or animal pen at one end. The only remaining features of the house were the footing trenches used for wall sills, clay floors, and brick rubble remaining from a fireplace. During the 1990 field survey, the location of a blacksmith shop was identified by the discovery of large quantities of iron scrap, slag, coal, and charcoal.

These excavations have also recovered thousands of artifacts. Originally utilized as a "property identifier", a lead seal dated 1701 with the name of the "Company of Indies of France" and a fleur-de-lis provided evidence that the location of the settlement had been properly identified. Among other items discovered at the site included construction materials (fired wall clay known as bousillage, roof tiles), dishware (French faience, Mexican majolica, Chinese porcelain, kettle fragments, wine glasses), weaponry (French gun flints, lead shot, gun and sword parts), clothing remnants (brass and silver buttons, shoe and clothing buckles), currency (French and Spanish coins, glass trade beads), and ceremonial items (catlinite fragments from the bowl of a ceremonial pipe.).

=== Structural evidence ===
The town was constructed on a grid pattern, with each block representing anywhere from 2 to 10 individual lots, separated by dirt streets approximately 12 m (40 ft) wide. Nine structures have been fully excavated at this site, with many others partially excavated as well. Old Mobile contained over 100 separate buildings during its peak occupancy, each with different occupations and families living within them. Structures 1, 3, and 5 on the western side of the town were domestic dwellings, for example. Structure 2 was a blacksmith shop, as evidenced by a forge. Structures 4 and 14 were likely taverns. Structures 30-32 were likely military barracks. These structures were erected using the 3-wall construction method, and showed variability between poteux-en-terre, poteux-sur-sole, and piéce-sur-piéce, depending on who was building them and who living within. Roofs were often made of river cane or wooden shingles and thatched with palmetto (some structures contained terracotta tiled roofs but not enough to indicate this being a common practice). Given that spaces between timbers during construction were patched with a mix of clay and Spanish moss, there is evidence of large pits near many structures where the clay was harvested. Nearly every structure has some evidence of these pits, which would later become middens for whoever lived within the structure. Accidental fires and natural disasters often led to widespread and common destruction of houses; these would be either abandoned or repaired depending on the degree of damage.

Soldiers played an important role in the construction of Old Mobile. Often as young as 13 or 14, young untrained soldiers would either join the military out of necessity, or be taken in from prisons (though these were normally adults). These troupes de la marine were forced to go overseas to colonies such as Old Mobile, many of them presiding near Fort Louis. While, as soldiers, they were tasked with protecting the colony, many were untrained and underpaid, being on a similar level to indentured servants. It was, thus, their duty to construct, repair, and maintain several parts of the town, including having to construct their own garrisons.

Structures 30-32 were among the structures likely to have been built by soldiers for their own occupation, as evidence by their proximity to Fort Louis. The poteux-en-terre construction of them points to their impermanence and ease of construction, especially at the hands of untrained soldiers. These were fenced-in constructions, with Structure 30 in particular containing several small sections within which are too small to have been rooms. Due to the nature of its construction and the great number of artifacts found inside, points to this being a storage structure.

=== Floral/Faunal remains ===
A vast number of floral and faunal remains have been found at the site, adding to information regarding subsistence strategies of the colonists. Historical evidence points to colonists making poor attempts at self-sufficiency. A census taken in 1704 mentions: 9 oxen, 4 bulls, 14 cows, 5 calves, 3 kids, ~100 pigs, and ~400 chickens. Similarly, a 1708 census mentions: 8 oxen, 4 bulls, 50 cows, 40 calves, ~1400 pigs, and ~2000 chickens. Historical records show that most of these animals were shipped to the colony rather than being bred at the site itself. A sample of faunal remains from Structures 1-5 revealed 47,348 individual specimens weighing 3 kg in total. However, due to the structures likely being burned down when the site was abandoned in 1711, climatic conditions, and the high acidity of the soil (avg 5.5), bone preservation is poor. The majority of these bones were heavily fragmented and calcined, meaning only 0.5% could be confidently identified.

Of the bones which could be identified to a specific taxon, the biomass indicates that 93% belonged to the following mammals: white-tailed deer, pig, black bear, opossum, muskrat, beaver, squirrel, and dog (not as a food). 5.1% of the biomass came from birds, while turtles and fish each represented less than 1% of the assemblage. While the largest assemblages contained mainly domesticated animals (pig and chicken), wild game, waterfowl, and shellfish were significantly more common overall. This would suggest that, due to the unreliability of French shipments, colonists relied heavily on wild game which they either hunted themselves, or was provided by the local Native American tribes.

Botanical remains, found mainly in pits, middens, and trenches, were uncovered and studied via a series of flotation samples. As with most archaeobotanical evidence, certain items may be underrepresented or overrepresented depending on their ability for preservation. Flour, for example, does not preserve well, maize preserves far better than beans, and fruits do not preserve well at all, etc. For this site in particular, most of the plant remains are heavily carbonized, implying they were either cooked and deposited in middens, or cooked when the site was burned down.

Domestic plants dominated the diet of colonists at Old Mobile. Maize, the primary food staple of the colony, was the most commonly found plant. Analysis of the kernel size and rows-per-cobb align with information on local and foreign maize species, and implies that the maize at Old Mobile was produced locally, either by colonists or Native bands. Other local foodstuffs included several fleshy fruits (sumac, plum, persimmon, black gum, grape) and several nuts. These would have likely been either traded to the colonists by Natives, or gathered by colonists themselves. European plant remains are also found, most notably the fava bean, a key part of Mediterranean, Middle Eastern, and southern European cuisine. While not native to the Americas, these would have likely been imported on shipments and grown in the moisture-rich soils of Old Mobile. Peaches were also imported to the colony, though evidence suggests that these were used as trade goods more often than not.

There were not great differences in floral assemblages between different structures on the site. Most represented a syncretic subsistence system, using local maize and imported beans as dietary staples, which were then further supplemented with local fruits and nuts. Historical evidence (largely in the form of journals and trade logs) indicate that colonists much preferred trading for goods over growing them themselves, due to the unreliability of foreign aid. Given that local Native bands and European colonists both relied on women to prepare meals, it is likely that Native women taught colonial women how to find and prepare these indigenous plant species.

=== Diagnostic European artifacts ===
Excavations of Structure 30 in particular yielded a large diversity in not only Native American artifacts, but diagnostic European artifacts as well. While Native American ceramics were preferred (making up roughly 64% of the ceramics found at the site), several other types of European artifacts were found, many of which were used for trade with local bands. They are as follows, separated by type of artifact and listed with descriptions:

==== Tin-glazed Vessels ====
- Normandy Plain
- St. Cloud Polychrome
- Nevers Polychrome

==== Plateware ====
- Abó Polychrome
- San Luis Polychrome
- Puebla Polychrome
  - note: most plateware found at the site is stylistically indicative of Spanish designs

==== Lead-Glazed Course Earthenware ====
- Green-glazed (Southwestern France)
- Other types of glaze indicative of French manufacture
- Few Spanish and English styles

==== Pipes (very common, often made with red pipestone) ====
- European white-clay designed (occasionally inscribed with initials of craftsman)
- Native American designed (often inscribed with some artistic design, or name of craftsman)

==== Metal ====
- Copper and brass decorative pieces
- Swords (brass)
- Lead Rupert Shot (likely manufactured on-site)

==== Glass ====
- Mostly olive-green (French-made)
- Beads (see below)

==== Chinese Porcelain ====
- Rare but present

In addition to all of these artifacts, roughly 2,500 glass beads were unearthed from six different structures on the sites, with most coming from colonial contexts. These beads would have been worn by colonists and Natives alike, and became both a significant trade good, and a useful tool for archaeologists attempting to establish a chronological baseline for glass bead dating in relation to French colonial sites in the Americas. Several beads found mirror beads found at Spanish mission sites to the south (Seven Oaks Gilded, San Luis and Teardrop Pendants, Two-Faceted Crystal Beads, and Carnelian Beads), and align with a migration of Apalachee Native Americans fleeing Spanish persecution, taking their beads with them. Worn in several different ways, European glass beads appear in archaeological assemblages at this site, at nearby Native American sites, and all across the United States. As Old Mobile was one of the first true French colonies in the US, bead production and transport can be traced back to Old Mobile, allowing the beads found here to act as a terminus post quem for other bead studies in nearby French colonial sites.

=== Interactions with Native tribes ===
The relationship between the French colonists and nearby Native American bands was one of mutual benefit for the two groups. Without aid from these bands, historians have argued that the colony would likely have failed. While Indian slaves did exist in the colony, their number gradually diminished as more casket girls came to the settlement from France to increase the female population. French colonists were also careful not to enslave Indians from tribes who were allied to them, which at times included (among others) the Chacato and Apalachee. For some Chacato and Apalachee, the colony as a refuge from slave raids and a place "where some of their material and spiritual wants and needs could be satisfied". While most of the artifact evidence points to a great relationship to the Apalachees (evidenced in Lamar Complicated Stamped and Marsh Island Incised pottery styles as well as Spanish Glass Beads), historical evidence points to a greater relationship with the local Mobilian peoples (evidenced by trade reports, the trade language, the site name, and Port Dauphin Incised pottery). In fact, 64% of pottery on the site came from Native craftsmen and historical documents mention frequent and mutually beneficial trade deals struck with the nearby tribes. Unfortunately, the pottery economy is not well represented in trade records, pointing to a possibility that these were low-cost transactions, and that the colonists did not place a high monetary value on Native pottery. The French settlers largely relied on the Natives for wild game when their food supplies were running low. Native groups provided maize, venison, furs, deerskins, and pottery. While French colonists provided beads, catlinite pipes, guns, knives, and nails.

In some cases, Native Americans would live in European structures, sometimes as slaves but also as teachers, wives, or extensions of their family. Colonists did not know everything about the land; thus, they were likely taught by Native groups how to cultivate and prepare certain types of local resources. Some French soldiers asked their commanders if they could live with the Native bands, as housing for soldiers around Fort Louis was difficult to manage. Soldiers frequently relied on Native Americans during winter months, as they could often not afford to have their tattered and ripped uniforms replaced, and thus wore deerskin and fur manufactured by Natives.

Natives were not expressly forced to assimilate to French colonial culture. While some did conform to European standards of craftmaking or hunting, most maintained their cultural traditions. Even the language spoken by the two groups to communicate with one another (known as Pidgin) was mainly Mobilian, with a few French and Spanish words having been incorporated. The two cultures built off of one other, with Native groups becoming increasingly colonial in their appearance, and French colonists changing their culinary habits to become more in line with Native foodways.

The interactions between Native bands and French colonists at this site would set a precedent for interactions between French colonists and Native bands in future settlements. While some tribes were not as friendly as others, the Old Mobile site (and the associated Structure 1MB147) is good evidence of positive relations and a type of cultural syncretism within early French colonial societies in North America.

==== Structure 1MB147 ====
One structure in particular, 1MB147, which lies in the Northwest Corner of the town, acted as one of the few structures known to have housed a Native American family. This structure is unique, as it contains little evidence of European influence. It is built in a different way than the other houses in the town, it is oriented to the cardinal directions as opposed to the town's grid system and has foundations which are much shallower and simpler than the colonial designs. Faunal remains from the site indicate that whoever lived there did not partake in the consumption of any domesticated animals. There are actually less Native artifacts found at this site, and more European artifacts, indicated that whoever lived here participated in a significant amount of trade with their colonial neighbors. This structure also is indicative of what historical records say – that Native individuals lived just outside of the town's periphery, so as to engage in economic transactions more easily. Natives living in structures such as this were not forced to do so, and the differences of the construction of this building is good evidence that Natives maintained many of their original lifeways, not succumbing to forms of forced assimilation.

=== Using Old Mobile for defining French colonialism in the American South ===
Old Mobile, as a site, lays the groundwork for how to interpret French colonialism in the American South. Unlike certain other imperialist countries, French culture did not completely consume Native culture in places where extended periods of interaction occurred. Rather, a form of syncretism developed, changing both cultures and creating something completely new. Using this site as a baseline, dates can be examined from floral and faunal evidence, as well as from glass beads and other European artifacts. Native American artifacts found at the site can be used to trace France's sphere of influence throughout America.

It is unrealistic to discuss French colonialism without taking an intersectional approach, as French colonial culture was inseparable from Native support, which must also take into account the experience of women. Floral and faunal evidence suggests that Natives were ready and willing to aid in the colonist's survival, and artifact evidence indicates a massive economic interest between the two groups. Further analysis of subsistence lends credence to the influence of women in the colonial narrative, especially Native women, without whom colonists would not have had knowledge of how to cook and prepare local ingredients. While shipments from France and its colonies, as well as trade shipments from Spanish colonies did add to the diversity of assemblages, it also acted as a method of artifact diffusion throughout the American South.

Old Mobile was a bastion of French culture and trade during the earliest period of occupation of the Gulf Coast. Survival techniques, and changes in language and lifeways would continue throughout subsequent sites of occupation: present-day Mobile, Port Dauphin, or sites throughout the St. Lawrence river valley.

== See also ==
- Fort Charlotte, Mobile
- History of Mobile, Alabama
- Dauphin Island
- List of French forts in North America
- Louisiana (New France)
