= Le Moyne, Alabama =

Unincorporated community in Alabama, United States

- Unincorporated community
- Location within Alabama Location within the United States
- Coordinates: 30°57′29″N 88°1′40″W
- Country: United States
- State: Alabama
- County: Mobile
- Elevation: 39 ft (12 m)
- Time zone: UTC-6 (Central (CST))
  - Summer (DST): UTC-5 (CDT)
- Area code: 251

Le Moyne is an unincorporated community in Mobile County, Alabama, United States. It was named in honor of the Le Moyne brothers, Pierre Le Moyne d'Iberville and Jean-Baptiste Le Moyne, Sieur de Bienville, founders of colonial Mobile. Twenty-Seven Mile Bluff, on the Mobile River, is located in Le Moyne. The bluff is the site of the former Fort Louis de La Louisiane, capital of French Louisiana from 1702 until 1711.

== Geography ==
Le Moyne is located at 30.95823°N 88.027776°W and has an elevation of 39 feet (12 m).
