= Adrien de Pauger =

French engineer and cartographer

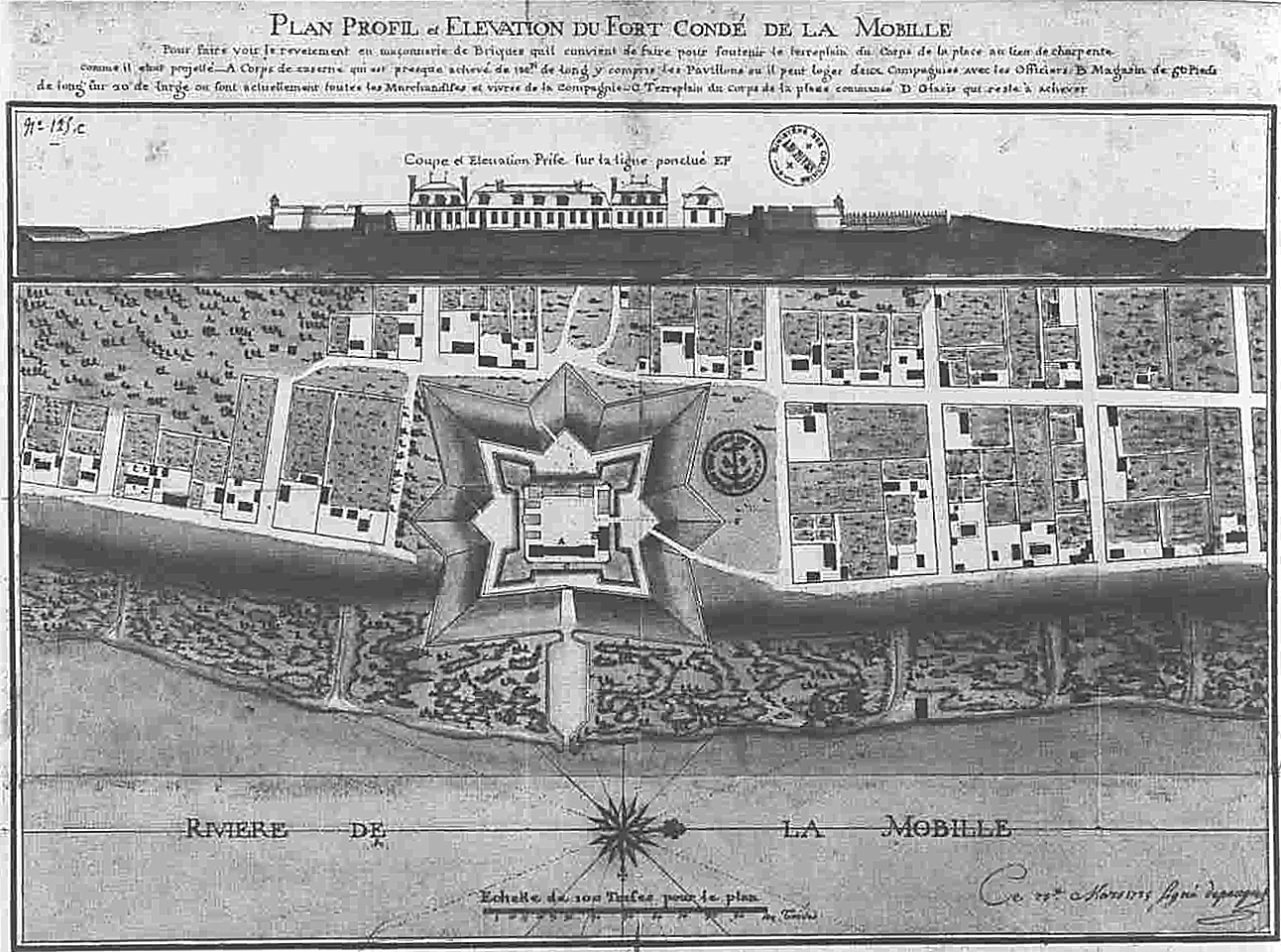
de Pauger's 1725 Plan of Mobile, Alabama

Adrien de Pauger (ca. 1685 or 1682 – 9 June 1726) was the French engineer and cartographer who designed the streets of the Vieux Carre, today known as the "French Quarter", and drew the original map of the city that became New Orleans, Louisiana. De Pauger was appointed in 1720 by Jean-Baptiste Le Moyne de Bienville to draw up the plans for the new city. De Pauger arrived in the settlement on March 29, 1721. The plan was completed later in 1721, which was a significant step to establishing permanence in the French settlement. De Pauger also selected many of the street names such as Bourbon Street and Royal Street as well as others. This street plan is still in place today. Working with Bienville's chief engineer Pierre Le Blond de La Tour, they impressed slave labor to construct the settlement making use of water-resistant cypress wood for raised cottage construction. Slaves under de Pauger labored under the rules of Code Noir, which defined the conditions of slaves in the French Colonial Empire.

Biloxi, Mississippi, was the original seaport near the mouth of the Mississippi River for the French colonies. De Pauger successfully lobbied Bienville to have the seat of government of these colonies moved from Biloxi to New Orleans. As a member of the "superior council" overseeing the Louisiana colonies at the time, De Pauger also pressed for establishing a deep water port at New Orleans, in addition to the one already in existence at Biloxi. De Pauger's belief was based on his survey of the mouth of the Mississippi River which showed that the mouth had regions sufficiently deep to allow passage of ships drawing fifteen feet of water. Only later would this deep water port at New Orleans be established, opening a major seaway for exports of the agricultural output from the middle of the Mississippi River Valley.

Following the example of his project in New Orleans, de Pauger designed in 1725 the early settlement that became the city of Mobile, Alabama, including Fort Condé, the fort built to defend the new settlement.

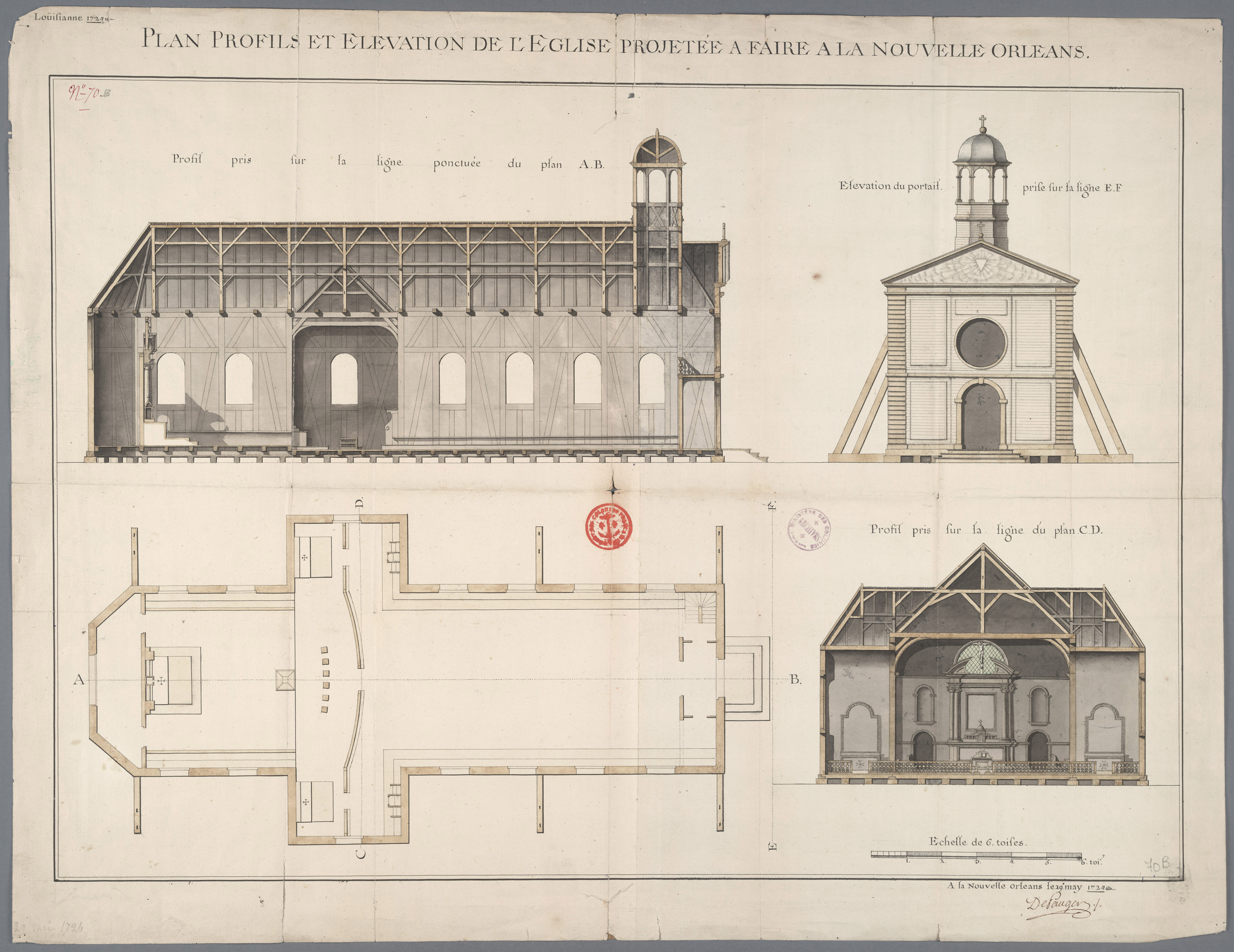
Saint Louis Parish Church New Orleans plans 1724

The 1724 plan for Saint Louis Parish Church, New Orleans, Louisiana, by Adrien de Pauger is shown at right. The church was built following his design and was dedicated on Christmas Eve in 1727. The Roman Catholic Church established a parish around the church that de Pauger designed, the parish beginning in 1720. The original church was subsequently destroyed by fire on 21 March 1788, part of the Great New Orleans Fire of 1788. Its replacement became the St. Louis Cathedral.

De Pauger died on June 9, 1726. It is believed that he was buried in the not-yet-completed Saint Louis Parish Church by his request. Pauger Street in New Orleans is named in de Pauger's honor. This street, a continuation of Bourbon Street, originates in the old time suburb that is today known as Faubourg Marigny, with the street extending through the Faubourg Treme area before merging with Cameron Boulevard at Filmore Avenue in the Gentilly section of New Orleans. These neighborhoods are all near the original French Quarter.
