= Conde–Charlotte House =

Historic house in Alabama, United States

- Kirkbride House
- U.S. National Register of Historic Places
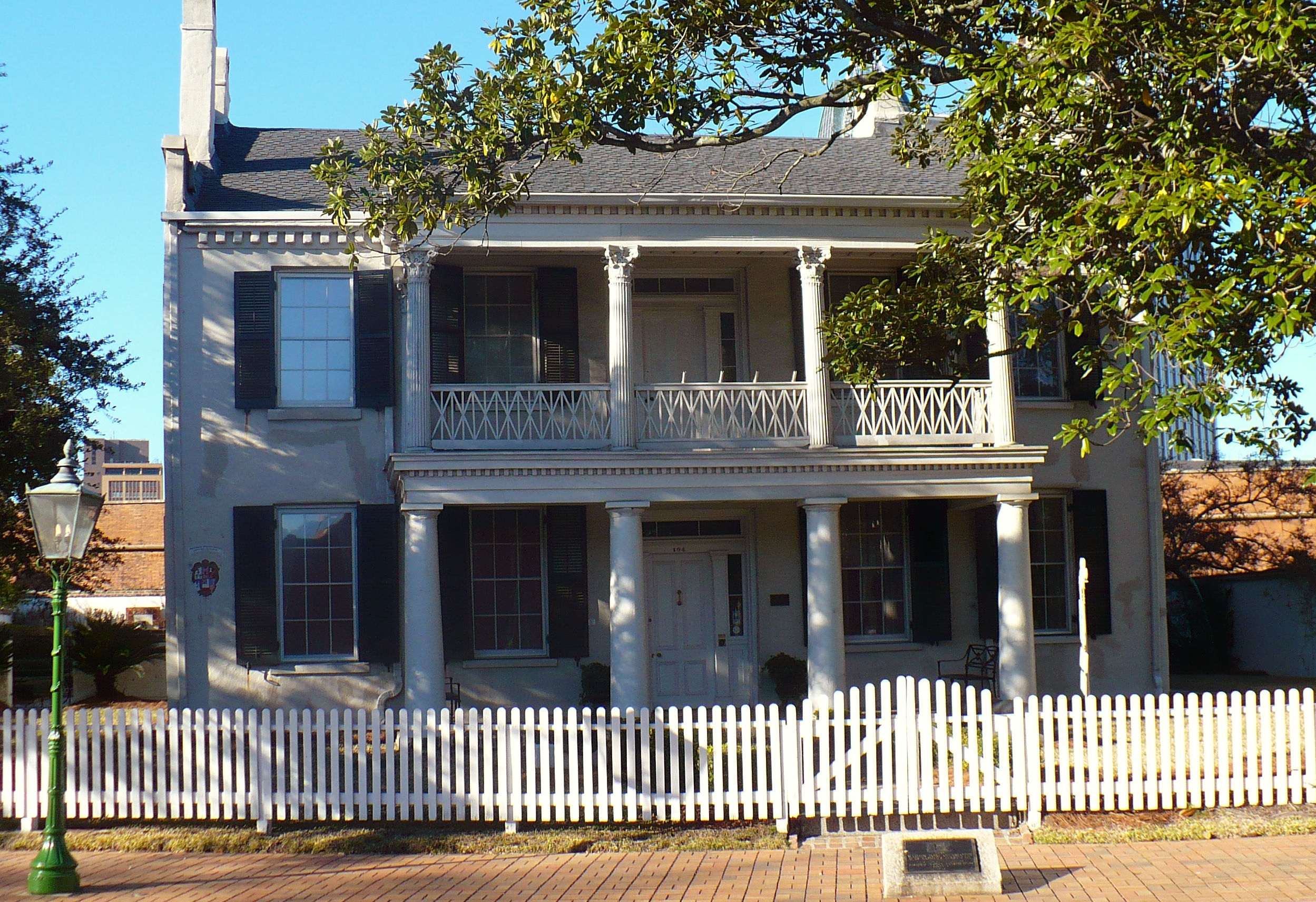

- Location within Mobile, Alabama Location within Alabama Location within the United States
- Location: 104 Theater Street; Mobile, Alabama
- Coordinates: 30°41′18″N 88°2′24″W
- Area: less than one acre
- Built: 1822-1849
- Architect: Peter Hobart
- Architectural style: Federal, Greek Revival
- NRHP reference No.: 73000363
- Added to NRHP: December 12, 1973

The Conde–Charlotte House, also known as the Kirkbride House, is a historic house museum in Mobile, Alabama. The earliest section of the building, the rear kitchen wing, was built in 1822. The main section of the house was added a few decades later and is two and a half floors. The entire structure is constructed of handmade brick with a smooth stucco plaster over the exterior.

== History ==
The house had its beginnings in 1822 as Mobile's first courthouse and city jail, and was built between the southern bastions of Fort Condé. The fort itself was in the process of being demolished at the time. In 1849 the site was purchased by Jonathan Kirkbride from Mount Holly in New Jersey and the old courthouse and jail were converted into a kitchen wing, attached to the newly built main house. The residence would remain in the Kirkbride family until 1905, when it was purchased by B. J. Bishop. The site was purchased by the Historic Mobile Preservation Society in 1940 and a partial restoration was undertaken. It was during this time that the outlines of four of the old jail cells were discovered in the kitchen wing. The restoration would later be completed by The National Society of the Colonial Dames of America.

== Description ==
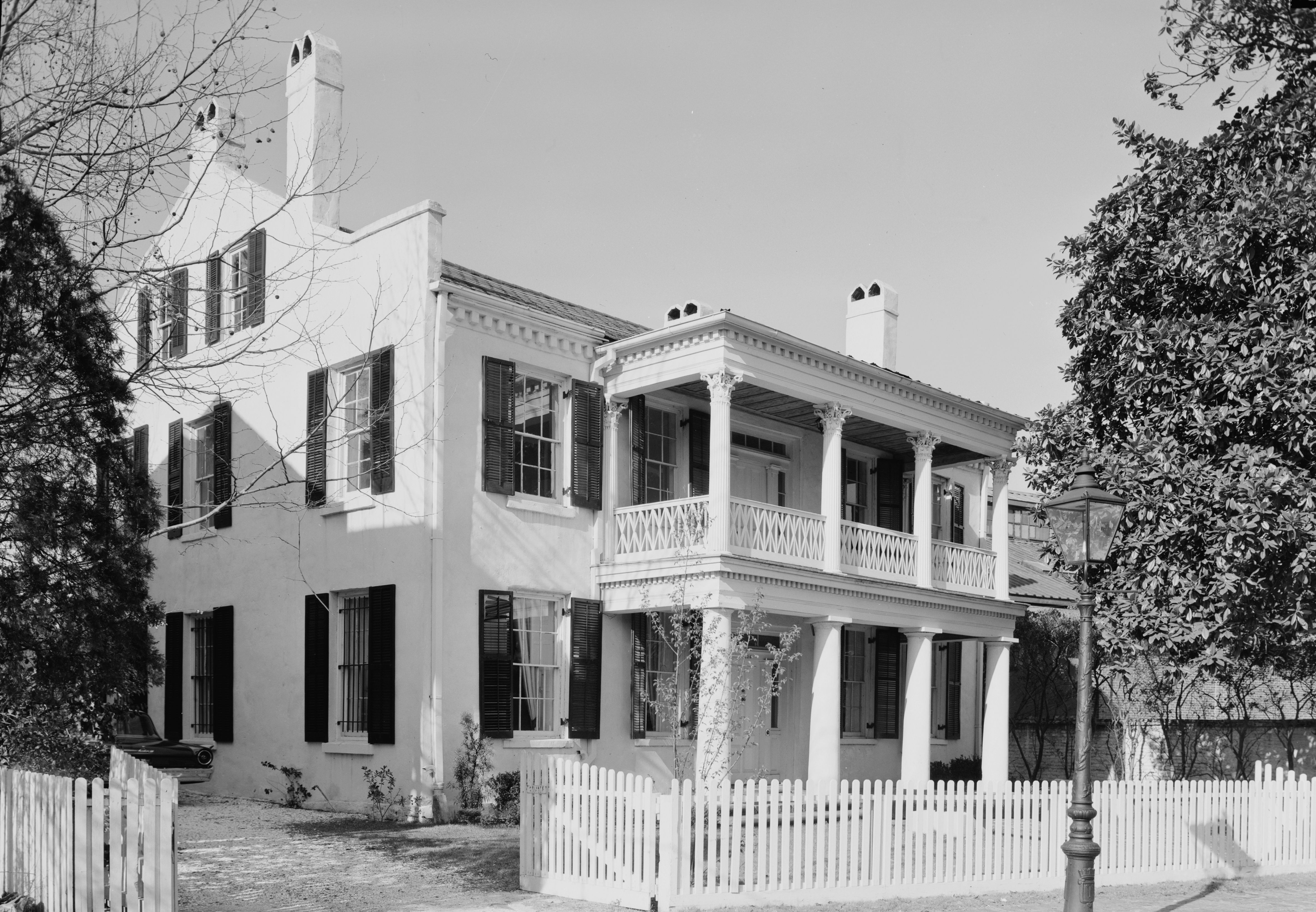
Conde–Charlotte House in 1936

The house was originally built in the Federal style and was later altered to reflect the Greek Revival style. It has a two-story portico on the front elevation featuring brick Doric columns on the lower level and wooden Corinthian columns on the upper level.

The house is 45 feet (13.7 m) wide at the front southern elevation, 72 feet (21.9 m) long at the eastern elevation, and 90 feet (27.4 m) long at the western elevation, including the carriage house. The ground floor is 10 feet (3.0 m) high from floor to ceiling and the upper story is 9 feet (2.7 m) high. The overall structure is brick with stucco, with the front upper portico, rear galleries, and trim in wood.

== Historical neighborhood restoration ==
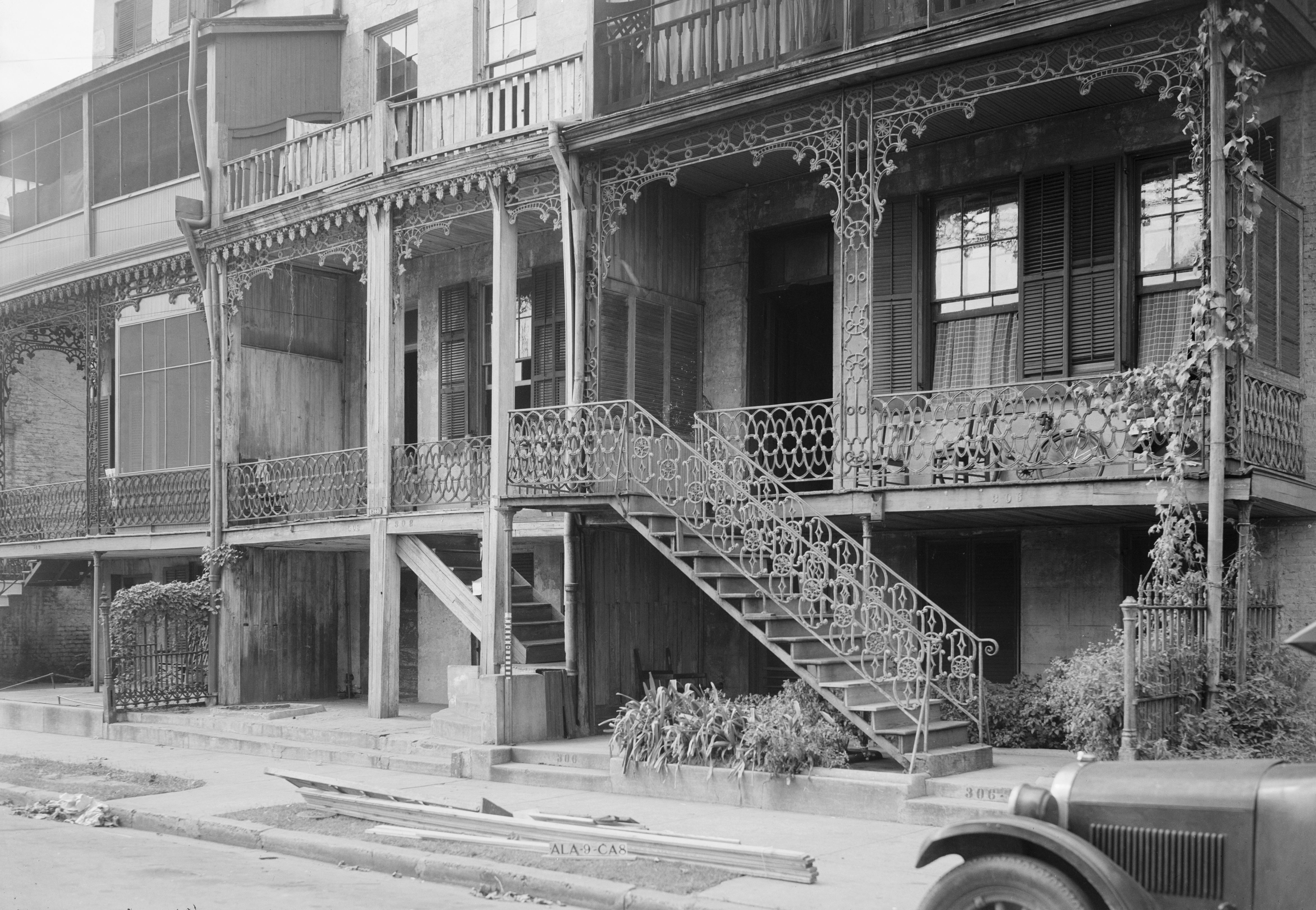
Bloodgood's Row on Monroe Street before demolition

The Conde–Charlotte house and its surroundings became isolated from the rest of the city with the construction of Interstate 10 and urban renewal. Most of the surrounding neighborhood, one of the oldest in Mobile, was demolished to make way for the interstate project. The most notable section of the neighborhood that was destroyed was the early multi-storied townhouses of Bloodgood's Row along Monroe Street. The new construction left only a small one block section of Theatre, Monroe, and Saint Emanuel streets intact afterward, surrounded by a circle of interstate and its associated entrance and exit ramps. With the foundations of Fort Condé being discovered during tunnel construction, a replica fort was rebuilt on the old site after the George Wallace Tunnel was finished. The fort is now a backdrop to the Conde–Charlotte house. In recent years the city has sponsored private redevelopment projects to restore this area into "Fort Condé Village", which has seen the relocation and restoration of period appropriate buildings and the addition of brick streets and gas street lamps.
