= Pierre Le Blond de La Tour =

Pierre le Blond de la Tour (1673–1723/4) was an engineer in French Louisiana who was largely responsible for the layout of early New Orleans. He is credited with performing the first work to improve navigability on an American inland river, and also the first work on constructing levees on the Lower Mississippi River.

== Early life and family ==
De la Tour was a cousin of Jean-Baptiste Le Moyne, Sieur de Bienville, later the governor of Louisiana. He had at least two brothers, who later accompanied him to Louisiana in 1720.

He began his career as a military engineer with the French army in Portugal in 1697. He served under the renowned engineer Vauban, considered one of the finest of the age, whose influence can be seen in De la Tour's later work in Louisiana. He served with the French army in Portugal and Spain until 1709; he was taken prisoner in 1705, released in 1706, and severely injured at the end of this service.

== French Louisiana ==
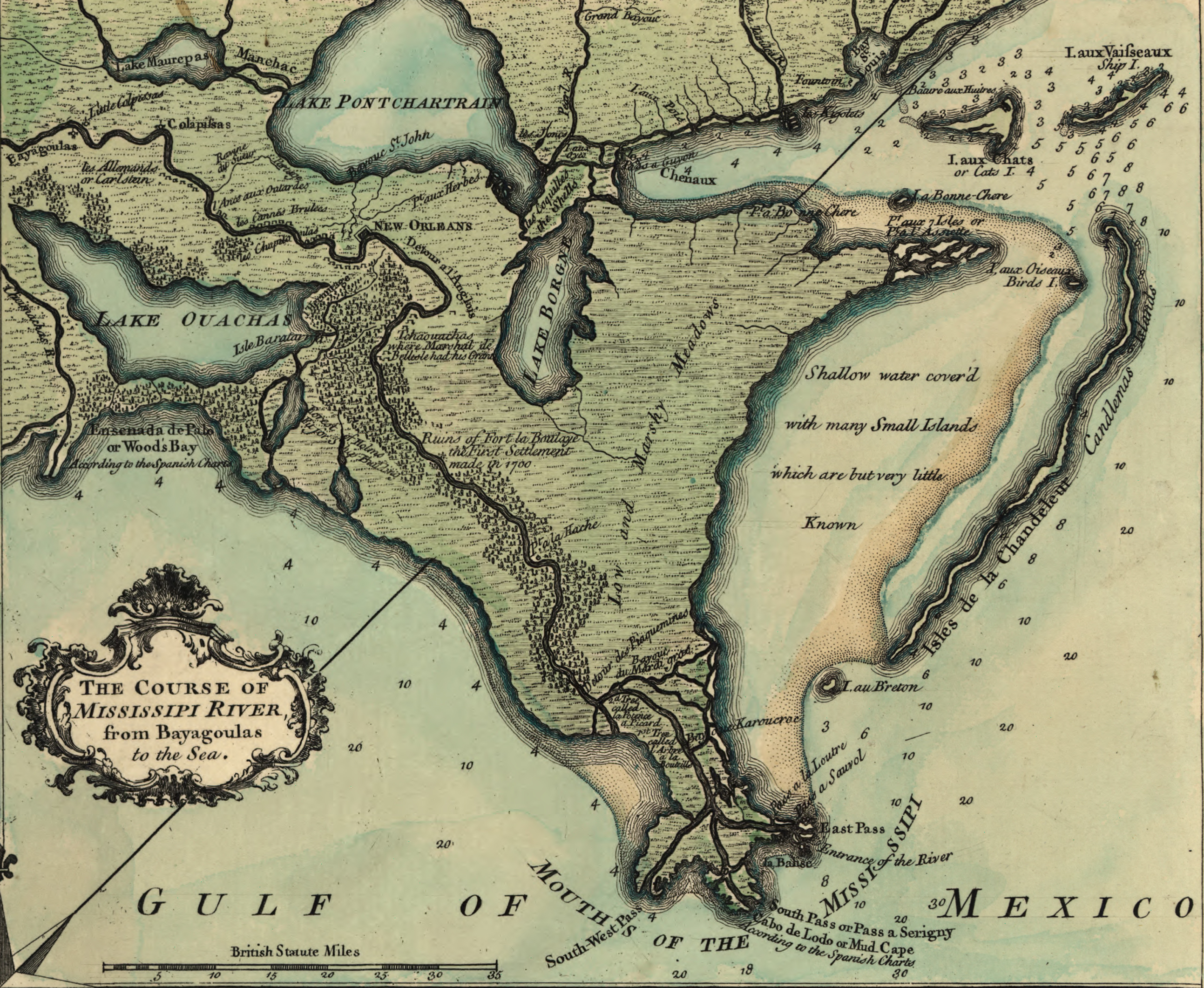
Detail of the map from the de la Tour survey of 1720 as published in 1759, showing the New Orleans area with Lake Borgne, Lake Pontchartrain Basin, and lower Missisissippi River.

At least fifteen engineers, architects, and draftsmen were dispatched to French Louisiana during the early years of the New Orleans settlement, which was quite a large number considering the region's sparse population. De la Tour was one of a group of four voyers de la ville sent to lay out New Orleans. He arrived in Louisiana in December 1720. De la Tour was appointed engineer-in-chief of the colony, and later lieutenant general, second-in-command to Governor Bienville. At some point prior to 1721, De la Tour was made a Chevalier de St. Louis.

After a rise in the Mississippi River left the embryonic New Orleans settlement flooded and brought construction to a halt in 1719, the Company of the Indies relocated its headquarters–against the wishes of Governor Bienville–from New Orleans to New Biloxi. De la Tour had long been a detractor of the New Orleans site and a proponent of Biloxi, and in January 1721 he presented plans for the proposed layout of New Biloxi. The plan called for a rectangular grid plan, surrounding a Place d' Armes.

After construction was able to resume in New Orleans, De la Tour and his assistant, Adrien de Pauger, designed earthen embankments to strengthen the river's natural levees. Around this time, De la Tour observed the Great Louisiana Hurricane of 1722, which he wrote about in a letter; he recorded that it knocked down many buildings but that all of them "were old and provisionally built, and not a single one was in the alignment of the new city and thus would have had to be demolished." The levee planning of De la Tour started in 1717, but it was ten years later that the levee was completed. In 1723, he designed the young city's first hospital.

Apart from Pauger, two notable subordinates of De la Tour were the memoirist Dumont de Montigny and the engineer Ignace Francois Broutin. Montigny (who had also quarreled with Bienville) and De la Tour both wrote letters to Minister of War Claude le Blanc, each denouncing the other, much to the minister's annoyance. De la Tour had apparently intercepted Pauger's initial letter and set a plan to demote him. Broutin would later be known as the designer of the Ursuline Convent.

== Death and legacy ==
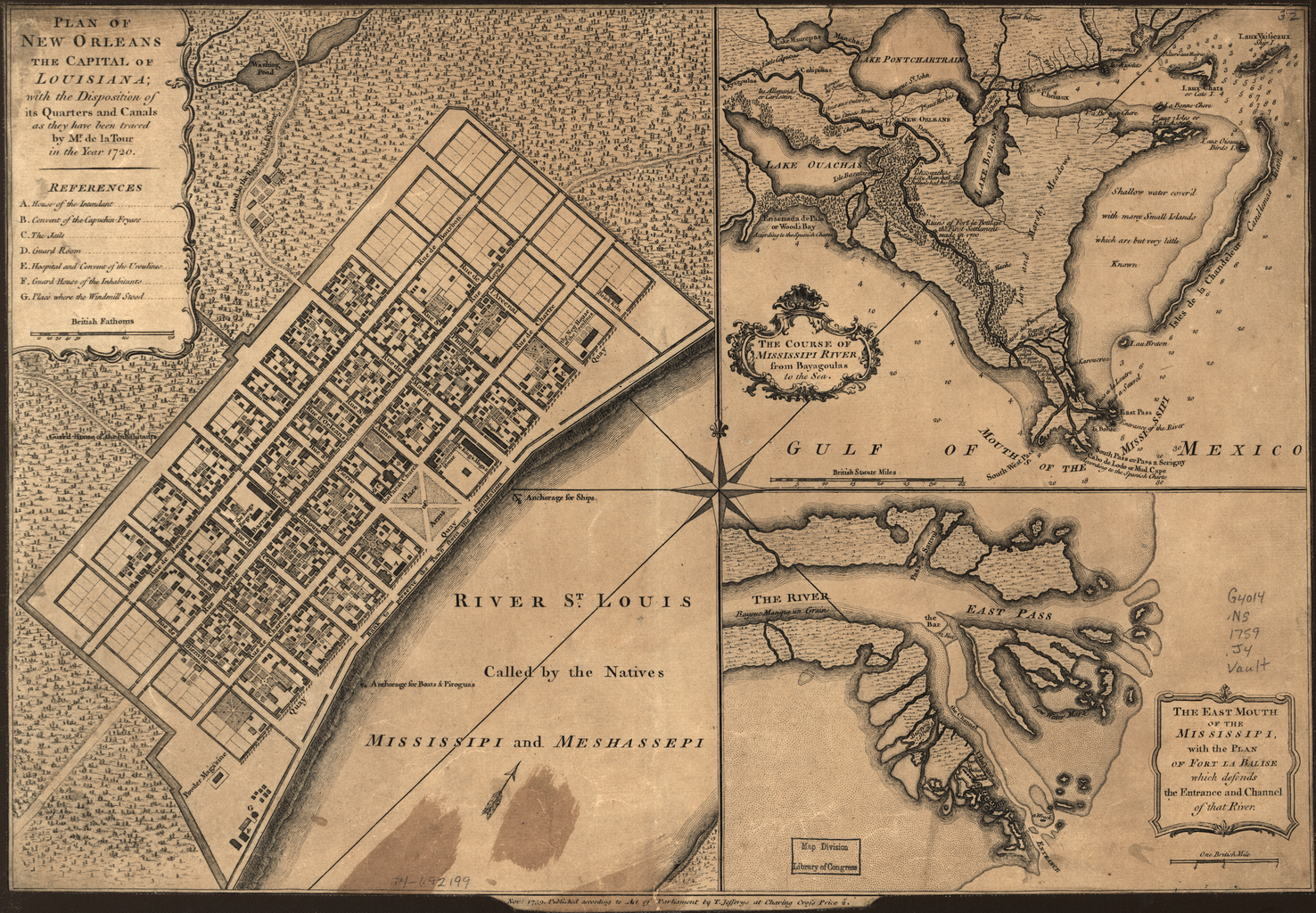
The layout of the Vieux Carre was largely based on De la Tour's plan for New Biloxi.

De la Tour, like many early French settlers in Louisiana, did not survive for long there. He died in October of either 1723 or 1724 after contracting yellow fever. His successor, Adrien de Pauger, laid out the streets of the Vieux Carre largely based on the plans De la Tour prepared for New Biloxi.
