= French ship Pélican (1702) =

History

France
- Name: Pélican

Pélican was a ship in French service for colonial duty in the transport of colonists to French North America.

== History ==
In January 1704, the ship left Loire, France, for La Mobile, La Louisiane, New France. The ship that brought additional pioneers and yellow fever to the French colony of the original Mobile site, arriving in August 1704. The ship brought filles à la casquette to help found the colony with womenfolk for the menfolk; also called Pelican Girls, after the ship they were transported on; and Casket Girls or Cassettes, for the boxes, called casquettes, used to carry their belongings. The yellow fever had been acquired in a stopover in Cuba on the way to Mobile.

== See also ==
- French ship Pélican (1693)
