= Jean-Michel de Lépinay =

Canadian politician

5th French Governor of Louisiana
- In office 1717–1718
- Monarch: Louis XV
- Preceded by: Jean-Baptiste Le Moyne, Sieur de Bienville
- Succeeded by: Jean-Baptiste Le Moyne, Sieur de Bienville

15th French Governor of Grenada
- In office 1718–1721
- Monarch: Louis XV
- Preceded by: Guillaume-Emmanuel-Théodore de Maupeou
- Succeeded by: Jean Balthazard du Houx

Personal details
- Born: c. 1665 Fougères, France
- Died: January 3, 1721 (aged 55–56) Martinique, French West Indies

Military service
- Allegiance: Kingdom of France
- Branch/service: French Navy
- Years of service: 1683–1721
- Awards: Order of St. Louis

Jean-Michel de Lépinay (French pronunciation: [ʒɑ̃ miʃɛl də lepinɛ]; c. 1665 – January 3, 1721) was a French officer in Canada and governor of Louisiana and Grenada.

== Biography ==
Jean-Michel de Lépinay was born in Fougères, Brittany, France. After joining the French Army, Lépinay immigrated to Canada as an ensign in 1687 and was promoted to lieutenant in 1690 and lieutenant in pied in 1691.

In 1691, he was appointed captain of the port of Quebec at the request of Governor General of New France Louis de Buade de Frontenac. He served in this role until April 20, 1695, at which time he returned to France to address family affairs.

On March 12, 1716, Lépinay was next appointed governor of Louisiana by Antoine Crozat, the royally appointed administrator of the colony. Before leaving France, Lépinay sought and received the Cross of St. Louis, which, he argued, would increase his prestige in the eyes of the native tribes of the region. Lépinay left France on board the ship "Ludlow", which he commanded, on December 21, and took office in February 1717. He came to the colony with a new Commissary-Commissioner, 50 new colonists, and three companies of infantry. However, Lepinay soon found himself at odds with Jean-Baptiste Le Moyne de Bienville, twice governor and an influential leader in the colony. Failing to show any improvement over the administration of the former governor, Sieur de Cadillac, Lepinay was replaced as governor by Bienville after Crozat successfully petitioned to be released from his agreement to develop the colony.

In November 1717, Lépinay was appointed governor of Grenada. On May 18, 1720, he left the island of Aix en Atalanta to join his new government in Grenada, arriving on June 28. He died on January 3, 1721, in Fort Royal (Martinique).

Government offices
Preceded by Jean-Baptiste Le Moyne de Bienville	French Governor of Louisiana; 1717–1718	Succeeded by Jean-Baptiste Le Moyne de Bienville
