= Sauvolle =

Governor of French Louisiana (1671–1701)

1st French Governor of Louisiana
- In office 1699–1701
- Monarch: Louis XIV
- Preceded by: none
- Succeeded by: Jean-Baptiste Le Moyne, Sieur de Bienville

Personal details
- Born: c. 1671 France
- Died: August 22, 1701 Fort Maurepas, Louisiana, New France

Military service
- Allegiance: (Kingdom of France)
- Branch/service: French Navy

The sieur de Sauvolle (c. 1671 – 1701), known for certainty only by his surname, (Note: His name is also recorded as Sauvole, de Sauvolle, and Sauvolle de la Villantry) was the first governor of the French territory of Louisiana. He accompanied the brothers Iberville and Bienville on their first voyage to Louisiana in 1699 and their explorations inland. On May 2, 1699, he was appointed commander of the new Fort Maurepas, and in January 1700 he became the territory's governor.

As governor, he worked to develop friendly relations with the Biloxi, Pascagoula, and Mobile indigenous peoples, and oversaw construction of Fort De La Boulaye to guard against attempts by British traders to establish a foothold on the Mississippi River.

His journal is one of the earliest sources for the history of the region. Sauvolle died suddenly, likely from yellow fever, on August 21, 1701.

Despite the survival of his journal entries and the journals of Iberville, almost nothing is known about Sauvolle: neither his ancestry nor the year of his birth, nor even much of his name. Iberville mentions him as "M. de Sauvolle". Statements by various historians that his first name was Antoine or François-Marie, that he was the sieur de la Villantry, or that he was a brother of Iberville and Bienville are assertions not supported by multiple sources.

== Notes ==
Government offices
Preceded by none	French Governor of Louisiana; 1699–1701	Succeeded by Jean-Baptiste Le Moyne de Bienville
