= Jean-Baptiste Le Moyne de Bienville =

French colonial governor of Louisiana

Jean-Baptiste Le Moyne Sieur de Bienville
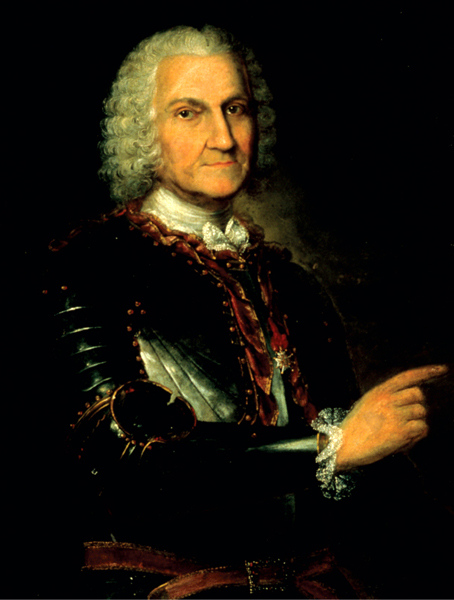
- Portrait by unknown artist

2nd, 4th, 6th, and 9th Colonial Governor of French Louisiana
- In office 1701–1713
- Monarch: Louis XIV
- Preceded by: Sauvolle de la Villantry
- Succeeded by: Antoine Laumet de La Mothe, sieur de Cadillac
- In office 1717–1718
- Monarch: Louis XV
- Preceded by: Antoine de la Mothe Cadillac
- Succeeded by: Jean-Michel de Lepinay
- In office 1724–1728
- Monarch: Louis XV
- Preceded by: Jean-Michel de Lepinay
- Succeeded by: Pierre Dugué de Boisbriant
- In office 1733–1743
- Monarch: Louis XV
- Preceded by: Étienne Perier
- Succeeded by: Pierre François de Rigaud, Marquis de Vaudreuil-Cavagnal

Personal details
- Born: February 23, 1680 Fort Ville-Marie, New France
- Died: March 7, 1767 (aged 87) Paris, Kingdom of France
- Resting place: Cimetière de Montmartre
- Known for: Founder of New Orleans

Military service
- Allegiance: Kingdom of France
- Branch/service: French Navy
- Years of service: 1692–1758
- Rank: Lieutenant
- Battles/wars: King William's War; Chickasaw Wars
- Awards: Order of Saint Louis

Coat of Arms of Jean-Baptiste Le Moyne de Bienville

Jean-Baptiste Le Moyne de Bienville (French pronunciation: [ʒɑ̃ batist lə mwan də bjɛ̃vil]; /lə ˈmɔɪn də biˈɛnvɪl/; February 23, 1680 – March 7, 1767), also known as Sieur de Bienville, was a French-Canadian colonial administrator in New France. Born in Montreal, he was an early governor of French Louisiana, appointed four separate times during 1701–1743. He was the younger brother of explorer Pierre Le Moyne d'Iberville.

== Early life ==
Jean-Baptiste Le Moyne was born in early 1680 in Fort Ville-Marie, the frontier village of what is now Montreal, the twelfth of fourteen children to Catherine Primot and Charles le Moyne. He was baptized on February 23, 1680, which is usually given as his birthdate since the exact day is unknown. His father had left France and established a prosperous fur trade business in Canada, earning a title of nobility from the King. Le Moyne was educated at Sulpician Seminary in Montreal and at the age of twelve, entered into the French Navy as a midshipman.

He served in the Navy under the command of his brother, Pierre Le Moyne, and in 1697, participated in campaigns to push out English fishermen from Newfoundland and Hudson Bay during King William's War. He was injured in battle is 1698 in an effort to capture Port Hudson. After the war, he accompanied his brother to France in order to prepare for an exploratory mission to base of the Mississippi River Delta.

== Exploration in the New World ==
At the age of nineteen, Bienville joined his brother Iberville on an expedition to establish the colony of Louisiana. In 1699, the group explored the Gulf of Mexico coastline as far as Mobile Bay, which was too shallow to go further. At the site of Belle Fontaine, they discovered an artesian spring bubbling and leaping from the beach; this spring is now 300–400 feet out in Mobile Bay. Bienville played a significant role in charting the coast near Mobile, Alabama. He also discovered the Chandeleur Islands off the coast of Louisiana, as well as Cat Island and Ship Island off the Mississippi coast, before moving westward to sail up the mouth of the Mississippi River. Eventually, the expedition reached the modern-day site of Baton Rouge and False River. In April 1699, before heading back to France, Iberville established the first settlement of the Louisiana colony: Fort Maurepas or Old Biloxi, at present-day Ocean Springs, Mississippi. He appointed Sauvolle de la Villantry as the governor and made Bienville lieutenant.

Following Iberville's departure, Bienville took another expedition up the Mississippi River and encountered English ships at what is now known as English Turn. Upon hearing of this encounter on his return, Iberville ordered Bienville to establish a settlement along the Mississippi River at the first solid ground he could find. Fifty miles upriver, Bienville established Fort de la Boulaye.

== Co-founder of Mobile ==
On the recommendations of his brother, Bienville moved the majority of the settlers to a new settlement in what is now Alabama on the west side of the Mobile River, called Fort Louis de la Mobile (or "Mobille"). He also established a deepwater port nearby on Dauphin Island for the colony, as Mobile Bay and the Mobile River were too shallow for seagoing vessels. The population of the colony fluctuated over the next few years. In 1704, in part due to fear that fraternization of French soldiers with native females might lead to conflict, Bienville arranged for the arrival of twenty-four young French women. By tradition the young ladies were selected from convents, though most were likely from poor families. Because they traveled to the New World with their possessions in small trunks known as cassettes, they are known in local histories as the casquette girls in early accounts and by the English translation of casket girls in later tradition.

The young ladies were lodged in Bienville's home under the care of his housekeeper, a French-Canadian woman known as Madame Langlois. (By tradition she was a widowed cousin to Bienville and his brothers, but there is no confirmation of this.) Madame Langlois had learned from local native tribes the arts of cooking local produce and imparted this knowledge to her charges in what is generally heralded as the origin of Creole cuisine. The names and fates of most of the Casquette Girls is uncertain, but at least some remained in the colony and married French soldiers as intended, the first recorded birth of a white child occurring in 1705.

The population of the colony fluctuated over the next generation, growing to 281 by 1708, but diminishing to 178 two years later due to disease. In 1709, a great flood overflowed Fort Louis de la Mobile: because of this and the outbreaks of disease, Bienville ordered the settlement to move downriver to the present site of Mobile, Alabama in 1711 where another wooden Fort Louis was built. By 1712, when Antoine Crozat took over administration of Louisiana by royal appointment, the colony boasted a population of 400 persons. In 1713, a new governor arrived from France, and Bienville moved west where, in 1716, he established Fort Rosalie on the present site of Natchez, Mississippi. The new governor, Antoine Laumet de La Mothe, sieur de Cadillac, did not last long due to mismanagement and a lack of growth in the colony. He was recalled to France in 1716, and Bienville again took the helm as governor, serving the office for less than a year until the new governor, Jean-Michel de Lepinay, arrived from France. Lepinay's tenure was short lived, however, as Crozat had relinquished control of the colony and its administration to John Law and his Company of the Indies. In 1718, Bienville found himself once again governor of Louisiana, and it was during this term that Bienville established the city of New Orleans, Louisiana.

== Father of New Orleans ==
Bienville wrote to the Directors of the Company in 1717 that he had discovered a crescent bend in the Mississippi River which he felt was safe from tidal surges and hurricanes and proposed that the new capital of the colony be built there. Permission was granted, and Bienville founded New Orleans in the spring of 1718 (May 7 has become the traditional date to mark the anniversary, but the actual day is unknown). By 1719, a sufficient number of huts and storage houses had been built that Bienville began moving supplies and troops from Mobile. Following disagreements with the chief engineer of the colony, Pierre Le Blond de La Tour, Bienville ordered an assistant engineer, Adrien de Pauger, to draw up plans for the new city in 1720. In 1721, Pauger drew up the eleven-by-seven block rectangle now known as the French Quarter or the Vieux Carré. After moving into his new home on the site of what is now the Custom House, Bienville named the new city "La Nouvelle-Orléans" in honor of Philippe II, Duke of Orléans, the Prince Regent of France. New Orleans became the capital of French Louisiana by 1723, during Bienville's third term.

== Father of Biloxi ==
In 1719, during the War of the Quadruple Alliance (1718–1720), Bienville had moved the capital of French Louisiana from Mobile near the battlefront with Spanish Pensacola back to Fort Maurepas (Old Biloxi). However, due to shifting sand bars, the settlement was moved across Biloxi Bay to found New Biloxi (or Nouvelle-Biloxi or Bilocci), in 1719. After the move, Fort Maurepas was burned (in the French custom to avoid resettlement by enemy forces). Also during 1719, the under-construction New Orleans had been entirely flooded (6 inches or higher), with the realization that higher ground or levees would be needed for the inland port of that Crescent City. The governing council wanted to keep the capital on the Gulf of Mexico at Biloxi. However, the sandy soil around Biloxi complicated agriculture, and storms also shifted sands into Biloxi harbor, while the New Orleans site could be considered a deepwater port, closer to agricultural lands. Eventually, in June 1722, Bienville began moving the capital to New Orleans, completing the move in August 1722. The year 1723 was the first full year with New Orleans as capital of French Louisiana.

== Chickasaw Indian War ==
In 1725, Bienville was recalled to France. He left the colony in the hands of Pierre Dugué de Boisbriant, succeeded by Étienne Perier. Bienville resumed his post in Louisiana in 1733. This last term in office would be one of conflict, as relations with the Chickasaw had deteriorated. Bienville immediately began planning for a two-pronged offensive. He ordered the Governor of the Illinois District Pierre d'Artaguette with all available force from that area to meet him in Chickasaw country to launch a coordinated attack. At the event, Bienville arrived late, so d'Artaguette attacked independently on March 25, 1736, and was crushed. After weeks of preparation, Bienville attacked from the south on May 26, and himself was bloodily repulsed. Humiliated, Bienville organized a second campaign and collected his forces at Chickasaw Bluff in 1739. The Chickasaws sued for peace, and a treaty was signed with Bienville in April 1740. After two campaigns falling so far short of expectations, Bienville requested that he be relieved of his duties as governor.

While waiting for a new governor to arrive, Bienville helped establish a Charity Hospital which had been endowed by a sailor named Jean Louis. He also headed a relief effort when two hurricanes hit the Gulf Coast in the fall of 1740. The new governor arrived in 1743, and Bienville sailed back to France. However, even in France, he did what he could to aid the colony he had worked so long to build, seeking unsuccessfully to prevent the transfer of the colony from France to Spain. Bienville died in Paris in 1767.

== Legacy ==
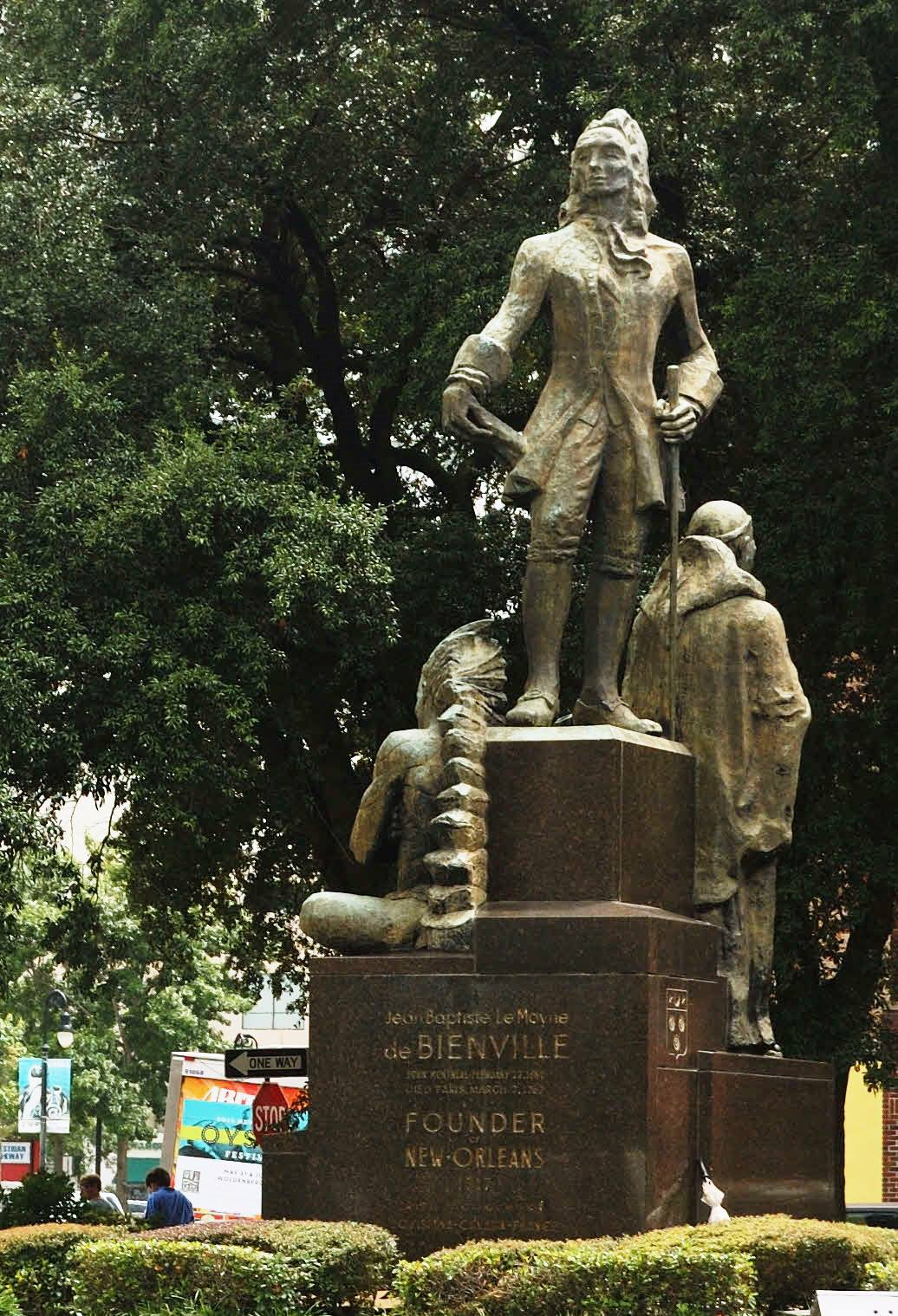
Monument to Bienville in New Orleans

Bienville is often described as "the Father of Louisiana."

A monument was erected in New Orleans to recognize Bienville's role as founder of the city by the Louisiana Purchase Sesquicentennial Commission. Cast in 1955 by Angela Gregory, the monument features Bienville atop a pedestal facing north. On the east face, to his right, sits a Native American. To his south, a priest. On the west side of the monument, Gregory included the Le Moyne coat of arms.

A statue of Bienville made by Albert Reiker is in the Louisiana State Capitol in Baton Rouge.

The Civil War era steamers the USS Bienville and the CSS Bienville were both named for him.

Bienville Parish, and the town of Bienville, are both named for him.

Bienville Square in Mobile, Alabama is named for him.

Bienville National Forest in Mississippi is named for him.

Lake Bienville in Quebec, Canada is named for him.

== Sources ==
- Bienville, Jean-Baptiste Le Moyne, Sieur de. "Account made by Bienville of his Expedition against the Chickasaws." trans. Caroline and Eleanor Dunn in Indiana's First War. Indiana Historical Society Publications 8. Indianapolis: Wm. B. Burford, 1924. 75–123.
- Walter G. Cowen, Jack B. McGuire, Louisiana Governors: Rulers, Rascals, and Reformers, University Press of Mississippi, 2008. ISBN 978-1-934110-90-4
- Davis, Edwin Adams. Louisiana the Pelican State. Baton Rouge: Louisiana State University Press, 1961. LCCN 59-9088.
- Hauck, Philomena (1998). Bienville: Father of Louisiana. Lafayette, Louisiana: Center for Louisiana Studies, University of Southwest Louisiana. ISBN 9781887366250.

Government offices
Preceded by Sauvolle de la Villantry	French Governor of Louisiana; 1701–1713	Succeeded by Antoine Laumet de La Mothe, sieur de Cadillac
Preceded by Antoine Laumet de La Mothe, sieur de Cadillac	French Governor of Louisiana; 1717–1718	Succeeded by Jean-Michel de Lepinay
Preceded by Jean-Michel de Lepinay	French Governor of Louisiana; 1718–1724	Succeeded by Pierre Dugué de Boisbriant
Preceded by Étienne Perier	French Governor of Louisiana; 1733–1743	Succeeded by Pierre François de Rigaud, Marquis de Vaudreuil-Cavagnal
