= Casquette girl =

French woman brought to Louisiana for marriage

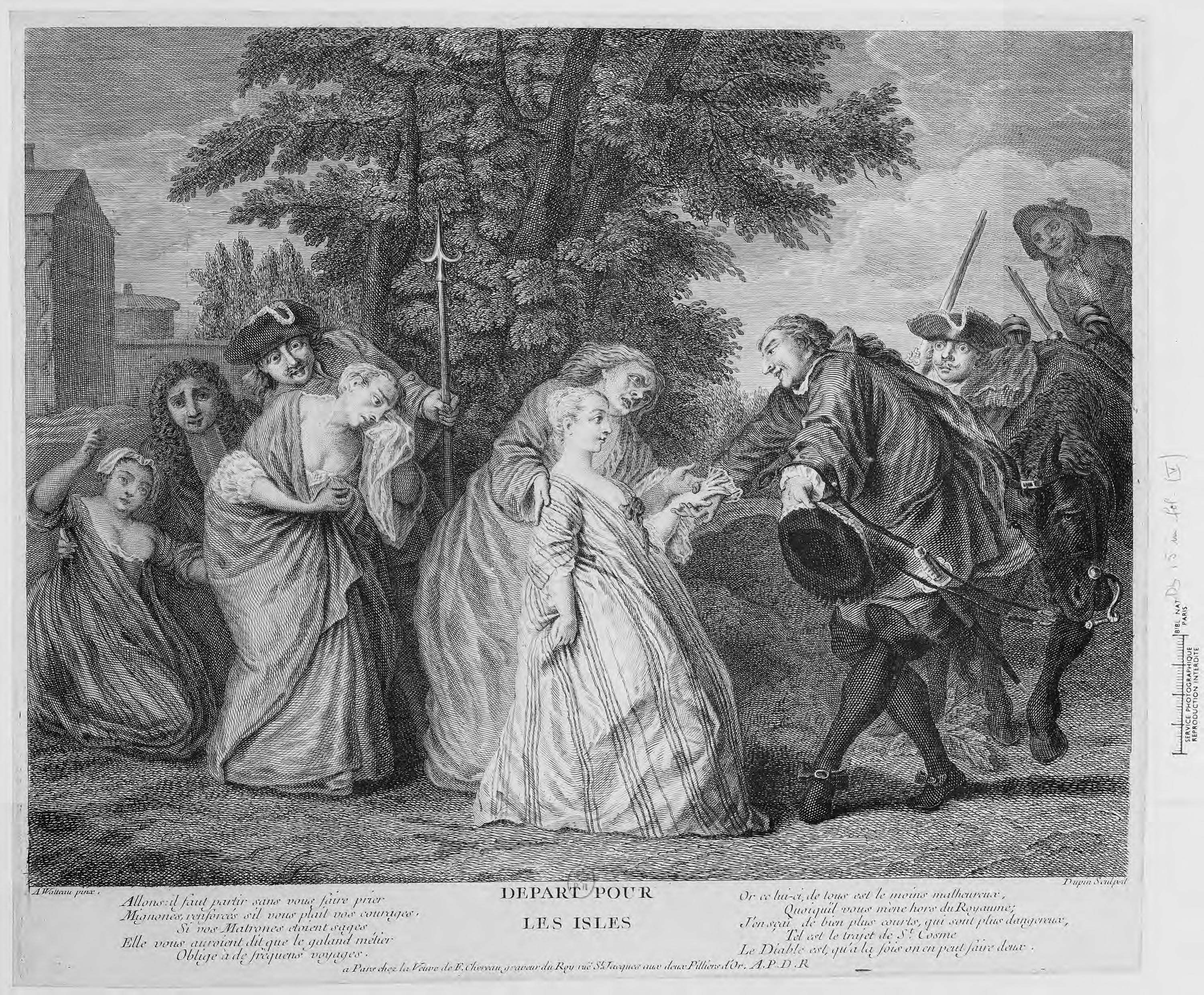
Engraving depicting the departure of "comfort girls" to the New World.

A casquette girl (French: fille à la cassette) but also known historically as a casket girl or a Pelican girl, was a woman brought from France to the French colonies of Louisiana to marry. The name derives from the small chests, known as casquettes, in which they carried their clothes.

== History ==
The French policy of sending young women known as King's Daughters (French: filles du roi) to their colonies for marriage goes back to the 17th-century. Young women were sent to Canada, Louisiana and the French West Indies.

Later women, called correction girls, were supplied to the colonists by raking the streets of Paris for undesirables, or by emptying the houses of correction. France also sent women convicted along with their debtor husbands, and in 1719, deported 209 women felons "who were of a character to be sent to the French settlement in Louisiana". The women sent to the West Indies were often from poor houses in France, but reputed to be former prostitutes from La Salpêtrière. In 1713 and again in 1743, the authorities in Saint-Domingue complained that Paris sent the settlers unsuitable former prostitutes as wives, and the practice was discontinued in the mid-18th century.

The casquette girls, however, were conspicuous by reason of their virtue. They were recruited from church charitable institutions (usually orphanages and convents) and although poor, were guaranteed to be virgins. It later became a matter of pride on the Gulf Coast to show descent from them. The first casquette girls reached Mobile, Alabama, in 1704, Biloxi, Mississippi, in 1719, and New Orleans in 1728.

The 23 Pelican Girls arrived first on Massacre Island in late July then took shallow-draft boats up Mobile Bay to 27 Mile Bluff weighing anchor on August 1, 1704. They had sailed from France in April of that year on the ship Le Pélican. A stop in Cuba had resulted in many of the crew and young women receiving mosquito bites and thus becoming infected with yellow fever. Two of the young women died soon after arrival and the epidemic spread throughout the fort, even taking the life of adventurer Henri de Tonti. Disease notwithstanding, most of the young women were married to men of their choosing within a month. All of the girls were between 14 and 19 years old.

Unhappy with new husbands who spent much of their time in the woods, not building new homes or planting them gardens, the girls staged what became known as the “Petticoat Rebellion.” Until they were provided a roof and food they refused “bed and board.” The men eventually came around.

Historian Joan Martin maintains that there is little documentation that casket girls, considered among the ancestors of white French Creoles, were sent to Louisiana. Dr. Marcia Zug argues that there was, in fact, no evidence to support the fact that these women existed as such. The Ursuline order of nuns supposedly chaperoned the casket girls until they married, but the order has denied this. Martin suggests this was a myth, and that interracial relationships occurred from the beginning of the encounter among Europeans, Native Americans and Africans. She also writes that some Creole families who today identify as white had ancestors during the colonial period who were African or multiracial, and whose descendants married white over generations.

In later years, it was common for Louisianans to claim that their descent was through the casquette girls rather than the correction girls, and later researchers would remark that while none of the correction girls had apparently had children, the casquette girls had been remarkably fertile.

== Cultural impact ==
=== Fiction ===
- They inspired Victor Herbert to write Naughty Marietta, which was turned into a musical in 1935.
- In the 1947 movie The Foxes of Harrow, Maureen Sullivan is costumed as a Casquette Girl during a ball.
- The French, a novel by W. Maureen Miller, is about Madeline, a young French girl who is sponsored by a convent and sent to Louisiana to become the bride of a pioneering colonist.
- In the spin off show from The Vampire Diaries, The Originals, in episode 10 season 1 casquette girls were mentioned to be meeting “New Orleans gentlemen” and spoke only French.
- They were used as the inspiration for the title and as part of the plot in The Casquette Girls, a young adult novel by Alys Arden.

=== Music ===
- Musicians Phaedra Greene, Elsa Greene, and Ryan Graveface formed the Savannah, Georgia-based band Casket Girls.
- In 2018, Gregory Hancock Dance Theatre performed the ballet "The Casket Girls" in Carmel, Indiana, with music composed by Cory Gabel and choreography by Gregory Hancock. It was inspired by the original casquette girls, telling the origin of vampires in New Orleans. The Gregory Hancock Dance Theatre performed the ballet again in October 2025. Guest vocalist Tessa Gibbons performed a song onstage during a pas de deux.

=== Mardi Gras ===
On New Year's Day 2021 a group of women in Mobile, Alabama, formed the “Pelican Girls” as an homage to the first casquette girls to arrive on the Gulf Coast on Le Pelican in the summer of 1704. The ladies are a masked marching society donning 18th century dress and distributing trinkets made and personalized by the members themselves. Their membership is limited to 23 and each adopts the name of one of the original 23 girls. They currently participate in the Massacre Island Secret Society parade on Dauphin Island, Alabama, and the Joe Cain Procession in Mobile.

== See also ==
- King's Daughters
- First white child
- Órfãs do Rei
