= Fort Maurepas =

1699 French settlement in Southeastern USA

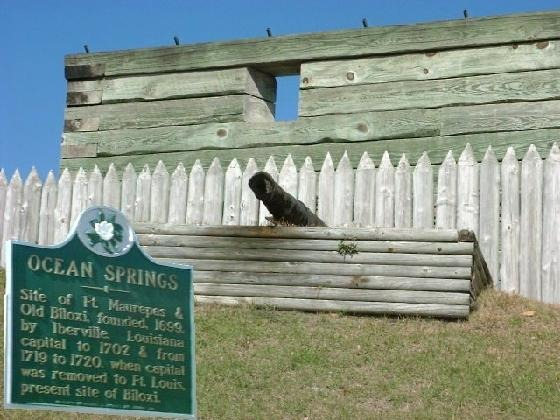
20th century replica of Fort Maurepas

Fort Maurepas, later known as Old Biloxi, was a fort developed in colonial French Louisiana (New France) in April 1699 along the Gulf of Mexico (at present-day Ocean Springs, Mississippi). Fort Maurepas was designated temporarily as the capital of Louisiana (New France) in 1699. The capital was moved from Ocean Springs to Mobile (in present-day Alabama) in 1710, then to New Orleans in 1723 on the Mississippi River. Government buildings in the latter city were still under construction.

== Toponymy ==
The military camp was known in French as Fort Maurepas to honor Louis Phélypeaux, comte de Maurepas from the city of Maurepas. The name Biloxi in French was spelled Bilocci, in a transliteration of the name of the local Native American tribe. It appeared as "Fort Bilocci" on English maps updated circa the years 1710/1725.

French Louisiana (part of New France) was known in French as La Louisiane in colonial times. In modern times it is referred to as La Louisiane française to distinguish it from the modern state of Louisiana (also "Louisiane" in French).

== History ==
The fort was completed on May 1, 1699 under direction of French explorer Pierre Le Moyne d'Iberville, who sailed for France on May 4. He appointed his teenage brother Jean-Baptiste Le Moyne de Bienville as second in command after the French commandant Sauvolle de la Villantry (c.1671–1701).

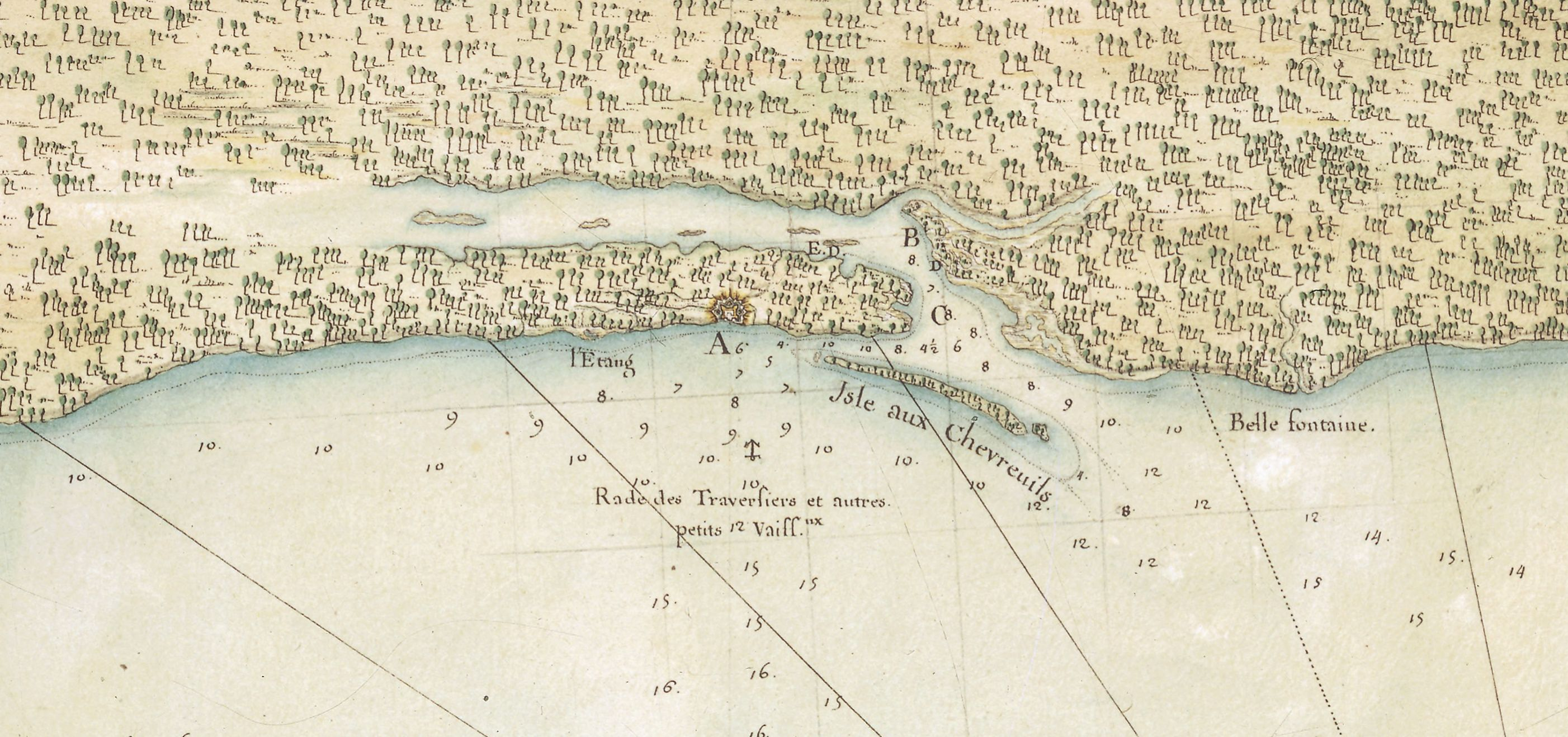
Vieux Biloxi (Fort Maurepas) on the Biloxi Coast (site B on the map)

M. d'Iberville originally intended to establish a French colony along the Mississippi River. However, because of its flooding, he had been unable to find a suitable location during his first voyage of discovery up the Mississippi in March 1699. He returned from his river journey on April 1, and spent another week in searching the shores adjacent to Ship Island, where the fleet had been anchored.

On Tuesday, April 7, 1699, d'Iberville and Surgeres observed "an elevated place that appeared very suitable". This spot was on the northeast shore of Biloxi Bay. They had found the bay was 7–8 feet (2 m) deep. They decided to construct the fort there, as they "could find no spot more convenient, and our provisions were failing, we could search no longer". On Wednesday, April 8, they commenced to cut away the trees preparatory for construction of the fort. All the men "worked vigorously", and by the end of the month, the fort had been finished. They also carved what is known as the Iberville stone, claiming the site for France. This is now held by the Louisiana State Museum.

The expedition journal reported:

In the meantime, the boats were actively engaged transporting the powder, guns, and ammunition, as well as the live stock, such as bulls, cows, hogs, fowls, turkeys, etc. . . . The fort was made with four bastions, two of them squared logs, from 2-3 feet [1 m] thick, placed one upon the other, with embrasures for port holes, and a ditch all around. The other two bastions were stockaded with heavy timbers which took four men to lift one of them. Twelve guns were mounted.

— Historical Jour, of d'Iberville's expedition

The best men were selected to remain at the fort, including detachments of soldiers to place with the Canadians (the French also had a colony in what is now Quebec and along the upper Mississippi River) and workmen, and sailors to serve on the gunboats. Altogether about 100 people were left at Fort Maurepas while Iberville sailed back to France on May 4, 1699. Those remaining included:

- M. de Sauvolle de la Villantry, lieutenant of a company and naval ensign of the frigate Le Marin, was left in command as governor.
- Bienville, king's lieutenant of the marine guard of the frigate La Badine was next in command.
- Le Vasseur de Boussouelle, a Canadian, was major.
- De Bordenac was chaplain, and M. Care was surgeon.
- Also: two captains, two cannoniers, four sailors, eighteen filibusters, ten mechanics, 6 masons, 13 Canadians, and 20 sub-officers and soldiers who comprised the garrison.

Few of the colonists were experienced with agriculture, and the colony never became self-sustaining. The climate and soil were different than they were familiar with. On the return of d'Iberville to Old Biloxi in January 1700, he brought with him sixty Canadian immigrants and a large supply of provisions and stores. On this second voyage, he was instructed:

to breed the Buffalo at Biloxi; to seek for pearls; to examine the wild mulberry with the view to silk [silk worms on leaves]; the timber for shipbuilding, and to seek for mines. Expeditions in search of gold, jewels and valuable furs were the main goals of the colonists. They made thorough explorations of the Mississippi River and the surrounding country.

In 1700, Le Sueur was sent to the upper Mississippi with 20 men to establish a fort in the Sioux country. His government intended to take over the copper mines of the Sioux Indians in the interests of France. Meanwhile, the French had established forts and settlements in the Illinois country. Learning of the French colony at Old Biloxi, Canadians came by the boatload down the Mississippi from the upper country (today's Quebec).

Fathers Davion and Montigny, accompanied by a few Frenchmen, were the first visitors at the fort, having made the journey downriver in canoes. In May 1700, the settlers were visited by M. Sagan, a traveler from Canada. He carried a request from the French minister to the governor M. de Sauvolle, asking that Sagan be furnished with 24 pirogues and 100 Canadians in order to explore the Missouri River and its branches, a major tributary of the Mississippi that has its confluence at what later developed as Saint Louis. During the absence of d'Iberville, his young brother Bienville made further expeditions to try to secure the prosperity of the colony. But the colonists suffered from tropical diseases of the region: many died from yellow fever, including the governor, M. de Sauvolle, who died in the summer of 1701. Bienville became ranking chief in command, and acted as commandant.

On September 16, 1700, a party of Choctaw warriors arrived at Biloxi, asking for French troops to help them fight against the Chickasaw, their traditional enemies among native groups. The Choctaw during this period had 40 villages, with more than 5,000 warriors. On October 25, 20 Mobile natives arrived at Fort Maurepas. They were said to have about 400 fighting men.

On December 18, 1701, a shallop arrived from the Spanish settlement at Pensacola to the east, with the news that d'Iberville and Serigny had reached there with the king's ships, the Renommée of fifty guns, and the Palmier of 44 guns. This was welcome news to the garrison, which had been living for more than 3 months on little more than corn. They had lost more than 60 men due to disease, leaving only 150 persons in the colony. Bienville was ordered to evacuate Biloxi, and move to a settlement on the Mobile River.

On January 5, 1702, Bienville departed for the Mobile River, leaving 20 men under the command of M. de Boisbriant as garrison at the fort. At Dauphin Island, Bienville met with his brothers de Serigny and Chateaugue, who had arrived with a detachment of sailors and workmen. They were to build a magazine for storage of goods and provisions which had been brought from France. On January 16th, Bienville commenced to build the Fort Louis de la Mobile, about 12 leagues above the present city of Mobile, on the right bank of the river. It was the official center of the Gulf Coast colony for the next nine years, until the new Fort Conde was built. (Mobile city developed around it.)

In 1717, when the channel at Dauphine island (present-day Dauphin Island) had become choked with sand, de l'Épinay and de Bienville decided to make use of the harbor at Ship Island. They ordered a new fort to be constructed on the mainland opposite, selecting a place one league west of Old Biloxi for a site across Biloxi Bay. The transport ship Dauphine, commanded by M. Berranger, had arrived with many carpenters and masons. They built the new fort, known as New Biloxi (Nouveau-Biloxi) and also as Fort Louis. In 1719, Fort Maurepas (at Old Biloxi) was burned; it was never reconstructed by the French. Another fort and magazines were also constructed on Ship Island, in the Gulf of Mexico.

In 1719, the administrative capital of French Louisiana was moved to Old Biloxi from Mobile (or Mobille), during the War of the Quadruple Alliance (1718–1720) against Spain. Due to hurricanes and shifting sand bars blocking harbor waters during the early 18th century, the capital of French Louisiana was moved from Mobile to Nouveau-Biloxi (present-day Biloxi), across Biloxi Bay. However, later in the same year, Fort Maurepas (at Old Biloxi) burned. It was never reconstructed.

Later, during June–August 1722, the capital was moved again, by colonial governor Bienville, from Biloxi to deeper waters in the Mississippi River at a new inland harbor town named La Nouvelle-Orléans (New Orleans), built for the purpose during 1718-1722.

In modern times, a replica of Fort Maurepas was built at the site, then within the town of Ocean Springs, Mississippi. It was badly damaged by Hurricane Katrina in August 2005, when all coastal areas of Mississippi were devastated by a storm tide exceeding 30 feet (9 m), with waves even higher.

=== During Hurricane Katrina ===
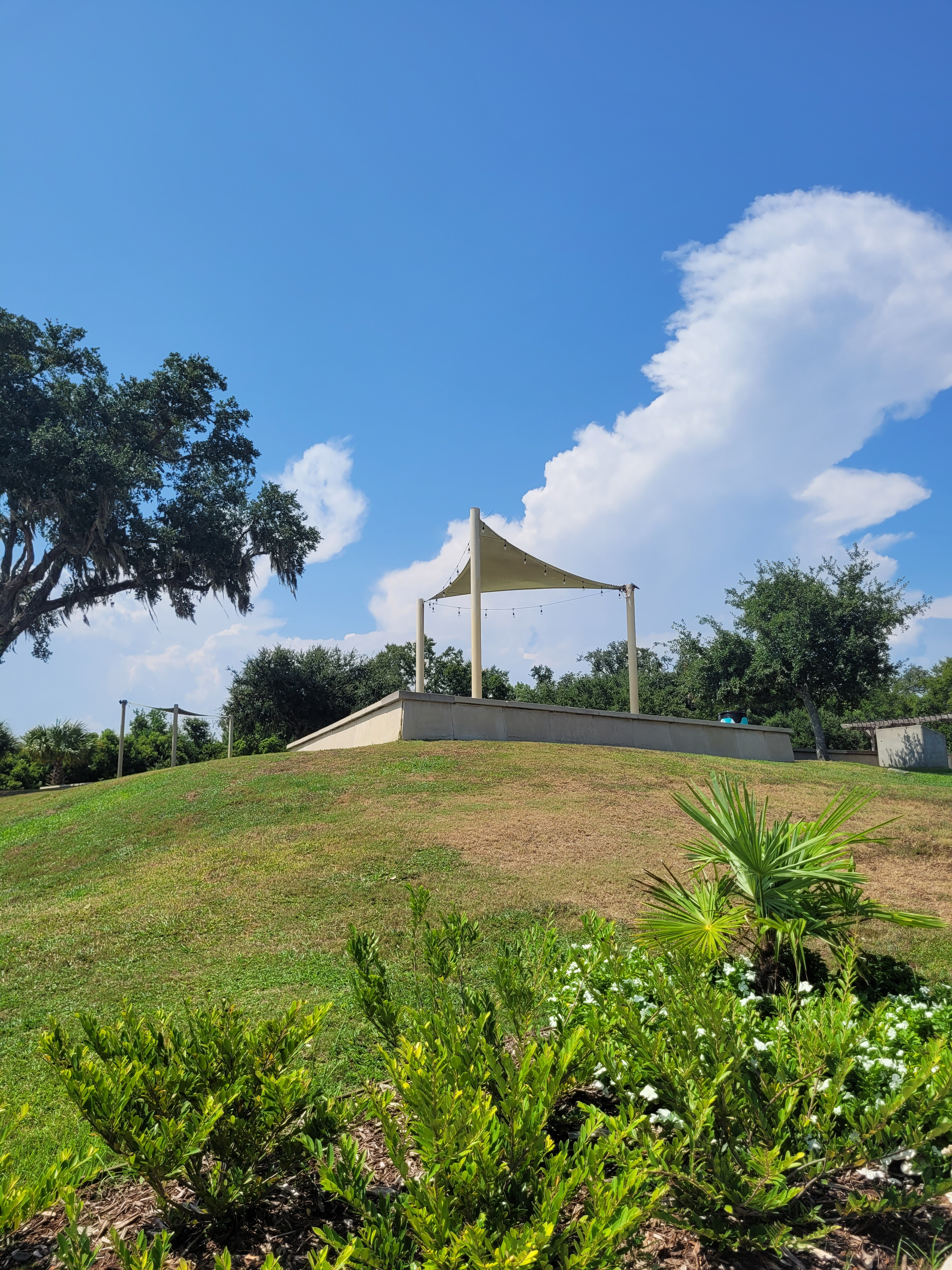
Fort Maurepas Park in 2023

A replica of the wooden Fort Maurepas was built on front beach about a mile from the original site (which is on private property) in the 20th century and was open to the public. It was badly damaged by Hurricane Katrina on August 29, 2005, when coastal Mississippi was devastated by a storm surge exceeding 30 feet (9 m) plus higher waves. Within a few hours, all coastal towns were flooded more than 90%. Residents who had not evacuated, survived by swimming to treetops or roof lines of taller buildings.

A park has since been constructed at the site of the fort. It includes a playground, a splash pad, a stage, a two-story structure with a viewing platform overlooking the beach, public restrooms, and an eco-friendly parking lot. The construction included improvements of pathways along the beach, and to the sailors memorial, crosswalks, and fire pits. It provides access to parking on the opposite side of the Biloxi Bay Bridge.

== Problems in source documents ==
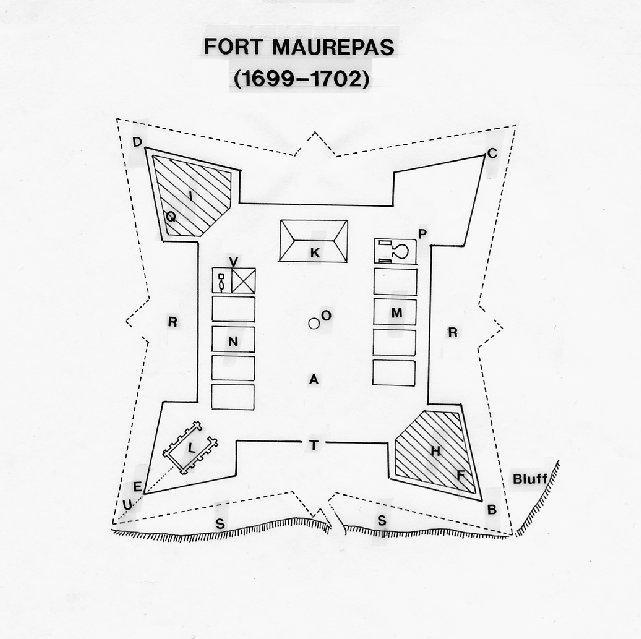
Blueprint of Fort Maurepas

Historical documents, reports and translated journals about Fort Maurepas sometimes contain conflicting dates and details. The records of what people knew and their understanding of time and context were limited. Often, such writings compress events to simplify the overall view. In summary, the French claim to La Louisiane (in New France) began at Fort Maurepas in 1699, moved to Mobile in 1702 (relocated in 1711), and returned to Fort Maurepas (Old Biloxi) in 1719. The main garrison moved to the fort at (New) Biloxi, then to New Orleans during June–August 1722. Several source documents sometimes state "1723" for the founding of New Orleans as the capital, but this was in fact its first full-year as capital.

The name Alabama (after a Native American tribe) was used by the French colonists as one of the nine military districts of the Province of Louisiana (in 1752): Biloxi, Natchez, Yazoo, Alabama, Mobile, New Orleans, Illinois, Arkansas and Natchitoches (French names of military districts; all but two were named after local Native American tribes).

== See also ==
- Mobile, Alabama - founded in 1702 by Pierre Le Moyne d'Iberville
- New Orleans, Louisiana - founded in 1718 by Jean-Baptiste Le Moyne de Bienville for Iberville
